= Lorenzo Taezaz =

Eritrean-born Ethiopian diplomat and politician (1900–1947)

Blatengeta Lorenzo Mebrahtu Taezaz
- ሎረንዞ መብራህቱ ታዕዛዝ
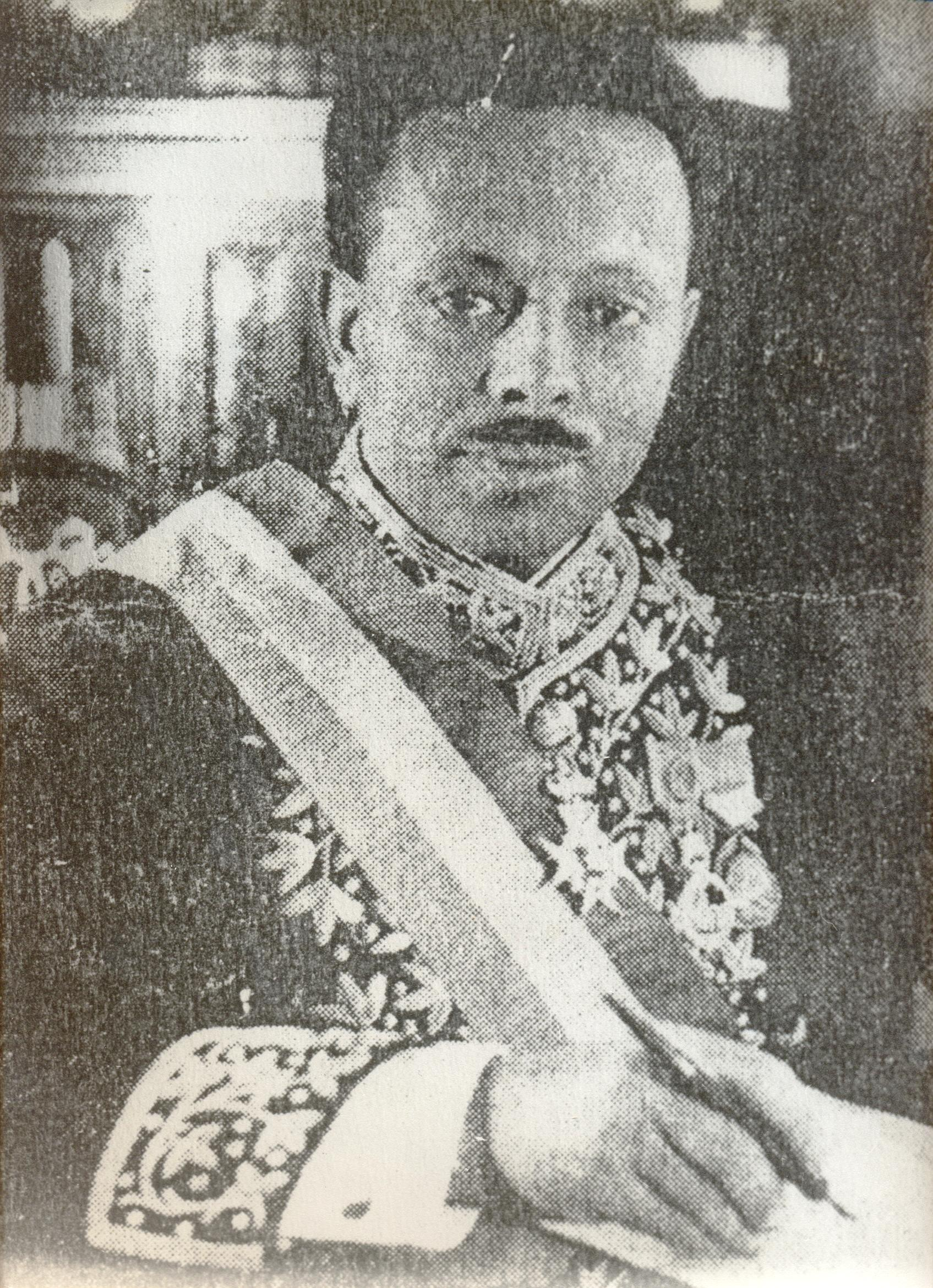
- Lorenzo Taezaz

Minister of Foreign Affairs of Ethiopia
- In office 1941–1942
- Monarch: Haile Selassie
- Preceded by: Heruy Wolde Selassie
- Succeeded by: Ephrem Teweldemedhin

President of the Senate of Ethiopia
- In office 1943–1944
- Monarch: Haile Selassie
- Preceded by: Negash Bezabeh
- Succeeded by: Wolde Meskel

Minister of Posts, Telephones and Telegraphs
- In office 1943–1943
- Monarch: Haile Selassie

Ethiopian Ambassador to the Soviet Union
- In office November 1944 – 1947
- Monarch: Haile Selassie

Permanent Delegate of Ethiopia to the League of Nations
- In office 1936–1941
- Monarch: Haile Selassie

Personal details
- Born: Mebrahtu Taezazi; 30 June 1900 Adi Keyh, Akele Guzai, Italian Eritrea
- Died: 23 June 1947 (aged 46) Stockholm, Sweden
- Spouses: Senedu Gebru (m. 1934; separated); Yemiserach Imru (m. 1943)
- Education: University of Montpellier
- Occupation: Diplomat, politician, courtier

Lorenzo Mebrahtu Taezaz (Tigrinya: ሎረንዞ መብራህቱ ታዕዛዝ, romanized: Loränzo Mäbrahtu Taʿəzaz; Amharic: ሎሬንዞ መብራህቱ ታዕዛዝ, romanized: Lorenzo Mäbrahtu Taʿəzaz; 30 June 1900 – 23 June 1947), was an Eritrean-Ethiopian diplomat, politician and courtier, and considered one of the most important figures of the Ethiopian resistance, the Arbegnoch, against Italian colonialism. He served as Emperor Haile Selassie's diplomatic representative during the Emperor's exile in Britain following the Second Italo-Ethiopian War, being the permanent delegate from Ethiopia to the League of Nations. After the restoration of the Ethiopian government, Lorenzo Taezaz was Minister of Foreign Affairs, Minister of Post and Telegraph, and served in the Ethiopian Senate.

== Biography ==
Lorenzo Taezaz was born in the Akele Guzay province of Eritrea, then an Italian colony, and his original name was Mebrahtu Taezazi. One source believes he received his earliest education in Italian schools in Asmara and Keren, although the Ethiopian historian Bahru Zewde believes he studied at the Swedish mission school in Asmara. Following a chance meeting with Ras Taferi Makonnen (the later Emperor Haile Selassie), he received a scholarship to study in France, where he spent eight years and received a doctorate in Law at the University of Montpellier. He then joined the Italian colonial service in Eritrea, and rose to the rank of secretary to the Governor of Eritrea (1925), but finally fled to Aden and then settled in Ethiopia (1926), where he later joined the Ethiopian Ministry of Justice (1933).

In March 1934, he replaced Lij Zaude Balaine, Assistant Ethiopian Commissioner, who had to be evacuated to Addis Ababa with acute appendicitis, and became the next member of the Anglo-Ethiopian Boundary Commission, which demarcated Ethiopia's borders with former British Somaliland, and the same year be chosen to undertake the role of Consul-General of Ethiopia to Eritrea after Lij Seifu Mikael was recalled to take over Hakim Workneh Eshete's position as governor of the lucrative Chercher province upon Workneh Eshete's departure to London representing Ethiopia. He was later charged to investigate the causes of the Walwal Incident (1935), occurred in December 1934 when Italian colonial forces and Abyssinian soldiers clashed at the Walwal oasis.

In March 1936, Taezaz is said to have seen action on the northern front at the Battle of Maychew, in the south of the region of Tigray, the last major battle fought on this front line against the defensive army of Italian Marshal Pietro Badoglio, followed eleven months later by the end of the war (October 1935–February 1937) finally lost by the defeated Ethiopian forces. He literally followed Emperor Haile Selassie's departure from Ethiopia to Britain, riding on the last train to Djibouti, along with three Swedish officers, most of the ministers and other notables of the Imperial court.

After the Emperor's speech (on 12 May 1936) addressed to the League of Nations at Geneva, denouncing the Italian occupation, and after being appointed Permanent Delegate to that body – by the Government-in-exile of the Ethiopian Empire – as well as Confidential & Political Secretary to the Emperor (1936-1941), Blata Lorenzo Taezaz entered occupied Ethiopia on clandestine intelligence missions several times: In November 1940, especially when he accompanied three elders who were returning to Armachiho (Lay Armachiho or else Tach Armachiho) in northern Ethiopia, after waiting in Khartoum for help from the British; he also smuggled weapons for the Arbegnoch and travelled to Kenya, where he aided in recruiting and organizing to fight into Ethiopian resistance 2,000 Eritreans soldiers, who had been interned in Kenyan settlements for years, having fled there not long after the Italian conquest in 1937.

On 5 May 1941, Haile Selassie entered Addis Ababa, after Italy was defeated by combined forces of the United Kingdom, the Commonwealth of Nations, Free France, Free Belgium, and Ethiopian partisans. At the restoration of the Emperor and his Government, Taezaz was appointed Minister of Foreign Affairs (1941–1943) with the title of Blatengeta, but was subsequently downgraded to the position of Minister for Posts, Telephones and Telegraphs (1943).

According to Bahru Zewde, Taezaz came into conflict with the powerful Tsehafi Taezaz ("Minister of the Pen") Wolde Giyorgis Wolde Yohannes, who had him appointed to the ceremonial Presidency of the Senate (1943–1944), then as Ambassador to the Soviet Union (November 1944) – effectively exiled from the center of power. He was sent as a delegate to the Paris Peace Conference (May 1946), and then was appointed Ambassador to Sweden. After being in Sweden for only a month, Lorenzo Taezaz died – at almost 47 years old – in suspicious circumstances in a Stockholm hospital, in June 1947.

== Personal life ==
Lorenzo Taezaz was first married, in 1934, to Woizero Senedu Gebru, sister of Ethiopian composer and Ethiopian Orthodox Church nun Emahoy Tsegué-Maryam Guèbrou, the daughters of noted Ethiopian intellectual Käntiba Gebru Desta of Gondar who was one of the few foreign-educated Ethiopians (in Switzerland) during the reign of Menelik II. Woizero Senedu would go on to become the first woman to serve in the Imperial Parliament and would rise to the rank of Vice President of the Upper House of Parliament, the Chamber of The Senate (Yeheggue Mewossegna Meker Beth). Separated from his first wife during the Italian occupation, he was subsequently married, in 1943, – without issue – to Immabet-Hoy Yemiserach Imru (born ca. 1915), widow of Vice President of the Ethiopian Red Cross Society Blatengeta George Fekade-Selassie Herui (killed by the Italians on 19 February 1937) and eldest daughter of Leul Ras Imru Haile Selassie, a cousin of the Emperor and one of the leading progressive and reformist figures of the Ethiopian aristocracy, who was said to have loved Taezaz like his own son. He thus entered the extended Imperial family, reaching the highest levels of the Imperial court and the top social stratum of the Ethiopian hierarchy.

== Honours ==
Lorenzo Taezaz had received, among others, the honours and decorations of Grand Cross of the Order of the Star of Ethiopia, Officer of the Order of the Holy Trinity, St George Medal of War with two palms (1941), Commander of the Royal Order of the Polar Star of Sweden, etc.
