= List of Amharic writers =

The following is an alphabetical list of Amharic writers, presenting an overview of notable authors, journalists, novelists, playwrights, poets and screenwriters who have released literary works in the Amharic language, used predominantly in Ethiopia.

== List ==
A
- Abe Gubegna
- Abu Rumi
- Afäwarq Gäbrä Iyäsus
- Amsalu Aklilu
- Araya Getahun Tekleabib
- Asfa-Wossen Asserate
- Ashenafi Kebede
- Assefa Gebre-Mariam Tessema

=== B ===
- Bahru Zewde
- Bewketu Seyoum
- Berhanu Zerihun
- Billene Seyoum Woldeyes
- Bruktawit Tigabu Tadesse

=== D ===
- Daniachew Worku

=== E ===
- Elias Kifle

=== G ===
- Getatchew Haile
- Gibreab Teferi

=== H ===
- Haddis Alemayehu
- Haile Selassie
- Heruy Wolde Selassie

=== K ===
- Kebede Michael

=== M ===
- Mammo Wudneh
- Makonnen Endelkachew
- Mengistu Lemma

=== N ===
- Nebiy Mekonnen

=== S ===
- Sahle Sellassie Berhane Mariam
- Senedu Gebru

=== T ===
- Taddasa Liban
- Taddesse Tamrat
- Tekle Hawariat Tekle Mariyam
- Teshome Gabriel
- Tsegaye Gabre-Medhin
- Tsehay Melaku

=== Y ===
- Yemodish Bekele
- Yona Bogale

== See also ==
- List of Ethiopian writers
