= Seifu Mikael =

Ethiopian noble (1898–1958)

Seifu Mikael ሠይፉ ሚካኤል
- Lij
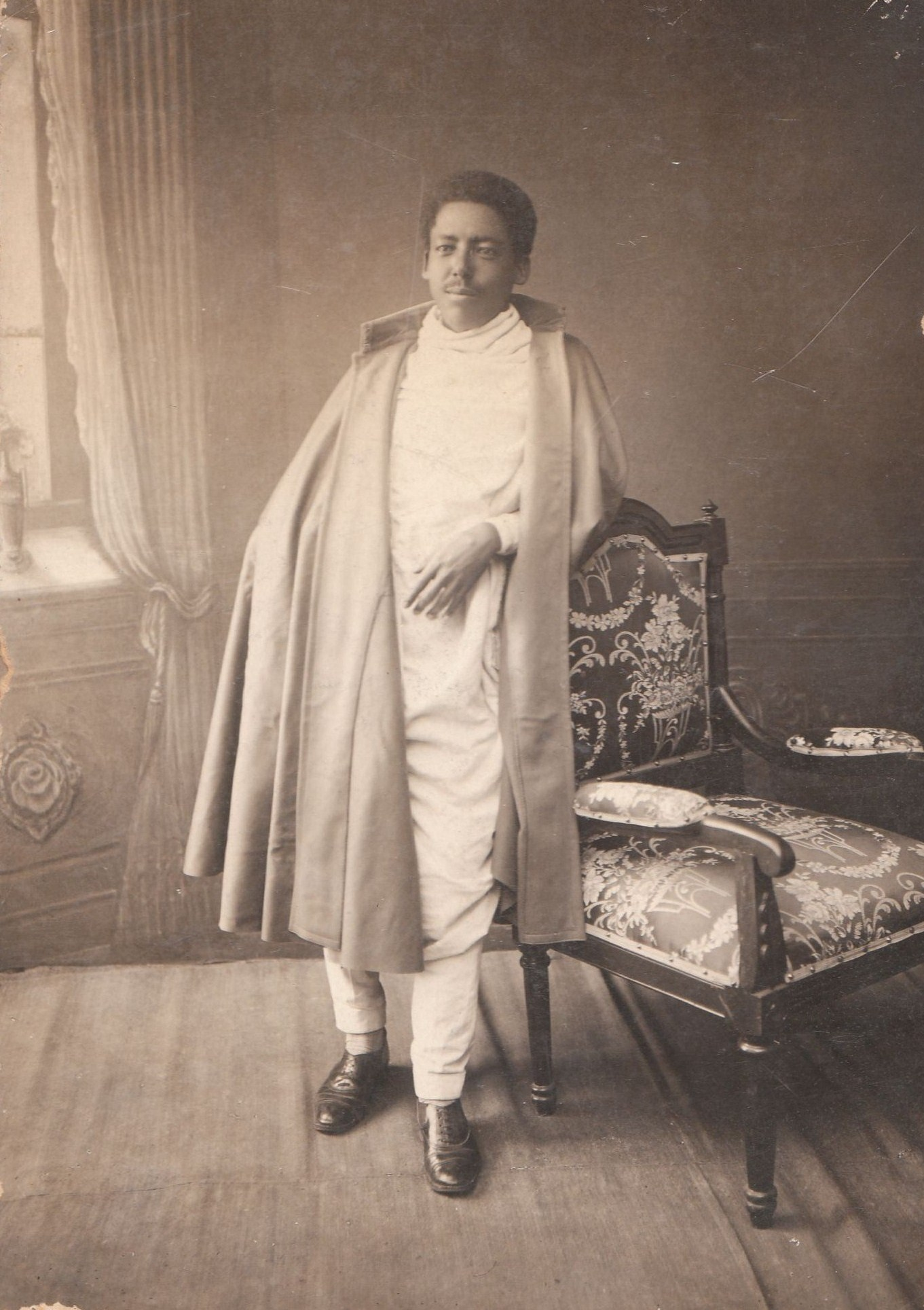
- Born: 14 January 1898; Ankober, Shewa Province, Ethiopian Empire
- Died: 23 September 1958 (aged 60); Addis Ababa, Ethiopia
- Spouses: Woizero Zewde Haile Lady Sara C. Martin Woizero Aster Hailu
- Issue: Lij Kifle Seifu; Lij Eskinder Seifu; Ato Sirak Seifu; Ato Hailu Seifu ——: Lij Daniel Kifle Seifu, (grandson); Lij Elias Kifle Seifu (grandson); Lij Brook Kifle Seifu, CSE, AJP (grandson); Lady Elizabeth Kifle Seifu (granddaughter)
- Dynasty: House of Solomon (Shewan Branch)
- Father: Ato Mikael Birru
- Mother: Lady Shewaferash Mekuria
- Religion: Ethiopian Orthodox Church
- Education: Paris-Sorbonne University(L.L.B)
- Occupations: Ethiopian Minister Plenipotentiary to France & Germany; Consul General of Ethiopia to Eritrea; Inspector General of the Ministry of Justice, Advisor to the palace Governor of Chercher; Administrator of the Ethiopian Orthodox Church, Patriot, Businessman
- Relatives: Ato Kebede Michael (nephew); Lij Amdewerk Mikael (brother); Woizero Atsede Mikael (sister); Woizero Ayelech Gizaw (sister)
- Military career
- Conflicts: Second Italo-Ethiopian War World War II

Lij Seifu Mikael (Amharic: ልጅ ሠይፉ ሚካኤል, Säyfu Mikāēl, also Sayfu Mikael, Seifu Michael; 14 January 1898 – 23 September 1958) was an Ethiopian royal, member of the Solomonic dynasty from the House of Solomon that descended from the ancient Kingdom of Aksum, belonging to the branch of the aristocratic Amhara family from Ankober Shewa. He was the great-grandson of King Sahle Selassie of Shewa and his wife Queen Bezabish Dejene of Gojjam through his grandfather, Dejazmatch Mekuria Tesfaye of Gerim Gabriel, a first cousin of Emperor Menelik II of Ethiopia.

Emperor Menelik II and Emperor Haile Selassie, along with Lij Seifu Mikael were among the direct descendents of King Sahle Selassie.

Dejazmach Mekuria was once married to Woizero Man'alebish, Emperor Menelik's stepdaughter from his second wife Woizero Bafena. After their marriage was dissolved, she was sent to Wollo Province to marry King Mikael of Wollo.

Lij Seifu, a public figure, was educated in Paris at the Sorbonne. He was one of the earliest members of the Ethiopian royalty who started paying salaries to the serving members of their households advocating education, meaningful wages, and freedom of slaves making him an avid supporter of his cousin Ras Tafari, later Emperor Haile Selassie in his bid to become an emperor of Ethiopia who also held the same progressive Judeo-Christian values. He sponsored several Ethiopians for higher education including four artists whom he sent to France after discovering their skills at the Debre Bizen Monastery during his appointment as Consul General to Eritrea.

His public service includes Ethiopia's minister to France and Germany, represented Empress Zewditu as a special envoy to the UK, member of delegations to several European countries accompanying imperial officials and the Crown Prince and later the Emperor of Ethiopia, Ethiopia's Consul General to Eritrea and Governor of several districts until the eve of the fascist invasion of Ethiopia, Inspector General of the Ministry of Justice, advisor to the palace on establishing the several municipalities and reorganization of the Ministry of Foreign Affairs, administrator of coffee farms owned by the government in Arsi Zone and Hararghe, and Administrator of the Ethiopian Orthodox Tewahedo Church, credited for overseeing the establishment of the Church's real estate interests to bolster the Church's income and modernize the secular administration of the Church. As one of the wealthiest Ethiopians of the time, some of the real estate establishments of the Church were personally financed by him as a gift to the Church. He believed the church needed to have a Vatican like administrative structure to help the Church attain modern, separate and significant financial position in addition to the Church's centuries of undisputed influence in the imperial government system.

During Ethiopia's preparations for the Second Italo-Ethiopian War (1935–1936), Lij Seifu, a prominent arms dealer, played a critical role in supplying the Ethiopian Empire with weapons. His company provided the majority of rifles and ammunition acquired by the imperial government and the private armies of Ethiopian nobility, often without immediate payment, to bolster the defense of national sovereignty against Mussolini's invasion. Notably, Lij Seifu supplied approximately 400,000 Maria Theresa thalers’ worth of arms to Ras Hailu Teklehaimanot, the governor and prince of Gojam, enabling the arming of Gojam's provincial troops under the prince’s command. In 2025, the value of these thalers, unadjusted for inflation, is estimated to range between $10 million and $20 million.

During the Second Italo-Ethiopian War, he led an army at the Aussa desert front in the Afar Region and was captured after his army was annihilated by Italian bombers, shortage of ammunition, water, and food. He became one of the Ethiopian POWs during the Second Italo-Ethiopian War at Asinara designated as "one of the most dangerous Ethiopians" per surviving Italian colonial documents that have his name on top of the list of distinguished Ethiopians imprisoned by the fascists. He was imprisoned at the Island for four years.

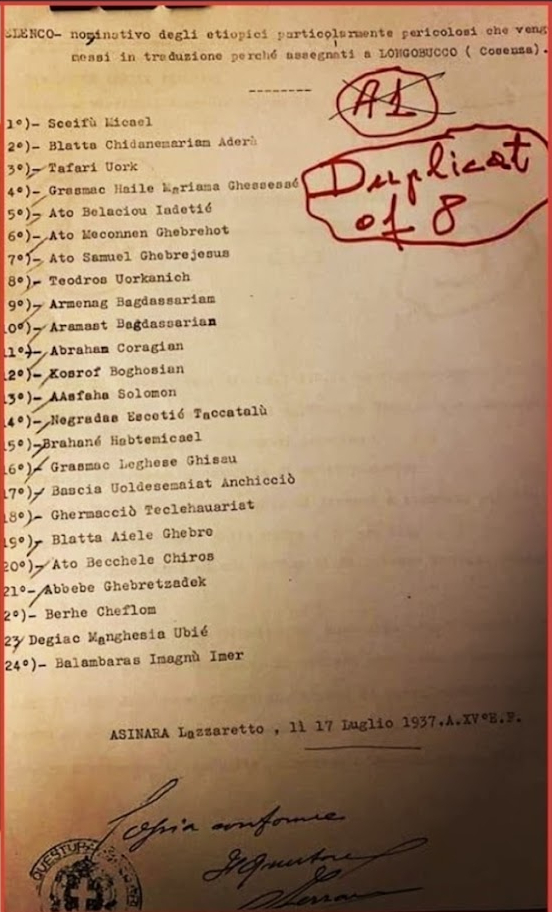
Lij Seifu Listed as one of the most dangerous Ethiopians" per surviving Italian colonial documents.

Pursuant to his written accounts, in the beginning, he liked, admired, and supported his relative Emperor Haile Selassie, during his regency for his zeal and progressive policies but later grew to despise his rule after Ras Tafari became emperor, citing partisanship, disdain towards certain descendants of King Sahle Sellasie, the old officials of Menelik II and Empress Zewditu, contempt to criticisms and perceived isolation of early educated Ethiopians whom he wasn't responsible for their education; as a result, Seifu as one of the earliest educated Ethiopians who didn't owe their education to Ras Tafari, he believed the roles he played in shaping modern Ethiopian institutions, especially the foreign affairs bureau he helped organize as well as his diplomatic contributions and struggles before and during the Italo-Ethiopian war have been undermined.

Seifu expressed these opinions through his surviving poems he wrote during his imprisonment by the fascists at Asinara Island and later in his life as administrator of the Ethiopian Orthodox Tewahedo Church. In one of his diaries, he expressed his grief over the knowledge of how Lij Iyasu was treated during his years of captivation and his subsequent elimination after Emperor Haile Selassie's decision to leave the country for exile in Europe. He blamed some of the Emperor's backward advisers with the exception of Luel Ras Kassa Haile Darge whom, he wrote, was too reverential to decide on the life of Lij Iyasu.

== Biography ==
Born Seife Sillasie Mikael in Ankobar, Northern Shewa, was active mainly during Empress Zewditu's reign and the earliest times of Emperor Haile Selassie.

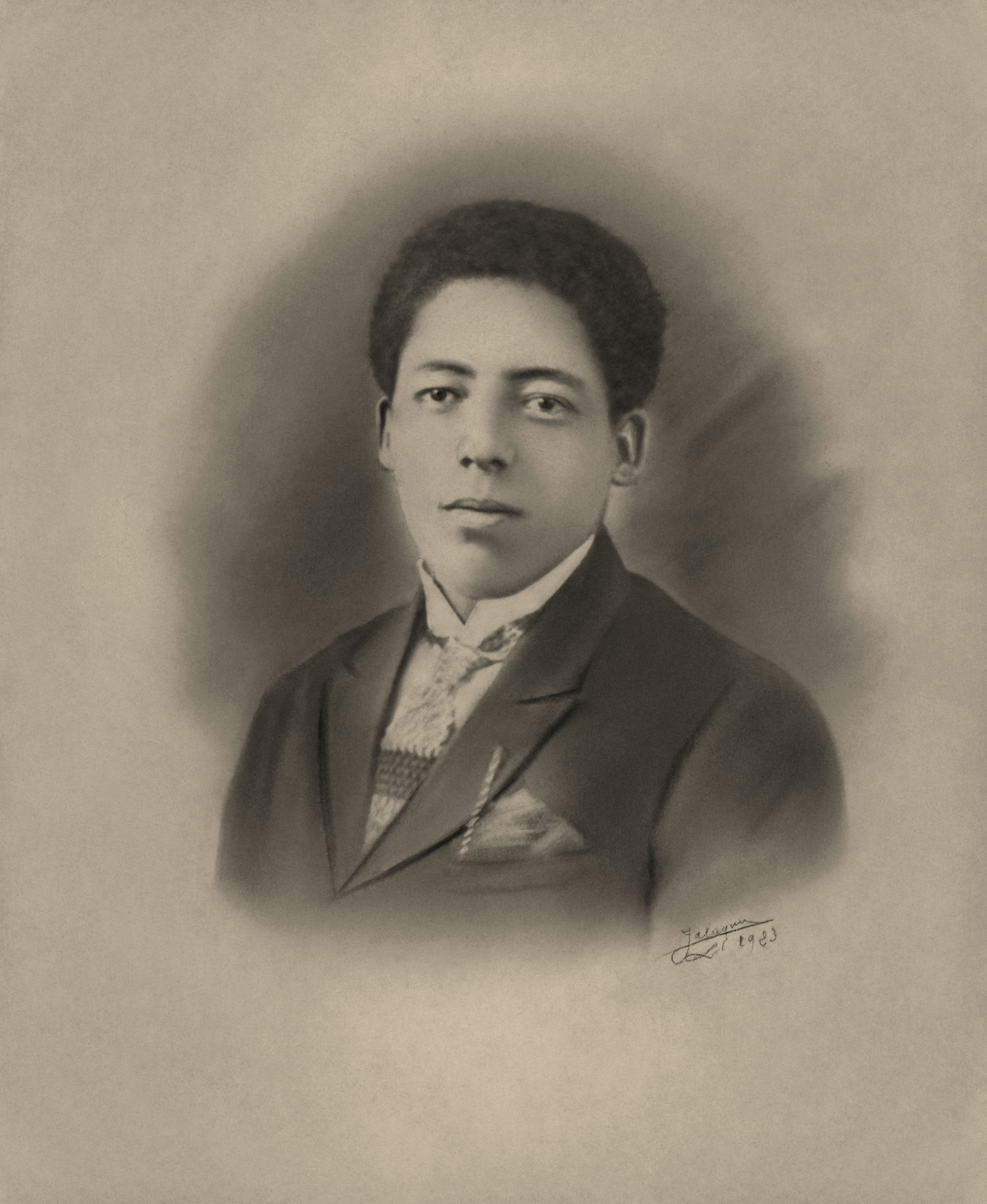
Lij Seifu Mikael, Ethiopia's Minister to France and Germany

His father Ato Mikael, a prominent figure in Emperor Menelik II's court, studied in Germany and was the first Ethiopian to publish a modern Amharic mathematics book for Ethiopian students as well as a medical treatise. Seifu's mother, Ato Mikael's second wife was Lady Shewaferash Mekuria who was the daughter of Dejazmatch Mekuria Tesfaye, Emperor Menelik II's first cousin and his general who was the head of 10,000 elite forces armed with the most modern weapons of the time. The Dejazmach marched with Emperor Menelik II during the monarch's successful efforts in bringing the southern Ethiopian regions under the central imperial government. Before his ascension to power, he was one of Emperor Tewodros II's Shewan prisoners at Magdala with the young Menelik, then a Shewan prince.

Ato Mikael later died of the Spanish flu or "Hidar Beshita" as it was known in Ethiopia, a pandemic that claimed many lives in the months of October and November. Lij Seifu was in London when his father died. He was laid to rest at Debre Berhan Sillasie Church alongside his father-in-law Dejazmatch Mekuria. Ato Mikael's family hails from Ato Giorgis, an Amhara from Gondar, who traveled to Europe in the 16th century for academic reasons. That tradition of extensive travels either for academic or trade endeavors has continued to this day. The Giorgis family eventually married into the Ankober aristocracy which it finally and completely integrated into when Ato Mikael Birru married Lady Shewaferash, Emperor Menelik's niece.

W/o Shewaferash later married Ras Mesfin Sileshi's uncle Grazmatch Gizaw who was half brother of Ras Mesfin's mother and gave birth to W/o Ayelech Gizaw, Seifu's half sister. Ras Mesfin Sileshi was one of the most powerful men in the country and an accomplished patriot. He met his end during the infamous Massacre of the Sixty.

Seifu completed the traditional Ethiopian religious education both in Addis Ababa and Menz at the Gerim Gabriel Church located on his grandfather's estate followed by a few years at his father's trading post in Aden, Yemen where he attended modern school. He left for France after Lij Iyasu assumed imperial power and gave him permission to continue his education abroad at the Sorbonne University in Paris.

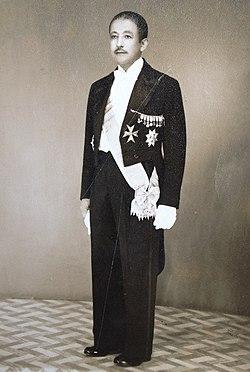
Kebede Mikael

According to his renowned nephew Kebede Michael, besides the assistance of his wealthy father, he used his personal funds to pay for his education after inheriting a large amount of money from his grandfather Dejazmatch Mekuria Tesfaye who made him the sole heir to his estate. As a young student in Europe, he assisted Ethiopian diplomats and senior officials as an interpreter, thus having exposure to European heads of states early on. During that time, he cultivated lasting friendships with his father's friends, the foreign minister BlattenGeta Heruy Wolde Selassie, Mayor Mersha Nahusenay, Fitawrari Tekle Hawariat Tekle Mariyam and later in Ethiopia with Hakim Workneh Eshete also known as Dr. Charles Martin who was a good friend to his father Ato Mikael whom the doctor regarded as a close friend and a go-to person to have an immediate access to Emperor Menelik with whom Hakim Workneh later enjoyed daily visits to treat the aging and ailing monarch. Ato Mikael was instrumental in arranging Hakim Workneh's marriage to W/O Qatsala Tullu. Seifu would later marry Hakim Workneh's daughter W/O Sarah Martin.

== Professional life ==
Upon his return from Europe and his father's death, Seifu as a young man traveled with Blattengeta Heruy Wolde Selassie and other senior members of the imperial government to Europe assisting them with his foreign languages proficiency and foreign affairs advice. He spoke fluent English, French, German, Italian, Hebrew, and Arabic as well as Ethiopian ethnic languages Amharic, Oromomigna and Tigrigna.

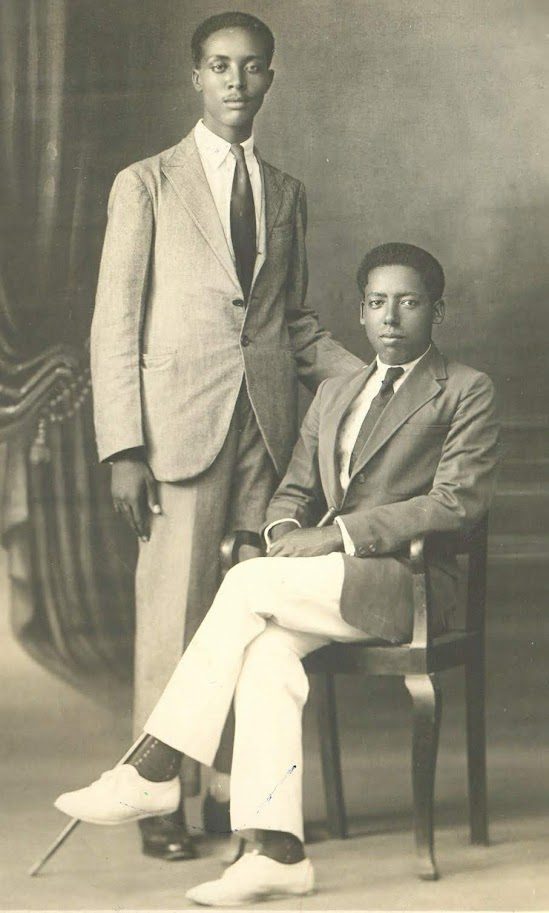
Lij Seifu Mikael with his personal assistant and secretary.

In June 1919, he was among the special commissioners sent to Europe by Empress Zewditu who presented a letter of congratulations to the King and Queen of the United Kingdom for the success of the allied arms.

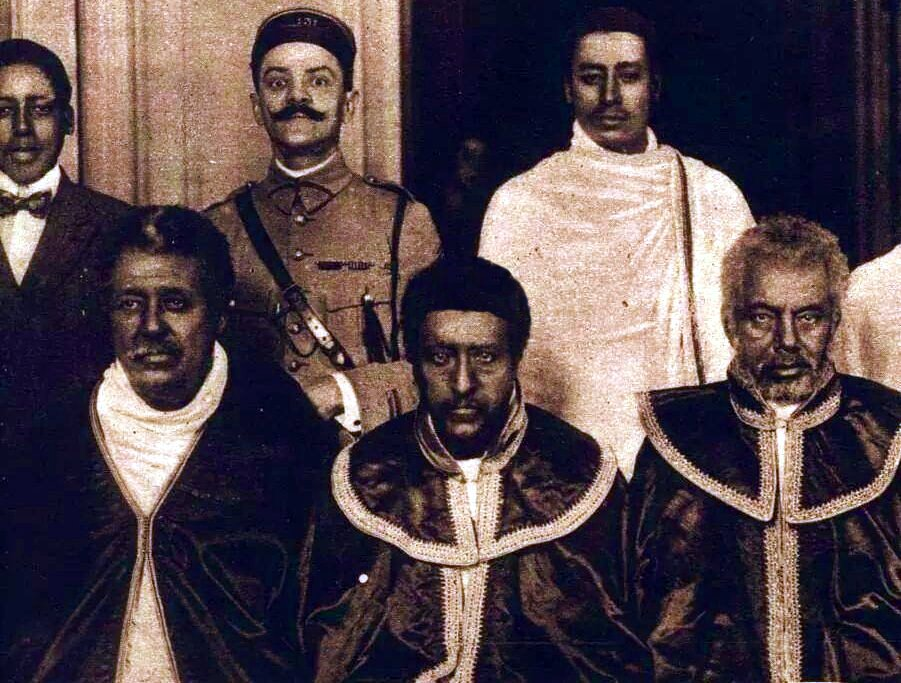
Special Commissioners from Empress Zauditu of Ethiopia sent to London. Lij Seifu Mikael (standing far left)

He served as Ethiopia's Minister Plenipotentiary to France and Germany at different times between 1920 and 1927.

He served as Ethiopia's Consul General to Eritrea appointed by Empress Zewditu in 1923 and lived in Asmara till the end of 1926.

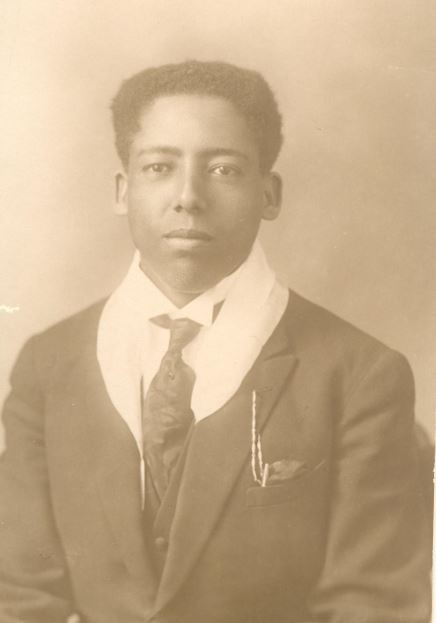
Lij Seifu Mikael, Consul General of Ethiopia to Eritrea

Generally regarded as a man close to Lij Eyasu, the future Emperor Haile Selassie held him with some uneasiness, later recalled him from Eritrea and made him governor of the lucrative Chercher, Baka, and Miesso region in 1927 during which time he started a modern coffee farm at Mangudetu in the Baka district. Known for his hot tempered impatience for tardiness and poor performance at work by public servants in the rather uncivilized province compared to Asmara where he served as Consul General, he came to be known as "Seifu Gomoraw" that means Seifu the Volcano. In the mid-1930s, Hakim Workneh got Seifu's old job as governor of Chercher and Seifu was appointed as deputy governor upon the departure of Hakim Workneh leaving for England.

In the early 1930s, he traveled to Europe with Blattengeta Heruy to help Ethiopia secure permission to buy arms and strengthen Ethiopian position in the League of Nations. He won support from Germany that supplied essential weaponry to Ethiopia in the amount of about six million Reichsmark. Seifu used his expertise as supplier of arms to the Ethiopian Empire to bypass colonial powers encircling Ethiopia to deliver the weapons and ammunition. While serving as a public servant, he also led a very successful arms supply business partnering with another French educated Ethiopian, Ato Gebre Ebziabher. According to the surviving documents, they bought, imported and sold weapons and ammunition worth millions of Maria Theresa Thalers, a favored currency of that time in the Ethiopian Empire. He used the proceeds to acquire expansive commercial real estate and start modern farms in the country.

In 1924, he was part of the delegation who met with the German president Herr. Friedrich Ebert and his successor Herr. Paul von Hindenburg. Ethiopia was represented by Dejazmatch Haile Selassie Abayneh, Lij Seifu Mikael and Ato Sahle Tsedalu.

Dejazmach Haile Selassie Abayneh who raised Emperor Haile Selassie with his son Prince Imru Haile Selassie was one of the senior nobles with whom Seifu enjoyed close affinity and traveled with him to European countries. Dejazmach Abayneh had a huge and positive influence on the Emperor during his regency. Many members of the monarchy and ministers used his influence to advance their opinions and ambitions.

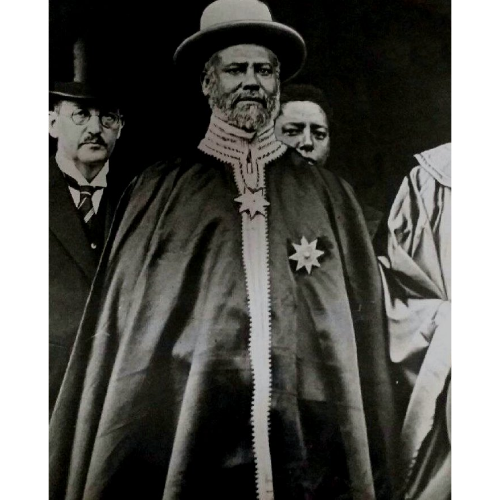
Dejazmach Haile Selassie Abayneh, father of Leul Ras Imru and uncle of Emperor Haile Selassie with Lij Seifu Mikael in Germany

After the fascist Italian invasion during the Second Italo-Ethiopian War, Seifu accompanied the Emperor to Djibouti along with Ato Mekonnen Habtewold, Fitawrari Tekle Hawariat Tekle Mariyam and other notables according to Fitawrari TekleHawariat's autobiography. Before leaving Addis Ababa, Seifu became one of the nobles along with Leul Ras Kassa standing against those who decided the alleged elimination of Lij Eyasu convincing the Emperor not leave an heir to the Solomonic throne exposed, fearing doing so could mean the Italians can capture and use to legitimize their control of the country and effectively colonize the country. He later returned to Ethiopia from Djibouti after a fallout with the emperor due to an overheard conversation with Fitawrari TekleHawariat criticizing Haile Selassie over the death of Lij Eyasu. He joined the resistance leading a contingent of patriots at Awsa front which was the offshoot of the early struggle of the Black Lions created by educated Ethiopians and disbanded members of the army led by Leul Ras(Prince) Imru.

The Awsa front was in close proximity to Djibouti and joined by few returnees who decided patriotism over exile. He was captured early in the struggle by the Italians after his unit at Awsa was destroyed. After a brief incarceration in Addis Ababa, he was transferred to the Asinara island prison in Italy. His wife Sara Martin, her mother and her siblings were also among the 400 Ethiopian POWs during the Second Italo-Ethiopian War at Asinara He was repatriated back to Ethiopia with his wife by the end of 1939 after relentless requests by his nephew Kebede Michael who was employed by the Italians when they entered the capital. He was fluent in Italian, French and English. It was common with prominent collaborators and employees to request the release of their relatives; Ras Seyoum Mengesha was one of the most prominent Ethiopians who submitted to the enemy but yet played a role in securing the release of many of his relatives and several Ethiopians. Upon his return, Seifu was suspected by the Italians for getting and passing crucial tactical information from his nephew Kebede Michael and Dejazmatch Mellise Sahle who was also a collaborator and father-in-law of Kebede Michael, to the patriots in Gojjam and Northern Shewa.

Belay Zeleke and other patriots used the information secretly sent to them by the nobles who had ways of getting and transmitting information. Due to lack of evidence, the Italians overlooked the allegations against Kebede Michael and the fascist appointed Dejazmatch but put Seifu under house arrest at his estate till the liberation. The renowned and the formidable patriot Ras Abebe Aregai intervened on behalf of Kebede Michael, revealing to the emperor that it was underground collaborative work conducted by learned Ethiopians like Kebede Michael who made it possible for the patriots to attack the right targets and evade capture when pursued by the fascists. Kebede Michael would later rise to high government offices and became one of the closest confidants of the Emperor despite his uncle's conflict with the monarch.

After the liberation, Emperor Haile Selassie, disappointed by Seifu's opposition over the highly secret decision to eliminate Lij Iyasu before leaving for exile and the remarks he made to him in Djibouti, ordered him to stay under house arrest for a year while pardoning the known collaborators. Seifu as a result became an increasingly outspoken critic of Haile Selassie and went as far as aiding the patriot from Gojjam, Belay Zeleke with whom he had contact during the resistance, to escape from prison and furnishing him with funds to stay underground to avoid his inevitable elimination. Seifu was responsible for arming Gojjam before the fascist invasion and supported the patriots during the resistance. After the capture of Belay Zeleke, Seifu was implicated and ordered to remain under house arrest indefinitely while Belay Zeleke, his brother and other fellow patriots, friends and relatives who rebelled against the emperor were hanged. As a result of his defiance, the expansive estates he lost to Leul Ras Hailu Tekle Haymanot during the occupation was denied to him under the provisions that the prince's wealth has been confiscated and transferred to the Ministry of Treasury and part of the prime Addis Ababa property he lost to the Italians which was developed into the iconic Ras Hotel, effectively became the property of the government. His last appointment was as an administrator of the Ethiopian Orthodox Church, only to get caught up in another feud with the emperor for the comments he made during a dinner party in the presence of people close to Emperor Haile Selassie about the coup d'état attempt of the 1950s by a group of young German-educated Ethiopians to limit the power of the monarch through a constitutional monarchy. According to H.E. Ambassador Ahadu Sabure, Seifu initially disagreed about the coup attempt but said if it was him who tried, he could have made a successful coup by pointing out the steps that should have been taken. The emperor was told about the conversation and called the prominent businessman Ato Bekele Shebah who was present during the conversation. Bekele told the emperor that Seifu didn't suggest another coup or was he involved in any but simply commented on the situation. Seifu would later be called to the palace to explain his comments which he didn't deny making them but told the emperor his rule is responsible for any grievances resulting in such attempts. Offended, the emperor banished him to his Ambo country house and farm where he died from complications of diabetes and high blood pressure in Addis Ababa shortly after.

His funeral was attended by his lifelong friend The Crown Prince Asfaw Wossen Amha Selassie, Princess Tenagnework and several members of the Imperial family, military leaders and the nobility. The mass was conducted by His Holiness Abuna Basilios, Patriarch of the Ethiopian Orthodox Church. He was laid to rest at the Emmanuel Ethiopian Orthodox Church which he served as its main benefactor.

== Personal life ==
In 1927 he married W/o Zewde Haile, the grand daughter of Aba WoldeHana Gebre, a respected elderly monk whose father was one of Menelik's chiefs by the time he brought the Harar province under his rule and a Shewa family of extremely conservative Orthodox Christian roots. Seifu later appointed Aba WoldeHana, the Abbott of the Abune Tekle Haymanot Church he built in Bekka, Hararghe. W/o Zewde gave birth to his first born Lij Kifle Seifu Mikael on the same day the Church was inaugurated on Sep 11, 1928. They separated by the end of 1929. He named his son after his best friend Dejazmatch Kifle Dadi, Governor of Tigray. During his time as governor of Cherecher, his close relationship with the pious Aba WoldeHana influenced his devotion to the Ethiopian Church and commissioned the construction of Orthodox Churches in different parts of the Hararghe province including the TekleHaimanot Church at which his son Lij Kifle Seifu was baptized.

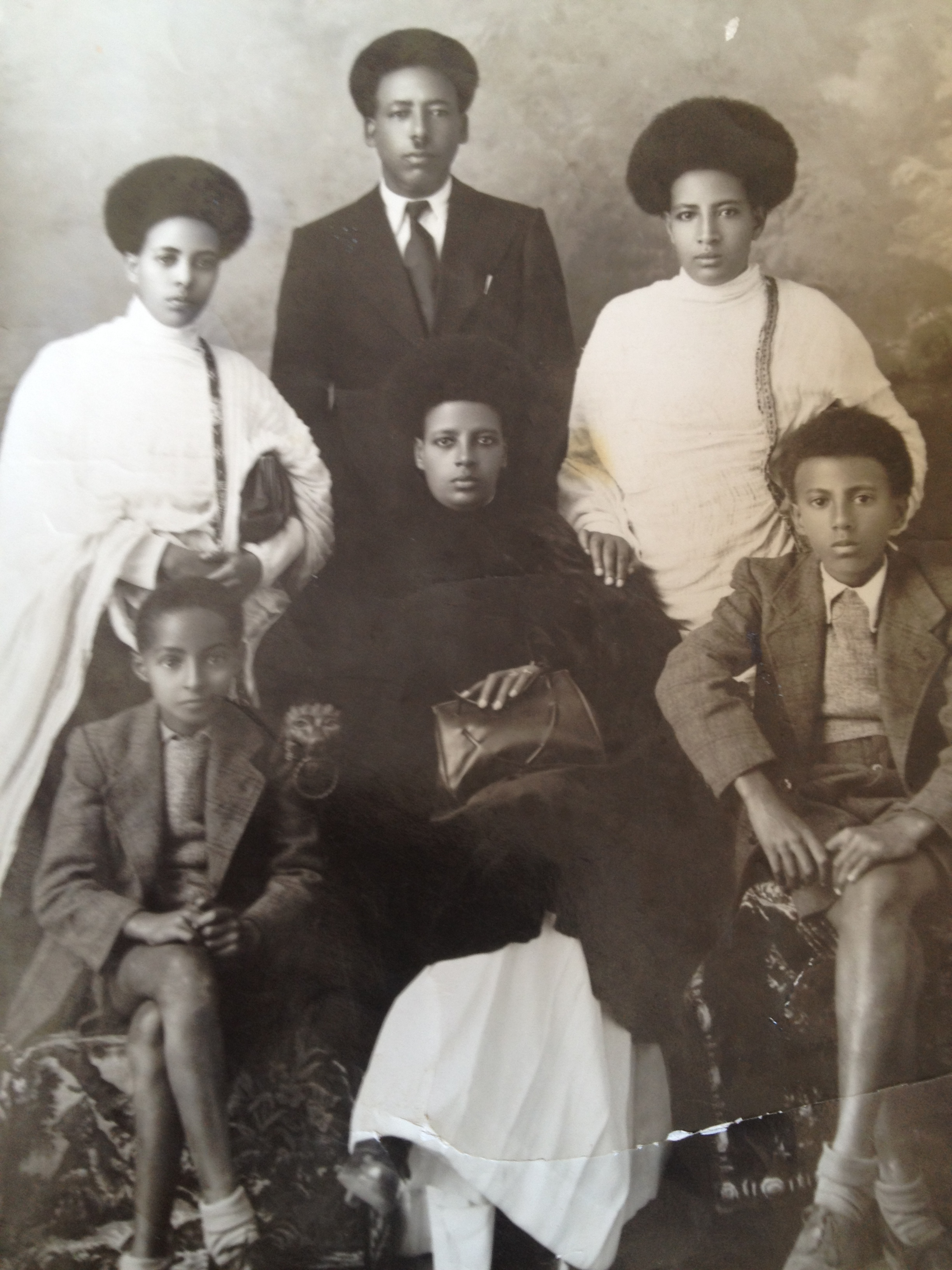
Lij Seifu Mikael and EmebetHoy Man'yahilushal Kassa Haile Darge

He married Hakim Workneh Eshete's daughter Sarah Martin at St George Church in June 1934,

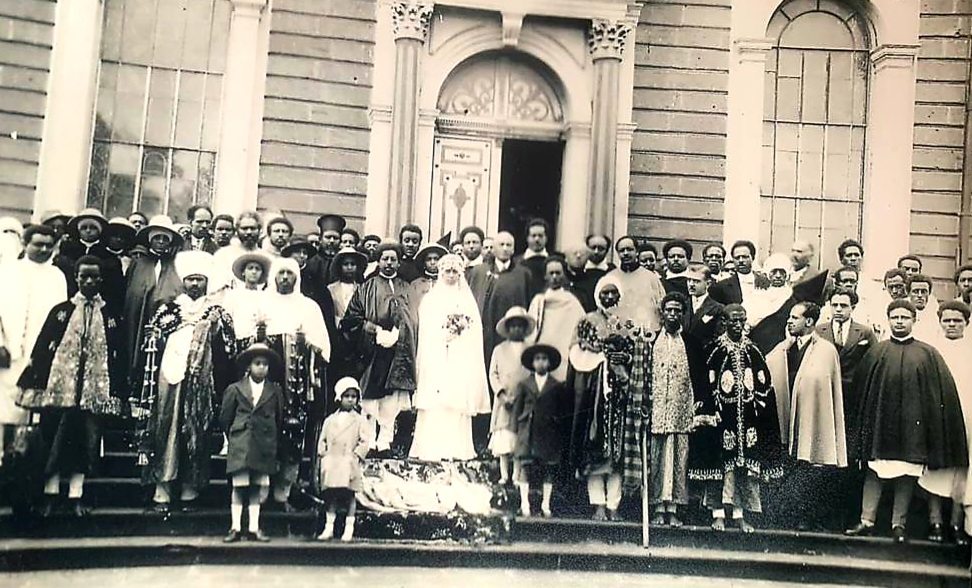
Ethiopian Royal wedding, Lij Seifu Mikael and Woizero Sara Martin

her father was also at one point the governor of Chercher. He was at the Asinara Italian island prison with his wife Sara. They were repatriated to Ethiopia by the end of 1939. The marriage ended around the time Ethiopia gained her independence and she died shortly after. The union didn't produce any children. Seifu's father Mikael Birru whom the doctor considered a close friend was one of the people who arranged the marriage between Hakim Workneh Eshete and W/o Qatsala Tullu.

In 1951, he married Dejazmatch Hailu's daughter W/o Aster Hailu whose father was also an inmate with Seifu and his wife Sara at Asinara Italian prison. From this union, he fathered Sirak Seifu, Hailu Seifu and Eskinder Seifu. Dejazmatch Hailu was an imposing dignitary and a direct descendant of the Tigre branch of the Solomonic dynasty and a close relative of Emperor Yohannes IV.

Lij Seifu Mikael was unpublished writer who wrote philosophical aspects of life, religion and politics. He wrote numerous poems. The famous Ethiopian scholar Kebede Michael was his nephew, the son of his older sister Woizero Atsede Mikael. Seifu brought Kebede from Menz and enrolled him at the Cathedral School and later to Lazarist Mission and Alliance Ethio-Francaise. He later requested the permission of the Emperor to have Kebede teach the young and favorite son of the Emperor, Prince Makonnen Haile Selassie. Most of Kebede's works were influenced by his uncle Seifu's writings.

In the last years of his life, he bought land at Ambo which he developed into a French inspired garden that included a mansion complete with a series of fountains, a swimming pool and the country's turkey farm that supplied turkey for the vibrant expat community during the imperial times. It also became the place where he was banished to during his quarrels with the emperor. During those years, he enjoyed the unwavering friendship of Dejazmatch Girmachew Tekle Hawariat who, till the last day of his life stood by his side. Seifu reminded the Dejazmatch of his own father Fitawrari Tekle Hawariat Tekle Mariyam who was a modernist, an outspoken man who spoke his mind and got in trouble for it. Like Seifu, he was shunned by the Emperor who according to Fitawrari Tekle Hawariat's memoir, hated challenges from educated Ethiopians. Fitawrari Tekle Hawariat, who drafted the very first Ethiopia's modern constitution and represented Ethiopia at the League of Nations under different capacities, had been put either under house arrest or banished to the countryside at different times for reasons that were so trivial such as, for not coming out of a meeting to greet the emperor's wife. According to John Spencer, outspoken critics to the Emperor's rule were demoralized by different stories told against them and suffering the Emperor's signature punishment of "Gizot" which means banishment while the rest where distanced to provincial posts or abroad as diplomats and Ambassadors where they couldn't challenge the emperor.

§ In 1968, Emperor Haile Selassie made notable attempts at reconciliation with Lij Seifu’s eldest son Lij Kifle Seifu.Despite intervention by members of the royal family, Lij Kifle Seifu ultimately declined the emperor’s invitation to the Imperial Palace.

Lij Seifu and Fitawrari Tekle Hawariat were regarded as outspoken critics. The grandchildren of the influential and much respected Dejazmatch Germame of Menelik's era were perceived as independent thinkers and made to serve as ambassadors to different countries and at posts where they didn't enjoy much influence. The second most powerful person in the Ethiopian empire next to the emperor himself, Tsehafe Ta'ezaz Wolde Giyorgis Wolde Yohannes later suffered the same fate, demoted from his post to becoming the governor of Arusi. With Ras Abebe Aregai's and Ras Mesfin Sileshi's exception who succeeded in winning the emperor's trust, most patriots as well as POWs like Seifu were largely out of favor due to a popular belief that they felt more honor and independence comparing their struggle on the ground or their incarceration as war prisoners with the emperor's five years exile in England. According to people who were closest to the monarch, the emperor was very experienced with having people owe their success to him as well as pardoning people who betrayed their country that made them loyal to his rule out of embarrassment. The most senior member of the royalty who was captured after a long patriotic struggle he led under the banner of the "Black Lions" he helped create was Leul Ras Imru Haile Selassie, the Emperor's cousin. He was later a POW at different Italian prison camps. Because he was a childhood friend of the emperor who saw each other as brothers, became another exception by staying close to the emperor with a very considerable influence in the empire. He was considered by many to be a man of integrity and faith, who, despite the emperor's protest, remained to be a close friend to people the emperor has distanced from the government. He was very much liked by Seifu who had always spoken highly of the senior prince, especially for his unique character of avoiding palace intrigues and gossips many nobles and officials used to destroy each other. Leul Ras Imru and his immediate family survived the Derg's despicable crimes against the members of the monarchy.

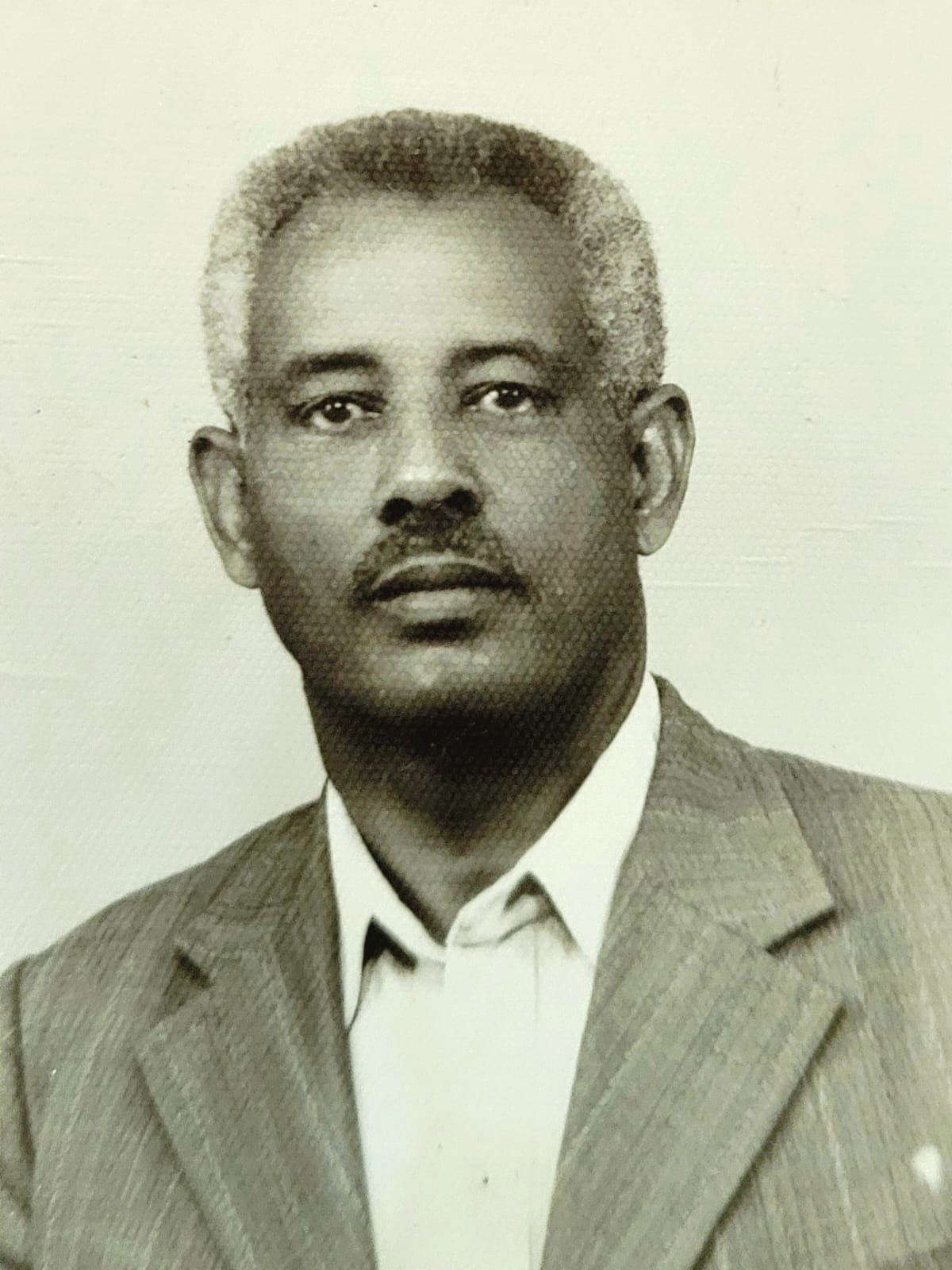
Lij Kifle Seifu

Lij - Kifle Seifu, (11 September 1927 – 7 January 2022) His eldest child and heir to his honors, who succeeded into becoming one of Ethiopia's wealthiest businessmen, owned several modern farms, gold and precious stones mining, construction businesses, sub-contractor for the Assab Oil Refinery and expansion of the Airforce base. He became a victim of the socialist government in 1985 that confiscated his family's entire estate and wealth with documented court value of $31 million (adjusted for inflation, exceeding $100 million). Following his subsequent imprisonment, He was released with an intervention of the United States government. His business that supplied gold to the National Bank of Ethiopia and precious stones to the European fashion industry from his offices in Rome and Los Angeles ceased operations due to the protest from his American and Italian partners who cancelled the contracts that generated millions of dollars in foreign currency reserves for the government. As a result of the injustice committed against Lij Kifle Seifu, he relocated the rest of his family to the United States where he remained for the remainder of his life until he died at age 94 on Ethiopian Christmas day December 7, 2022 due to natural causes. His wife of 62 years Lady Almaz Zeleke, also from the Shewan branch of the Ethiopian aristocracy whose father Lij Zeleke Giref served as the long time Director General of the Ethio-Djibouti Railway Company, passed away at the age of 87 on the day of the Assumption of the Virgin Mary, August 22, 2025.

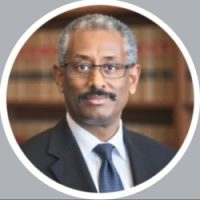
Daniel Kifle Seifu

He is survived by his eldest son and heir to his honors Lij Daniel Kifle Seifu Lij Daniel Kifle Seifu, Lij Elias Kifle Seifu, Lij Brook Kifle Seifu and his daughter Lady Elizabeth Kifle Seifu.
