= Workneh =

Workneh is an Ethiopian masculine given name. Notable people with the name include:

- Workneh Eshete (1864–1952), Ethiopian medical doctor and intellectual
- Workneh Gebeyehu, Ethiopian politician

The name Workneh translates to "You are gold" for a male. It translates to "Worknesh" for a female.
