= Kebede Michael =

Ethiopian author (1916–1998)

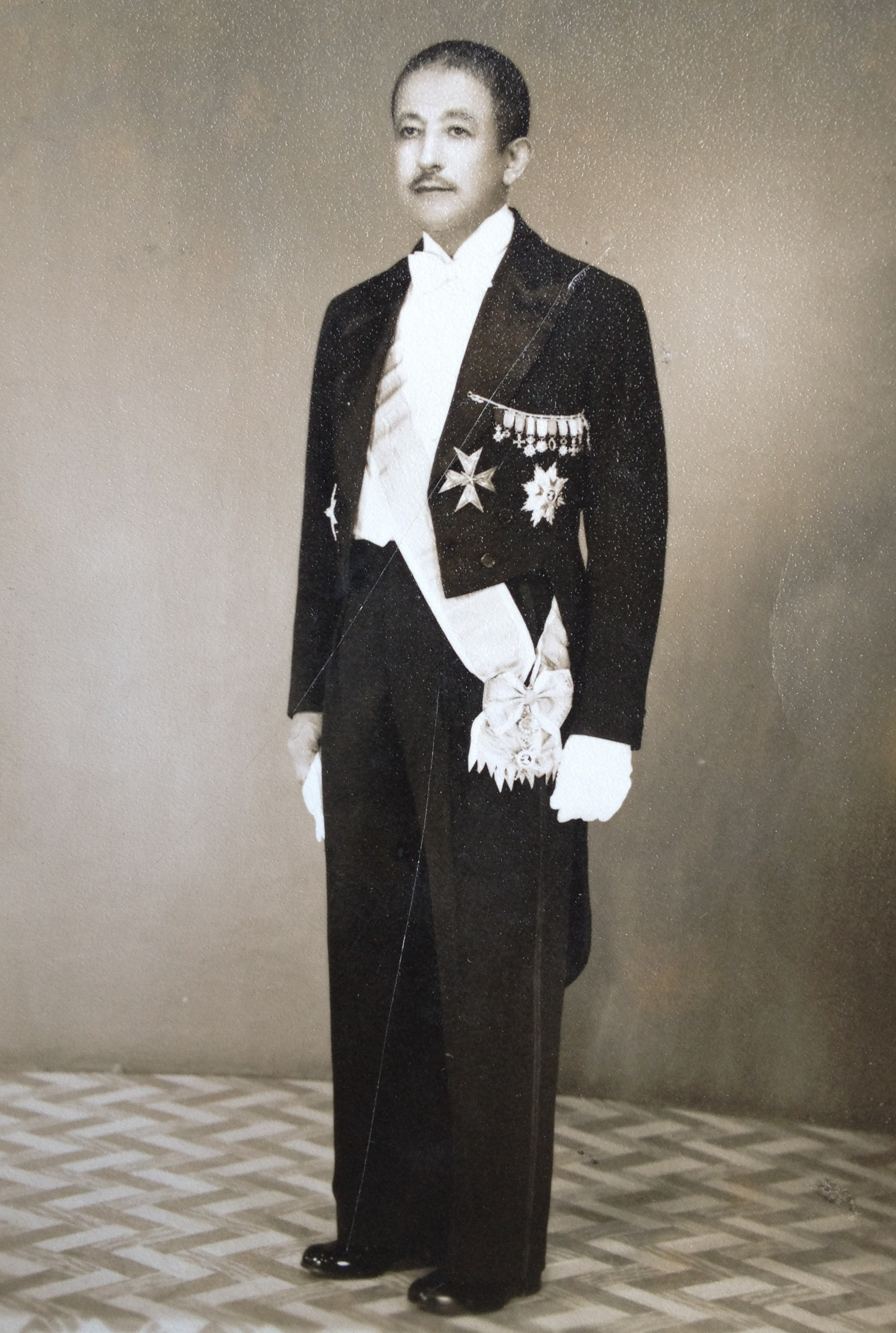
- Kebede in the 1960s
- Born: 2 November 1916; Menz, Shewa Province, Ethiopian Empire
- Died: 12 November 1998 (aged 82)
- Education: Alliance Éthio-Française School
- Occupations: Author; Playwright; Poet; Historian; Novelist; Journalist
- Years active: 1929–1998
- Political party: Ethiopian People's Revolutionary Party
- Awards: Honorary Doctorate (Addis Ababa University)
- Writing career
- Language: Amharic
- Period: Modernism
- Genres: Fiction; non-fiction; poetry; plays; essays; journalism
- Subjects: Patriotism; religion; art; morality
- Notable work: Tarik Ena Misale: Ethiopian Tale (2013)

Kebede Michael (Amharic: ከበደ ሚካኤል; 2 November 1916 – 12 November 1998) was an Ethiopian-born author of both fiction and non-fiction literature. He is widely regarded as one of the most prolific and versatile intellectuals of modern Ethiopia – he was a poet, playwright, essayist, translator, historian, novelist, philosopher, journalist, and government minister belonging to the Shewa Amhara nobility and member of the Solomonic dynasty. His maternal ancestor was King Sahle Selassie of Shewa.

He has produced about ninety published works in several languages, some of which have been translated into foreign languages, and have greatly influenced twentieth-century Ethiopian literature and intellectual thought. He has received ample recognition domestically and internationally, including an Honorary Doctorate from Addis Ababa University. He is well known as one of the mid-twentieth-century Japanizing Ethiopian intellectuals.

== Early life ==
Kebede Mikael was born on 2 November 1916 in Menz Gerim Gabriel in the Semien Shewa Zone of the Amhara Region to Ato Aytaged and Woizero Atsede Mikael. Soon after his birth, his father left the country and vanished. Hence Kebede Mikael came to be known under his mother's last name, instead of his father's as prescribed by the standard Ethiopian naming tradition. His uncle Lij Seifu Mikael became his father figure and would raise him into adulthood.

== Education ==
Kebede Mikael attended Ethiopian Orthodox Täwaḥədo Church education, starting at a very young age. It is reported that his grandmother, Wolete Gabriel, took him to his first day of church education at the age of four at his nearby Gerim Gabriel church that was founded and built by his great-grandfather Dejazmatch Mekuria Tesfaye, one of Emperor Menelik II's generals and cousins. His mother is said to have instilled a sense of ethics in him by raising him with Christian values, and telling him stories from the Bible. By the age of nine, he had learned much of the traditional church education and had a good mastery of the church language Ge’ez. In about 1924, when his mother and grandmother moved to Arusi, today's Arsi for work, he went instead to his uncle Lij Seifu Mikael in Addis Ababa where he joined the Catholic Cathedral School as a boarding student. His mother moved back to Addis Ababa in 1929 during which time he was enrolled in the best boarding school in Ethiopia at the time, Alliance Éthio-Française School with the help of his uncle Lij Seifu Mikael who was a Sorbonne-educated Ethiopian scholar and an important imperial government official. It is said that he grew tired of the punishments by teachers at the school, and thus switched to Lazarist Catholic Mission School for some time. Then, when matters at his former school improved, he switched back to Alliance Éthio-Française. In between, upon his uncle's appointment to administer parts of Harer, the 13-year-old Kebede Mikael befriended Prince Mekonnen and was tasked with tutoring him.

Kebede Mikael studied at Alliance Éthio-Française for three years before he got the opportunity to be introduced to the art of literature through the school director, a Lebanese man called Malhabi. The director was himself a novelist and thus wanted to teach the art of writing fiction to six outstanding students of his choice in his own house, and one of the six students was the young Kebede Mikael who had already gone through his uncle's library. The lessons were given in French, and Kebede Mikael proved to be highly proficient and hard-working. During his student years, Kebede Mikael proved that he was highly receptive to learning: he had a strong affinity for the French language, and earned high grades in his French exams. Taking note of his apt command of the French language and his high potential, his school officials recommended him for a scholarship opportunity under the then monarch, Emperor Haile Selassie I. Also impressed by his abilities, the Emperor granted him a full scholarship to go to France and pursue his studies. However excited Kebede Mikael was about the unique opportunity, he could not make use of it because he fell ill at that time. At the suggestion of his uncle, alternative arrangements were set up so that he could instead stay in the palace while he recovered and served as one of three French teachers to Prince Makonnen, the emperor's son, alongside French instructors visiting from France. The plan to send him to France for further French instruction was thwarted by the onset of the five-year war with Italy (1936–1941), particularly because of the declaration of the Battle of Maychew (1936). It would be the second time for Kebede Mikael to tutor Prince Mekonnen.

Kebede Mikael was an avid reader. Although his formal education did not extend beyond high school, his writing was informed by his vast reading, as he revealed in an interview with Yekatit, a widely read Ethiopian newspaper, in September 1980. From his readings, Kebede Mikael was greatly influenced by the teachings of prominent Ethiopians such as his own uncle Lij Seifu Mikael, Aleka Atsimegiorgis, Aleka Kidanewold Kifle, Professor Afework Gebreyesus, Negadras Gebre-Hiwot Baykedagn and Kegn-geta Yoftahe Negussie. At home and school, he used the resources provided by his family and teachers to carefully study the Who's Whos of Greek, Roman, English, French, German, Russian, and Italian philosophers and scientists. His uncle Lij Seifu's wife Sarah Workneh introduced the young Kebede to English literature. She was the first Ethiopian to translate the works of Williams Shakespeare into Amharic language. Her father was Ethiopia's first Western educated medical doctor Workneh Eshete

== Italo-Ethiopian War (1936–1941) ==
During the occupation, his uncle and guardian Lij Seifu Mikael was captured and sent off to the Asinara prison in Italy. Atsede's husband Dejazmatch Melise Sahle submitted to the fascist occupying force. At the behest of his stepfather, he was employed in the fascist government as a liaison between the Italian officials and the Ethiopian nobility as well as in their Department of Information, then called "Office of Propaganda". Due to the unique access he had to high-level Italian officials and his command of the Italian language, he passed on important intel to the patriots fighting for the country's liberation. Upon hearing his employment at the occupying fascist government, his incarcerated uncle Lij Seifu wrote: "he is an ailing, frail, weak boy who stood no chance in guerilla warfare; let him make use of his brains to assist the resistance." After repeated requests by him and Leul Ras Seyoum Mengesha, his uncle Lij Seifu was released from Asinara after about four years. He reached Addis Ababa four months before the liberation and was ordered to stay under house arrest at his own residence. Even though Kebede could not go to France and pursue his studies because of the Italo-Ethiopian War, he spent a lot of time reading in the library founded by Mr. LeMoins, one of the French instructors of Prince Makonnen. It is reported that one of the books he most frequently read was Napoleon because he had a great admiration for Napoleon Bonaparte. He also picked up Italian during those years of extensive reading and learning. Italian was only one of the many languages he spoke. He wrote Berhane Helina (The Light of the Mind), which is largely considered his debut, during these years. He also wrote Ye Qine Wubet (The Beauty of Qəne) in which he proved his command of the unique Ethiopian literary tradition of qene, a form of linguistic indirection and play.

== Political career ==
After the defeat of Fascist Italy, Kebede Mikael served in the government in several capacities between 1941 and 1974 (when Emperor Haile Selassie was deposed). He served as a journalist and radio program announcer; then as Inspector and Vice Director, and later, Director General of the Ministry of Education; as Director General and head representative as well as translator in the Ministry of Foreign Affairs (1950); Director of the Ethiopian Postal Office; Director of His Imperial Majesty's Private Information Cabinet; and Director of the National Archives and Library of Ethiopia (1952). Kebede Mikael also participated in important international conferences as a special representative extraordinary and plenipotentiary of the Ethiopian government. He was a regular Ethiopian delegate to numerous international conferences at the United Nations in New York.

Even while holding these positions, Kebede Michael did not stop writing. He published a total of 26 books during these thirty-three years of government service.

== Later life and death ==
It is said that Kebede Mikael faced many struggles after the revolution of 1974 when the Derg toppled the imperial monarchy headed by Emperor Haile Selassie. His extended family members were either in the Derg prison, executed, or fled the country. His cousin, Lij Seifu's son, Kifle Seifu, a prominent businessman of the time was already languishing in the communist Derg prison while his younger brothers were not able to return to Ethiopia from their studies in the U.S. because of the revolution. The family's vast estate that included the National Theater, Ras Hotel, and the vicinity stretching to the Artistic Printing Press, as well as farms, manufacturing, and export businesses run by Kifle and other family members, were all nationalized. The stately mansion of the Seifu Mikael family around the Wabi Shebele Hotel that was built during Emperor Menelik II's time and later expanded and modernized during the following three monarchs was confiscated. To some admirers' dismay, his personal residence was nationalized by the Derg in 1975 because Kebede was believed to have benefitted from the previous feudal regime and, as a result, he led most of his remaining life alternating between the Awraris and Tourist Hotels in Addis Ababa as residences. Ever since the Derg regime confiscated it, Kebede house has gone through an unusual series of rebranding and remodeling efforts: since 1974, it has been used as an office of the local Derg rulers, then a prison for their inmates, a clinic, a bar, a billiard ball game center, and, as recently as 2012, the Menaheriya Hotel, Bar and Restaurant. Residents of the vicinity and his admirers express their disappointment that "his walls, which once were stacked end to end by book shelves, are now stacked with alcohol." There has been a call for concerned parties to memorialize his name and legacy in the space. Some sources also claim that he faced some discrimination based on rumors of mental illness in his late years. Those who were children during the Emperor Haile Selassie's regime recall that the emperor used to visit Kebede Mikael and greet the village children, and give them 2 Ethiopian birr.

Kebede Mikael died at the age of 82 on 12 November 1998. June 28 has been designated as a memorial day in Ethiopia to commemorate him.

== Honors and recognition ==
Kebede Mikael was the first-ever winner of the Haile Selassie I Prize Award in Amharic Literature in 1964, a prestigious award that was later conferred on other Ethiopian literary giants such as Tsegaye Gebre-Medhin.

In November 1997, Kebede Mikael received an Honorary Doctorate Degree from Addis Ababa University for his unparalleled excellence in literature and his role as an inspiration to generations of Ethiopian authors and writers.

He also received distinguished awards from the governments of other countries, such as France, Germany, Italy, the USSR and Mexico.

Those who knew him closely say that he loved to go to church and was a very polite and spiritual man.

== Literary works ==
Kebede's literary works reflect the many facets of Ethiopian character and behavior during his time. The contents of his books touch upon history, education, development, philosophy, religion, culture, science, ethics and morals, and so on. About five of his books have been translated into the French and English languages. In all his works, Kebede used simple Amharic words that can be comprehended by anyone with basic schooling. His translated works presented new, foreign concepts in localized and contextualized words that any Ethiopian could easily understand.

A respected multilingual speaker, Kebede Michael spoke over four languages, including Amharic, Ge'ez, English, French and Italian. He also wrote in or translated from these languages. He produced a plethora of original and translated works – ninety of them published and two hundred unpublished. Later on, in the time of the Derg military regime, it is said that Kebede was so frustrated with the tyranny and harassment of the state that he burned a lot of his unpublished works.

At least two of his works, Berhane Helina and YeQine Wubet, were written during the Italo-Ethiopian War, but the majority were published after the war. Some were reprinted four times and more due to popular demand. He has produced several poems, plays, anthologies of qene poetry, history books, translations, fictions, essays, and philosophical works regarding modernization.

Kebede's most prominent translated work is his Amharic translation of Shakespeare's Romeo and Juliet. This Amharic version of the play was composed of rhyming verses. He received great acclaim for this work because not only did he show his linguistic competence, but he also combined his poetic talent and play-writing prowess into a single text that flowed beautifully. He also translated Shakespeare's Macbeth, and Charlotte M. Brame’s Beyond Pardon into Amharic.

From 1940 to 1970, Kebede Michael wrote Amharic-language textbooks in which he provided several generations of Ethiopian students with literature covering a wide range of issues and disciplines.

Below is an incomplete list of his works.

=== Educational ===
- የዕውቀት ብልጭታ (Yeweket Bellichta) [A Spark of Knowledge] (1950)
- የመዠመሪያ እርምጃ (Yemejemeriya Ermija) [First Step]
- ታሪክና ምሳሌ 1, 2, 3 (Tarikena Missalie) [Proverbs]
- ታላላቅ ሰዎች (Talalaq Sewoch) [Great People in History] (1963)
- የዓለም ታሪክ ፩ኛ ክፍል (Ye’alem Tarik, Kifil 1) [History of the World, Part 1] (1955)
- ጃፓን እንደምን ሰለጠነች? (Japan Indemin Seletenech?) [How Did Japan Modernize?]
- የሥልጣኔ አየር (Yesilitane Ayer) [The Breeze of Civilization]
- ኢትዮጵያና ምዕራባዊ ሥልጣኔ (Ityopya Ena Me’erabawi Selitane) [Ethiopia and Western Civilisation] [L'Ethiopie et la civilisation occidentale] – originally written in Amharic (1949); translated into French and English by Marcel Hassid

=== Poems and qene ===
- ብርሃነ ሕሊና (Berhane Helina) [The Light of the Mind]
- የቅኔ አዝመራ (YeQine Azmera) [A Meadow of Qəne]
- ሙዚቃ (Muzika) [Music]
- የቅኔ ውበት (YeQine Wubet) [The Beauty of Qəne]
- የድርሰት ትንሣዔ (Yedirset Tinsae) [The Resurrection of Writing]

=== Plays ===
- የትንቢት ቀጠሮ (Ye Tinbit Ketero) [Prophesy Fulfilled?] (1947)
- አኒባል (Anibal) [Hannibal]
- በላይነህ/ የቅጣት ማዕበል (Belayneh/Ye Qitat Ma'ebel) [A Storm of Punishments]
- ካሌብ (Kaleb)
- አክዐብ (Ak’ab)
- ቅዱስ ገብርኤል በምድረ ገነት (Kidus Gabriel Be Midre Ghenet) [St. Gabriel in Heaven]

=== History ===
- ግርማዊነታቸው ባሜሪካ አገር (Girmawinetachew BeAmerica Ager) [His Highness Emperor Haile in America] (Hard Cover – 1966)
- የኢትዮጵያ የጥንት ስእሎች (YeEthiopia Yetint S'eloch) [Old Ethiopian Paintings] (Paper cover – 1969) – in Amharic, French and English

== Era of Japanization ==
Kebede Mikael is one of the most prominent of the Ethiopian Japanizing intellectuals, writing one of his most prominent books on the topic: Japan Indemin Seletenech? (Amharic: ጃፓን እንደምን ሰለጠነች?, translate: How Did Japan Become Civilized?). The Japanese miracle after the Second World War "provided a model for other Asian and African countries in their quest for rapid modernization"; so much so that the Japanese founded a famous and well-endowed institution, Institute of Developing Economies to aid those interested in the Japanese model. There was heavy focus on emulating the Japanese developmental and political model in twentieth-century Ethiopia. The popular Ethiopian historian Bahru Zewde writes that intellectuals of the early as well as mid-twentieth century called for "Japanization" and the "rapid development" of Ethiopia is to sustain its independence and pride.

In his book on the topic, Kebede provided a summary of how the Japanese aristocracy managed to build a strong, self-supporting, and technologically advanced state under the Meiji Dynasty, and drew lessons from Japan for Ethiopia. He recommended that since Ethiopia and Japan have many socio-economic and political similarities, Ethiopian policy should follow Japan's footsteps toward an advanced economy in the shortest possible time. He pointed out striking similarities between Ethiopian and Japanese histories in the late nineteenth and early twentieth centuries, such as the fact that they were both peoples of color who enjoyed victories over White European colonizers (Ethiopia against Italy in 1896, and Japan against Russia in 1905); withstood imperial powers in prior history (Japan against the Mongols in the 1280s, Ethiopia against the Ottoman Turks in the 1580s); and drove out Portuguese missionaries at about the same time (during the seventeenth century) to preserve their religions. Politically, both countries were isolated from the world for about 250 years during the medieval period and both states were feudalistic with steep hierarchies. Kebede wrote that Japan had charted its own course and had maintained its independence in the world, through education. Like other Japanizers before the Italian invasion, he hoped that Ethiopia would learn from the Japan model. He also pointed out the differences separating the two countries: Japan was more developed relative to Ethiopia even before its contact with the West, especially in shipbuilding and arms manufacture, and Japan had adopted European ways with remarkable speed, while Ethiopia was much slower. Also different was that what Ethiopian intellectuals had most feared—the loss of independence if Ethiopia failed to modernize—had already occurred during the Italian occupation of 1936–1941.

There were several attempts to emulate the Japanese economic model in Ethiopia, including the crafting of the contents of the first constitution of Ethiopia in 1931 after the 1889 Japanese constitution. Though these efforts were interrupted by the Italo-Ethiopian War, it was scholars like Kebede Mikael who kept the dream of Japanization alive after the Italian invasion was over in 1941. Keeping the hope of Japanization alive even after the expulsion of the Italians and the Second World War, there was not much progress made before the dictatorial military regime took over in 1974, and negatively impacted the economy, with population growth surpassing expansion in food production, agricultural productivity decreasing, and the country experiencing a severe famine in 1984-85.

Ultimately, the Japanizer movement in Ethiopia failed, and the scholar Clarke writes that Kebede Mikael's yearnings illustrated a problem, as signaled in Bahru Zewde's criticism of Japanizers. Zewde argues that it is more worthwhile to compare the Japanese victory over Russia in 1905 with Ethiopia's defeat in 1935 and 1936 by the Italians, instead of comparing it with the Adwa victory of 1896, because the Japanese victory was the logical outcome of three decades of fundamental transformation of Japanese society, whereas the Ethiopian defeat "was the penalty for the failure to modernize." Even before the Meiji reformation, Japan had attained a higher state of social development, literacy, agricultural commercialization and specialization than had Ethiopia in the twentieth century.

== Legacy and influence ==
Kebede Mikael has influenced Ethiopian thought, identity, and government through his writing and service in office. His textbooks and general knowledge works have informed the values of young Ethiopian students and widened their literary understanding. Bahru Zewde also writes that Kebede Mikael's writing contributed a lot to the cultural vibrancy of the 1960s.

Kebede Mikael's avid support of Japanization informed the development theory and strategy of his contemporary Ethiopia. Even in the present regime, the tendency to emulate East Asian countries' development models is still seen, as during the rule of Prime Minister Meles Zenawi, who was set on mirroring South Korean and Taiwanese growth in Ethiopia.

Some Ethiopian scholars such as Ghelawdewos Araia subscribe to Kebede Mikael's vision for Ethiopian unity and call the present generation "to carefully read the vision of Kebede Mikael and seriously consider the currently prevailing narrow and annoying hate politics." Araia notes that he subscribes to Kebede Mikael's vision for unity and development because "Kebede Mikael uniquely combines both patriotism and a development vision."

Kebede Mikael also influenced and inspired other Ethiopian literary figures through his works. Tesfaye Gessesse, one of the transformers of Ethiopian theatre, who started out as an actor and later on headed the National Theater in Addis Ababa, writes about how crucial Kebede Mikael's play, Yetinbit Qetero was in informing his passion for theatre, saying:

When I was in elementary school, I watched a play entitled 'Yetinbit Qetero'. The play was written and staged by Kebede Mikael ... I was able to learn by heart Kebede's poem entitled 'Iroro'.

No other Ethiopian in the country's history so far has been able to write as extensively on as wide a variety of disciplines as did Kebede Mikael. His contributions to the development of education and literature in Ethiopia were significant.

Sahle Selassie B.Mariam writes that while we associate most other authors with a single, emblematic work, Kebede Mikael produced many: "[i]n the case of Kebede Michael ... what echoes in our [Ethiopians’] heads is the idea of him as more of an institution than the title of any one book... That institution is the collectivity of Kebede Mikael's literary production."
