= Ethiopian prisoners of war during the Second Italo-Ethiopian War =

During the Second Italo-Ethiopian War, the Italians captured and either imprisoned as prisoners of war or executed selected prominent Ethiopians. The majority of the public executions and mass incarcerations happened in the wake of the assassination attempt on Rodolfo Graziani. The Italian occupying force gave permission to the black shirts to murder educated Ethiopians, sparing only a few notables who were transported to various concentration camps maintained in the Harar region, Italian Somaliland, Eritrea and Italy. While the majority of prisoners who were kept at Asinara and other camps in Italy survived, tens of thousands of detainees perished under the severe conditions they were forced to live in. According to famous survivors like Ambassador Imru Zeleke, conditions were worse in Italian Somaliland camps due to the scarcity of food, water and medicine. According to Imru Zeleke, tens of thousands of Ethiopians died every year.

Princess Romanework Haile Selassie, Emperor Haile Selassie's daughter and the wife of Dejazmatch Beyene Merid, would later contract tuberculosis and was transferred to Ospedale Maggiore in Turin from Asinara, where she died on 14 October 1940. She was the only child of the Emperor who was captured. Woizero Denknesh Teklemariam and Lij Abate Mulat were among the young prisoners at Asinara. Lij Abate was captured with the renowned patriot Ras Desta Damtew. Woizero Denknesh was rounded up with her parents who were all imprisoned on the Italian island. While the fascist forces executed the Ras and select patriots, they shipped off other notable prisoners to Asinara and elsewhere. In the picture seen below were a group of Ethiopian POWs held at one of the island prisons in Italy.

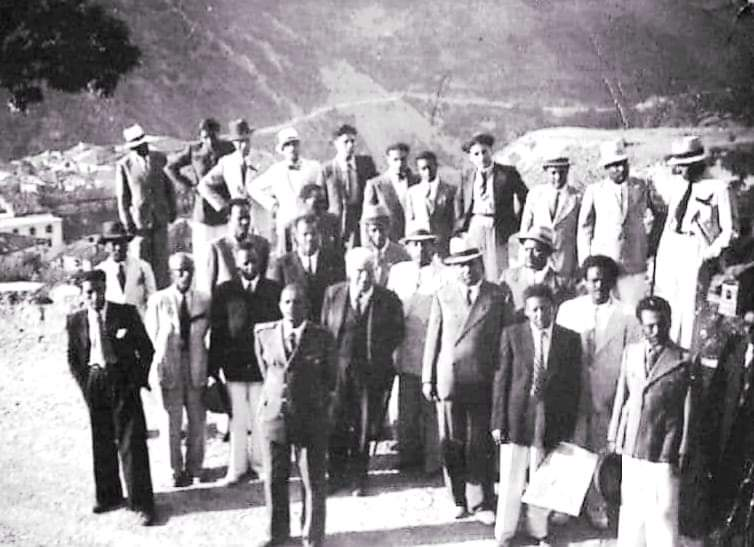
Highly educated and influential members of the Ethiopian Nobility and intelligentsia

== Asinara prison camp ==
It is virtually impossible to find out the exact number of Ethiopian POWs who were imprisoned at different camps. The Asinara prison camp is an exception, due to its location in Europe and due to the personalities of the incarcerated individuals, the identities of many of the POWs and their approximate number became available through the years from people who kept records of their experiences in captivity. According to the book "Etsub Dinq" written in Amharic by Balemberas Mahateme Selassie Wolde Meskel who was one of the prisoners at Asinara, the total number of prisoners was well over 400. He came up with names of close to 279 notables he remembered. Ras Imru Haile Selassie spent a few months at Asinara and later transferred to another detention camp where Ras Seyoum Mengesha was kept before the former's repatriation by the orders of Amedeo, 3rd Duke of Aosta, the Viceroy and Governor General of Italian East Africa. Ambassador Imru Zelleke was never incarcerated outside of East Africa. In the picture below, LtoR unidentified Ethiopian, Lij Seifu Mikael and Dejazmatch Girmachew TekleHawariat at Asinara Island.

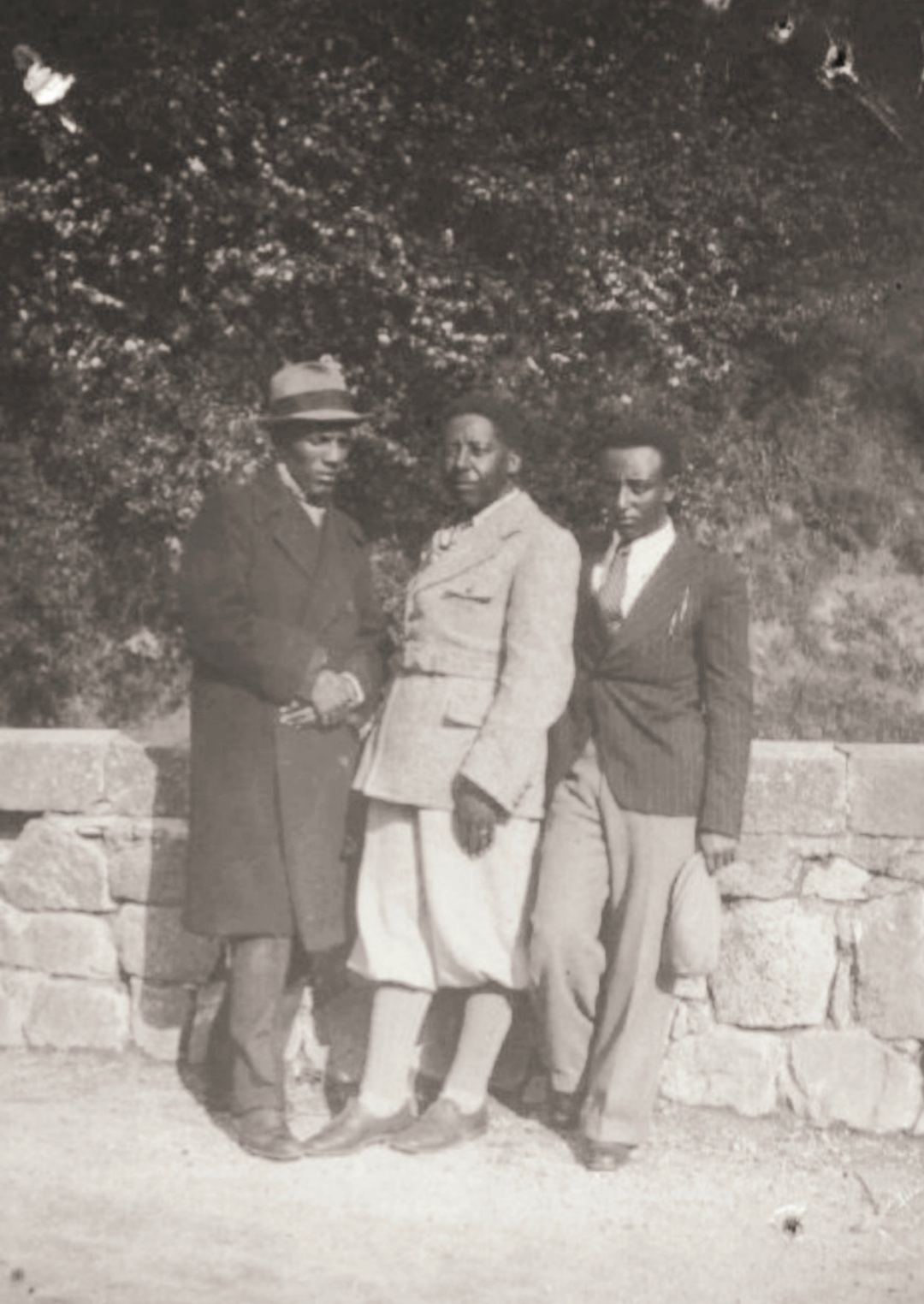
Members of the Ethiopian nobility held captives at Asinara

=== List of Ethiopian POWs at Asinara ===
The prisoners held on Asinara are as follows:

1. Princess Romanework Haile Selassie
2. Lij Merid Beyene
3. Lij Samson Beyene
4. Lij Getachew Beyene
5. Lij Gideon Beyene
6. Lij Seifu Mikael
7. Woizero Sara Workneh
8. Woizero AtsedeWoin Heruy
9. Woizero Genet Heruy
10. Dejazmatch Girmachew TekleHawariat
11. Dejazmatch Teferra Mesfin
12. Woizero Ketsela Tullu
13. Kentiba Gebru Desta
14. Woizero Senedu Gebru
15. Emahoy YewubDar Gebru
16. Woizero Desta Gebru
17. Woizero Genet Gebru
18. Ato Wagaye Gebru
19. Ato Misew Gebru
20. Ato Bobi Gebru
21. Woizero ShewaReged Gedle
22. Ato Kifle Wodajo
23. Balambaras MahitemeSellasie WoldeMeskel
24. Lij Minase Asfaw
25. Dejazmatch Habte'Mikael Yinadu
26. TsehafeT'ezaz WoldeMeskel Tariku
27. Fitawrari LeulSeged Wendyirad
28. Lij Hiwot Wendyirad
29. Balambaras LeulSeged Yimer
30. NegaDires Gebre-Egziabher François
31. Woizero Aster Workneh
32. Kegnazmacth Habte'Mikael Birru
33. Ato Lema Shurte
34. Kegnazmatch Lema Bisewur
35. Girazmatch Legesse Gizaw
36. Kegnazmatch LeulSeged Deneke
37. Lij Liben Gebrehiwot
38. Ato LisaneWerk WeldeMikael
39. Weizero Hamere Eshete
40. Shiek Mohammed Shafi
41. Lij Mesay WendBewesen
42. Girazmatch Mesha Wenberu
43. Kegnazmatch Meshesha
44. Dejazmatch Metaferia MelkeTsedek
45. Dejazmatch Mengesha Wube
46. Ato Mekonnen Tesema
47. Ato Mekonnen WoldeYohannes
48. Dejazmatch Mekonnen Wosene
49. Ato Mekonnen WendAwik
50. Ato Mekonnen GebreHiwot
51. Lij Mulugeta Bezabih
52. Weizero Mamite
53. Ato Mamo BehsaWured
54. Ato Markos ManAmnoh
55. Ato Markos Reta
56. Ato Masresha
57. Weizero ManYahilishal Kassa
58. Weizero Mintiwab Tekle
59. Ato Minda HabteSellasie
60. Kegnazmatch Mola Wenberu
61. Ato SahileMariam Sifeta..
62. Fitawrari SahileGiorgis Nadew
63. Blatten Geta Sahle Tsedalu
64. Dejazmatch Seyoum Desta
65. Balambaras Reda
66. Woizero Roza
67. Ato SelaDingay Tilahun
68. Ato Senbeta Bedane
69. Woizero Sara GebreEyesus
70. Ato Samuel Gebreyes
71. Lij Sileshi Bezabih
72. Ato Sileshi WendBewesen
73. Sheik Shofe
74. Girazmatch Belew Tessema
75. Ato Belachew Yadete
76. Dejazmatch Belay Ali
77. Ato Berehe
78. Ato Bekele Senbete
79. Ato Bekele Kiros
80. Ato Bekele GebreTsadik
81. Woizero Bekelu Kassa
82. Girazmatch Bedasso Abdulahi
83. Ato BeFekadu WoldeMikael
84. Girazmatch Biyad'gilign
85. Ato Benedeto AtnafeAlem
86. Ato Birhane HabteMikael
87. Ato Birhane Markos
88. Lij BirhaneSellasie Yibsaa
89. Fitawrari Temesgen Bitew
90. Ato Temune
91. Lij Terefe WoldeGabriel
92. Blatta Tessema Belhu
93. Balambaras Tessema Ali
94. Blatta Tessema Debalke
95. Ato Tesfaye Tegegn
96. Dejazmatch Tesfa Tiku
97. Meli'ake Genet Tesfaye
98. Ato Teshome Minda
99. Girazmatch Tebeje
100. Ato TekleMariam Kassahun
101. Woizero Tewabech Ze'Amanuel
102. Girazmatch Tedla HaileGiorgis
103. Ato Tefera Lewetegn
104. Fitawrari Tefera Mesfin
105. Lij Teferi Bezabih
106. Ato Tefera'Werk Kidane'Weld
107. Lij Tadesse Wolde'Giorgis
108. Ato Tafesse Gessese
109. Ato Tewodros Workneh
110. Kegnazmatch HaileMikael Haji Bilto
111. Lij HaileMikael Zewde
112. Ato HaileMikael Fetene
113. Girazmatch HaileMariam Gessese
114. Dejazmatch HaileSellasie Aba Je'Bel
115. Azazh HaileSellasie Megenu
116. Kegnazmatch HaileTsion Kawotona
117. Ato Haili Markos
118. Dejazmatch Hailu Tesfaye
119. Ato Haile Bahir
120. Ato Haile Tessema
121. Balmbaras Haile GetaBicha
122. Lij Haile WoldeMeskel
123. Fitawari Haile WoldeTsadik
124. Kegnazmatch Haile Digua'Wuhaw
125. Ato Haile Digua'Wuhaw
126. Kegnazmatch Nigatu Beshe
127. Ato Alito
128. Kadi Ahmed
129. Kegnazmatch Amare GebreMariam
130. Ato Areke GebreHiwot
131. Woizero Aselefech
132. Woizero Asegedech
133. Ato Aseffa Mola
134. Ato Aseffa Solomon
135. Girazmatch Asres Tessema
136. Woizero Askale WoldeAmanuel
137. Woizero Askale Wosenne
138. Fitawrari Asfaw Man'Aye
139. Balambaras Asfaw TekleMariam
140. Girazmatch Asfaw Tamene
141. Ato Asfaw Andarge
142. Ato Asfaw Ali
143. Balambaras Asfaw WoldeGiorgis
144. Ato Asfaw GebreYohannes
145. Ato Asfaw FikreSellasie
146. Blatta Ashine KidaneMariam
147. Ato Abera Shih'New
148. Balambaras Abera Ketema
149. Woizero Abebech Abegaz
150. Woizero Abebech Cherkose
151. Girazmatch Abebe Nake
152. Dejazmatch Abebe Ayelewerk
153. Ato Abebe WoldeTsasdik
154. NegaDires Abebe Wolde
155. Bejirond Abegaz
156. Lij Abate Mulat
157. NegaDires Abayneh WoldeMikael
158. Ato Amberbir Abebe
159. Woizero Ayelech Birru
160. Ato Ayele Ali
161. Blatta Ayele Gebre
162. Dejazmatch Ayalew Birru
163. Fitawrari Ayalew Birru
164. Woizero AtnafeAlem GebreHiwot
165. AfeNigus AtnafSeged WoldeTsadik
166. Tsehafi Ti'ezaz AfeWerk
167. Ato Efrem Asfaw
168. Balambaras Emagnu Yimer
169. NegaDires Eshete Teketelew
170. Ato Eshete Hailu
171. NegaDires Eshete Wube
172. Aleka Estifanos
173. Kegnazmatch Kebede Meshesha
174. Dejazmatch Kebede Aragaw
175. Girazmatch Kebede Tasew
176. Kegnazmatch Keterew WoldeAregay
177. Blatta KidaneMariam Abera
178. Ato Kassa Maru
179. Dejazmatch Kassa Sibhat
180. Woizero Kassa Yelemitu
181. Girazmatch Kassa Raklis
182. Ato Kosros Bogosian
183. Woizero WoleteKidan Mamo
184. Yitot WoleteYes
185. Woizero Wolete Yohannes
186. Girazmatch WoldeMikael Desalegn
187. BlattenGeta WoldeMariam Ayele
188. Ato WoldeRufael Ashengo
189. Basha Wolde Sema'et
190. Ato WoldeSenbet Ayito
191. Kegnazmatch WoldeYes Ayele
192. Ato Wolde Gabriel
193. Fitawrari WoldeGiorgis Adem
194. Merigeta WoldeTsadik Aferu
195. Kegnazmatch WoldeTsadik Zegeye
196. Ato WoldeTsadik Zegeye
197. Ato Wolde Wossene
198. Lij Wossene Metaferia
199. Ato Workneh ZikArgachew
200. Ato Wondim Siamregn
201. NegaDires Wedajo Ali
202. Ato Amde Abera
203. Ato Umer Ibrahim
204. Ato Alemu Tekle
205. Basha Alemu
206. Ato Alemu Endashaw
207. Lij Aleme
208. Lij Zelleke Nigatu
209. Abba Zemede Birhan
210. Woizero Zenebech
211. Ato Zewde Tadesse
212. Zena AmdeMariam
213. Zimam Wodejao
214. Kegnazmatch YeshiNeh
215. Ato YetNeberk WoldeMeskel
216. Ato Yilma GebreKidan
217. Lij Yikum Abate
218. Ato Yibisa
219. Ato Yosef Ayele
220. Fitawrari Demise Habte-Selassie
221. Basha Demise Bedasa
222. Girazmatch Demise Abe
223. Ato Demise WoldeYes
224. Lij Dereje Mekonnen
225. Ato Desta Liben
226. Kentiba Desta Mitike
227. Fitawrari Desta AtnafSeged
228. Kegnazmatch Desta WeldeKiros
229. Woizero Desta WoldeMariam
230. Dejazmatch Dessalegn Cherinet
231. Ato Desalegn Abesha
232. Woizero Debritu Abnet
233. Kegnazmatch Dehne WoldeMariam
234. Balambaras Degefu Gebre
235. Woizero Dinknesh Teferi
236. Dinknesh BeshaWured
237. Woizero Dinknesh Dinkitu
238. Ato Dilnese
239. Ato Dua'ali Kadiye
240. Kadi Jami
241. Ato Gerime
242. Basha Gesesse Reda
243. Ras GebreHiwot Mikael
244. Ato GebreMikael Tesema
245. Blatta GebreMikael WoldeMeskel
246. Ato GebreMikael Selfako
247. Basha GebreMariam Surur
248. Ato GebreMariam Ewinetu
249. Ato GebreMariam Jimma
250. Abba Gebre-Selassie
251. Fitawrari Gebre-Selassie Aba Wurji
252. LiquLiqawunt Gebre-Ab
253. Lique Gebre-Kirstos Wolde-Yohannes
254. Ato GebreYes HabteGabriel
255. Ato GebreGiorgis GebreMariam
256. Ato GebreTsion Nigatu
257. Genet Tedla
258. Basha Gont Lante Yideru
259. Azazh Getahun Habte-Selassie
260. Ato GetaBicha Tsemiru
261. Fitawrari Gediwon Guangul
262. Balambaras Girma YayehYirad
263. Fitawrari Girma Mamo
264. Girazmatch Gibaw Gizaw
265. Girazmatch Gizaw Serawitu
266. Ligaba Tasew Walelu
267. Woizero Taitu Kebede
268. Afe Nigus Tilahun BeHabte
269. Azazh Tilaye Tesema
270. Ato Tilahun Cherinet
271. Ato Tigashaw Tsemiru
272. Woizero TiruWerk Aligaz
273. Tirunesh Wodere
274. Memhir Cherkos
275. Ato Tsegaye GebreTsadik
276. Kegnazmatch Tsige WerdeWerk
277. Kegnazmatch Tsige Yimamu
278. Woizero Tsehay Abeba AbaKoran
279. Kegnazmatch Tsemiru Gebre-Selassie
280. Fikade-Selassie Emagnu
281. Bejirond Fikre-Selassie Ketema
