= Emahoy Tsege Mariam Gebru =

Ethiopian composer and pianist, and nun (1923–2023)

- Born: Yewubdar Gebru; 12 December 1923; Addis Ababa, Ethiopian Empire
- Died: 26 March 2023 (aged 99); West Jerusalem, Israel
- Occupations: Composer; pianist; nun
- Years active: 1967–2008

Emahoy Tsege Mariam Gebru (Gəʿəz እማሆይ ፅጌ ማርያም ገብሩ ደስታ; born Yewubdar Gebru, 12 December 1923 – 26 March 2023), was an Ethiopian composer, pianist, and nun. She is generally known as Emahoy, a religious honorific.

== Biography ==
=== 1920s–1950s ===
Emahoy Tsege Mariam was born as Yewubdar Gebru in Addis Ababa, on 12 December 1923, to a wealthy Amhara family. Her given name Yewubdar means the most beautiful one in Amharic. Her mother was named Kassaye Yelemtu. Her father, Kentiba Gebru Desta, was a diplomat and the mayor of Gondar, a city in the Amhara region of Ethiopia. In 1929, she was sent with her sister, Senedu Gebru, to a boarding school in Basel, Switzerland, where she studied both piano and the violin. At the time, they were the first Ethiopian girls to receive education overseas. In 1933, Emahoy returned to Ethiopia, attending Empress Menen Secondary School.

During the Second Italo-Ethiopian War (1935–1937), Emahoy and her family were prisoners of war. They were sent by the Italians to a prison camp on the Italian island of Asinara and later to Mercogliano, near Naples. Three of her family members were murdered during this time period. After the war, Emahoy studied under the Polish-Jewish violinist, Alexander Kontorowicz, in Cairo. She returned to Addis Ababa because the hot climate in Cairo was making her ill. Her teacher Alexander Kontorowicz returned with her. When Emperor Haile Selassie appointed him as head of the Imperial Guard band, Emahoy would join Kontorowicz to perform piano compositions for the Emperor. During this time, Emahoy also became the first ever female secretary to work the ministry of foreign affairs in Ethiopia. She was denied permission to attend the Royal Academy of Music by senior official members surrounding Emperor Selassie, who opposed her leaving Addis Ababa. Following this, Emahoy became a nun in 1944, spending a decade living in a hilltop monastery in Addis Ababa, taking the title Emahoy and the religious name Tsegué-Maryam.

=== 1960s–1970s ===
She left the Addis Ababa convent and returned to her family where she composed music for the violin, piano and organ. With the help of Emperor Haile Selassie, her first record was released in Germany, in 1967. She wrote music in Germany during this time period in order to raise funds for homeless children.

=== 1980s–2023 ===
In 1984, Emahoy's mother died. She fled Ethiopia, settling in the Kidane Mehret Church in West Jerusalem, where she spent the rest of her life.

Emahoy died on 26 March 2023 in Jerusalem, at the age of 99. Her funeral was held at the Kidane Mehret Ethiopian Orthodox Church in Jerusalem, on 31 March 2023, where a piano which had belonged to her was played in tribute.

== Legacy ==
In 2007, The Emahoy Tsege Mariam Music Foundation was set up to help children in need, both in Africa and in the Washington, D.C. metro area, to study music by way of scholarships, camps, and various music-oriented programs.

In 2017, BBC Radio 4 released an audio documentary on Emahoy's life entitled The Honky Tonk Nun.

As of 2023, a biopic about Emahoy's life entitled Labyrinth of Belonging is being produced by The Emahoy Tsege Mariam Music Foundation.

== Music ==
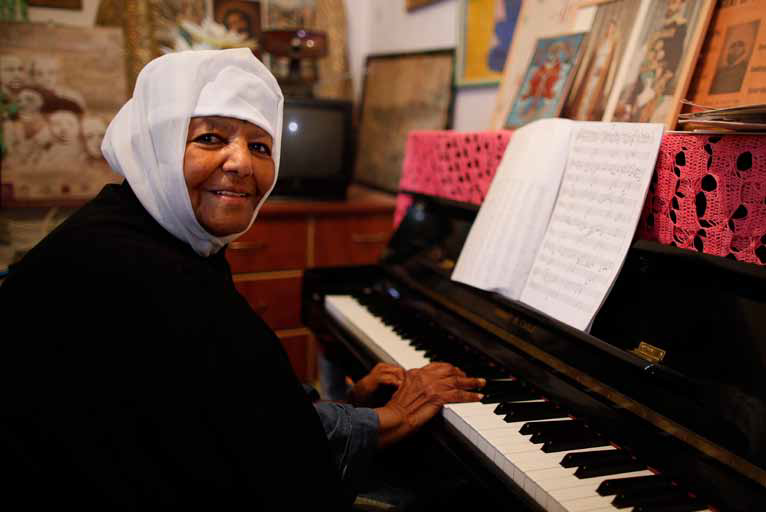
Emahoy, 2016.

Emahoy did not release any of her music made during the 1970s to the 1990s, due to the Derg party coup in 1974, which heavily policed non government or military oriented music. This led to a resurgence of Emahoy's compositions from the 1960s and 1970s when a compilation of Emahoy's work was issued on the Éthiopiques record label. The album Éthiopiques Volume 21: Ethiopia Song was released by Francis Falceto in 2006. Emahoy also appeared on the 2012 album The Rough Guide to the Music of Ethiopia, and the 2011 album The Rough Guide to African Lullabies.

For three decades, she lived a reclusive life with only rare performances, including one at the Jewish Community Center in Washington, D.C., on 12 July 2008. Three tribute concerts were held in Jerusalem in 2013 to mark her 90th birthday, and a compilation of her musical scores were released.

During her life, Emahoy composed over 150 songs for piano, organ, opera, and chamber ensembles.

=== Composition style ===
Emahoy's composition style has been described as a meld of various genres and musical scales. While her music has been described as both jazz and melodic blues piano with rhythmically complex phrasing, it has equally been described as having the musical quality of 19th century European romantic classical piano because of her use of tempo rubato. Simultaneously, she has employed the use of kiñit, tizita and bati, which are all qenets, or five note pentatonic musical scales specific to Ethiopian music. Some of Emahoy's compositions also possess chikchika rhythm, a 6/8 rhythm equally found often in Ethiopian heterophonic music. The melding of both European and Ethiopian compositional techniques can be specifically observed within her songs The Homeless Wanderer and Presentiment.

=== Musical comparisons ===
Previously, Emahoy's musical compositions have been compared to the following composers and/or pianists:

- Robert Schumann
- Frédéric Chopin
- Albert Ammons
- Count Basie
- Oscar Peterson
- Art Tatum
- Ludwig van Beethoven
- Teddy Wilson
- Keith Jarrett
- Erik Satie
- Scott Joplin
- Professor Longhair
- Johann Sebastian Bach
- Johannes Brahms

== In popular media ==
In 2019, an ad campaign entitled Coming Home for Amazon's Echo Auto and Echo Smart Speaker, created by advertising agency Wongdoody, featured a song by Emahoy Tsege Mariam titled Homesickness. Her music was featured in the soundtrack of the 2020 documentary Time. Two of her compositions were also featured in the 2021 Netflix movie Passing: The Homeless Wanderer (used in the official trailer) and The Last Tears of a Deceased. Her music is also featured in the 2024 Indian film All We Imagine As Light. Further, Emahoy's Evening Breeze and A Young Girl's Complaint have been featured in the 2021 film C’mon C’mon. Evening Breeze was also been featured in the 2023 film Yannick, which likewise includes her compositions Mad Man's Laughter, and The Homeless Wanderer. The latter had previously appeared in the 2016 film Porto, alongside Emahoy's piece Presentiment.

== Discography ==
=== Albums ===
- Spielt eigene Kompositionen, 1963. Reissued by Mississippi Records in 2022.
- The Hymn of Jerusalem. The Jordan River Song, 1970. Reissued by Mississippi Records in 2022 as Jerusalem.
- Yet My King Is from Old, Church Of Kidane Mehret, 1972.
- The Visionary: Piano Solo, Emahoy Tsegue Maryam Music Foundation, 2012.
- Emahoy Tsege Mariam Gebru, Mississippi Records, 2022.
- Souvenirs, Mississippi Records, 2024. Songs recorded on cassette between 1977 and 1985 by Emahoy.
- Church of Kidane Mehret, Mississippi Records, 2025. The album brings together the complete set of musical pieces from Emahoy’s self-released 1972 album of the same name, along with two previously unheard solo piano recordings.

=== Compilations ===
- Éthiopiques 21: Ethiopia Song, Buda Musique, 2006.
- Emahoy Tsegué-Mariam Guèbru, Mississippi Records, 2016.

== Video ==
- Maryam (Emahoy Tsegué Short) on YouTube : a video of Emahoy playing at the age of 89 in her final residence in Jerusalem. The song played is Presentiment.
