= Souvenirs (Emahoy Tsegué-Maryam album) =

Compilation album by Emahoy Tsege Mariam Gebru
- Released: 23 February 2024
- Recorded: Addis Ababa, 1977–1985
- Studio: Home recordings
- Length: 36:15
- Label: Mississippi Records

Emahoy Tsege Mariam Gebru chronology
Jerusalem (2023)	Souvenirs (2024)

Souvenirs is an album by Ethiopian musician Emahoy Tsegué-Maryam Guèbrou. Emahoy distributed the tracks on Souvenirs on homemade CD-Rs during her lifetime, and the album was compiled and posthumously reissued by US label Mississippi Records in February 2024. It is unique among Emahoy's albums for prominently featuring her vocals, sung in Amharic.

== Background and release ==
The tracks on Souvenirs were written and recorded by Emahoy in Addis Ababa, at the home of her family, in the years 1977–1985. She recorded the vocals by singing into a boombox placed on top of the piano while she played. Emahoy sold the tracks from the album on homemade CD-Rs, and they were not widely known in her lifetime.

Emahoy died in March 2023 at the age of 99, and the recordings on Souvenirs were found among boxes of cassette tapes she had left in her cell at the Kidane Mehret Church. Mississippi Records reissued the album on vinyl, CD, and cassette in February 2024. The album is now available on Spotify.

== Themes ==
On Souvenirs Emahoy sings about the political turmoil in Ethiopia that followed the Ethiopian Revolution in 1974. Emahoy and her family were forbidden from leaving Ethiopia during the Red Terror that followed the 1974 Ethiopian coup d'état. In 1984 Emahoy's mother died and she left Ethiopia, and eventually settled in the Kidane Mehret Church in Jerusalem, where she lived for the rest of her life. In a review for The Quietus Jakub Knera called Souvenirs "a document of exile and war made by a virtuoso, mesmerising pianist in supposed privacy." Pitchfork wrote that "throughout, Emahoy’s songwriting orients toward melancholic...the music of Souvenirs underlines Emahoy's pride in the beauty and breadth of life in Ethiopia."

== Critical reception ==
Professional ratings
Review scores
Source	Rating
Pitchfork	9.0/10
Songlines	4/5 stars
Spectrum Culture	90%

Jim Hickson of Songlines called Souvenirs a "special, touching album" but said that "this set doesn’t quite give the revelatory, otherworldly experience of Tsege-Mariam’s solo piano works." In a review for Pitchfork, Eric Torres called the album "a nourishing balm and an essential expansion of her available catalog." The Quietus wrote that "these compositions differ from anything previously released by the artist. You can hear the birds outside the window as Emahoy performs; it is intimate, you feel as if you are sitting beside her."

== Track listing ==
All tracks are written by Emahoy Tsege Mariam Gebru.

No.	Title	Length
1.	"Clouds Moving on the Sky"	5:10
2.	"Ready to Leave"	3:28
3.	"Is It Sunny Or Cloudy in the Land You Live?"	5:07
4.	"Tenkou! Why Feel Sorry?"	4:03
5.	"Ethiopia My Motherland"	5:06
6.	"Where Is the Highway of Thought?"	3:56
7.	"Don't Forget Your Country"	3:30
8.	"Like the Sun Shines on Meadows"	5:51
Total length:		36:15

== Personnel ==
- Reissue produced by Cyrus Moussav
- Co-Produced by Thomas Feng
- Tape Digitization by Albina Music Trust
- Mastering by Timothy Stollenwerk at Stereophonic
