= Senedu Gebru =

Ethiopian educator, writer and politician

Woizero Senedu Gebru

Senedu Gebru (Amharic: ሰንዱ ገብሩ; 13 January 1916 – 20 April 2009) was an Ethiopian educator, writer and politician. In 1957, she became the first Ethiopian woman elected to Parliament.

== Biography ==
=== Early life ===
Senedu Gebru was born on 13 January 1916 in Addis Alem, Menagesha, 30 km west of Addis Ababa. Her father, Gebru Desta, was a European-educated writer and former mayor of Addis Ababa and briefly president of the senate. Her mother, Kasaye Yelamtu, was an Ethiopian Orthodox Christian and raised her in the faith.

She was educated at the Swedish Mission School in Addis Ababa before being sent to Switzerland at the age 12, along with her sister, Emahoy Tsegué-Maryam Guèbrou. She did not like the school, so she was sent to a school in France, where she learned French and English. She also discovered a love for literature, and earned a degree in the subject at Lausanne University in Switzerland.

=== Return to Ethiopia ===
In 1933, she moved back to Ethiopia and took up a teaching post plays at Qidus Georgis (St. George) School in Addis Ababa and also acted as an interpreter for foreign journalists. She taught writing and literature and also worked with playwright Yoftahe Negussie on staging school plays, having taken part in some herself while abroad.

After a year of teaching, she married the well-known Blatta Lorénzo Ta'izaz and left Addis Ababa to Harar, where he was sent by the government. They returned to the capital 18 months later, where Lorénzo was given responsibility for information or propagation, and after his role within the government of Haile Selassie changed in the build up to the Italian invasion in 1935.

=== The Anti-Fascist Struggle ===
Senedu became politically active in the build up to the Italian invasion by making use of her contacts with foreign journalists who were writing about Ethiopia at the time. After the invasion she, and her brothers, soon became involved in active opposition to the occupying forces. With her husband accompanying the Emperor into exile, ending their marriage, she moved to Goré in Illubabor Province, where she joined with 100 cadets from a military academy and received some military training.

Her group travelled to Neqemte, where she tried to arouse resistance to the Italians and was nearly captured. Gebru moved back to Goré, where she joined the Black Lions and established a Red Cross Unit after receiving some medical training. Gebru served as an informant for the Black Lions about Italian troop movements. Eventually, after catching pneumonia, she was captured by the Italians and interrogated. Meanwhile, her brother was killed on 19 February 1937. She later wrote a play about this event. Her rebellious behaviour resulted in her being imprisoned on the Italian island of Asinara along with her father and sister.

She was repatriated to Ethiopia in 1939 and was briefly married to Dejjazmach Amede Ali Mikael, who is a nephew of Lij Iyasu and a grandson of Negus Mikael Ali. In 1941, following the liberation of the country, she took up a teaching post Weyzero Sihin School in Dessie.

=== Literary career ===
Senedu was appointed assistant director of the first girls' school in Ethiopia in 1943. She became headmistress two years later, a first in Ethiopian history. On her arrival she discovered that the current headteacher, an expatriate, had staged a nativity play for the emperor in 1942, with all the parts played by girls. Upon her own appointment has headmistress she staged another nativity for the royal family and went on to write and produce a further 20 plays between 1947 and 1955. These efforts were a way to help the students improve their public speaking abilities.

Aboneh explains that many of these plays dealt with the anti-fascist struggle, portraying Ethiopian heroism and martyrdom. She also turned to historical figures, such as Emperor Tewodros, Emperor Menilik and Emperor Haile Selassie, as well as social issues, including love and marriage. Loyalty to the current emperor is expressed throughout. Most were written and performed in Amharic, but a small number were in English.

Empress Menen School Cook Book

During these years she also contributed to The Empress Menan School Cook Book. In her preface she thanks the school's Ethiopian cookery teacher, Yengusenesh Flatie, as well as three foreigners who presumably contributed to the European' recipes: "Miss Jean Robertson, Miss Kerstin Olausson and Mrs. Siri Fog.

In 1950 she published her only book, Ye Libbie metsihaf (Book of My Heart), which contained two of her plays and some poems. She continued to write plays, but after she left the school to pursue her political career interest rapidly declined as no other committed teacher followed her.

=== Political career ===
In 1957 Senedu Gebru took up a seat in the Ethiopian Parliament, the first woman to do so. She was named vice president of the Chamber of Deputies on 22 November. In 1960 she became the Vice President of the Senate, and in 1966 General Secretary of the Ministry of Social Affairs.

During these years she advocated complete parity between men and women, including contesting articles in the 1960 Civil Code that provided the husband with the right to choose the place of residence. However, she received little support and Fitawrari Zewde Otero, a parliamentarian at the time, recalled her saying, "I may be the only woman representative today and you can ignore my comments but there will be a time when more women are in parliament and this law will be in place".

She married her third husband, Major Aseffa Lemma, who served as Ethiopian consul in Aden. While she visited him, she did not move to Aden. When he was appointed ambassador to West Germany in 1969 she was also appointed educational attaché, a post she held for around two years.

=== Civic life ===
Senedu Gebru was active throughout her life in a number of organisations, including The Ethiopian Women’s Welfare Association, the Ethiopian Red Cross, and the Armed Forces Wives Association.

=== Later life and death ===
Senedu returned to Ethiopia in the years leading up to the 1974 revolution while her husband sought exile in Germany. The revolution ended her political career. She lived in Addis Ababa and continued to write, including as a regular contributor to the 'women's column' in the Amharic newspaper Addis Zemen. She also gave nine playscripts to the Institute of Ethiopian Studies at Addis Ababa University. In 2005 the University awarded her an honorary doctorate in recognition of her contribution 'as an early champion of the emancipation of Ethiopian women'. Her son, Samuel Assefa, was serving as ambassador to the United States at the time of her death of 20 April 2009.

== Bibliography ==
- የግርማዊት እቴጌ መነን ትምህርት ቤት የምግብ አሠራር መጽሓፍ [The Empress Menan School Cook Book]. Addis Ababa: Berhanena Salem, 1945
- Ye Libbie Metsihaf [Book of my heart]. Addis Ababa: Berhanena Salem, 1950.
- Ye Itegie Menen Timihirt Bet Achir Tarik 1924-1949 [Short history of Empress Menen School 1932-1957]. Addis Ababa: Artistic Printing, 1957.
- Ye Tagayoch Simmet Ke Graziani Negegir Behuwala [The Feelings of Fighters after Graziani' s Speech]. 1948. Mimeographed.
- Ye Etiopia Tigil [The Struggle of Ethiopia]. 1949. Mimeographed.
- Adwa [The Battle of Adwa]. Mimeographed.
- Atse Tewodros [Emperor Tewodros]. Mimeographed, 1951.
- "Girls' Education". Ethiopian Observer. Vol. 1 No. 2., 1957
