= Gebru Desta =

Counsellor, interpreter, and former mayor (1855–1950)

Gebru Desta (Note: In various sources spelled as Gebru Desta, Gabru Dasta) also known as Kantiba Gebru and Aleqa Gebru Desta (1855 – January 1950) was an Amhara intellectual, and former mayor of Gondar and Addis Abeba. Gebru was one of the few foreign-educated Ethiopians during Menelik II’s reign, and served the emperor and his successors in various positions ranging from diplomat and interpreter. He was a political prisoner during Ethiopia's occupation by Fascist Italy.

== Early life ==
Born to a Amhara peasant family in Alefa district of Begemder. His family later moved to Dembiya, where they lived until famine induced by conflict and drought plagued the area and brought misfortune. Gebru's father, (Ato (Note: Ato is a honorific for men, its female counterpart is Woyzero) Desta) was unable to support his family, and entrusted his son to a relative named Webu, who was a major in Emperor Tewodros's army. Gebru described this period later in his writings as the ‘‘years of trouble.’’ He left his relative following a quarrel, and wandered away with no particular destatination in mind. On the road to Debre Tabor, he accidentally came across a group of people travelling to Emperor Tewodros II court to receive assistance in provisions. (Note: It was said that Tewodros II occasionally shared his wealth with the poor.) Gebru joined the group and lined up at the court to receive his share. Ato Joseph Bell, a younger brother of Susan Bell, (Note: Susan Bell was the daughter of Liqe Mekwas John Bell and Woyzero Warqnash Yelma, daughter of Dejazmach Yelma of Begemder.Susan was the wife of Theophilus Waldmeier, then a trusted advisor of Emperor Tewodros II.) was very sympathetic to the youth. Gebru was pulled from the line and introduced to Theophilus Waldmeier, a Swiss missionary employed by Emperor Tewodros II as craftsman. (Note: Theophilus Waldmeier along with other missionaries (such as Moritz Hall) worked as craftsman at a arms foundry established by Emperor Tewodros II in Gafat, a busy village northeast of Debre Tabor.)

=== Education ===
Gebru got his first exposure to Western education in a mission school run by foreigners. Waldmeier gave Gebru shelter, and taught him how to read and write, and in turn Gebru educated other children. (Note: J. Mayer, a German missionary, also educated Gebru.) He travelled with Waldmeier (and by extension with Tewodros II; the missionaries followed wherever the emperor went). Gebru accompanied Emperor Tewodros II to his final stronghold, Magdala, where the emperor committed suicide in April 1868 as troops led by the British commander General Robert Napier stormed his fortress. (Note: As someone who saw that visionary emperor at close range, Gebru harbored an abiding admiration for Tewodros's idealism.) In the aftermath of the British expedition, Gebru (aged 12) and the missionaries was taken out of the country by the British troops.

He was subsequently patronized by Samuel Gobat; an influential missionary of the Church Mission Society (CMS). Gobat enrolled Gebru, and other Ethiopians in a mission school at Jerusalem. After a period of adaptation and overcoming his cultural bias towards handicraft, Gebru successfully adjusted to the new environment. He (among selected students) moved to St. Chrischona (another CMS outpost) near Basel, in 1872. (Note: Gebru noted in his autobiography that he met a few Ethiopians students at the institution in St. Chrischona, but many of them died of illness.) Gebru graduated in 1876 with a diploma in theology.

Unable to return to Ethiopia after he finished his studies because of the Ethio-Egyptian hostilities, Gebru went to Württemberg to assist Dr. Johann Ludwig Krapf in the translation and revision of the Amharic bible. About two years later, Martin Flad (Note: Johann Martin Flad was a German missionary who worked to convert the Beta Israel in Ethiopia. He is also author of Scriptures translated into Amharic.) and his colleagues, suggested that Gebru could return to Ethiopia and do missionary work among the Beta Israel. During the many years he spent abroad, Gebru became a Protestant convert and learned German, French, English and Arabic languages.

== Career ==
=== Return to Ethiopia ===
In 1879 Gebru sailed to Massawa with Engeda-Esat. (Note: Engeda-Esat was his fellow countrymen and friend, they knew each other from their time at St. Chrischona. Engeda-Esat was of mixed Ethiopian and German parentage, his father was Georg Wilhelm Schimper, a botanist, who lived in Ethiopia since 1837. Engeda-Esat studied languages, medicine and engineering in Europe. He first served the Italians in Eritrea and then, after 1905, Emperor Menelik II.) They journeyed on foot from the coast to Azazo via Hamasien, Seraye and Adwa.

He was appointed to the Senate of Ethiopia in 1931, and again after the Italian occupation in 1941.
