= Wolde Giyorgis Wolde Yohannes =

Ethiopian politician (1900–1976)

- ወልደ ጊዮርጊስ ወልደ ዮሐንስ

Minister of Justice
- In office 1949–1955
- Monarch: Haile Selassie I
- Preceded by: Masfin Andargatchew Massai
- Succeeded by: Abiye Abebe

Personal details
- Born: 1901 Shewa, Ethiopian Empire
- Died: 29 July 1976 (aged 74–75) United Kingdom
- Resting place: Kensal Green Cemetery
- Education: Menelik II School

Wolde Giyorgis Wolde Yohannes (Ge'ez: ወልደ ጊዮርጊስ ወልደ ዮሐንስ; 1901 – 29 July 1976) was an Ethiopian government official and Minister during the reign of Haile Selassie. Between 1941 and his downfall in 1955, he came to dominate Ethiopian politics for a decade and a half, not only serving as Tsehafi Taezaz or Minister of the Pen (1941–1955), but at times Minister of the Interior (1943–1949), and Minister of Justice (1949–1955).

== Life ==
Wolde Giyorgis was born in Shewa, and received his education at the Menelik II School. According to John Spencer, he was the son of a saddle-maker and received "little formal education". Spencer considered him his friend, confessing that from "our first encounter at the headquarters at Dessie, I was drawn to him by his lively use of French and his swift ironic wit. Throughout the 12 years of our collaboration, he and I, even in the midst of serious discussion in committee meetings, continued to indulge in ironic by-play."

He became Emperor Haile Selassie's private secretary prior to the Italian occupation, and accompanied his monarch into exile. When Emperor Haile Selassie returned to Ethiopia Wolde Giyorgis was at his side, having gained the Emperor's trust during their exile, as well as according to Bahru Zewde a "knack for political intregue", Bereket Habte Selassie writes that "he was responsible (next to the Emperor—some say next to no one) for the post-restoration establishment of a firm control over the capital and the provinces. He enjoyed immense power (or the confidence of the Emperor, which is the same thing) and, to many people, exemplified the older educated generation who were the Emperor's willing and efficient tools in his pursuit of the policy of complete centralization of power."

Wolde Giyorgis was much involved in negotiating the Anglo-Ethiopian agreements of 1942 and 1944. He strongly opposed post-war British pressures on Ethiopia, most notably against British efforts to remain in occupation of the Ogaden and the so-called Reserved Area adjacent to British Somaliland. As a result, Richard Pankhurst notes, "several British officials went so far (incorrectly) as describing him as being 'anti-British'. For his part he used to say that he was not 'Anti-anybody, but pro-Ethiopian'. I emphasise this side of his life because it is highly relevant to our subject for today!"

However, in 1955 Wolde Giyorgis fell from favor, and a group of four ambitious ministers moved into his place: Makonnen Habte-Wold, Ras Abebe Aregai, Ras Andargachew Masai, and General Mulugeta Bulli. As Christopher Clapham observed, "Not least of among the emperor's achievements was the way in which he caused the resentment both of the nobility and of frustrated reformers to be directed against Wolde Giyorgis rather than himself, thus remaining detached from policies for which he was essentially responsible."

After his downfall, Wolde Giyorgis served as Governor of Arsi (1955–1960), and of Gamu-Gofa (1960–1961). He left Ethiopia for medical treatment, just before the Ethiopian revolution of 1974, becoming an exile in Britain where he died two years later. Wolde Giyorgis was buried in Kensal Green Cemetery.
