= Yoftahe Negussie =

Ethiopian writer, playwriter and poet (1894–1947)

- ዮፍታሄ ኑጉሴ
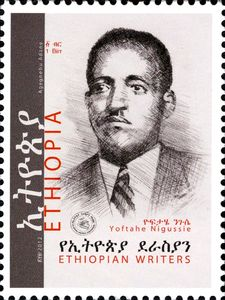
- Yoftahie at Ethiopian Writers 2nd series cover
- Born: 21 April 1894; Muzaelias, Gojjam Province, Ethiopian Empire
- Died: 8 June 1947 (aged 53); Addis Ababa, Ethiopian Empire
- Resting place: Balewold Church, Addis Ababa
- Occupations: Writer; playwriter; poet
- Writing career
- Language: Amharic; Ge'ez
- Years active: 1924–1947
- Period: Modern literalism
- Notable works: Teqem Yalebel; Chewata; Meseker

Yoftahe Negussie Weldeyesus (Amharic: ዮፍታሄ ኑጉሴ ወልደየሱስ; 21 April 1894 – 8 June 1947) was an Ethiopian writer, playwright and poet widely known for contributing to the Ethiopian literature in 20th century, akin to the Ethiopian Orthodox Church and the Imperial government.

He has composed dramas like Teqem Yalebel, Chewata, Meseker, Yehod Amilaku, Qetat, Yamare Melash, Musherit Mushera and Yehezb Tsetset. He was Deputy President of the Judiciary Council of the Ethiopian Parliament from 1943 to 1947.

== Biography ==
Yoftahe Negussie was born on 21 April 1894 in Muzaelias, Gojjam Province from his mother, Mazengia Woldeher and his father Nigussie Weldyesus. His father was a church administrator. As a child, he learned traditional church music, zema and Ge'ez to which he entitled as Kegnegeta. At the age of 14, he moved to Addis Ababa where he ordinated at Abo Church in 1924. At Teferi Mekonnen and Menelik II School respectively, he has worked with Amharic and music teacher. The teaching profession prompted him to write several songs, theatrical pieces and poems for use in and beyond the schools.

From 1931 to 1934, he wrote many dramas including Teqem Yalebel, Chewata, Meseker, Yehod Amilaku, Qetat, Yamare Melash, Musherit Mushera, Yehezb Tsetset and many others. From playwriting, Misikir, Musho Bekentu, Alem Atalay, Eyayu Mazen, Arbete Tsehay, and Negusu ena Zewdu. Critics stated that his play amused Emperor Haile Selassie with Ethiopian culture, history and the church.

After the Italian invasion of Ethiopia, Yoftahie wrote well known poet Eyayu Mazen, Welad Itiyopiya and Atentun Lelkemew. From 1943 to 1947, he had served as Deputy President of the Judiciary Council of the Ethiopian Parliament. On 8 June 1947, Yoftahie died in Addis Ababa and buried in Balewold Church in Addis Ababa.
