= Workneh Eshete =

Ethiopian physician and politician (1864–1952)

Workneh Eshete or Azaj Warqnah Ishete, also known as Charles Martin (21 October 1864 – 8 October 1952) was an Ethiopian physician, statesman, administrator, diplomat, author, architect, and a major progressive force in modern Ethiopian history. He played a significant role in influencing twentieth century medicine, education, diplomacy and economic development in Ethiopia He led a diplomatic mission to the United States in 1927, which negotiated a contract to build a dam on the upper Abay River; and, beginning in 1934, he served as Ethiopia's minister to the United Kingdom.

== Early life ==
Workneh was born in Gondar, the son of Negadras Eshete Woldemariam. Nagadras Eshete had been forced to join Emperor Tewodros II in his retreat to Magdala, where the emperor made his final stand against the invading British soldiers in 1868. In the confusion that followed the capture of Magdala, Workneh was separated from his parents and found by the British soldiers alongside Alemayehu Tewodros, weeping over the Emperor's body. Assuming he was an orphan, Workneh was taken under the protection of Colonel Charles Chamberlain. According to Bahru Zewde, Colonel Chamberlain took him to Aden where he was made the ward of another colonel, Charles Martin, who brought to India, where Workneh attended the mission schools at Rawalpindi and Amritsar. Richard Pankhurst, however, presents another version of events in Workeneh's life after leaving Ethiopia: Colonel Chamberlain brought Workneh to his home in Rawalpindi, serving as his guardian until his death in 1871, after which Workneh was dispatched to the mission school at Amritsar where Colonel Martin paid for his education. In both versions of the story, Workneh was grateful enough to Colonel Martin's interest in him that he took the Colonel's surname as his own; similarly he adopted the given name of Colonel Chamberlain and thus took the name "Charles Martin".

The younger Martin enrolled at the Lahore Medical College in 1877; upon his graduation in 1882 under the name of Charles Martin, he performed two years of practice as an assistant surgeon, then travelled to Scotland where he undertook further specialized training and received certificates in medicine and surgery. Upon completion of these studies, in December 1891 he was appointed medical officer and surgeon in Burma.

== Return to Ethiopia ==
When Doctor Charles Martin heard of the Italian invasion of his homeland in 1896, he obtained three-month's leave and attempted to return to Ethiopia. He was stopped at Zeila, then part of British Somaliland, by J.L. Harrington the British district officer, who told him that on account of the war he could not proceed, and in any case it would take six weeks to reach Addis Ababa. While Dr. Martin was forced to return to his posting in Burma, his effort was not wasted: Harrington subsequently informed Emperor Menelik about the young Ethiopian doctor. Emperor Menelik was very interested to meet his compatriot and asked Harrington to arrange this. In 1898 Dr. Martin received a letter from Harrington inviting him to Ethiopia.

According to Bahru Zewde, basing his opinion on the events Workneh recorded in his yet unpublished diary, Dr. Martin arrived in Ethiopia in late 1899, having his first audience with Emperor Menelik on 5 January 1900. But it in March of that year that he had the most important meeting of his first visit to Ethiopia.

He had pitched a tent in the center of Addis Ababa, where he began to treat patients free of charge. While occupied at this undertaking, as Pankhurst tells the story, "He was soon surprised to see an old lady accompanied by attendants, going back and forth in front of his tent and regarding him with obvious attention." The doctor, who had long forgotten the few words of Amharic he knew as a child and was forced to rely on an interpreter to talk to his fellow countrymen, sent the man to ask the lady what she wanted.

She replied that she wished to examine his arms and legs, as she believed him to be her grandson who had been lost at Magdala as a child. He cordially invited her to examine him, but stipulated that she must first tell him what she expected to find. She replied, "a long scar on the left arm and another on the right leg".

Upon finding the scars, his grandmother then told him the story of his origin. His mother had died of grief a few days after he had been taken away, and his father lived not much longer. His relatives all presented themselves to him, "his aunt apologizing for having deserted him in panic over thirty years earlier".

Although Pankhurst describes this reunion as "most romantic", Dr. Martin's own immediate response was remarkably distant. Bahru Zewde notes that "his diary gives a distinctly chilly impression of his return to his motherland and reunion with his relatives. He viewed the exuberance and excitement of his kin with clinical detachment, expressing scepticism about the identities of his maternal grandmother, Emahoy Salamnesh, his aunt and his half-sister". Bahru explains much of his response was due to "the culture shock that he must have gone through", and notes that either he must have confined his aloofness to his diary, or it did not bother his relatives who were "earnestly trying to find a bride for him".

Menelik asked the doctor to remain in Ethiopia and use his skills to benefit his fellow Ethiopians. Workneh and Menelik argued over the salary: the doctor wanted 5,000 Maria Theresa thalers a year, while Menelik would only offer 2,000. Menelik did convince the doctor to stay for the lesser sum, promising a raise at the end of the first year. Workneh found the year frustrating, for his efforts to open schools in Ethiopia were opposed so fiercely by the Ethiopian Church that no progress was made. The French and Russian diplomats, jealous of his closeness to the Emperor, claimed that he was a British spy.

When he found that the raise he had expected did not materialize, to the fury of Empress Taytu Betul, the doctor refused to make his services available any longer and left Addis Ababa on 9 March 1901. On his journey to the coast, he met Ras Makonnen Wolde Mikael, then governor of Harar, with whom Workneh formed a more amiable relationship. During his stay in Harar, Dr. Martin served with a British expedition sent in 1901 against the Somali resistance leader, Mohammed Abdullah Hassan. Afterwards the doctor served as Ras Makonnen's personal physician for six months, for which service he was given gult over 70 acres in Jarso. He finally left Ethiopia for Burma 2 February 1902, taking with him five Ethiopian boys to be educated abroad; one of them, Tedla Abebiyeu, later became a medical doctor.

== Second visit to Ethiopia ==
Hakim Workneh returned to Ethiopia towards the end of 1908, serving as the medical officer to the British legation at Addis Ababa. Upon his return, he found the elderly emperor in poor health, and "attended to by competing doctors who reflected the rival interests of their legations". Following the dismissal of the German physician, Dr. Zintgraff, who had been accused of attempting to poison the Emperor, Hakim Workneh became Menelik's attending physician at the request of the monarch August 1909, and remained in his service until a year before Menelik's death in 1913.

It was during this period that Hakim Workneh married Qatsala Tulu, the daughter of a Shewan aristocrat and attendant to the future Empress Zewditu. Her father had been reluctant to allow his daughter to marry a foreigner -- "as Workneh was for all intents and purposes presumed to be", Bahru Zewde points out—but he was persuaded in the end to consent to the union. They left together for Burma around 1913, where Qatsala studied nursing and taught her husband Amharic and Oromo. Together they had six sons and seven daughters, adding to the son, named Tewodros, Workneh had by a woman he had married while studying in Scotland. Bahru Zewde states they had a happy marriage, until the 1930s when rumors of his infidelity led to their separation. His children would marry into Ethiopia's influential families who were either members of the Solomonic Dynasty or high government officials who were highly respected both internationally and domestically. The Sorbonne educated diplomat, governor and a descendant of the Shoan branch of the dynasty Lij Seifu Mikael married his daughter Sarah Workneh and H.E. Yilma Deressa, London School of Economics graduate, Finance and Foreign affairs minister and a diplomat married another Workneh daughter Elizabeth Workneh.

== Returning to Ethiopia ==
After serving 28 years service with the British government, Workneh returned to Ethiopia in 1919 and offered his services to the government. Despite being the only Ethiopian with a complete medical education, he served his homeland in other ways. Although he was in charge of building the Addis Ababa - Jimma road until the responsibility was transferred to a group headed by David Hall, Workeneh's primary contributions were in the area of education and government. His first post, following his return, was as medical director of Menelik II Hospital. When the Tafari Makonnen School was opened in 1925, he was appointed superintendent. During his tenure, with the help of Heruy Welde Sellase, he wrote a book on world geography in Amharic. The collaboration, Bahru Zewde opines, "seems to have been mutually beneficial, as Heruy also managed to improve his English as he worked with Workneh on the book. He was an important activist for the abolition of slavery in Ethiopia, founding a school for freed slaves that would teach them literacy and other skills which included weaving, tailoring, and carpentry. In July 1926 Workneh published a moving article in the weekly newspaper Berhanena Selam, in which he argued abolishing slavery "represented the culmination of a course of events initiated by Menilek."

Hakim Workneh served several government posts. On 1 July 1928, he was given the traditional Ethiopian title of Azaz and appointed president of the Special Court which handled cases involving Ethiopians and resident foreigners. In 1930, he was appointed governor of the model province of Chercher, a duty he discharged for four years. Although few details are known of how he administered Chercher, an article in the Berhana Selam compliments him for opening a school in Chercher and building roads. He achieved these improvements despite the sometime capricious instructions sent to him from Addis Ababa. In 1933 he was ordered to release seven persons he had detained on charges of keeping slaves; another instruction he received commanded the immediate transfer of 23,808 birr to the capital, "which was the amount of the revenue of the Ministry of Commerce".

He simultaneously discharged diplomatic duties. In 1927 Hakim Workneh led an official delegation to the United States to negotiate with a New York company, J.G. White Engineering, to build a barrage on Lake Tana; Ras Tafari (later Emperor Haile Selassie) had selected this company in response to the Anglo-Italian agreement two years earlier, which had placed Lake Tana in the British sphere of influence. This visit was significant not only for Workeneh's meeting with the company, and officials of the United States which included President Coolidge, but for arriving in Harlem, where he delivered Ras Tafari's greetings to the African-American community and Tafari's invitation to skilled African Americans to settle in Ethiopia. Then, prior to becoming governor of Chercher, Dr. Workneh journeyed to India in 1930, where he recruited 16 professionals, including two teachers, to come to Ethiopia and assist in its modernization.

Then in the wake of the Ual-Ual Incident, Workneh was made Ethiopian minister to the United Kingdom, "a post for which he was eminently qualified" Bahru Zewde observes. Faced with the lack of interest from the British government over Ethiopia's situation—the British authorities were in the large, supporters of Italy—he found valuable support in Sylvia Pankhurst, who proved to be a tireless activist on behalf of Ethiopia. He contributed regularly to Pankhurst's weekly New Times and Ethiopia News, and their combined efforts built up a grass-roots movement of support for Ethiopia within Great Britain. Despite these efforts, the United Kingdom offered little support for Ethiopia in the Second Italo-Abyssinian War, which ended with Emperor Haile Selassie being forced into exile.

== Last years ==
With the arrival of Emperor Haile Selassie in England, their relationship became strained. Bahru Zewde states, on the authority of Emmanuel Abraham and Dr. Ammanuel Gebre Selassie, that part of their disagreement arose over finances; Haile Selassie was broke, and Workeneh, also in desperate need of funds, sold the Ethiopian legation building—which he had bought with his own money in the first place.

Events inside Ethiopia brought personal tragedy to Workeneh's life: the unsuccessful attempt on Marshal Rodolfo Graziani's life led to reprisals which included the summary execution of Workeneh's sons, Benyam and Yosef. Other members of his family, including his estranged wife Qatsala, his first son Tewodros, and his daughters and in-laws, were interned and deported to Italy. Workneh turned his attention to obtaining the release of his imprisoned family, and his and their resettlement in India. Despite his efforts, he could only take four of his children with him to India, where he remained until 1941/2. Returning to Ethiopia, he dedicated the rest of his life to educating his grandchildren and the children of his relatives and neighbors at his house on the eastern outskirts of Addis Ababa.
