= Heruy Wolde Selassie =

Ethiopian writer and diplomat (1878–1938)

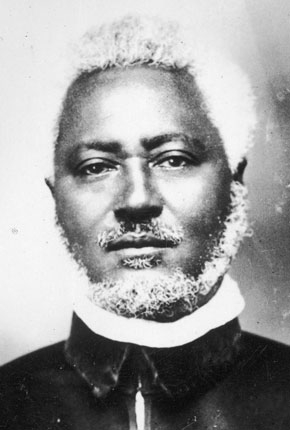

Minister of Foreign Affairs
- In office 1930–1936
- Monarch: Haile Selassie I
- Preceded by: Ras Tafari Makonnen
- Succeeded by: Lorenzo Taezaz

Personal details
- Born: 8 May 1878 Merhabete, Shewa, Ethiopian Empire
- Died: 19 September 1938 (aged 60) Fairfield House, Bath, England
- Occupation: Diplomat; writer

Blatten Geta Heruy Wolde Selassie (Ge'ez: ብላቴን ጌታ ኅሩይ ወልደ ሥላሴ Blatten-Geta Həruy Wäldä-səllase; 8 May 1878 – 19 September 1938) was an Ethiopian diplomat who was Foreign Minister of Ethiopia from 1930 to 1936 and a writer in Amharic. Bahru Zewde observes that his career "stands out as the great success story ... of the early twentieth-century intellectuals," then continues, "His prolific literary record, his influence with Tafari-Hayla-Sellase and his ascent in the bureaucratic hierarchy were all characterized by an unchequered progression. Edward Ullendorff concurs in this evaluation, describing his oeuvre as "a considerable and distinguished literary output."

John Spencer, who met Heruy in early 1936, described him as "a short, rotund, white-haired man ... with a goatee and a café au lait complexion. His corpulent build and backward-leaning stance suggested a Santa Claus, except for his black cape and the absence of a sparkle in his eyes. He was remarkably ponderous and deliberate (qunin), in his movements, perhaps reflecting the importance which he assigned to his position as foreign minister and to the reputation which he had earned among Ethiopians for his writings on Ethiopian history."

== Career ==
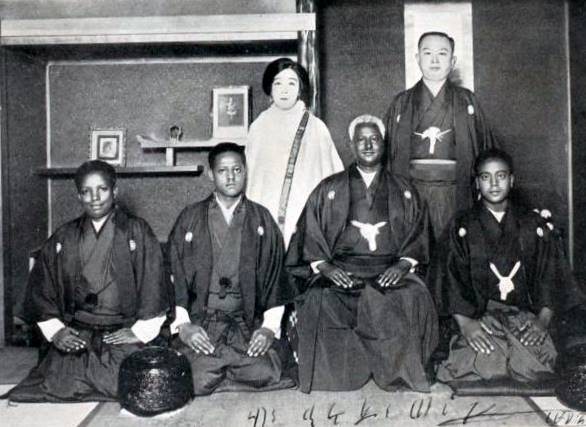
Heruy Wolde Selassie in Imperial Japan (1931)

Born Gebre Masqal in the region of Merhabete, Heruy received his initial education in the traditional manner at local churches until his father died when he was 13. He found a living working as deacon to a big landlord in return for food and clothing until he achieved an appointment as clerk to Dejazmach Bashah Abboye, the governor of Selale. Continuing in other clerical positions, he eventually came to the notice of the priests of Saint Raguel on Mount Entoto, who rekindled his desire for learning. He joined the school attached to that church, where he was taught by the Ethiopian Orthodox priest Mamher Walda Giyorgis. According to Bahru Zewde, it was Walda Giyorgis who gave him his name "Heruy" (Amharic "precious"). Not satisfied with a traditional education, Heruy cast his eyes further afield and learned English at the Swedish mission school in Addis Ababa then picked up some French working with a French veterinary team. Regent Ras Tefari (later Emperor Haile Selassie) appointed Heruy in 1916 to serve as administrator of Addis Ababa. He was a member of Ethiopia's first delegation to the League of Nations (7 August 1922) and part of the retinue that accompanied the Regent on his tour of Europe in 1924. By the early 1930s, he was promoted to Foreign Minister, and held that office at the beginning of the Second Italo-Ethiopian War.

A diplomatic mission to Japan in 1931 left him sufficiently impressed to argue for strengthened ties between the two nations. He hoped that, by modeling their military training and modernization on Japan, they could remain independent. This hope proved illusory and the pro-Ethiopian aspect of the Japanese military fully accepted alliance with Italy soon after the war with that country began.

Heruy joined his Emperor in exile, although he had been one of three members of the council who had voted against Haile Selassie leaving Ethiopia to address the League of Nations in Geneva. Heruy died at Fairfield House, and was buried in the city of Bath where the Royal Household lived in exile at Fairfield House, before his body was eventually returned to Ethiopia. Haile Selassie, who described Heruy in his autobiography as "brilliant and strong-willed", included the following words in his elegy at Heruy's funeral:

My colleague and friend Herui, as you depart after successful completion of your service to your country, if I fail to say 'you are great', your works would give the lie to my words. Although the storm generated by wicked people destabilized the world and buffeted you, it did not defeat you. Yet you had to obey the rule of the Great and Kind Lord. We are all subject to this eventually.

== Intellectual importance ==
Selassie was known for his support for, and informal association with, the broader and loose 'Young Japanisers'. The grouping refers to an Ethiopian school of thought that arose in the early Twentieth Century which compared Ethiopia to Japan, and favored modernization that was similar to the Meiji Restoration; other intellectuals included Heruy's friend Tekle Hawariat Tekle Mariyam and Gäbre-Heywät Baykädañ. More than most, Heruy saw similarities between Japan and Ethiopia. These included that both had longstanding imperial lines, both had had "roving capitals", and both had resisted the West. He believed that Ethiopia and Japan needed to be more aware of each other as they both resembled each other in his opinion. That being said he recognized Japan was the more prosperous of the two and had more successfully modernized. His 1932 work Mahdara berhan hagara Japan ["The Source of Light: The Country of Japan]" spelled out this philosophy.

Heruy's only novel, the first written and published since Afawarq Gabra Iyasus's Lebb Wallad Tarik, is Addis Aläm ("The New World"), published in 1932. As Jack Fellman explains, "The plot of the 80-page novel is basically simple, the narrative proceeds quickly and vividly with few complications, and the language is clear and concise. No foreign words are used." It recounts the life of one Awwaqa, who is born in Tegulet, which Heruy describes as a remote and backward village. He desires to be educated and succeeds in going to France by taking service with a visiting Frenchman. While in Paris Awwaqa studies languages and sciences, but after eight years feels homesick and returns to Tagulat. Once he returns, however he finds his family and friends cannot tolerate his new "revolutionary" foreign ideas. The novel continues expands the theme of the conflict between Awwaqa's modern European ideas and Ethiopia's more traditional ones. Addis Alam ends on an optimistic note, "perhaps as befitting a pioneering work" writes Fellman, with a compromise solution proposed by the Ethiopian Church meets and recognizes the benefits of the western world and the need to change at least some aspects of Ethiopia's traditional ways.

His son, Sirak Heruy, who was educated at Victoria College in Alexandria and Oxford University, translated Samuel Johnson's Rasselas into Amharic.

== Writings ==
Heruy Welde Sellase published 28 books, which include the following:

- Yä-həywät tarik (Biographie): bähʷala zämän läminäsu ləǧǧočč mastawäqiya [History of Life (Biography): A Guide for Future Generations] Addis Abeba: E.C. 1915 (= AD 1922/1923)
- Wädaǧe ləbbe [My Friend, my Heart]. Addis Abeba: Imprimerie Éthiopienne E.C. 1915.
- Goha Ṣäbah. Addis Abeba: Imprimerie du Gouvernement d'Éthiopie E.C. 1919
- Wāzémā: bamāgestu yaʼItyop̣yān nagastāt yatārik baʻāl lamākbar. E.C. 1921 (Reprinted E.C. 2001, Addis Ababa)
- Yä-ləbb assab : yä-bərhan-ənna yä-ṣəyon mogäsa gabəčča [Thought of the Heart: Majestic Marriage of Light and Zion]. Addis Abeba: Goha Ṣäbah E.C. 1923
- Addis Aläm [New World]. Addis Abeba: Goha Ṣäbah E.C. 1924 Eth.
- Mahdara berhan hagara Japan [The Source of Light: The Country of Japan]. Addis Ababa: Gobi Sebah Press, 1932. (Translated into Japanese by Oreste Vaccari as Dai Nihon [Great Japan], foreword by Baron Shidehara Kijuro. Tokyo, Eibunpo-Tsuron Shoji, 1933),
- Əne-nna wädaǧočče, mälk gəṭəm bä-səmaččäw [Me and my Friends, Poetry of Appearance through their Names]. Addis Abeba: Goha Ṣäbah E.C. 1927
