= List of Ethiopians =

This is a list of notable Ethiopians, sorted by the fields for which they are best known. The list includes people born in and residing in Ethiopia, as well as people strongly associated with Ethiopia, and people of significant Ethiopian ancestry.

== Academics and philosophers ==
- Alemayehu Fentaw Weldemariam, Constitutional law scholar and political theorist
- Mohamed Hikam Sheikh Abdirahman, Islamic scholar
- Dereje Agonafer, Professor of Mechanical Engineering at University of Texas at Arlington
- Amsalu Aklilu, lexicographer of Amharic
- Hizkias Assefa, professor of conflict studies and consulting mediator
- Bahrey, 16th-century monk historian
- Gäbre-Heywät Baykädañ (1886–1919), intellectual and reformer who served as treasurer for Emperor Menelik II
- Yosef Ben-Jochannan, writer and historian
- Eleni Gebre-Medhin, economist
- Gebisa Ejeta, 2009 World Food Prize laureate and Distinguished Professor at Purdue University
- Getatchew Haile, scholar of the Ge'ez language
- Walda Heywat, philosopher
- Ephraim Isaac, scholar of ancient languages
- Taddesse Tamrat, Ethiopian historian
- Shekh Muhammad Tānī, Islamic scholar
- Merid Wolde Aregay, Ethiopian historian
- Mesfin Woldemariam, academician
- Zewde Gebre-Sellassie, Ethiopian nobleman, historian, and former deputy Prime Minister of Ethiopia
- Edemariam Tsega, physician

== Artists ==
- Mickaël Bethe-Selassié, papier mâché sculptor
- Alexander Boghossian
- Kidist Hailu Degaffe
- Gebre Kristos Desta
- Wosene Worke Kosrof
- Tadesse Mamechae, sculptor
- Julie Mehretu
- Aida Muluneh, photographer
- Ale Felege Selam
- Afewerk Tekle
- Abel Tilahun, visual artist
- Alemtsehay Wedajo, multidisciplinary artist
- Elizabeth Habte Wold, mixed-media artist
- Zerihun Yetmgeta

== Athletes ==
- Gezahegne Abera, runner
- Haimro Alame (born 1990), Ethiopian-born Israeli runner
- Gashau Ayale (born 1996), Ethiopian-born Israeli marathon runner
- Bezunesh Bekele, runner
- Kenenisa Bekele (born 1982), long-distance runner
- Almensh Belete (born 1989, Addis Ababa), Ethiopian-born Belgian female long-distance runner
- Abebe Bikila (1932–1973), long-distance runner
- Worku Bikila (born 1968), long-distance runner
- Meseret Defar
- Baruch Dego (born 1982), Ethiopian-born Israeli footballer
- Ejegayehu Dibaba
- Genzebe Dibaba
- Tirunesh Dibaba
- Ageze Guadie (born 1989), Ethiopian-born Israeli Olympic marathon runner
- Haile Gebrselassie
- Letesenbet Gidey, 5000 meters world record holder
- Sifan Hassan, Ethiopian-born Dutch middle- and long-distance runner
- Youssouf Hersi, footballer
- Benjamin Kibebe, footballer
- Werknesh Kidane
- Tesama Moogas, Ethiopian-born Israeli Olympic marathon runner
- Jamal Sadat, footballer
- Theodor Gebre Selassie, footballer
- Lencho Skibba
- Maru Teferi (born 1992), Ethiopian-born Israeli Olympic marathoner
- Ydnekatchew Tessema
- Derartu Tulu
- Asi Vassihon (born 1982), Ethiopian-Israeli footballer
- Mamo Wolde (1932–2002), long-distance runner
- Million Wolde
- Mengistu Worku, footballer
- Andargachew Yelak, footballer
- Miruts Yifter
- Zohar Zemiro (born 1977), Israeli marathon runner

== Businesspeople ==
- Mahlet Afework, fashion designer and entrepreneur
- Tewodros Ashenafi, CEO of SouthWest Energy
- Sophia Bekele, corporate executive and entrepreneur
- Betelhem Dessie (born 1999), tech entrepreneur
- Mohammed Hussein Al Amoudi (born 1946), Ethiopian-Saudi billionaire
- Juneidi Basha, business executive
- Melesse Temesgen (born 1964), businessman and researcher
- Mazengia Demma, businessman and investor
- Eleni Gebre-Medhin, entrepreneur and business woman
- Tewolde Gebremariam, business executive, former chief executive officer of Ethiopian Airlines
- Girma Wake, business executive and chairman of Ethiopian Airlines

== Diplomats and ambassadors ==
- Aida Girma-Melaku UNICEF Representative in Pakistan
- Tekeda Alemu (born 1951), representative to the United Nations
- Teketel Forsido, ambassador and former Minister of Agriculture
- Abdul Majid Hussein (1944–2004), representative to the United Nations
- Makonnen Kebret, diplomat and agricultural education specialist
- Atsede Kidanu, career diplomat
- Mateus, 16th-century ambassador to Portugal and Rome
- Andargachew Messai (1902–1981), diplomat and husband of Princess Tenagnework Haile Selassie
- Saga za Ab, 16th-century ambassador to Europe
- Lorenzo Taezaz, (1900–1947), diplomat and later Minister of Foreign Affairs
- Tayé-Brook Zerihoun (born 1942), Assistant Secretary-General for Political Affairs in the United Nations Department of Political Affairs

== Entertainers ==
- Senait Ashenafi, actor
- Mahder Assefa, actress
- Dege Feder, dancer
- Ilfenesh Hadera, actress
- Amleset Muchie, actress and filmmaker
- Tesfaye Sahlu (1920–2017), comedian and children's television host
- Alebachew Teka, actor and comedian

== Fashion models ==
- Gelila Bekele
- Liya Kebede
- Sara Nuru
- Berta Vázquez

== Filmmakers ==
- Adanech Admassu
- Haile Gerima
- Nnegest Likke
- Theodros Teshome

== Humanitarians ==
- Yohannes Gebregeorgis
- Abebech Gobena
- Lale Labuko
- Yetnebersh Nigussie
- Alemayehu Fentaw Weldemariam
- Mesfin Woldemariam

== Military personnel ==
- Haile Tilahun Gebremariam, former Ethiopian National Defense Force (ENDF) general, present Head of Mission of the United Nations Interim Security Force for Abyei (UNISFA)
- Lieutenant General Birhanu Jula Gelalcha, Force Commander of UNISFA from 2014 to 2016
- Major General Tesfay Gidey Hailemichael, Force Commander of UNISFA from 2017 to 2018
- Major General Halefom Ejigu Moges, acting Head of Mission of UNISFA from 2014 to 2015
- Major General Hassen Ebrahim Mussa, Force Commander of UNISFA from 2016 to 2017
- Lieutenant General Tadesse Werede Tesfay, commander of UNISFA from 2011 to 2013
- Major General Yohannes Gebremeskel Tesfamariam, commander of UNISFA from 2013 to 2014
- Major General Gebre Adhana Woldezgu, Force Commander of UNISFA since 2018

== Musicians ==
- Elias Melka, legendary music composer
- Kamuzu Kassa, legendary music composer
- Gildo Kassa, music composer and singer
- Aminé, American rapper of Ethiopian descent
- Mulugeta Abate, songwriter and composer
- Madingo Afework (1978–2022), singer
- Teddy Afro, singer
- Alemu Aga
- Mahmoud Ahmed, singer
- Eden Alene
- Mulatu Astatke, musician and father of "ethio-jazz"
- Aster Aweke, singer
- Abatte Barihun, jazz saxophonist and composer
- Aragaw Bedaso, traditional singer
- Eyasu Berhe, singer
- Girma Bèyènè
- Ali Birra, singer and composer
- Tamrat Desta, singer-songwriter
- Alemayehu Eshete, Ethio-jazz singer
- Rophnan, electronic musician and songwriter
- Tilahun Gessesse, singer
- Gigi, singer
- Thomas Gobena, bassist of the Gypsy punk band Gogol Bordello
- Hachalu Hundessa, Oromo singer-songwriter
- Kenna
- Getatchew Mekurya, jazz, saxophonist
- Munit Mesfin, singer-songwriter
- LoLa Monroe, rapper, model, actress
- Emilia Rydberg, partial Ethiopian descent, performs in English and Swedish
- Kuku Sebsebe
- Kiros Alemayehu, Tigrayan singer
- Tigist Shibabaw, singer, sister of Gigi
- Shantam Shubissa, composer, singer, and poet
- Walias Band
- Wayna
- The Weeknd
- Willy William
- Asnaketch Worku, singer and krar player
- Girma Yifrashewa, classical pianist and composer
- Dawit Yifru, keyboardist and music arranger

== Nobility ==
- Faisal bin Turki, Sultan of Muscat and Oman
- Menen Asfaw
- Taytu Betul
- Abram Petrovich Gannibal
- Girma Yohannis Iyasu
- Iyasu II
- Iyasu V
- Prince Makonnen
- Menelik II
- Amha Selassie
- Haile Selassie
- Zera Yacob Amha Selassie
- Princess Tenagnework
- Tewodros II
- Yohannes IV
- Zewditu I
- Alem Tsahai Iyasu
- Imru Haile Selassie
- Seifu Mikael
- Kassa Hailu

== Physicians ==
- Gebrehiwot Baykedagn
- Workneh Eshete (1864–1952), first Ethiopian to be educated as a medical doctor

== Political figures ==
- Fisseha Adugna
- Abiy Ahmed
- Aman Mikael Andom
- Andualem Aragie (born 1972), Vice President and Press Secretary for the Unity for Democracy and Justice (UDJP) party
- Fikre Selassie Wogderess
- Fitsum Assefa
- Lidetu Ayalew
- Tafari Benti
- Abdirahman Eid Daahir (born 1985)
- Bulcha Demeksa
- Hailemariam Desalegn
- Haile Fida
- Merera Gudina
- Tsehafi Taezaz Aklilu Habte-Wold
- Harka Haroyu
- Adem Ibrahim, former Minister of Health
- Tamirat Layne
- Negeri Lencho, Minister of Communications
- Endelkachew Makonnen
- Mengistu Haile Mariam
- Seyoum Mesfin
- Birtukan Mideksa
- Beyene Petros
- Mazi Melesa Pilip, Ethiopian-born American politician
- Jawar Mohammed
- Berhanu Nega
- Mulu Nega
- Arkebe Oqubay
- Haile Selassie
- Hailu Shawel
- Lia Tadesse
- Zinash Tayachew
- Tekle Hawariat Tekle Mariyam (1884–1977), contributing author to the 1931 Constitution of Ethiopia
- Tesfaye Gebre Kidan
- Roman Tesfaye
- Mulatu Teshome
- Samuel Urkato
- Asrat Woldeyes
- Girma Wolde-Giorgis
- Hailu Yimenu
- Meles Zenawi

== Religious people ==
- Abu Rumi, first to translate Bible into Amharic
- Aster Ganno, Oromo Bible translator, collector of folklore, and teacher
- Dawit Amanuel, Bible translator into Tigre
- Onesimos Nesib, Oromo Bible translator
- Tekle Haymanot, saint of Ethiopian Orthodox Church
- Tewolde-Medhin Gebre-Medhin, Bible translator into Tigre and Tigrinya
- Yonatan Aklilu, founder of the Addis Kidan Kahinat Church

== Saints ==
- Abuna Aregawi
- Ewostatewos
- Tekle Haymanot
- Iyasus Mo'a
- Gabra Manfas Qeddus
- Kristos Samra
- Abuna Theophilos
- Samuel of Dabra Wagag
- Walatta Petros
- Yared

== Scientists ==
- Zeresenay Alemseged, anthropologist
- Berhane Asfaw, anthropologist
- Gebisa Ejeta
- Sossina M. Haile
- Tewolde Berhan Gebre Egziabher
- Aklilu Lemma
- Legesse Wolde-Yohannes
- Melaku Worede
- Yohannes Haile-Selassie
- Segenet Kelemu

== Writers ==
- Haddis Alemayehu
- Bahrey
- Yemodish Bekele (born 1960), journalist and author
- Dhoodaan (1941–2013), Somali-Ethiopian poet
- Tsegaye Gebre-Medhin
- Baalu Girma, author of Oromay
- Abe Gubegna
- Sebhat Guèbrè-Egziabhér
- Getatchew Haile
- Alaqa Gebre Hanna, master of qene poetry
- Afawarq Gabra Iyasus
- Moges Kebede
- Kebede Michael
- Maaza Mengiste
- Dinaw Mengestu
- Eskinder Nega
- Heruy Welde Sellase
- Abiye Teklemariam
- Mammo Wudneh
- Bewketu Seyoum
- Sebhatleab Gebregziabher

== Other notable people ==
- Alemseged Assefa, banker
- Amsale Gualu, first female airline captain
- Marcus Samuelsson, chef
- Adeneko Svhat-Haimovitch, judge in Israel
- Eyerusalem Jiregna, photographer and photojournalist
- Ellene Mocria, first female radio and television presenter

== See also ==
- Ethiopian historiography
