= List of Oromo people =

This is a list of notable Oromo people.

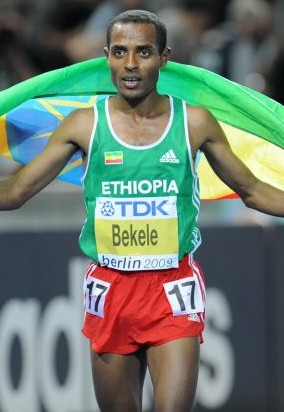
Oromo distance running champion Kenenisa Bekele.

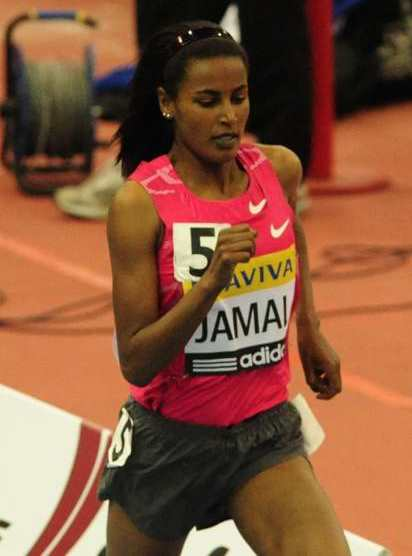
Oromo track and field athlete Maryam Yusuf Jamal.

== Artists and historians ==
- Ali Birra – Artist
- Baalu Girma – Artist
- Bakri Sapalo – Historian and Artist
- Boonaa Mohammed – Poetry
- Elias Melka – Songwriter and Producer
- Hachalu Hundessa – Singer-songwriter
- Lemma Guya – Painter
- Shantam Shubissa – Singer-songwriter
- Thomas Gobena – Musician
- Tsegaye Gabre-Medhin – Artist
- Mohammed Hassen - Historian
- Yadesa Bojia – Graphic Designer and Artist

Ligdii is a common Oromia given name.

== Athletes ==
- Abebe Bikila – Athlete
- Abebe Dinkesa
- Abebe Wakgira
- Abera Kuma
- Almaz Ayana – Athlete
- Asha Gigi
- Aselefech Mergia
- Atsede Bayisa
- Bekana Daba
- Belaynesh Oljira
- Bilisuma Shugi
- Bizunesh Urgesa
- Derartu Tulu – Athlete
- Deresse Mekonnen
- Deriba Merga
- Ejegayehu Dibaba
- Elfenesh Alemu
- Emebt Etea
- Fate Tola
- Fatuma Roba – Athlete
- Feyisa Lilesa – Athlete
- Firehiwot Tufa Dado
- Gelete Burka
- Genzebe Dibaba
- Gezahegne Abera
- Gudisa Shentema
- Guye Adola
- Ibrahim Jeilan –
- Imane Merga
- Kenenisa Bekele – Athlete
- Lelisa Desisa
- Lencho Skibba
- Mamo Wolde
- Mare Dibaba
- Meseret Hailu
- Meseret Mengistu
- Mestawet Tufa
- Metiku Megersa
- Maryam Yusuf Jamal
- Mohammed Aman
- Netsanet Gudeta
- Sifan Hassan – Athlete
- Sileshi Sihine –
- Tilahun Regassa
- Tariku Bekele
- Tamiru Demisse
- Tesfaye Tola
- Tesfaye Abera
- Tiki Gelana
- Tirunesh Dibaba – Athlete
- Worku Bikila (born 1968), long-distance runner
- Yacob Jarso
- Yomif Kejelcha –

== Footballers ==
- Adugna Deyas
- Abdusalam Abas Ibrahim
- Asrat Megersa Gobena
- Hayder Sherefa
- Mesud Mohammed
- Tokmac Nguen (Oromo Mother)

== Humanitarians and businesspersons ==
- Abebech Gobena – humanitarian
- Agitu Ideo Gudeta – Farmer, entrepreneur, environmentalist
- Girma Wake – business executive
- Juneidi Basha – businessman

== Military personnel ==
- Birhanu Jula Gelalcha
- Gobana Dacche
- HabteGiyorgis Dinagde Botera – Governor (disputed)
- Jagama Kello
- Kumsa Diriba
- Merid Negussie
- Mulugeta Buli
- G. Demise Bulto
- MG Kassaye Chemeda
- MG Merdassa Lelisa
- MG Abera Abebe
- Tadesse Birru
- Teferi Benti

== Politicians ==
- Ababiya Abajobir
- Abadula Gemeda
- Abdullahi Yousuf
- Abiy Ahmed Ali – Prime Minister of Ethiopia
- Adanech Abebe
- Addisu Arega Kitessa
- Alemayehu Atomsa
- Aster Mamo
- Awol Allo
- Bekele Gerba
- Birtukan Mideksa
- Birtukan Ayano Dadi
- Bulcha Demeksa
- Dawud Ibsa Ayana
- Demitu Hambisa Bonsa
- Diriba Kuma
- Fisseha Adugna
- Gebisa Ejeta
- Getachew Jigi Demeksa
- Girma Wolde-Giorgis – President of Ethiopia
- Haile Fida
- Jawar Mohammed – Activist and member of OFC
- Jaarraa Abbaa Gadaa
- Junedin Sado
- Kuma Demeksa
- Lemma Megersa – Ethiopian Minister of Defense
- Lencho Letta
- Martha Kuwee Kumsa
- Meaza Ashenafi
- Merera Gudina
- Mohammed Rashad Abdulle
- Muktar Kedir
- Mulatu Teshome – President of Ethiopia
- Negasso Gidada - President of Ethiopia
- Negeri Lencho
- Shimelis Abdisa
- Sinknesh Ejigu
- Solomon Areda Harvard Alumni, Judge of United Nations Dispute Tribunal and Deputy chief justice Federal Supreme Court of Ethiopia
- Tadesse Birru
- Takele Uma Banti
- Workneh Gebeyehu
- Yilma Deressa

== Nationalists ==
- Ahmad Taqi Sheikh Mohammed Rashid –
- Aster Ganno
- Baro Tumsa
- Elemo Qiltu –
- Haile Fida–
- Jaarraa Abbaa Gadaa –
- Kelbessa Negewo
- Tadesse Birru –
- Waqo Gutu –

== Other notable people ==
- Ilham Mohamed
- Jaarraa Abbaa Gadaa
- Abba Jifar II
- Haile Selassie (Oromo mother)
- Gebisa Ejeta
- Gudina Tumsa
- Machbuba
- Onesimos Nesib
- Pauline Fatme
