= Deya =

Deya may refer to:

- Deya (lamp), or diya, a type of lamp often used during Diwali
- Deya (station), a rural locality in Preobrazhensky Selsoviet, Zavitinsky District, Amur Oblast, Russia
- Avdey, a Russian male given name with the diminutive form Deya
- Gilbert Deya, British evangelist and accused criminal extradited to Kenya

== See also ==
- Adugna Deyas (born 1983), Ethiopian association football player
- Deià, a village on the Spanish island of Majorca
