= List of Saint George SC players =

Saint George Sports Club is an Ethiopian professional association football club based in Addis Abeba, who currently play in the Ethiopian Premier League. They have played at their current home ground, Addis Abeba Stadium, since its opening in 1940.

Saint George's first set of players were selected from students attending to local Addis Abeba school, Teferi Mekonen and Kidus Giorgis (Saint George).

== Players ==
The first players to play for Saint George include:

- (Greece) / (Ethiopia) George Ducas
- (Ethiopia) Ayale Atnash
- (Ethiopia) Tadesse Gete
- (Ethiopia) Metasebia Tessema
- (Ethiopia) Tesfaye Abegas
- (Ethiopia) Kassa Wolde
- (Ethiopia) Kebede Gete
- (Ethiopia) Afework Gebremeskel
- (Ethiopia) Tesfaye Memeray
- (Ethiopia) Tadesse Tessema
- (Ethiopia) Beyene Woldemariam
- (Ethiopia) Yidnekatchew Tessema (1935-1958)

List of other Saint George players:

Saint George players
| Name | Nationality | Position | St. George Career |
|---|---|---|---|
| Abebaw Butako | Ethiopia | DF | 2005–2014 |
| Abubaker Sani | Ethiopia | | |
| Adane Girma | Ethiopia | FW | 2007–2018 |
| Alula Girma | Ethiopia | | |
| Aschalew Tamene | Ethiopia | DF | 2015–2021 |
| Dawa Hotessa | Ethiopia | DF | 2013–2016 |
| Degu Debebe | Ethiopia | DF | 2004–2018 |
| Denis Onyango | Uganda | GK | 2005–2006 |
| Emi Ndeyzim | Uganda | GK | |
| Fisseha Woldeamanuel | Ethiopia | | |
| Getaneh Kebede | Ethiopia | FW | 2018–2021 |
| Hannington Kalyesubula | Uganda | GK | 2006–2008 |
| Hayder Sherefa | Ethiopia | MF | 2019–2023 |
| Ismaïl Ouro-Agoro | Togo | FW | 2021–2023 |
| Minyahil Teshome | Ethiopia | MF | |
| Mengistu Worku | Ethiopia | FW | 1956–1972 |
| Mohammed "Turk" Ahmed | Ethiopia | FW | |
| Oumed Oukri | Ethiopia | FW | 2012–2014 |
| Robert Odongkara | Uganda | GK | 2011–2018 |
| Shimelis Bekele | Ethiopia | MF | 2011–2013 |
| Shewangizaw Agonafir | Ethiopia | | |
| Zerihun Shengeta | Ethiopia | | |
| Zerihun Tadele | Ethiopia | GK | |
