= Adugna =

Adugna is both a surname and a given name. Notable people with the name include:

- Fisseha Adugna (born 1955), Ethiopian diplomat
- Shimelis Adugna, Ethiopian diplomat
- Adugna Deyas (born 1983), Ethiopian footballer
