= Tewolde =

Tewolde may refer to:

- Tewolde Berhan Gebre Egziabher
- Tewolde Gebremariam
- Tewolde-Medhin Gebre-Medhin
