= Sebhat =

Given name

Sebhat may refer to:

- Sebhat Aregawi (died 1914), late 19th and early 20th century Ethiopian Ras
- Sebhat Gebre-Egziabher (1928–2012), Ethiopian writer
- Sebhat Ephrem (born 1951), Eritrean politician and currently the Eritrean Minister of Defense
