= Demeksa =

Demeksa is a surname. Notable people with the surname include:

- Bulcha Demeksa (1930–2025), Ethiopian politician and businessman
- Getachew Jigi Demeksa (born 1967), Ethiopian-Belgian scholar
- Kuma Demeksa (born 1958), Ethiopian politician
