= Yilma =

Yilma can be both a given name and a patronymic. Notable people with the name include:

== Given name ==
- Yilma Deressa, Ethiopian politician
- Yilma Habteyes, Ethiopian novelist and screenwriter
- Yilma Ketema (born 1945), Ethiopian football forward

== Patronymic ==
- Gobezayehu Getachew Yilma, Ethiopian Roman Catholic prelate
- Sophia Yilma, Ethiopian journalist and politician
- Yeshashework Yilma, daughter of Haile Selassie, former emperor of Ethiopia
