= Abebech =

Abebech is an Ethiopian feminine given name. Notable people with the name include:

- Abebech Afework (born 1990), Ethiopian long-distance runner
- Abebech Gobena (1935–2021), Ethiopian humanitarian
- Abebech Negussie (born 1983), Ethiopian middle-distance runner
