= Atsede =

Atsede is an Ethiopian feminine given name. Notable people with the given name include:

- Atsede Bayisa (born 1987), Ethiopian long-distance runner
- Atsede Habtamu (born 1987), Ethiopian long-distance runner
- Atsede Kidanu (fl. 2001–present), Ethiopian politician and diplomat

== See also ==
- Lori Atsedes (born 1964), American golfer
