= Yemodish Bekele =

Ethiopian activist

- Born: August 27, 1960; Addis Abeba, Ethiopia
- Died: August 29, 2025 (at the age of 65); Addis Abeba, Ethiopia
- Education: Cambridge Tutorial College
- Occupations: Author, crime journalist and TV personality
- Writing career
- Genres: Poetry, crime, fiction

Yemodish Bekele (1960 - 2025) was a published author of thirteen books, including poetry, short stories, and a novella, and was the first Ethiopian woman to publish her own collection of short stories. A crime journalist, Yemedish was also the first woman to become the head editor for Polis Ena Ermijaw (‘Police and Future Journeys’) the newspaper of the Federal Police in Ethiopia.

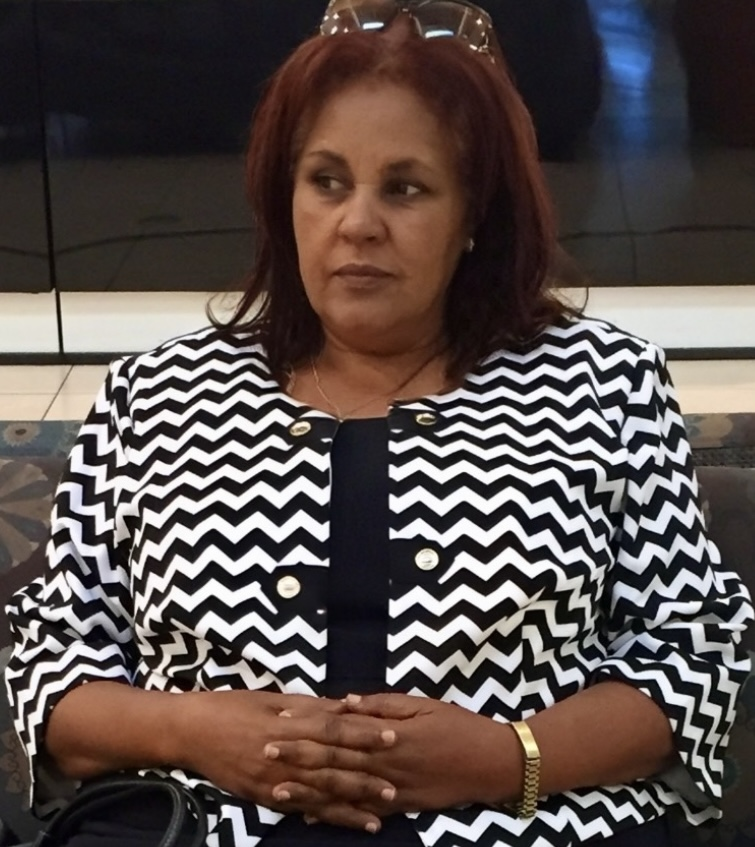
Yemodish Bekele

She was an activist for women’s rights and equality, using her television and radio platforms to amplify women’s voices and issues. She was the Founder and Executive Director of Women Can Do It and also served on the boards of several organizations committed to the advancement of women. She served as president of the Ethiopian Women Writers’ Association and as chair of the board of the Network of Ethiopian Women's Associations. She worked tirelessly to promote women’s empowerment and representation across all sectors of society.

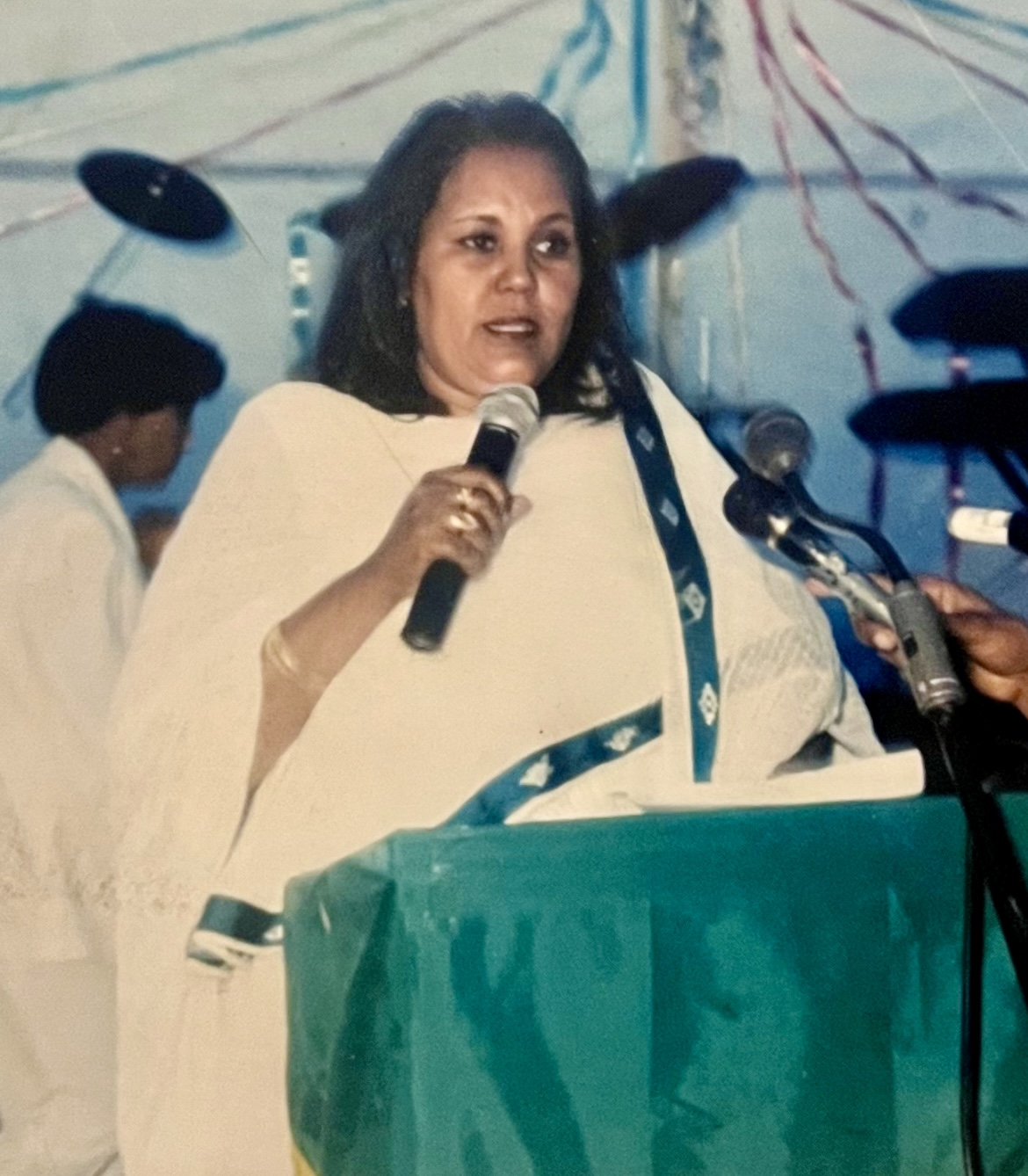
Yemodish Bekele is shown leading a meeting in the picture.

== Biography ==
Yemodish was born in 1960 in the Teklehaiymanot area of Addis Ababa, Ethiopia, where she attended the local primary school Africa Andinet, and attended secondary school in Addis Ketema. Yemodish was an only child, and as the daughter of a police officer she grew up reading police newspapers and publications.

In 1979, at the age of 19, she won a competition sponsored by the Ministry of Culture and Sports. This led to twelve of her poems being published in an illustrated collection entitled ‘Abyotawi Gitmoch’ (‘Revolutionary Poems’). One of the poems was entitled ‘‘ke maget eske ketema’ (From the home to the town) and was about the struggle of women.

In 1990, at the age of 27, she published her first book of short stories, titled ‘ ye bakene gize’ (‘Wasted Time’).

Yemedish worked for twenty-six years at Polis Ena Ermijaw the newspaper of the Federal Police in Ethiopia. She started as an intern, and worked her way up as a reporter and crime journalist, and then editor, and was the first woman to achieve status as the head editor.

Yemedish is known as a supporter of many poets in Ethiopia, and is involved in showcasing both her own work and the work of others at poem-a-thons in Addis Ababa.

Since retiring from Polis Ena Ermijaw, Yemodish writes and participates in organisations devoted to women's rights. She served as the Executive Directress of Women Can Do It, a President of the Ethiopian Women Writers’ Association and the chair of the board of the Network for Ethiopian Women's Associations.

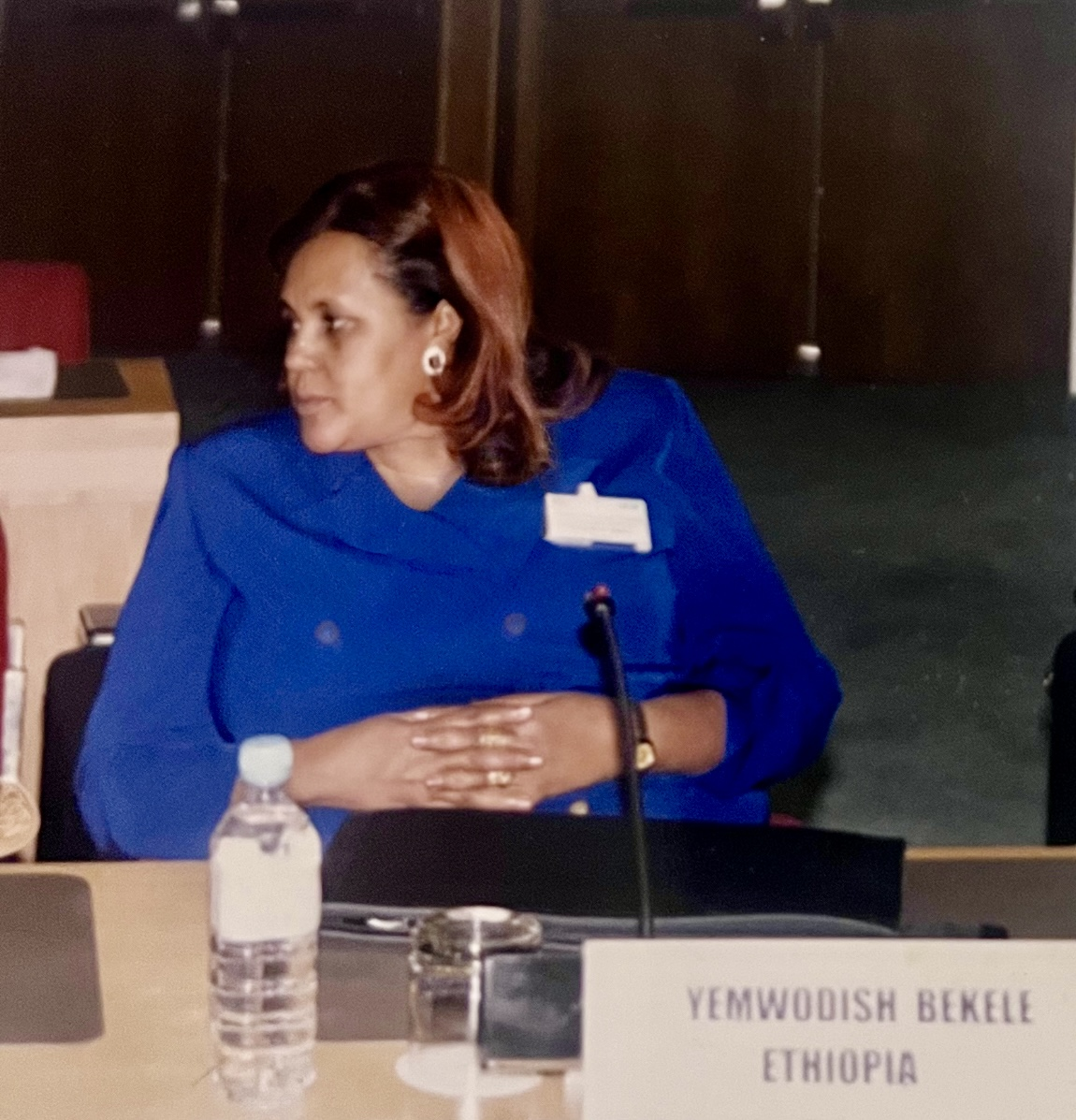
Yemodish Bekele is shown in the picture representing Ethiopia.

== Bibliography ==
- Abyotawi Gitmoch (‘Revolutionary Poems’) published in 1979 (12 poems in an illustrated collection)
- Ye Bakene Gize (‘Wasted Time’) published in 1990
- Yalfera fre (‘Fruit without fruit’) published in 1998
- Eta (‘Luck’) – a collection of short stories by nine women authors about women.
- Ebdwa Beletech (‘Mud is Better’) a novella
- Yaltenabebu Liboch (‘Unread Hearts’) a collection of short stories by nine women authors, which was published by Population Media Center as the winning selections in a competition among 42 women authors
- Fiker Yetamacho Nefsoch (‘Life Wants Love’) a crime novel
- Waginos (‘Healing Medicine’) a collection of poems
- Yewarda ser Gubae (‘Meeting under a Great Tree’) a collection of short stories by several authors
- Enya 2 (We 2) a collection of poems by several women
- Yenay Alem (‘My World’) a collection of true stories by several authors who won a competition
- Azurit (‘Turbulence’) a collection of true stories by several authors who won a competition sponsored by the Population Media Center (2012)
- Nawazhu Mehur (‘Educated but crazy’), a novel based on a true story (2012)
