= Alemayehu Fentaw =

Ethiopian lawmaker (born 1980)

Alemayehu Fentaw Weldemariam (born 8 June 1980) is an Ethiopian constitutional law scholar, political theorist, conflict analyst, and a public intellectual.

== Early life and education ==
Alemayehu Fentaw was born in Alamata, Tigray (formerly Wollo), Ethiopia on 8 June 1980. Alemayehu Weldemariam teaches Constitutional Law at Mekelle University School of Law where he is also Editor-in-Chief of the Law Review. He holds a Master of Science in Conflict Analysis & Resolution (2016) from George Mason University in Arlington, Virginia and a Master of Arts (summa cum laude) in Peace & Conflict Studies (2009) from the European University Center for Peace Studies at Stadtschlaining, Austria, where he was also a fellow of the Salzburg Global Seminar. Besides, he was a fellow of the Academy for International Business Officials, in Beijing, China. Moreover, he received an LL.B degree from Addis Ababa University School of Law in July 2005.

Alemayehu has also a year-long graduate training in philosophy at George Mason University in Fairfax, Virginia and spent another year reading the Great Books at the Graduate Institute at St. John's College in Annapolis, Maryland.

He moved to the United States in November 2011 as a guest scholar at the University of Chicago to collaborate with Professor Donald N. Levine on a book project on Ethiopia, published by Tsehay Publishers as Interpreting Ethiopia as well as an International Conference on George Simmel. He had delivered lectures at several universities in Ethiopia, the US and Japan, including, Villanova University, outside of Philadelphia, Pennsylvania, the University of California at Santa Barbara, and Doshisha University in Kyoto, Japan. He served as a scholar-in-residence at the Lyndon B. Johnson School of Public Affairs, University of Texas at Austin and Austin Community College. He was also a visiting professor of government in the College of Arts and Sciences at Suffolk University.

== Career ==
Weldemariam is a Lecturer-in-Law in the Constitutional and Public Law Program at Mekelle University where he teaches constitutional law, federalism, and human rights courses. He taught various courses at Jimma University Law School, including constitutional law, criminal law, jurisprudence, and law of traders and business organizations. He also served as the founding editor of the Jimma University Journal of Law and was head of the Research and Publications Office. Besides, he has served as project officer with the Organization for Social Justice in Ethiopia, legal advisor to the Ethiopian Chamber of Commerce, and regional director of the Ethiopian Global Initiative, political commentator at Ethiopia Insight, contributor to the Horn of Africa Bulletin, a monthly publication of the Life and Peace Institute, based in Uppsala, Sweden, editor-in-chief of Addis Fortune, and a consultant on regional and national peace and security. Weldemariam has researched and published extensively on Ethiopian law, politics, national security and foreign policy, as well as regional peace and security. Moreover, he sits on the international board of the US-based Ethiopian Global Initiative and the Kigali-based Great Lakes Peace Network Foundation and is also a member of the Paris-based Global Editors Network, as well as A New Science of Virtues, which is a project of the University of Chicago, and also is an associate of the Jethro Institute for Good Governance, a London-based consulting organization He currently serves as a peer reviewer for such prestigious journals as the Melbourne Journal of International Law and The Journal of Borderlands Studies.

== Scholarship ==
In his book, Legal Pluralism in Contemporary Ethiopia (2010), Weldemariam, following the tack taken by Professor Andreas Eshete (PhD, Yale), defends multinational federalism not under the eternal perspective of John Rawls’ political theory but under the unfavorable conditions aspect of his nonideal political theory. He contends that legal pluralism is an important federalist policy in a pluralist society such as Ethiopia. He does so by telling the story of the suppression of the diverse customary and religious laws in the country's recent past as part of the larger history of ethnic homogenization and state centralization. Since 1957, customary and religious laws had been alienated from the state legal system by virtue of the great influx of Western transplants providing the setting for competition between legal universalism and legal pluralism. In 1995, legal pluralism triumphs over legal universalism, as the 1995 FDRE Constitution recognizes the validity of customary and religious laws in personal and family matters. He analyzes the salient elements of legal pluralism in Ethiopia, argues for redrawing the frontiers of formal legal pluralism in such a manner as to include criminal matters, and points out the challenges. Professor Andreas Eshete described the work as one that "examined Ethiopia's new experiment in federalism with care and fresh insight" Professor Donald N. Levine of the University of Chicago gives his testimonial in the following words: "Alemayehu's work has prodded me to think afresh and offers facts, sources, and analyses from which I have learned a good deal. Indeed, regarding Ethiopia's regime of ethnic federalism, he has prodded me to change my mind somewhat. That is not a bad litmus test of any scholar." Professor Levine refers to him as "more of a social scientist-philosopher at heart than a lawyer, albeit an astute legal analyst."

In an interview with the Reporter (2008), the Amharic private bi-weekly, Weldemariam made an incisive analysis of Ethiopian politics and the role of political parties in the country as well as ethnic animosity in Ethiopian institutions of higher learning. Weldemariam's incisive analysis bears on the future of democratization in general and free and fair elections in particular in Ethiopia. Invoking Weldemariam's observation, Wondwosen Teshome (2009, 822)of the University of Vienna writes, “In fact, frustrated by the fragmentation of opposition parties and the refusal of many African incumbents to hand over power peacefully some political observers felt that unless the army stages a coup it is not possible to remove electoral autocrats democratically.”

His work as human rights activist figures in prominently in his advocacy for freedom of the press, worship, conscience, and association. He also advocated for release of Judge Birtukan Mideksa, leader of Unity for Democracy and Justice, the major opposition party in Ethiopia, against the rise of authoritarianism, and his critique of the Ethiopian national security and foreign policy in many of his writings. He was nominated for the Lorenzo Natali Prize for Excellence in Reporting on Human Rights for the year 2009 for his Ethiopia: On forgiveness, reconciliation, and pardon, an article published in Sudan Tribune.

Following the re-release of Judge Birtukan Mideksa from prison on 6 October 2010, he wrote a critical piece exposing the motive behind the decision and particular procedure selected for her release. He criticized the regime for harbouring an ill will to crush the morale of the judge not only by incarceration, but also by selecting procedures ill fitted for securing her freedom from prison like forcing her to confess and request for pardon as well as for being hell-bent on destroying her political career. In his The Unbearable Lightness of Pardon: Reflections on Birtukan's Second Sailing, he contends that both of her sailings out of prison proved to all the unbearable lightness of pardons in Ethiopia. In spite of the inhumane treatment Birtukan received in the hands of her jailors, one thing that is certain is that she will remain to be a source of inspiration for all who work the betterment of the human condition in Ethiopia.

In a series of articles, Weldemariam engaged in a constructive criticism of Ethiopia's national security and foreign policy in which he unmasked the incumbent's obsession with territorial security to the detriment of human security. More particularly, he criticizes Ethiopia for its military misadventures in Somalia in December 2006. He also prognosticated a possible cooling in the Ethiopian American relations as result of foreseeable diplomatic wrangles over the grim domestic human rights situation. His criticism never went without provoking an official response from the foreign policy establishment. A case in point is the publication of 'A Bogus Call for a Paradigm Shift-Ethiopia's Foreign Affairs and National Security Policy and Strategy', in A Week in the Horn, the e-weekly of The Ethiopian Ministry of Foreign Affairs. In the official response, the Foreign Ministry wrote "Alemayehu Fentaw does not just miss these central elements of the Policy and Strategy instrument. He concocts facts and makes unsubstantiated allegations. One is the suggestion that US-Ethiopia relations would cool under the new US administration. In fact, as is obvious, the relationship between the two countries is thriving."

== Publications ==
=== Books ===
- Legal Pluralism in Ethiopia: A Critical Introduction, Lambert Academic Publishing, Saarbrücken, Germany, 2010

=== Articles ===
- "Is the specter of the Arab Spring haunting Ethiopia?", Open Democracy, June 4, 2012,
- "Contributed to Donald N. Levine's "Ethiopia's nationhood reconsidered", Análise Social, vol. XLVI (199), 2011, 311-327,
- "The Unbearable Lightness of Pardon: Reflections on Birtukan's Second Sailing", October 10, 2010, Rasselas Review,
- "Ethiopia: On Forgiveness, Reconciliation, and Pardon", Sudan Tribune, April 10, 2009,
- "Ethiopia: The Authoritarian Executive, the Rubber-Stamp parliament, and Delegation of Powers", American Chronicle, October 26, 2008,
- "Ethiopia: Reflections on the Crusade against Real Estate", American Chronicle, December 16, 2010,
- "Anarchy, Terrorism, and Piracy in Somalia: Revisited", American Chronicle, December 16, 2010,
- "Ethiopia's Somalia Policy: A Very Brief Critique", The Rasselas Review, January 2011,
- "Legal Pluralism: Its Promises and Pitfalls for Ethiopia", Jimma University Journal of Law, Vol.1, No.1, October 2007,
- "Ethiopian Unfair Competition Law: A Critical Evaluation", Jimma University Journal of Law, Vol. I No.2, January 2008
- "Ethiopian Unfair Competition Law", The University of Oxford Center for Competition Law and Policy, CCLP Working Paper 21,
- "Some Observations on Ethiopian Unfair Competition Law", Ethiopian Journal of Legal Education, Vol. 1, No.2, April 2009
- "A Nascent Peace and Security Architecture in the Horn of Africa: Prospects and Challenges", Horn of Africa Bulletin, March, 2009, Uppsala Sweden,
- "The Emerging Peace and Security Architecture in the Horn of Africa: Prospects and Challenges", Transcend Media Service, Oslo,
- "A Critique of the National Security Policy: Towards “Human Security” in Ethiopia", Horn of Africa Bulletin, Vol. 21, No. 11, November 2009, Uppsala, Sweden,
- "Towards Inclusive Security in Ethiopia", Horn of Africa Bulletin, Vol 22, N0. 6, June–July 2010, Uppsala, Sweden,
- "The South Sudan Referendum: Domestic & Regional Security Implications", Horn of Africa Bulletin, Uppsala, Sweden, December 2010,
- "Reflections on the Crisis in the Sudan's Nuba Mountains of South Kordofan", Horn of Africa Bulletin, p. 5, March–April 2012,
- “Does Devaluation Make Sense in Ethiopia Now?” Editor's Note, Addis Fortune, Volume 10, Number 481, July 12, 2009,
- “His Holiness Should Renounce Assault Committed in His Name”, Editor's Note, Addis Fortune, Volume 10, Number 482, July 26, 2009,
- "The Ambiguous Legacy of Adwa as a National Symbol", Social Science Research Network, 24 Mar 2011,
- " Greater Ethiopia: The Evolution of a Pluralist Politico-Legal System in a Pluralist Polity", Social Science Research Network, August 15, 2011,
- "Ethiopia: Are the Islamists Coming?", Transcend Media Service, May 2012,
