= Yilma Habteyes =

Ethiopian crime novelist

- ይልማ ሀብተየስ
- Born: 1938; Addis Ababa
- Died: 2017
- Occupation: Writer

Yilma Habteyes (1938 – 2017) was an Ethiopian Amharic-language crime novelist and screenwriter.

Yilma Habteyes was born in 1938 in Addis Ababa. He was educated at the Lycée Guebre- Mariam before taking training courses to become a laboratory technician at the Pasteur Institute in Addis Ababa and the Public Health College in Gondar. In the 1960s he began working at the Ethiopian Nutrition Institute (ENI) , now part of the Ethiopian Public Health Institute (EPHI), interrupted by two years studying at the Medical Chemical Institute at Uppsala University in Sweden.

His first few books were about social problems he observed in Ethiopia. He self-published his first book, Yaltaddelech besew serg tedarech (“The Unlucky Girl Got Married at Someone Else’s Wedding") in 1962. His second book, Itzyyé ladirsh (“Can I Give You a Lift, My Sister”, 1963), was about rich men who pick up women in their cars and use them as sex partners. Its popularity encouraged him to keep writing. In Larbasimmint se’at tegabbu (“They Were Married for 48 Hours", 1964), a pregnant woman is abandoned at her wedding. Her family finds her another man to marry, but she gave birth on her wedding night.

His first crime novel was Issun teyyu (“Forget It!”. 1966), later rewritten as Sostennaw sew (“The Third Man"). Its protagonist is wrongly accused of killing his own father. His breakthrough novel was Käqäbǝr mäls (ከቀብር መልስ, "Return from the funeral", 1968). Afewerq Menna produced a multi-part television adaptation for Ethiopian Television (ETV) retitled Yaltäkäffälä ǝda (ያልተከፈለ እዳ, ‘Unpaid debt’, 1982) starring Alemtsehay Wedajo. It proved popular enough to have multiple re-airings. His next book was Sayǝnnaggär motä (ሳይናገር ሞተ, ‘Died without speaking’), about a pimp who finds the body of a dead woman under his bed. It was also adapted for ETV. In Dess yalew hazentenna (“The Happy Mourner,” 1972), a man steals 5000 birr and runs away with a married woman. He has his identical twin killed to facilitate their getaway.

The 1974 Ethiopian Revolution interrupted his writing career, but he was asked to write television screenplays. He adapted his story "Dem yenekkaw ij" (“The Blood-stained Hand"), aired in 1976, and his novel Issun teyyu as Qučč ̣bǝläw aymotumm (ቁጭ ብለው አይሞቱም, ‘Never die with indolence’), which aired on ETV. The Ethiopian Red Terror caused another hiatus of three years, but he emerged from it publishing a number of novels in quick succession. One of them, Lelaw ǝǧǧ (ሌላው እጅ, ‘The other hand’), he adapted for ETV. Another of his novels was adapted as YäʾAbeqäläš nuzzaze (የአቤቀለሽ ኑዛዜ, ‘Abaqelesh’s confession’), starring Wogayehu Nigatu as a patient in Amanuel Hospital, Addis Ababa's psychiatric institution.

== Bibliography ==
- Yaltaddelech besew serg tedarech (“The Unlucky Girl Got Married at Someone Else’s Wedding"), 1962.
- Itzyyé ladirsh (“Can I Give You a Lift, My Sister”), 1963.
- Larbasimmint se’at tegabbu (“They Were Married for 48 Hours"), 1964.
- Issun teyyu (“Forget It!”. 1966)
- Käqäbǝr mäls (ከቀብር መልስ, "Return from the funeral"), 1968, rewritten as Yaltäkäffälä ǝda (ያልተከፈለ እዳ, ‘Unpaid debt’), Ethiopia Book Centre, 1986.
- Sayǝnnaggär motä (ሳይናገር ሞተ, ‘Died without speaking’, 1970 or 1971)
- Dess yalew hazentenna (“The Happy Mourner,” 1972)
- Aggatami ("Chance"). Ethiopia Book Centre, 1986.
- Yabeqyellesh nuzazé (“The Confession of Abeqyellesh”). Ethiopia Book Centre, 1987.
- Lelaw ǝǧǧ (ሌላው እጅ, ‘The other hand’). Ethiopia Book Centre, 1987.
- Sostennaw sew, “The Third Man,” Ethiopia Book Centre, 1987.
- Dellalaw, “The Broker," 1987.
