= Tekle Haymanot (disambiguation) =

Tekle Haymanot or Takla Haymanot is the name of several famous Ethiopians:

- Tekle Haymanot I of Ethiopia, Emperor of Ethiopia
- Tekle Haymanot II of Ethiopia, Emperor of Ethiopia
- Tekle Haymanot of Gondar, pretender to the throne
- Tekle Haymanot of Gojjam, appointed King (Negus) of Gojjam and Kaffa by Emperor Yohannes IV

All the above are named after a medieval Ethiopian Saint:

- Tekle Haymanot (c. 1215 – c. 1313), Ethiopian monk

== See also ==
- Abuna Takla Haymanot, Ethiopian Patriarch from 1976 to 1988
- Mara Takla Haymanot, founder of the Zagwe dynasty
- Hailu Tekle Haymanot (1868–1950), Ethiopian noble and army commander
- Teklehaimanot (disambiguation)
