= Inga Hedberg =

Swedish botanist (1927–2024)

- Born: Inga Maria Margareta Holmbäck; 18 November 1927
- Died: 13 January 2024 (aged 96)
- Education: Uppsala University
- Spouse: Olov Hedberg
- Scientific career
- Fields: Botany
- Workplaces: Uppsala University
- Author abbrev. (botany): I.Hedberg

Inga Hedberg (18 November 1927 – 13 January 2024) was a Swedish botanist and academic. She was an expert on African alpine plants and was a leading member of the Ethiopian Flora Project that compiled an eight volume Flora, Flora of Ethiopia and Eritrea, which was published between 1989 and 2009.

== Early life and education ==
Hedberg was born in Luleå, Sweden on 18 November 1927 to Bure Holmbäck, a forester and industrialist, and his wife Ellen Holmbäck (née Lindeberg). She attended Uppsala University from 1950, studying for a fil.mag. degree before returning temporarily to teach biology at Luleå Secondary School.

== Career ==
Hedberg later returned to Uppsala to take a fil.dr. (Ph.D.) degree in genetics, having started studying it at the Swedish University of Agricultural Sciences. Her thesis topic, suggested by her husband Olov, was on the cytology of the genus Anthoxanthum. She successfully defended it in 1970.

After her children were born, Inga continued her doctoral studies and helped with Olov's research as well as caring for the family. Olov credited Inga with doing "a lion's share of the 'donkey work'" of annotation, typing, drawing illustrations and proofreading in his own Ph.D. thesis, and the couple frequently published papers together.

Hedberg studied African tropical alpine plants and their phytogeography and conservation. She was first listed as a member of Association for the Taxonomic Study of the Flora of Tropical Africa (AETFAT) in 1963, the year that her husband became the organisation's general secretary. Hedberg also taught and lectured at Uppsala University and founded the university's first ethnobotany course.

Hedberg named two species new to science: Anthoxanthum aethiopicum in 1976 and Colpodium drakensbergense (with her husband) in 1994.

=== Ethiopian Flora Project ===
Ethiopia was the only tropical African country to remain independent during the Scramble for Africa and the colonial era (except from Italian occupation from 1936 to 1941) meaning that no colonising country funded a flora project as they did elsewhere on the continent. The diversity and importance of Ethiopia's flora made a comprehensive overview necessary and the Ethiopian Flora Project was discussed at the seventh plenary of AETFAT in Munich. The project was a collaboration between Uppsala University and the University of Addis Ababa; Inga and Olov led the Swedish side and Tewolde Berhan Gebre Egziabher led the Ethiopian side.

The project was planned to take fifteen to twenty years but was not finished until 2009. (Note: Sebsebe Demissew credited this to contributors not providing their work on time and the death of Rodolfo Pichi-Sermolli in 2005. Pichi-Sermolli, who was working on the ferns section of the Flora, had been in ill-health for several years and died without submitting a draft manuscript.) Inga had edited every volume of the Flora, and also helped to organise the concluding conferences and publish the proceedings.

Reviews of the Flora were positive, noting the significant involvement of Ethiopian botanists, the use of Geʽez script for common names, and the new illustrations of Malvales species. A review in Kew Bulletin on the publication of volumes 2(2) and 7 said that the Flora was "in a class of its own among those currently in production."

== Personal life ==
Hedberg married Olov Hedberg in 1953 after they met as students at Uppsala University. They spent part of their honeymoon at the second plenary meeting of AETFAT at Oxford University. They had five children: Per, Bengt, Göran, Björn, and Maria.

Olov died in 2007 after being ill for several months. Inga was "deeply affected" by her experience of Olov's final weeks in hospital in Sweden; in 2017, she published a case study titled Så kan det vara: en fallstudie av svensk sjukvård, 'That is how it can be: a case study of Swedish health care', which outlined the problems of unsatisfactory communication between elderly patients and healthcare workers.
