= Muhammad Tānī =

Ethiopian Muslim cleric and scholar (1913/14–1989)

Haji Muhammad Tānī
- ሐጂ ሙሀመድ ሳኒ

Religious life
- Religion: Sunni Islam

Muhammad Tānī (1913/14 in South Wollo Zone – April 1989 in Addis Ababa) was an Ethiopian Muslim cleric, scholar, teacher and political leader.

After the Ethiopian Revolution, Tānī became a member of parliament and served as an advocate for the Muslim community in Ethiopia

== Biography ==
Tānī was born at Ančarro/Kärabitti in Qallu awrağğa, south Wällo administrative zone His father was al-Hāğğ Habīb, the son of Bašīr, a native of Wälqayet in Təgray, who migrated to Qallu “seeking knowledge” (talab al-‘ilm). Muhammad Tānī’s mother was Wäyzäro Fātuma Malik. When Tānī was four years old, his father went to Təgray and then to Asmära where he stayed for more than twenty years.

As an adult, Tānī married Kubrā bt. Sheikh Sa‘īd Mansūr of Wärrä Himäno. The couple had six sons: Muhammad Nūr, ‘Abd al-Rahmān, Husayn, Bašīr, Ahmad and Hasan, and two daughters, Maryam and Rahma.

== Islamic education and ministering ==
Tānī’s first Qur’ān teachers were Sheikh Muftī b. Ibrāhīm of Wärrä Babbo and Ahmad Mahallī of Alašša in Wärrä Himäno, . He studied the Qur’ān, fiqh (Islamic jurisprudence), tafsīr (exegesis), mantiq (logic), usūl (fundamentals [of jurisprudence]), hadīt and balāġa (rhetoric) under several ‘ulamā’. He also studied fiqh according to the Hanafī madhab, under al-Hāğğ Ahmad of Qallu, and nahw (Arabic grammar and syntax) and sarf (morphology) under Sheikh Kämmäläw b. Muhammad

At age 23, Tānī went to Asmära in search of his father and returned with him after a year.

After completing his religious education in 1937 (1944/45), Tānī’ taught for many years at mosques and Islamic schools in Dessie, Wällo and then in Massawa in Eritrea. The Arabic version of the account of his life partly confirms and partly contradicts some facts in the Amharic one as well as providing pieces of additional information in the latter:

== Journey to Mecca ==
In 1938-39 Tānī left for Mecca to perform the Hajj However, when he stopped at Harqiqo near Massawa, the Muslim elders of the town, offered him the position of imām of the Mīrġanī Mosque which he accepted. He served in Harqigo for several years.

Tānī finally made ti to Mecca and performed the hağğ. On his return to Wällo, Tānī studied ‘Ālā’ al-Dīn al-Haskafī's Durr al-Muhtār šarh tanwīr al-absār (a textbook of Hanafī fiqh) under al-Hāğğ Ahmad of Qallu. This was the second time for him to be tutored by him. On the completion of his studies, Tānī received an iğāza. Tānī then traveled to Albukko to pursue higher Islamic studies under Sheikh Ahmad Nure. He mastered six subjects: tafsīr, balāġa, mantiq, ‘arūd, tawhīd and usūl al-fiqh. Sheikh Ahmad also granted Tānī iğāza. From 1958/59 to 1974/75, Tānī taught a basic course on Islam to Muslim students at the Wäyzäro Sehin Comprehensive Secondary School in Dessie.

Tānī was then selected as one of the co-translators of the Qur'an by Emperor Haile Sellassie I. He moved to Addis Abba to start this work, From 1976/78 to 1978/79 he taught at the Däğğazmač ‘Umar Sämätär School at the Anwar Mosque and became deputy imām, He also privately taught hadīt, balāġa, tafsīr and mantiq to advanced students at his home.

== Political activities ==
After the outbreak of the Ethiopian Revolution, Tānī became the founding chairman of the Mağlis (Ethiopian Islamic Affairs Supreme Council), a member of the central committee of the national literacy campaign, the relief coordination committee and several other national committees.

Tānī led a Muslim delegation to an audience with, Lt. Colonel Aman Mika’él Andom, chairman of the Därg. On behalf of Ethiopian Muslims, he expressed support for the ongoing changes. On the first official celebration of ‘Eid al-Fitr, he reiterated such support and mentioned that previously a Muslim delegation would go to the Menelik Palace twice annually after the two ‘Īd prayers to express their good wishes to the emperor.

Tānī noted that after the revolution, they were allowed to celebrate the festival within the premises of the principal mosque in the presence of senior government officials. He also alluded to the fact that Ethiopian Muslims had long been prevented from taking part in national affairs and discriminated against in education, administration and the army. Finally, he called upon the government to grant land for the construction of a new mosque in the capital.

In the succeeding years Tānī was elected as a member of the national Šängo (parliament). He attended many international conferences (including one on world peace and disarmament/détente held the USSR), Saudi Arabia, Kuwait, Libya, Algeria and other countries. He also took part in an interreligious seminar organized by the government in 1978 at which he “...expressed appreciation of the fact that Islam had been placed on an equal footing with other religions in Ethiopia.” S

Tānī played facilitated the construction of mosques in and outside Addis Abäba, and the establishment and expansion of orphanages by personally endorsing applications for financial and material assistance submitted to him, and approaching Ethiopian Muslim and foreign philanthropists and organizations.

== Anwar Mosque ==
Tānī played an active role in transforming the Anwar Mosque from a venue for only formal ritual services into a centre of a vigorous, organized and vibrant social, intellectual and spiritual life and of theological and legal discourse based on consensus, tolerance and legitimacy of diversity and dissent, thereby setting a trend for, and impacting, the wider Muslim community in the country at large. orphanages by personally endorsing applications for financial and material assistance submitted to him, and approaching Ethiopian Muslim and foreign philanthropists and organizations.

== Publications ==
Besides co-translating the Qur’ān (with Sheikh Sayed Muhammad Sadiq), Tānī was the author of the first full-length Amharic language biography of Muhammad as well as a short introduction (in the form of questions and answers) to the rituals of the greater pilgrimage (hağğ) and the lesser pilgrimage (‘umra), the latter published posthumously.

He also contributed an article in Amharic entitled “Mälkam Ar’aya” to the Wäyzäro Sehin Secondary School magazine, Mäskäräm (1956 E.C.) on the importance of modern education.

== Death ==
Following a long illness, was admitted into the Black Lion hospital on 6 April 1989. He died at 2:15 p.m. on Friday 28 April 1989.

Tānī's funeral was attended by an estimated crowd of 300,000 people. It included including the patriarch, Abunä Märqoréwos, Täfärra Wändé, deputy prime minister and member of the central committee of the Workers Party of Ethiopia (WPE), and other senior Ethiopian government officials, leaders of other religious communities, ambassadors, representatives of international organizations, colleagues, friends and family members. He was buried at the Kolfe Muslim cemetery in Addis Abäba.

The author of Tānī's brief Arabic biography composed the following lines about the symbolic significance and actual impact of his life and death:

laqad māta tawd al-‘ilm wa’l-hilm wa’l-tuqā

wa azlama arğā’ al-nawāhī bifaqdihi wasālat dumu‘ al-ša‘b ka’l-ġayt al-hātil imām usiba al-qawm tarran bimawtihi liyabkīh masğid fī yawm wa fī’l-layl litabkīh jum‘at wahutbatuhu al-ahlā liyabkīh tafsīr bidam‘ihi al-hātil watabkīh ġurfat wamaktab mağlis walağnat da‘wat fī kulli al-asā’il

Indeed, died the mountain of knowledge, forbearance and devoutness His absence darkened all the directions of the horizon The tears of people poured down like heavy rain [He] was the imām by whose death people were much aggrieved Let the mosque weep day and night Let Friday and his sweet sermon weep Let the exegesis shed its tears Let the room and office of the Mağlis weep And the committee of the da‘wa in every place

He concluded: “wa ammā dakā’ihi wa ‘ilmihi fahuwa bahr qa‘ruhu ‘amīq.” (As for his intelligence, cleverness and knowledge, it is [like] a sea whose depth is profound.”)
