= Amsale Gualu =

Ethiopian pilot (born 1977)

- Born: November 30, 1977 (age 48); Bahir Dar, Amhara Region, Ethiopia
- Education: Assai School; Bole High School; Addis Ababa University (BA in Architecture)
- Occupation: Pilot
- Employer: Ethiopian Airlines
- Known for: First female captain in Ethiopia; First Ethiopian female captain of Boeing 767, 777, and 787; Second African female pilot to command a Boeing 787

Captain Amsale Gualu (born November 30, 1977) is an Ethiopian pilot. In 2010 she became the first female captain in the history of Ethiopia. She is also the first female captain on the Boeing 767, Boeing 777 and Boeing 787 in Ethiopia. Additionally Captain Amsale Gualu became the second African female pilot to command a Boeing 787.

== Biography ==
Amsale was born in 1977 in Bahir Dar, capital city of the Amhara Region. After moving to the capital city Addis Ababa she attended her primary school at Assai School and secondary school at Bole Highschool. She earned a BA from Addis Ababa University in Architecture.

On 2010 Amsale become the first Ethiopian female captain by flying an Ethiopian Airlines Bombardier Aerospace BombardierDHC-8-402Q400 from Addis Ababa to Gondar. Amsale graduated in 2002 from Ethiopian Airlines as the number six female pilot and worked for eight years before earning her captain title in 2010. In December 2017, Amsale captained the first Ethiopian Airlines international flight crewed entirely by women.

Captain Amsale Gualu has led an all-women functioned flights from Addis Ababa to Bangkok in the year 2015, to Kigali in 2016, to Lagos in 2017, to Buenos Aires in 2018 and, to Oslo in 2019 and to Washington DC in 2020.

== Marital Life ==
Captain Amsale Gualu is currently married and she is a mother of 3 children.
