= Tewodros Ashenafi =

Ethiopian entrepreneur (born 1969)

- ቴዎድሮስ አሸናፊ
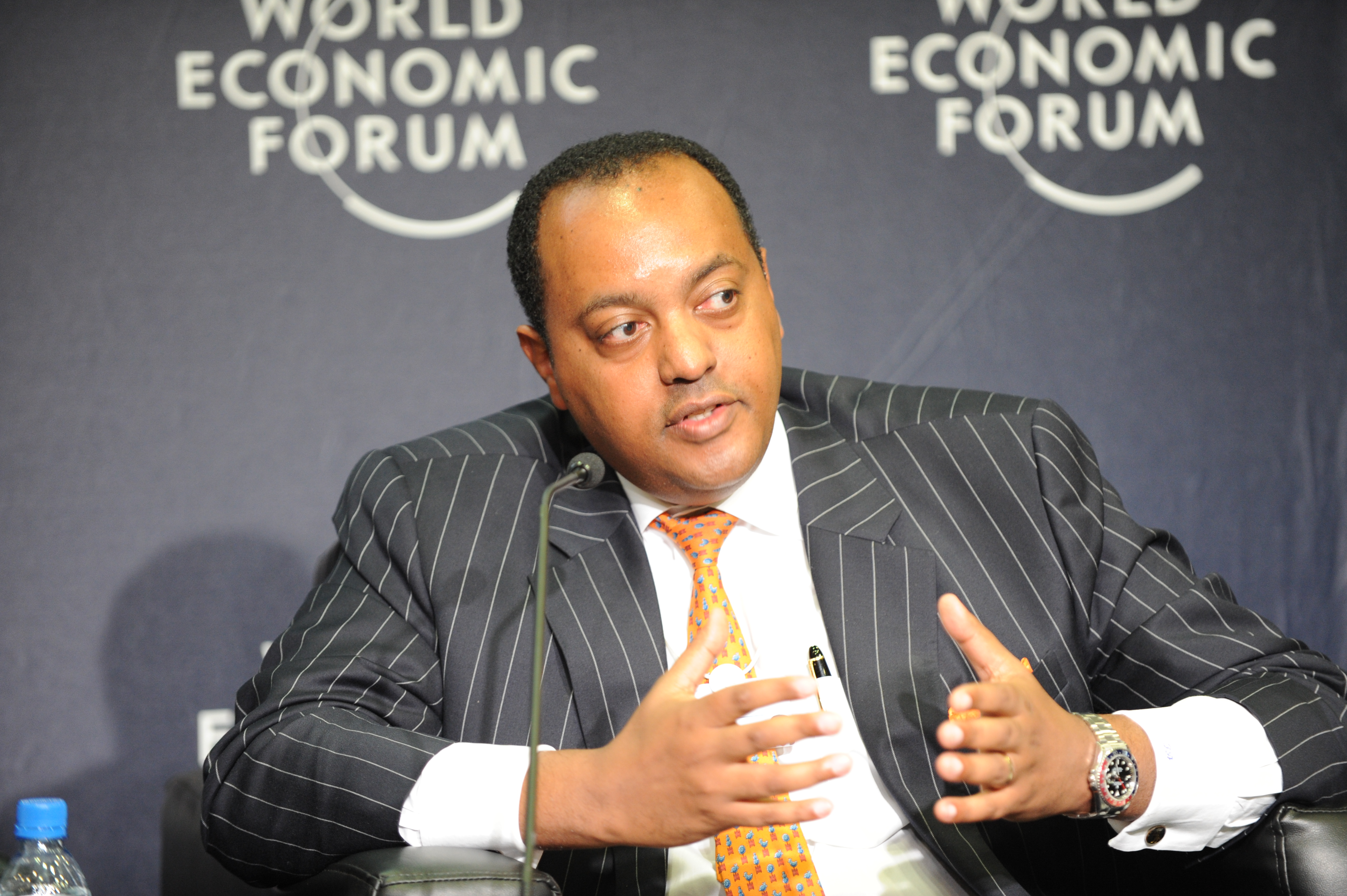
- Tewodros Ashenafi at World Economic Forum on Africa in 2010
- Born: 26 August 1969 (age 57)
- Education: Columbia College of Columbia University; Columbia University
- Occupation: Entrepreneur
- Years active: 1991–present
- Title: CEO of SouthWest Energy, SouthWest Development and Ambo Mineral Water

Tewodros Ashenafi (Amharic: ቴዎድሮስ አሸናፊ; born 26 August 1969) is an Ethiopian entrepreneur. He is CEO of SouthWest Energy.

== Education ==
Ashenafi holds a degree in Economics from Columbia College of Columbia University. He graduated from Columbia in 1991. Ashenafi attended the Owner Management Programme (OPM) at Harvard Business School.

== Career ==
Ashenafi is the chairman of SouthWest Energy, SouthWest Development and Ambo Mineral Water.

Ashenafi started his career at Merrill Lynch & Co in New York. Prior to founding SouthWest Energy in 2005, Ashenafi carried out international political and economic consulting work advising large international companies and pension funds about investment conditions in emerging markets, mainly in Latin America and the Commonwealth of Independent States.

In July 2016, Ashenafi played a major role in the privatization of Japan Tobacco International (with Ashenafi acting as the local partner) acquired 40% of Ethiopia’s National Tobacco Enterprise. The enterprise value of the deal was $1.4 billion, which is also one of largest private transactions in Africa.

In 2017, Forbes listed him as one of the richest men in Ethiopia.

== Board memberships ==
Ashenafi is on the board of directors of EastWest Institute, a New York-based security think tank. He also was on the International Advisory Board of the Atlantic Council, an organisation that promotes leadership and engagement in international affairs. He is a member of the Advisory Board for Columbia University’s Africa Centre.

Ashenafi is also on the advisory board of the Centre for International Relations and Sustainable Development, a public policy think-tank based in Belgrade and New York.

== Awards and affiliations ==
Ashenafi was nominated as a Young Global Leader (YGL) in 2009 by the World Economic Forum, which recognizes the 200 most distinguished young leaders under the age of 40. He is also a member of Initiative for Global Development’s Frontier 100.
