= Karl Olov Hedberg =

Swedish botanist

Prof. Karl Olov Hedberg (19 October 1923 – 24 September 2007) of Västerås was a botanist, taxonomist, author, professor of systematic botany at Uppsala University from 1970 to 1989, and an Editor of the Flora of Ethiopia.

== Career ==
Professor Hedberg was a pioneer in scientific knowledge on the afroalpine vegetation. Our present knowledge of this biosystem owes much to the research he and his wife Inga did on the Rwenzori and other high mountains in East Africa. His breakthrough views were based on their systematic fieldwork in the late 1940s. 'Features of Afroalpine Plant Ecology' remains a landmark in equatorial alpine ecological research up till today, and is still available in a facsimile re-edition of 1995.

In 1981, he was elected as a member of the Royal Swedish Academy of Sciences. He was recognised as a doctor jubilaris at the Linnean Doctoral Promotion at Uppsala University 2007. He was updating the Umbelliferae manuscript (prepared by Vernon Heywood, Stephen Jury and others) when he died in 2007.

== Herbaria ==
He was a member of the British Mycological Society. He was a contributor to the herbaria of the Natural History Museum (BM), the National Botanic Garden of Belgium (BR), National Museums of Kenya (East African Herbarium), National Herbarium (Ethiopia), Royal Botanic Gardens, Kew (K), Muséum National d'Histoire Naturelle (P) and the Swedish Museum of Natural History Department of Phanerogamic Botany (S). He was considered to be an important collector for the botany section of the Museum of Evolution at Uppsala University, Sweden having contributed to the phanerogamic part of the museum.

== Personal life ==
Professor Hedberg and his wife Inga (also a botanist) had five children: Per, Bengt, Göran, Björn and Maria.

== Taxonomic patronyms ==
In honor of K. O. Hedberg, several taxonomic patronyms were given in plants.

- Hedbergia
- Asystasia hedbergii
- Bryum hedbergii
- Calamagrostis hedbergii
- Colpodium hedbergii
- Crassula hedbergii
- Koenigia hedbergii
- Moquilea hedbergii
- Microcyba hedbergi
- Senecio hedbergii
