= Women Can Do It =

Norwegian training programme for women

Women Can Do It (WCDI) is a training programme for women originated in the Norwegian Labour Party Women.

The aim of women can do it is to encourage more women to participate actively in society. The programme is based on the belief that women make up half of the world's population and should therefore have equal opportunities to hold positions of power and authority as men. However, women are still underrepresented in decision-making positions in many parts of the world. They also receive less visibility in the media, hold fewer seats in parliament, occupy fewer leadership positions in political parties compared to men.

== The training ==
Women Can Do It is a training course for women; it aims at building confidence, learning the rules of political and organisational work and giving courage to the participants to speak out and taking part in decision-making processes.

"The quality of the seminars: In the seminars gender equality issues are presented in a simple way, and the skills taught are down-to-earth and practical. An overwhelming percentage of respondents in the survey as well as among the interviewees are very satisfied with the seminars. They report that the knowledge and skills gained in the seminars are useful in everyday life."

Arranging WCDI is one way of increasing women's participation. Encouraging women to participate in society, in NGOs, in political parties, speaking up at work or in the family, is important. Women's opinions are important and should be heard. Women often hold back from speaking their mind, worried that they will not be as eloquent as the men, will not be listened to, or they are afraid to be ridiculed or neglected at meetings.

"Every fourth Russian woman suffers from some kind of domestic violence and doesn’t get proper respect and confession in our society."

Women Can Do It is both training for specific organisational skills, but it is also an opportunity for women to meet and form networks. WCDI can be arranged independently of an organization for the general purpose of increasing women's participation in society, or it can be held within a party or organization for increasing the number of women within.

The programme has been conducted in more than 25 countries worldwide, and The Norwegian Labour Party arranges the training with the partnership of Norwegian People's Aid.

== Topics ==
The Training contents the following topics: Democracy and women's participation, Communication, Argumentation, speeches, debates, Working with the media, Negotiations – resolution of conflicts, Networking, Advocacy and campaigning, Violence against women How to arrange WCDI – Trainer skills

== See also ==
- Category:Women's rights by region
- Violence against women
