= Teketel Forsido =

Ethiopian politician and diplomat

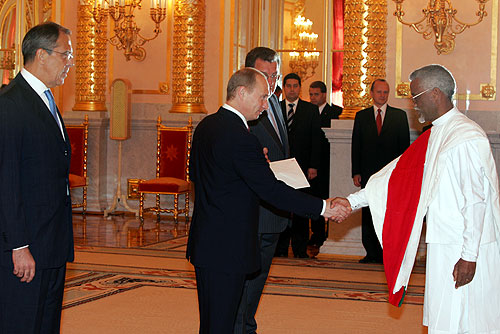
Teketel Forsido presents his Letters of Credence to Russian president Vladimir Putin on 25 July 2006.

Teketel Forsido is an Ethiopian politician and diplomat.

From 1995 to 1996 Teketel was the Ethiopian Minister of Agriculture. Teketel is a former Ethiopian ambassador to India, Yemen and Thailand.

Teketel was appointed as Ambassador of Ethiopia to Russia in 2006, and presented his Letters of Credence to Russian president Vladimir Putin on 25 July 2006.

Current serving as the president of Hope University College
