= Dawit Amanuel =

Dawit Amanuel (1862–1944) is noted in Ethiopian and Eritrean ecclesiastical history as being the main translator of the New Testament in the Tigre language, published in 1902. (By local custom, he is properly referred to as "Dawit".) In 1877, at about the same time as his father converted from the Ethiopian Orthodox Church to Islam, Dawit became the first evangelical believer from among the Mänsa people.

Dawit was educated at Gäläb at a school run by the Swedish Evangelical Mission. There, he worked on Scripture translation, for some years together with Tewolde-Medhin Gebre-Medhin. In addition to translating, Dawit began a Tigre dictionary and collected many Tigre songs and proverbs. Many of these were later published by the German scholar Enno Littmann. Dawit was also active serving the church as a pastor and evangelist and was ordained in 1925. Senait Wolde Mariam showed that Dawit was not given full credit for his contributions, some Swedes being given disproportionate credit.

== Cited references ==
- Arén, Gustav. 1978. Evangelical Pioneers in Ethiopia. Stockholm.
- Littmann, Enno. (1910–15). Publications of the Princeton expedition to Abyssinia, 4 vols. in 4, Leyden.
- Unseth, Peter. 2005. "Dawit Amanu’el," Encyclopaedia Aethiopica vol. 2, edited by Siegbert Uhlig, p. 114. Wiesbaden: Harrassowitz. online access
