= Deya (station) =

Deya Дея
- Station
- Location within Amur Oblast Location within Russia
- Coordinates: 50°02′N 129°33′E
- Country: Russia
- Region: Amur Oblast
- District: Zavitinsky District
- Time zone: UTC+9:00

Deya (Russian: Дея) is a rural locality (a station) in Preobrazhensky Selsoviet of Zavitinsky District, Amur Oblast, Russia. The population was 22 as of 2018.

== Geography ==
Deya is located 17 km southeast of Zavitinsk (the district's administrative centre) by road. Valuyevo is the nearest rural locality.
