= SouthWest Energy =

Ethiopian energy company

SouthWest Energy Ltd
- Type: Private
- Industry: Oil and gas
- Founded: 2005
- Headquarters: Ethiopia, Addis Ababa
- Key people: Tewodros Ashenafi, Chairman

SouthWest Energy Ltd is an Ethiopian oil and gas exploration and production company located in Addis Ababa, Ethiopia. The company was established in 2005 by Tewodros Ashenafi. It is registered in Hong Kong.

In December 2005, SouthWest Energy signed a production sharing agreement with the Ministry of Mines and Energy of Ethiopia for blocks 9 and 13 in the Ogaden Basin. In August 2008 it signed for block 9A, bringing the total acreage to 29,000 square kilometres (11,000 sq mi). The company plans to raise $100 million via a private placement in the first quarter of 2013 to help finance a three-well drilling program in the Ogaden Basin. In addition, the company owns acreages at the Gambella and Jijiga basins.

== See also ==
- Energy in Ethiopia
