= Andargachew Yelak =

Ethiopian footballer

Personal information
- Date of birth: 21 May 1997 (age 29)
- Place of birth: Ethiopia
- Position: Midfielder

Team information
- Current team: Saint-George SA

International career^{‡}
Years	Team	Apps	(Gls)
2014–	Ethiopia	3	(0)
- ‡ National team caps and goals as of 21 May 2017

Andargachew Yelak is an Ethiopian professional footballer who plays as a midfielder for Saint George SC.

== International career ==
In August 2014, coach Mariano Barreto, invited him to be a part of the Ethiopia squad for the 2015 Africa Cup of Nations qualification.
