= Saga za Ab =

Saga za Ab, often known in contemporary Europe as Sagazabo or Zaga Zabo, was an Ethiopian ambassador who visited Europe in 1527–33. Saga za Ab was sent to Portugal by the Ethiopian king Lebna Dengel in 1527. He accompanied a Portuguese mission to Ethiopia led by Francisco Álvares, which had been sent in 1520 by the king of Portugal following a 1507 request for help by Queen Eleni of Ethiopia against the Muslims in the Red Sea. The mission returned to Portugal in 1527. Saga za Ab was interrogated quite harshly by Iberian religious authorities Diogo Ortiz de Villegas and Pedro Margalho about what was perceived as Ethiopian "deviations" from the Christian faith, especially the Sabbath and circumcision, leading to accusations of Ethiopians being Judaeos and Mahometanos, but he courageously endeavoured to defend his creed.

Saga za Ab wrote an account of the situation of the Christian religion in Ethiopia, which was published by Damião de Góis under the title Fides, Religio Moresque Aethiopium in 1540:

"First, one must know that our Patriarch [Metropolitan] is chosen in a solemn rite by the vote of our monks in Jerusalem, who live there near the Holy Sepulcher of the Lord..."

— Introduction of Saga za Ab Fides, Religio Moresque Aethiopium in 1540

Other early Ethiopian embassies to Europe are known, such as the 1441 embassy of four Ethiopians to the Council of Florence, the 1481 embassy to Pope Sixtus IV by Antonio, the Ethiopian chaplain of the Emperor of Ethiopia, or the Portuguese chaplain Francisco Álvares, who was Ethiopian ambassador to Pope Clement VII in 1533. There was a large Ethiopian community in Rome from the 15th century, and Pope Sixtus IV granted them a church in 1476, renaming it Santo Stefani degli Abissini ("St Stephan of the Abyssins").

== Sources ==
- Kate Lowe Representing Africa: Ambassadors and Princes from Christian Africa to Renaissance Italy and Portugal 1402-1608 Transactions of the Royal Historic Society 2007
- Verena Böll, Steven Kaplan, Andreu Martinez D'Alos-Moner Ethiopia and the missions: historical and anthropological insights LIT Verlag Berlin-Hamburg-Münster, 2005 ISBN 3-8258-7792-2
