= Tewolde Berhan Gebre Egziabher =

Ethiopian scientist (1940–2023)

- ተወልደ ብርሃን ገብረእግዚአብሔር
- Born: 19 February 1940; Adwa, Tigray Governorate, Italian East Africa (now in Tigray Region, Ethiopia)
- Died: 20 March 2023 (aged 83)
- Education: Haile Selassie I University; University of North Wales
- Awards: Right Livelihood Award
- Scientific career
- Doctoral advisor: Prof. P. Greig Smith (Ph.D.)

Tewolde Berhan Gebre Egziabher (Tigrinya: ተወልደ ብርሃን ገብረእግዚአብሔር; 19 February 1940 – 20 March 2023) was an Ethiopian scientist who won the Right Livelihood Award in 2000 "for his exemplary work to safeguard biodiversity and the traditional rights of farmers and communities to their genetic resources."

== Biography ==
Tewolde was born in Adwa, a town in Tigray Region on 19 February 1940. He is the brother of renowned writer Sebhat Gebre-Egziabher. He attended Negeste Saba (Queen of Sheba) Elementary School in Adwa from October 1951 to June 1955. Tewolde was accepted to General Wingate Secondary School in Addis Ababa and studied there from September 1955 to July 1959. He was then accepted to Addis Ababa (then Haile Selassie I) University, Addis Ababa where he studied from September 1959 to July 1963 and won the Chancellor's gold medal for best graduate in the Faculty of Science. He studied at the School of Plant Biology, University of North Wales from October 1966–Nov. 1969 and was awarded a PhD under Prof. P. Greig Smith. Ph.D.

Tewolde worked in the Biology Department at Addis Ababa University from 1963, serving as a graduate assistant, assistant lecturer, and assistant professor. He was appointed dean of the Faculty of Science in 1974, and served in this capacity until 1978, when he was appointed associate professor of biology. In 1978 he also began working part time with the Ethiopian Science and Technology Commission as Leader of the IDRC-UNU sponsored research project "Research and Development in Rural Settings". From 1980 to 1996, he was project leader of the Ethiopian Flora Project, working with Olov and Inga Hedberg.

Tewolde was appointed president of Asmara University in 1983, and held this post until 1994. From March 1995 he has served as the General Manager of the Ethiopian Environmental Protection Authority.

During the 1990s, Tewolde put much of his energy into negotiations at the various biodiversity-related fora, especially the Convention on Biological Diversity (CBD) and the Food and Agriculture Organization. In this time he built up a strong group of well-prepared African negotiators who began to take the lead in the G77 and China Group. Africa came out with united, strong, progressive positions, such as no patents on living materials and the recognition of community rights. This strengthened the G77 and China's negotiating positions.

Tewolde was instrumental in securing recommendations from the Organisation of African Unity (OAU) encouraging African countries to develop and implement community rights, a common position on Trade-Related Aspects of Intellectual Property Rights, and a clear stance against patents on life. Tewolde also guided the drafting of the OAU model legislation for community rights, which is now used as the common basis for all African countries.

At the 1999 biosafety negotiations in Cartagena, Colombia, Tewolde was the spokesperson for the majority of the G77 countries, called 'the Like Minded Group'. These negotiations ended in deadlock, but reached a successful conclusion in Montreal in January 2000. Tewolde's leadership of the Like Minded Group in the negotiations played a key role in achieving an outcome against strong US and EU opposition - that protects biosafety and biodiversity and respects traditional and community rights in developing countries.

Tewolde was also named one of the 2006 winners of the United Nations top environmental prize, Champions of the Earth. He was also a member of the World Future Council.

Tewolde died on 20 March 2023, at the age of 83.

== Awards ==
- Right Livelihood Award (2000)
- Champions of the Earth (2006)
