= Adem Ibrahim =

Ethiopian Minister of Health

Adem Ibrahim is the former Ethiopian Minister of Health.
