= Yonatan Aklilu =

Ethiopian Pentecostal pastor (born 1985)

- ዮናታን አክሊሉ
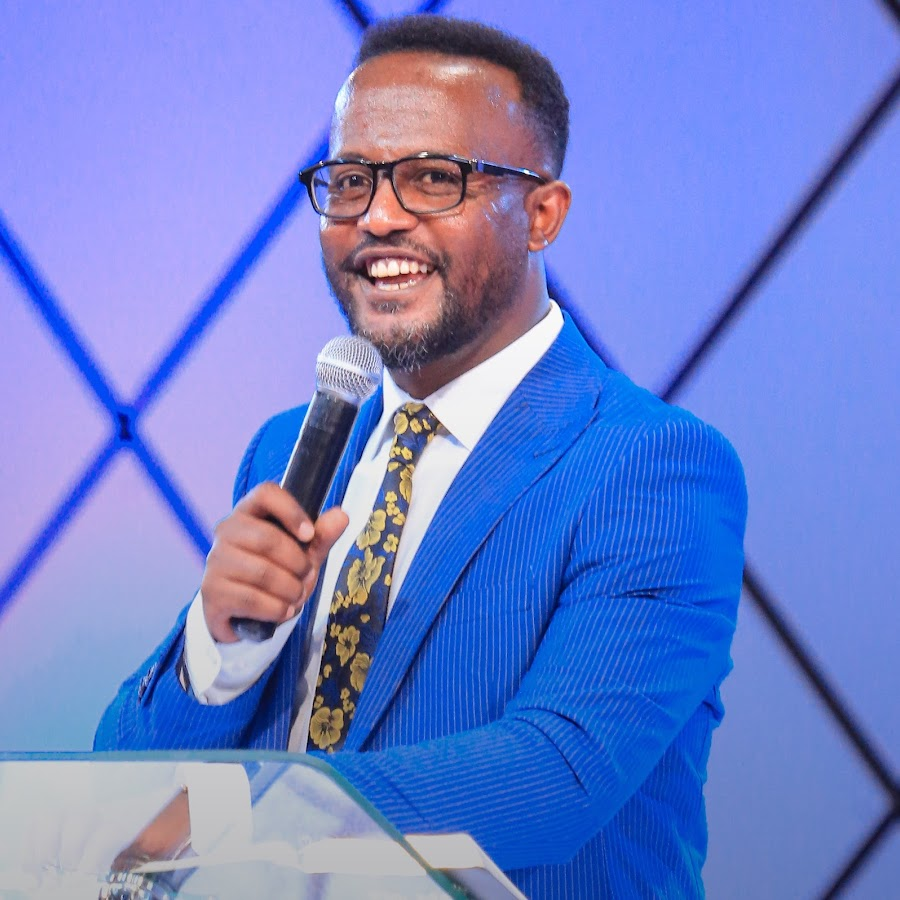
- Born: 15 June 1985 (age 41); Adola, Sidamo Province, Ethiopia (now Oromia Region, Ethiopia)
- Education: Bachelor Degree in Accounting and Finance
- Alma mater: Arba Minch University
- Occupation: Pentecostal pastor
- Years active: 2016–present
- Organization: Melkam Wetat
- Television: MarSil (Addis Kidan Kahinat)

Yonatan Aklilu Anjulo (Amharic: ዮናታን አክሊሉ አንጁሎ; born 15 June 1985) is an Ethiopian Pentecostal pastor. He is known for his project called Melkam Wetat/Excellent Youth. On 6 September 2020, Ethiopian Prime Minister Abiy Ahmed offered Yonatan an award of 25,000 euros for his contribution to the youth of Ethiopia through the Hessian Peace Prize in 2019.

== Background ==
Yonatan Alkilu was born in Kebri Mangest in the present-day Oromia Region, Ethiopia, and raised in Negele Arsi, Ethiopia. He completed his primary and secondary school in Negele Arsi. He received his Bachelor of Arts in Accounting and Finance from Arba Minch University. He had served as a teacher at the Adventist College, Kuyera Africa Beza and the Rift Valley University College. He became a gospel teacher and launched a religious TV channel called Marcil after founding a church named Addis Kidan Kahinat.

In 2017, Yonatan launched a project called Melkam Wetat (Excellent Youth), which is focused on the youth of Ethiopia regardless of their religious background. More than 100,000 students graduated from this project. Melkam Wetat's head office is now in Hawassa, Ethiopia.

On 21 December 2020, on behalf of Melkam Wetat, Yonatan donated 10 million Ethiopian birr for a school feeding project that was launched by the Addis Ababa city administrator.

In late 2022, Yonatan was accused by the Ethiopian Orthodox Church of "hate speech" for insulting the theology of the Church and view of Virgin Mary and saints. The Church then summoned six leaders in the Inter-Religious Council from Islamic Affairs. According to Abune Abraham, head of the patriarchate office, the church would not continue to foster in the council as anti-Orthodox sentiment grew in the country.
