= Ellene Mocria =

Ethiopian newscaster and producer

- Born: 1941; Adis Ababa
- Citizenship: Ethiopia
- Occupation: Journalist

Woizero Elleni Mekuria or Ellene Mocria (1941–2021) was an Ethiopian radio and television journalist. After joining the External Service of the Voice of Ethiopia in 1962, she was Ethiopia's first female radio newscaster and producer. In 1964, when Ethiopian Television began broadcasting, she became Ethiopia's first woman television journalist.

== Life ==
Ellene Mocria was born in Addis Ababa on 10 October 1941. Her father Mocria Wolde Selassie was an agronomist. Her mother Suzi Workneh was daughter of the physician and diplomat Workneh Eshete. After attending the Sandford English School Ellene won a scholarship to study nursing at the American University of Beirut, but was dropped from the course after impulsively mis-prescribing. She intended to apply to Addis Ababa University and become a social worker, but meanwhile responded to a job advertisement for an English radio announcer and newscaster to work on Radio Ethiopia's new External Service.

Ellene was hired as program producer and English newscaster at the External Service in September 1962, presenting news bulletins as well as music programs like Music to Remember and Lie Back and Listen. Cataloguing the station's music collections, she was eventually promoted to also head the Transcription Library. She supplemented the station's collection with a collection of her own 78 rpm records, including work by Negatwa Kelkye and her husband Ferede Golla, Etagennho Haile, Bafana Gobaze, Bogalech Yimer, Abebech Azene, Beyene Omardin, and Mesganaw Adugna. In 1964, when Ethiopian Television was established, Ellene and Samuel Ferenji became the country's first television journalists. Continuing her radio work, she now also presented TV Mag, and interviewed personalities for Guest of the Week.

In the early 1970s she left TV to become coordinator of vocational schools run by the Young Women's Christian Association. After the Ethiopian Revolution, many YWCA workers were arrested. She raised money to ensure that trainees could graduate, though the YWCA was subsequently nationalized and closed down.

Ellene returned to broadcasting working for Radio Voice of the Gospel (RVOG), later nationalized as the Radio Voice of Revolutionary Ethiopia. She later recalled the political pressures from the ministry of information: "The first thing we had to do was to heap insults on the previous government and glorify communism. Then we were allowed to start our programs." She was consecutively banned from radio hosting, promoted to head of the Head of the Public Relations Office of the External Service, and pensioned off a year later. She subsequently worked as a consultant, a BBC correspondent, and a trainer in journalism. For a year, from January 2002, she was English-language announcer for Radio UNMEE, run by the United Nations Mission in Ethiopia and Eritrea (UNMEE).

In 2003 she gifted her musical collection to the Institute of Ethiopian Studies.

Ellene Mocria died of cancer in Addis Ababa on 21 July 2021. Married to her teenage boyfriend, engineer Seyfu Lemma, for over 50 years, she had four girls (one adopted) and seven grandchildren.
