= Samuel Gebru =

Ethiopian American activist (born 1991)

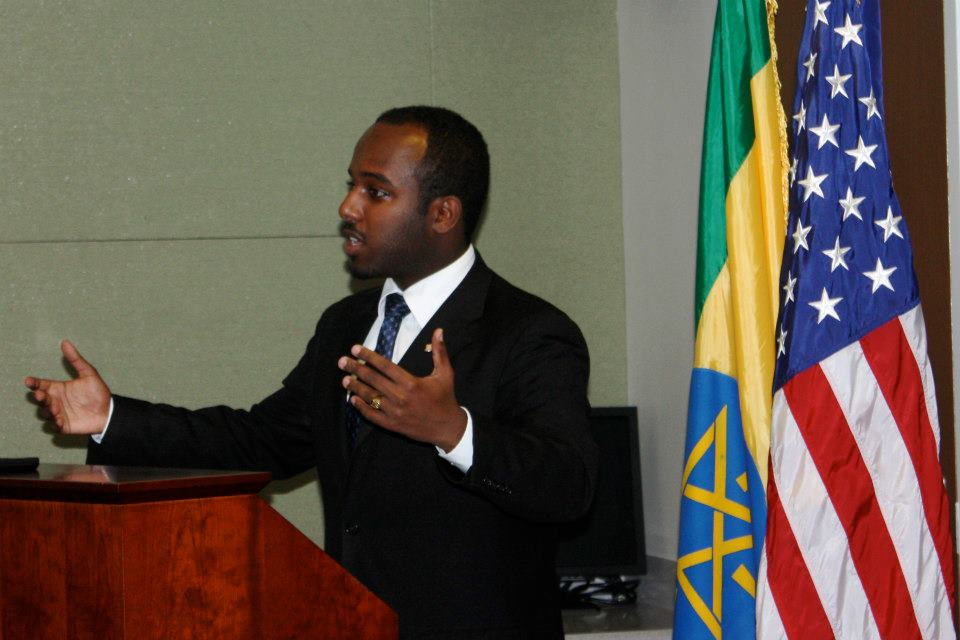
- Born: November 20, 1991 (age 34); Khartoum, Sudan
- Education: Cambridge Rindge and Latin School
- Title: Ethiopian Global Initiative (founder & former CEO)
- Website: smgebru.com

Samuel Gebru (born November 20, 1991) is an Ethiopian American activist and professor at Tufts University.

== Early life ==
Samuel was born at the Palestine Hospital in Khartoum, Sudan. Samuel's parents are both Ethiopian with his father being from Wukro, Tigray and his mother from Hawzen, Tigray. He graduated from the Cambridge Rindge and Latin School in 2009.

== Political Involvement ==
He has worked with and consulted for various local political campaigns. In 2017 he ran for Cambridge City Council. He was not successful.

== Ethiopian Global Initiative ==
Gebru is the founder and former chief executive officer of the Ethiopian Global Initiative (EGI). He founded EGI in 2006 as a 14-year-old and led its development and growth until 2016, when he decided to run for office. Based in U.S., the nonprofit organized activists in Ethiopia and abroad. The Initiative's mission was to serve as a catalyst and connector, working to create an environment where passionate and innovative young leaders could discuss and seek solutions to Ethiopia's most pressing challenges.

After watching the 2004 Oprah Winfrey Show program on fistula in Ethiopia and the work of Dr. Catherine Hamlin, Samuel was motivated to organize youth and raise funds for the Addis Ababa Fistula Hospital. At age 13, he convened a meeting of 13 Ethiopian American youth in Boston and discussed how they could support the hospital. The group was known as the "Ethiopian Team." The project's 13 members raised funds totaling $900 to sponsor 11 women for obstetric fistula repair surgery. On October 22, 2006, the Ethiopian American Youth Initiative was formed as a successor to the Ethiopian Team. The Ethiopian American Youth Initiative embarked on a national expansion on August 16, 2007, recruiting members throughout the United States. On February 12, 2010, the organization opened its headquarters in Cambridge, Massachusetts, located in Samuel's home. After the 2010 Ethiopian American Youth Initiative Conference in Washington, D.C., the organization changed its name to the Ethiopian Global Initiative. The organization has since become defunct.

== Career ==
Gebru runs a consulting company, Black Lion Strategies. He, and the organization, were presented with the Lewis Latimer Award in 2024 by Associated Industries of Massachusetts, "for their dedication to public service and economic opportunity".

Gebru is a senior fellow at the Center for State Policy Analysis at the Jonathan M. Tisch College of Civic Life. He is professor of practice in political science at Tufts University.

== Personal life ==
Gebru lives in Cambridge, Massachusetts. He is Ethiopian Orthodox Christian and multilingual.
