= Asi Vassihon =

Israeli footballer

Asi Vassihon אסי וסיהון
Personal information
- Full name: Aisso Vassihon
- Date of birth: July 31, 1982 (age 44)
- Place of birth: Ethiopia
- Height: 5 ft 9 in (1.75 m)
- Position: Defensive midfielder

Team information
- Current team: F.C. Ironi Ariel

Youth career
- Maccabi Netanya

Senior career*
Years	Team	Apps	(Gls)
2001–2009	Maccabi Netanya	101	(4)
2006–2009	→ Hapoel Nazareth Illit (loan)	80	(6)
2009–2011	Hapoel Kfar Saba	40	(1)
2013	Maccabi Kiryat Gat	14	(0)
2016–2021	F.C. Ironi Ariel	102	(2)
2021–2022	Hapoel Ganei Tikva	15	(0)

International career
2003	Israel U21	6	(0)
- * Club domestic league appearances and goals

Asi Vassihon (Hebrew: אסי וסיהון; born 31 July 1982) is a former footballer. Born in Ethiopia, he represented Israel at youth level.

== Career ==
Vassihon immigrated to Israel in 1989 and began playing in the youth department of Maccabi Netanya until the season 2001–02, when he was chosen to the senior squad of Maccabi Netanya.

In 2006, he was loaned to Hapoel Nazareth Illit, then in the Liga Leumit, for one season, a loan that was later prolonged for two years. Vassihon was published, negatively, because of suspicion over selling games in the 2006–07 season. However, the affair ended as it began, and Vassihon was cleared of any wrongdoing.

In September 2009 he signed for Hapoel Kfar Saba. He played there for two and a half years until he got injured and was released from his contract in the end of 2011.

In January 2013 he returned to play football as he signed for Maccabi Kiryat Gat in Liga Alef.

== International career ==
Vassihon has represented his country as he won 6 caps in the Israel national under-21 football team, the first of which was on 29 January 2003, against Turkey.

== Club career statistics ==
(correct as of April 2013)

Club	Season	League			Cup			Toto Cup			Total		
Club	Season	Apps	Goals	Assists	Apps	Goals	Assists	Apps	Goals	Assists	Apps	Goals	Assists
Maccabi Netanya	2001–02	1	0	0	1	0	0	1	0	0	3	0	0
Maccabi Netanya	2002–03	25	0	0	1	0	0	7	0	0	33	0	0
Maccabi Netanya	2003–04	26	0	0	3	0	0	8	0	0	37	0	0
Maccabi Netanya	2004–05	26	0	0	1	0	0	5	0	0	32	0	0
Maccabi Netanya	2005–06	23	1	1	0	0	0	8	0	0	31	1	1
Hapoel Nazareth Illit	2006-07	22	0	0	2	0	0	5	0	0	29	0	0
Hapoel Nazareth Illit	2007–08	29	0	0	1	0	0	7	0	0	37	0	0
Hapoel Nazareth Illit	2008–09	29	6	3	3	1	0	3	0	0	35	7	3
Hapoel Kfar Saba	2009–10	21	0	0	1	0	0	2	0	0	24	0	0
Hapoel Kfar Saba	2010–11	19	1	0	2	0	0	7	0	0	28	1	0
Hapoel Kfar Saba	2011–12	0	0	0	0	0	0	0	0	0	0	0	0
Maccabi Kiryat Gat	2012-13	14	0	0	0	0	0	0	0	0	14	0	0
Career		235	8	4	15	0	0	46	0	0	296	9	4

== Honours ==
- Toto Cup (Leumit):
  - Winner (1): 2004–05
- Liga Leumit:
  - Runner-up (1): 2004–05
