= Adeneko Svhat-Haimovitch =

Israeli judge

Adenko Svhat-Haimovitch
- אדנקו סבחת-חיימוביץ
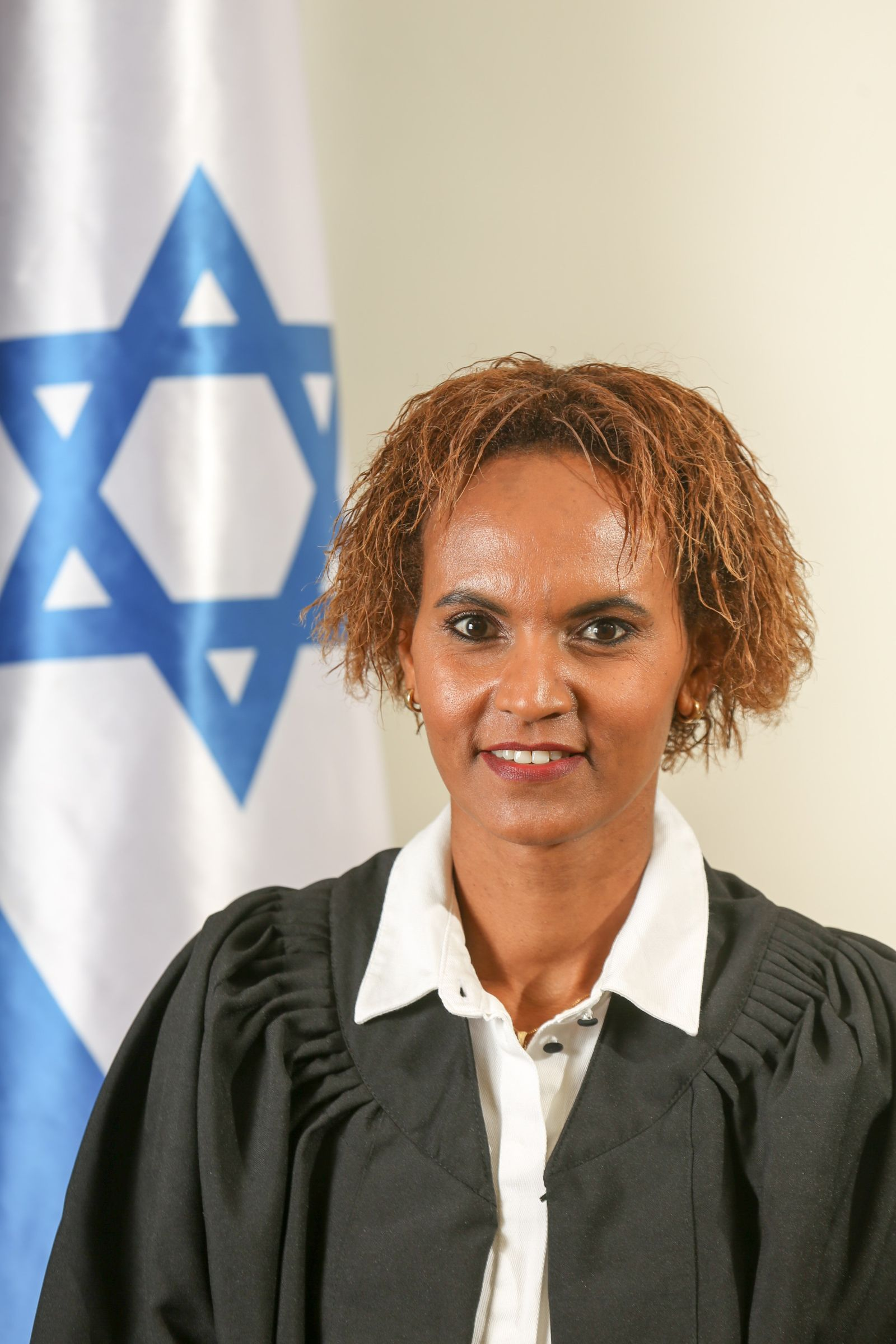
- Born: 1976 (age 49–50); Mawari, Gondar, Ethiopia
- Occupations: Lawyer, Judge
- Known for: One of the first two Ethiopian judges in Israel
- Spouse: Yotam Haimovich

Adenko Svhat-Haimovitch (Hebrew: אדנקו סבחת-חיימוביץ; born 1976) is an Israeli Lawyer who serves as a Judge in the Magistrate's Court in the Central District of Israel. Svhat-Haimovitch is one of the first two judges from Ethiopia appointed in Israel (along with Esther Tafta-Gerdi).

== Personal life ==
Svhat-Haimovitch was born in 1967 in the village of Mawari near the city of Gondar in the state of Amhara in northern Ethiopia. Her name, Adenko in Amharic means "praise." She is the fourth daughter of Sarah and Taga Sabhat's six children. She has more siblings from her father's other marriage. When she was eight, she immigrated to Israel via Sudan as part of Beta Israel with her family. After walking on foot to Sudan, her family arrived in Israel on a secret flight as part of Operation Moses. Upon arriving in Israel, her family settled in the Ramot Alon neighborhood of Jerusalem. Svhat-Haimovitch's father worked in a printing house, and her mother worked as a cleaner.

In 2013, she married musician Yotam Haimovich. Haimovich's brother is Tel Aviv Magistrate's Court Judge Rami Haimovich.

== Education ==
As the daughter of a traditional Jewish family, Svhat-Haimovitch attended a state-religious school. In high school she moved to Kfar Batya boarding school but after two years, she returned home and completed her studies at Rene Kassen High School, graduating in 1995. Svhat-Haimovitch enrolled in the Israel Defense Forces reserve, and began studying for a bachelor's degree in law at Tel Aviv University, completing her degree in 2000. In 2002 Svhat-Haimovitch passed the Bar Exam and was certified by the Israeli Bar Association. In 2008, she graduated with a Masters in Law through a joint program between Tel-Aviv University and Northwestern University.

== Career ==
In 2000, Svhat-Haimovitch enlisted in the Israel Defense Forces (IDF). During her service in the IDF, she worked as a legal advisor, prosecutor, and defense attorney in the Military Prosecutor's Office. In 2006, she graduated from military service as an outstanding officer with the rank of Captain.

Afterwards, Svhat-Haimovitch continued to work with a colleague from the army, Adv. Ilan Katz, joining the private law firm he founded representing suspects and criminal defendants. In many cases she represented the accused as part of an agreement with the Public Defender's Office.

Public Defender Michal Urakbi of the Public Defender's Office described Svhat-Haimovitch:

"Her judicial representation is not aggressive, but filled with values, and she knows how to stand up for herself ... she has succeeded in bridging the cultural differences that characterize the immigrant population."

Svhat-Haimovitch volunteered as a lawyer for the Takaba Association, an organization dedicated to promote Ethiopians' rights in Israel, and fight against discrimination and racism directed at members of the community. In 2013, Svhat-Haimovtich served as a member of its board of directors.

=== Ethiopian protests ===
On April 26, 2015, Israeli police officers assaulted and arrested an Ethiopian-Israeli, Damas Pakada, while he was wearing his IDF uniform. A video of the incident went viral, sparking Ethiopian-Israeli protests against discrimination and alleged police brutality against the Ethiopian community. During the protests, Svhat-Haimovitch represented many of the protesters arrested by the police.

After the protests, Svhat-Haimovitch was selected as an Ethiopian representative in discussions with the Police Commissioner Yohanan Danino. Svhat-Haimovtich sent Danino a letter of appreciation following the meeting, which was criticized by social activists as contradicting the purpose of the meeting.

Following the protests, in July 2016, an Israeli State Panel issued a report on Eradicating Racism against Ethiopian-Israelis. The 170-page report contained 53 recommendations, including equipping police with body cameras, limiting their use of stun guns in areas with many Ethiopian residents, and combating racism in government ministries.

=== Judicial appointment ===
In September 2016, two months after the report was issued, the Judicial Selection Committee announced that among 26 appointees, for the first time in Israel's history, two Ethiopian lawyers were elected judges - Svhat-Haimovitch and Esther Tafta-Gerdi. In September 2016, Svhat-Haimovitch was selected by the Central District Magistrate's Judicial Selection Committee. There was some criticism following Svhat-Haimovitch's appointment due to her support of former Police Commissioner Danino.
