= Teklehaimanot =

Teklehaimanot is a surname of Ethiopian origin. It is derived from the name of an Ethiopian monk and saint, Tekle Haymanot (c. 1215 – c. 1313). People with that name include:

- Abraham Teklehaimanot (born before 2008), Ethiopian football player and coach.
- Daniel Teklehaimanot (born 1988), Eritrean professional road racing cyclist
- Fitsum Teklehaimanot (born 1987), Ethiopian international football player
- Hailu Tekle Haymanot (AKA Hailu II of Gojjam, 1868–1950), Ethiopian nobleman and military commander
- Kidane-Mariam Teklehaimanot (1933-2009), bishop of the Ethiopian Catholic Church

== See also ==
- Abuna Takla Haymanot (1918-1988), third Patriarch of the Ethiopian Orthodox Tewahido Church
- Mara Takla Haymanot (10th century), Emperor of Ethiopia
- Tekle Haymanot (disambiguation)
