= Hannington Kalyesubula =

Ugandan footballer (born 1982)

Hanny Kalyesubula
Personal information
- Full name: Hannington Kalyesubula
- Date of birth: December 7, 1982 (age 43)
- Place of birth: Uganda
- Height: 1.80 m (5 ft 11 in)
- Position: Goalkeeper

Team information
- Current team: Mbeya City FC
- Number: 30

Youth career
- –2000: Villa SC

Senior career*
Years	Team	Apps	(Gls)
2001–2004	Villa SC		
2005–2006	Police Jinja		
2006–2008	Saint-George SA		
2008–2010	Villa SC		
2010–2014	Kagera Sugar		
2014	KJT Rwenshama		
2015–	Rwenshama FCMbeya City 2015		

International career
2002–2007	Uganda	7	(0)
- * Club domestic league appearances and goals

Hannington Kalyesubula (born January 28, 1982) is a Ugandan footballer, who currently plays for Rwenshama FC in the Ugandan Super League.

== Career ==
He began his career by Villa SC in the Ugandan Premier League, later move to Police Jinja, before in 2006 transferred to Saint-George SA in the Ethiopian Premier League. After two years in Ethiopia, SC Villa signed him on December 14, 2008 on a two-year contract., before moved on August 4, 2010 to Tanzania premier league outfit Kagera Sugar.

=== International career ===
The goalkeeper was a member of the Uganda.
