= Melesse Temesgen =

Ethiopian agricultural engineer and hydrologist

- Born: July 7, 1964; Gojjam, Ethiopia
- Occupations: Agricultural engineer, Inventor
- Organization(s): CEO, Aybar Engineering
- Known for: Broad Bed and Furrow (BBM) plough

Melesse Temesgen (born July 7, 1964, in Gojjam, Ethiopia) is an Ethiopian agricultural engineer, hydrologist and businessman. He is the CEO of Aybar Engineering PLC.

== Education ==
In 1980 Temesgen finished secondary school. He then studied Agricultural Engineering at Alemaya College of Agriculture, Addis Ababa University. In July 1984, he graduated with distinction. In the same year he joined the Institute of Agricultural Research. In 1987, he received an MSc in Agricultural Engineering from the University of Newcastle upon Tyne, United Kingdom.

== Career ==
After his studies Temesgen returned to Ethiopia. He worked as researcher for 15 years. From 1997 until 2001, he also coordinated the National Agricultural Mechanization Research Program. From 2002 until 2006, Temesgen worked on his PhD at UNESCO-IHE and at the department of Water Resources of the TU Delft, Netherlands. After the completion of his PhD, he taught at Addis Ababa Institute of Technology and was assistant professor at the School of Civil and Environmental Engineering at Addis Ababa University. Temesgen then founded his own company Aybar Engineering in Addis Ababa.

== Awards ==
In 2002 Temesgen received the National Award for Outstanding Achievement in Science and Technology from the National Science and Technology Council for development of Animal drawn mold board plough together with the then Melkassa Agricultural Implements Research and Improvement Center (AIRIC) colleagues .

In 2014, he won the Special Prize for Social Impact by the African Innovation Foundation.

In 2019, he won a $25,000 award for social impact at the Global Entrepreneurship Summit in The Hague.

== Publications ==
- Conservation Tillage Systems and Water Productivity - Implications for Smallholder Farmers in Semi-Arid Ethiopia: PhD, UNESCO-IHE Institute for Water Education, Delft, The Netherlands
- Effect of Winged Subsoiler and Traditional Tillage Integrated with Fanya Juu on Selected Soil Physico-Chemical and Soil Water Properties in the Northwestern Highlands of Ethiopia
- Rainwater harvesting and management in rainfed agricultural systems in sub-Saharan Africa – A review (2012)
- Assessment of strip tillage systems for maize production in semi-arid Ethiopia: effects on grain yield and water balance (July 11, 2007)
- Determinants of tillage frequency among smallholder farmers in two semi-arid areas in Ethiopia (December 2008)
- Conservation tillage for improved and sustainable crop production under Nitosols and Vertisols of the Lake Tana Basin (January 2017)
- Effects of Conservation Tillage Integrated with ‘Fanya Juus’ Structure on Soil Loss in Northern Ethiopia (January 2014)
- The role of water harvesting to achieve sustainable agricultural intensification and resilience against water related shocks in sub-Saharan Africa (December 2013)
- Participatory Planning of Appropriate Rainwater Harvesting and Management Techniques in the Central Rift Valley Dry Lands of Ethiopia (May 2014)
- Animal-drawn implements for improved cultivation in Ethiopia: participatory development and testing (January 1999)
- Water Balance Modeling of Upper Blue Nile Catchments Using a Top-Down Approach
- Impacts of conservation tillage on the hydrological and agronomic performance of fanya juus in the upper Blue Nile (Abbay) river basin (January 2012)
- On-farm evaluation of soil moisture conservation techniques using improved germplasm (January 2004)
- Conservation Farming among Small-Holder Farmers in E. Africa: Adapting and Adopting Innovative Land Management Options (January 2003)
- On-farm evaluation of an animal-drawn implement developed in Ethiopia for row placement of wheat seed and basal fertilizer (January 2004)
- Conservation Farming strategies in East and Southern Africa: Yields and rain water productivity from on-farm action research (April 2009)
- Determinants of Tillage Frequency Among Smallholder Farmers in Two Semi-Arid Areas in Ethiopia (December 2008)
- Conservation tillage implements and systems for smallholder farmers in semi-arid Ethiopia (June 2009)
- The effect of long-term Maresha ploughing on soil physical properties in the Central Rift Valley of Ethiopia (January 2011)
- Water balance modeling of Upper Blue Nile catchments using a top-down approach (September 2010)
- Conservation agriculture in dryland agro-ecosystems of Ethiopia (January 2011)
- Water-smart agriculture in East Africa (April 2015)
- Rainwater harvesting and management in rainfed agricultural systems in sub-Saharan Africa – A review (December 2012)
- Impacts of conservation tillage on the hydrological and agronomic performance of Fanya juus in the upper Blue Nile (Abbay) river basin (December 2012)
- Assessment of strip tillage systems for maize production in semi-arid Ethiopia: Effects on grain yield, water balance and water productivity (December 2012)
- Conservation tillage systems and water productivity implications for smallholder farmers in semi-arid Ethiopia (January 2007)
- Development and evaluation of tillage implements for maize production in the dryland areas of Ethiopia
- Development and Introduction of conservation Agriculture at the proposed Lake Tana Biosphere Reserve (March 2014)
