= Abebech Gobena =

Ethiopian humanitarian (1935–2021)

- Born: 20 October 1935; Shebel, Shewa Province, Ethiopian Empire (now Shebel, Oromia Region, Ethiopia)
- Died: 4 July 2021 (aged 85); St. Paul's Hospital, Addis Ababa, Ethiopia
- Burial place: Holy Trinity Cathedral, Addis Ababa, Ethiopia
- Occupation: Humanitarian
- Years active: 1973–2021
- Organization: Abebech Gobena Charity

Abebech Gobena (Amharic: አበበች ጎበና; Afan Oromo: Abbabach Goobanaa; 20 October 1935 – 4 July 2021) was an Ethiopian humanitarian, and the founder and manager of AGOHELMA, now rebranded as Abebech Gobena Charity, one of the oldest orphanages in Ethiopia. She was often called the "Mother Teresa of Africa".

== Life and career ==
Abebech was born on 20 October 1935, in a small rural village in Oromia Region, North shoa, called Shebel. Her father was killed during the Second Italo-Ethiopian War, so she was raised by her grandparents until the age of nine. At the age of 10, she was married without her consent, but she ran away to the capital, Addis Ababa. There, she managed to get basic education and later worked as a quality controller at a coffee and grain company.

She went to Gishen Mariam, Wollo Province, for pilgrimage in 1973. At the time, the area was severely stricken by famine. In a feeding center, Gobena saw a child next to her dead mother. She distributed the only thing she had to other victims, a loaf of bread and five liters of holy water, and brought the child along with another orphan to her home in Addis Ababa. In one year, she brought 21 children to her home.

Abebech Gobena Yehetsanat Kebekebena limat Mahber (AGOHELMA) was founded by Abebech in 1980 and has become one of the earliest orphanages serving youth in the Ethiopia. AGOHELMA provides various services in addition to the orphanage itself, including formal and non-formal education, HIV/AIDS prevention activities, habitat improvement and infrastructure development, empowerment of women, among others. Additionally, it provides institutional care for 150 orphans. Since its establishment, over 12,000 needy children have been supported by the association with over 1.5 million people having benefited either directly or indirectly from the association in different regions of the country.

In June 2021, Abebech's health worsened from COVID-19 and she was hospitalized at St. Paul's Hospital in Addis Ababa. However, she died from the complications on 4 July 2021. Her burial took place on 6 July at Holy Trinity Cathedral with government officials and mourners. Patriarch of the Ethiopian Orthodox Church Abune Matias, President of Oromia Region Shimelis Abdisa, Deputy Mayor of Addis Ababa Adanech Abebe and other public figures also attended the funeral.

== See also ==
- List of Ethiopians
