= Shantam Shubissa =

Ethiopian singer and composer

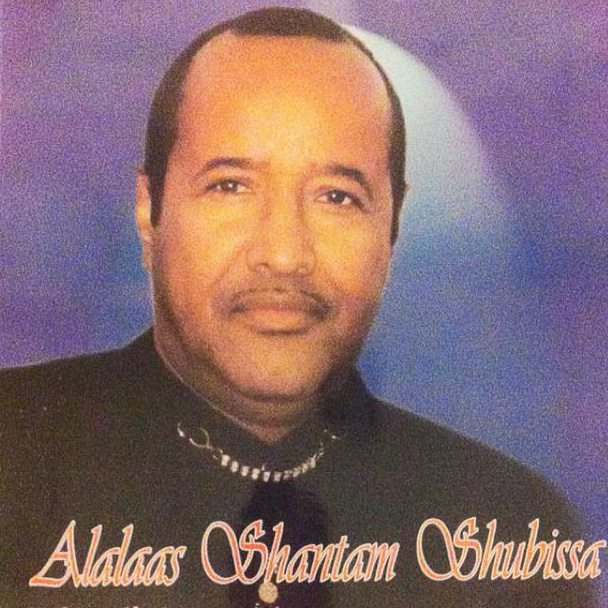

Background information
- Born: Mohamed Ibrahim Waday; 25 December 1949 (age 75); Magaala Xiqqoo, Dire Dawa, Ethiopian Empire
- Genres: World music; Oromo music
- Occupations: Singer; composer; poet
- Years active: 1968–present

Shantam Shubisa (born Mohamed Ibrahim Waday; 25 December 1949) is an Ethiopian composer, singer and poet. He was born in Dire Dawa, Ethiopia. Along with musicians such as Ali Birra, Shantam Shubissa is regarded as one of Oromian significant contributors to music during the late 20th century

His stage name "Shantam" means "fifty". It was given after Shantam released a song where he composed the same chorus in five different languages: Arabic, Oromo, Somali, Amharic and Harari. The word Shan is "five" morphed into Shantam to fifty. The surname Shubissa is derived from the word Shuba which means to dance Shubissa meaning dancer and was added Together, his name is translated as "fifty the dancer.

== Musical career ==
Shantam released many songs ranging from a variety of topics including love, nature and revolutionary politics. Although he has not released an official collection of poetry, his most famed classic songs include: "Alaaba Nagayaa", (Banner of Peace), "Naaf si uume" (You were created for me), "Yaa Quburee" (Hey Gorgeous), and "Yaa haadha too" (My mother).

== Awards ==
In 1995, Shantam was awarded for his contributions by the Oromo Radio Committee in Melbourne, Australia. He also received recognition for contribution to language and culture, a lifetime contribution to music and arts award in Melbourne, Australia; 2000 and was officially invited back to Africa, after decades in exile., as a special guest to open the Oromo Cultural Centre in Adama, Oromia in 2006. Shantam also toured United States, Canada and Germany numerous times, singing to Oromo people living outside his native country.
