= Aster Ganno =

Ethiopian Bible translator

Aster Ganno (c.1872–1964) was an Ethiopian Bible translator who worked with the better known Onesimos Nesib on the translation of the Oromo Bible published in 1899.

== Biography ==
Aster (referred to by her first name according to Ethiopian custom) while born free was later enslaved by the king of Limmu-Ennarea. She was emancipated in 1886 when Italian ships intercepted a boat transporting her to be sold on the Arabian Peninsula. She was then taken to Eritrea where the Imkullu school of the Swedish Evangelical Mission took her in and educated her. Bible translator Onesimos quickly “discovered that Aster was endowed with considerable mental gifts and possessed a real feeling for the Oromo language” (Arén 1978:383). She was assigned to compile an Oromo dictionary, which was first used in polishing a translation of the New Testament published in 1893.

Aster also translated a book of Bible stories and recorded five hundred traditional Oromo riddles, fables, proverbs, and songs, many of which were published in a volume for beginning readers (1894). She later worked with Onesimos in compiling an Oromo hymnbook. Arén reports that a large amount of the folklore she collected is still unpublished although preserved by the Hylander family (1978:384, fn. 71).

Aster and Onesimos completed their translation of the Bible into Oromo, which was printed in 1899. Although the title page and history credit Onesimos as the translator, it appears that Aster's contribution was not, and still is not, adequately appreciated.

In 1904, Aster, together with Onesimos and other Oromos, were able to move from Eritrea back to Wellega, where they established schools, Aster serving as a teacher at Nekemte.
