= Negeri Lencho =

Ethiopian academic and politician

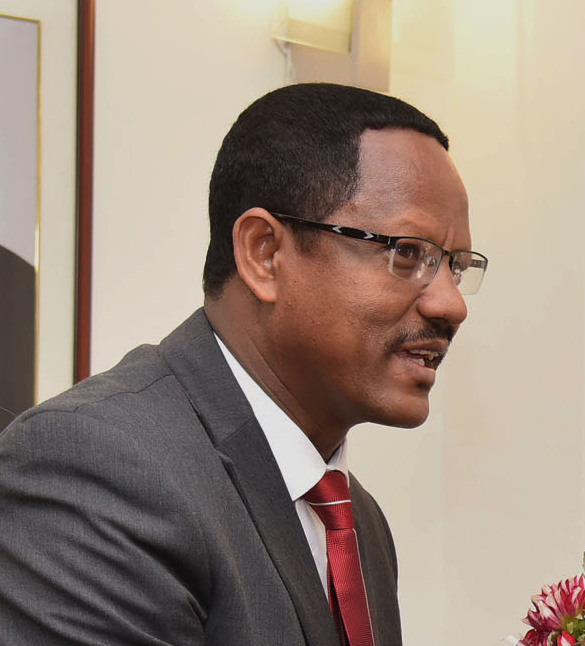
- Lencho in March 2017

Minister of Communication Affairs
- In office 1 November 2016 – 19 April 2018
- Preceded by: Getachew Reda
- Succeeded by: Ahmed Shide

Personal details
- Education: English and Foreign Languages University; Andhra University (PhD); Addis Ababa University

Negeri Lencho is an Ethiopian academic and politician who has served as the Minister of Communication Affairs in the cabinet of Hailemariam Dessalegn from 2016 to 2018, succeeding Getachew Reda.

== Education ==
Lencho completed a master's degree from the English and Foreign Languages University in 2004. He later received his PhD from Andhra University in India in 2011, and went on to teach at Addis Ababa University, serving as Assistant Dean of the Faculty of Language Studies. He previously wrote articles critical of the government's dominance of the domestic media.

== Views and public engagements ==
- Unemployed youth behind Ethiopia's anti-govt protests
- Unemployment Main Cause for Protests in Ethiopia
- Support for vibrant media landscape as foundation for democracy
