= Sebhat Gebre-Egziabher =

Ethiopian writer (1936–2012)

- ስብሐት ለአብ ገብረ እግዚአብሔር
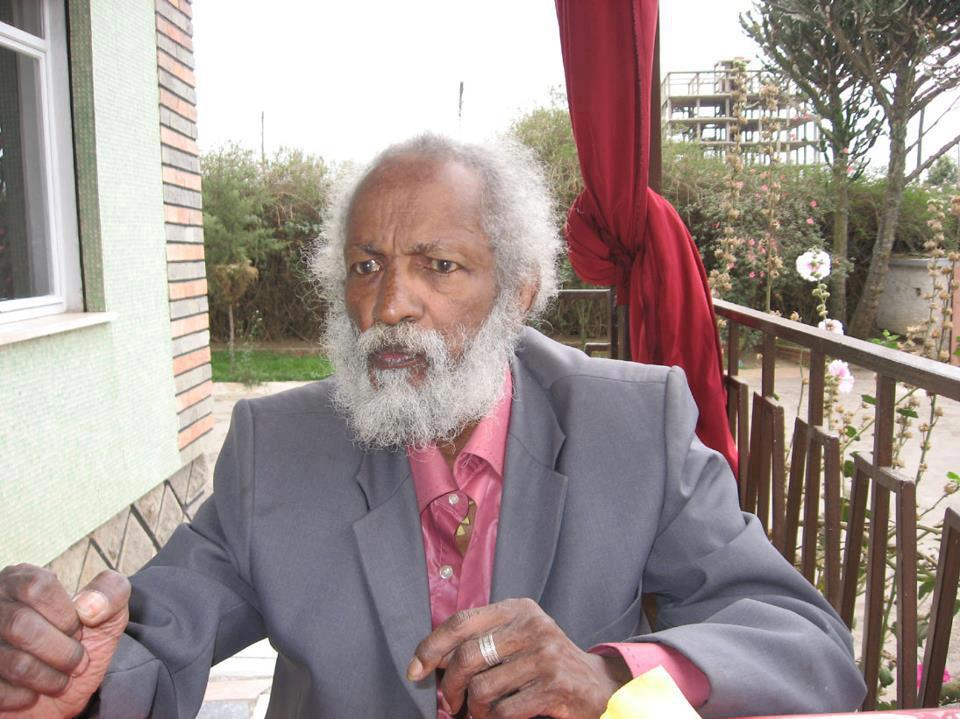
- Sebhat in 2009
- Born: 5 May 1936; Adwa, Tigray Province, Ethiopian Empire
- Died: 20 February 2012 (aged 75–76); Addis Ababa, Ethiopia
- Citizenship: Ethiopian
- Occupation: Writer
- Relatives: Tewolde Berhan Gebre Egziabher
- Writing career
- Language: Tigrigna, Amharic, English, French
- Notable works: ትኩሳት (Fever) ሌቱም አይነጋልኝ (Endless Night) ሰባተኛው መላክ (The Seventh Angel)

Sebhat-Leab Gebre-Egziabher (Tigrinya: ስብሐት ለአብ ገብረ እግዚአብሔር; 5 May 1936 – 20 February 2012) was an Ethiopian writer from Tigray Region. He is famous for pioneering the naturalist writing style in Amharic. His writing style was not constrained by the traditional Ethiopian writing style nor orthodox syntax. Despite using simple words and seemingly light prose, Sebhat's concepts are highly sophisticated and philosophical.

== Biography ==
Sebhat was born on 6 May 1936 near the historical town of Adwa, Tigray in a village called Erba Gered. He is the brother of the scientist Tewolde Berhan Gebre Egziabher.

Sebhat originally intended to be a librarian. He visited Washington in 1960 and stayed there a year. At that time he was intending to write in English. He decided however that Amharic is better suited for his subject matter. He later visited France and received an award from UNESCO.

Sebhat published works of fiction and non fiction in French and Amharic. Some of his works have been translated into English. He also worked as a journalist and columnist for the Ethiopian Herald, Addis Zemen, Menen, and other magazines and newspapers.

During the years 1971-73 Sebhat was a principal in the Ethiopian firm, Alem, headed by Dereje Deressa, that managed and operated the U.S. Peace Corps in-country Volunteer training program.

== Works ==
=== Amharic ===
- ሌቱም አይነጋልኝ Dawn Yet Not
- ትኩሳት Tekusat (Fever), 1997 (romance)
- ሰባተኛው መላክ Säbatägnaw Mälak (The 7th Angel), 1999 (romance)
- እግረ፡ መንገድ ፩ እና ፪ Egrä Mängäd 1 enna 2 (Along the way 1 and 2), 2003
- ማስታወሻ Mastawäsha (Notes), 2001
- አምስት ስድስት ሰባት እና ሌሎችም ታሪኮች (Five, Six, Seven and Other Stories), 1988. Addis Ababa: Bolé Matemia Bet. OCLC 24411077
- የፍቅር ሻማዎች (Love Candles)
- ቦርጨቅ Borchek
- ስምንተኛው ጋጋታ Semntegnaw Gagata(The Eighth Din)
- ዛዚ Zazi
- እነሆ ጀግና Eneho Jegna(Behold The Hero)
- የትረካ ጥበብ Yetireka Tibeb(The Art Of Narration)

=== English ===
- Seeds and other stories, retold in English by Wendy Kindred. African Sun Publishing. Aventures, 2004 - ISBN 1-883701-03-1

=== French ===
- Les Nuits d'Addis-Abeba, Paris, Actes Sud coll. Aventures, 2004 - ISBN 2-7427-4907-1, Translated by the author and Francis Falceto; Original title: ሌቱም፡ አይነጋልኝ, I will not see the end of the night, 2004.
- "Letum Aynegalign
