= Onesimos Nesib =

Scholar

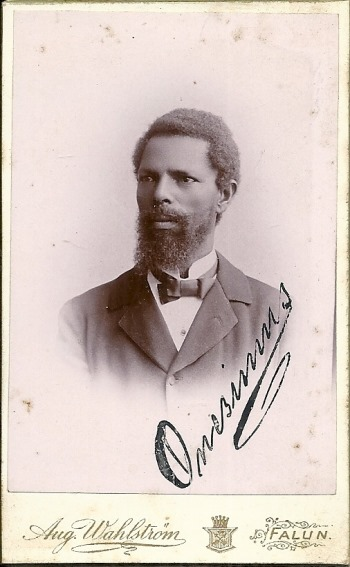
- Born: Hika Nesib; 1856; Hurumu, Ethiopia
- Died: June 21, 1931 (aged 74–75)
- Occupation: Scholar
- Known for: Translating the Bible into Oromo

Onesimos Nesib (Oromo: Onesimoos Nasiib; Amharic: ኦነሲሞስ ነሲብ; c 1856 – 21 June 1931) was a native Oromo scholar who converted to Lutheran Christianity and translated the Christian Bible into Oromo. His parents named him Hika as a baby, meaning "Translator"; he took the name "Onesimus", after the Biblical character, upon converting to Christianity.

Onesimos Nesib is included in the American Lutheran Book of Worship as a saint, who commemorate his life 21 June. The Mekane Yesus Church honored him by naming their seminary in Addis Ababa for him. He is also known to be the pioneer of modern Oromo literature.

== Life ==
Born near Hurumu in modern Ethiopia, Onesimos lost his father when he was four years old. According to an account he later wrote for the Board of the Swedish Evangelical Mission, he was kidnapped by slavers in 1869, and passed through the hands of eight owners until Werner Munzinger freed him at Massawa and had him educated at the Imkullu Swedish Evangelical Mission in that port city. There he proved a good student, and eventually received baptism on Easter Sunday (31 March 1872). He was sent to the Johannelund missionary seminary in Bromma, Sweden for five years to receive further education; upon his return to Massawa, he married Mehret Hailu.

He attempted to immediately return to his native Macha Oromo people, and to circumvent the travel restrictions Emperor Menelik II had imposed on foreign missionaries attempted to reach Welega by way of central Sudan. His party got no closer than Asosa, and were forced to return to the border town of Famaka, where Onesimos suffered from a fever. The party was forced back to Khartoum, which they reached on 10 April 1882 just as the Mahdist revolt broke out. Onesimos recovered from his illness, and found his way back to the Imkullu Mission, where while waiting further instructions he began the first of his many translations into Oromo. After attempting another unsuccessful mission to reach Welega in 1886, he began his translation of the entire Bible.

Unfortunately, Onesimos found that he lacked adequate knowledge of the words and idioms of his native language for he had not lived with his people since childhood, and he was forced to seek help. This came from Aster Ganno (1874–1964), a young girl who had been brought to Imkullu Mission, freed from a slave ship bound for Yemen by the Italian navy. Although she provided much of the material for the translation (which was published in 1899), Aster failed to receive any acknowledgement for her contributions.

It was not until 1904 that Onesimos at last returned to Welega at a place called Nedjo, where he was greeted with great honor by its governor, Dejazmach Gebre Egziabher. Unlike his predecessor, Onesimos preached to his flock in the Oromo language, which the local Ethiopian Orthodox priests could not understand, and incurred their hostility. This, combined with the esteem the local Oromo had for him, led to the priests alleging that he was blaspheming the Virgin Mary. He was brought before Abuna Mattheos in May 1906, who ordered that he be exiled upon the accusations of the local clergy. However Emperor Menelik reversed the Abuna's decision, and ruled that Onesimos could return to Nekemte, but could no longer preach.

While Onesimos limited his public actions in the next few years to teaching in his school at Nekemte, the threat of exile from his homeland continued to hang over his head until 1916 when Lij Iyasu granted him permission to preach his faith. Although Lij Iyasu was deposed the next year from his position as designated (but uncrowned) Emperor, his edict was not rescinded, and Onesimos continued to distribute his translations and preach until his death.

== Family ==
He was married to Mihiret, who died in childbirth in November 1888; he then married Lydia Dembo.

He had several children.

== See also ==
- List of kidnappings
- List of solved missing person cases

== Publications ==
- The Bible. 1899.
- Katekismos (Luther’s Catechism) (St. Chrischona) 1899.
- Garan Nama Mana Waqayo Yokis Ido Bulti Setana (Man’s Heart).
- The OROMO Spelling Book. Moncullo: Swedish Mission Press, 1894.

== Sources ==
- Arén, Gustav. 1978. Evangelical Pioneers in Ethiopia. Stockholm: EFS Vorlage.
