= Alemtsehay Wedajo =

Ethiopian actress, songwriter, and playwright (born 1955)

- Born: 1955 (age 70–71); Ethiopia
- Citizenship: Ethiopia
- Occupations: Playwritter, Actress

Alemtsehay Wedajo (Amharic: ዓለም ፀሐይ ወዳጆ, born October 1955) is an Ethiopian actress, songwriter, playwright, and founder of the Tayitu Cultural and Educational Center.

== Biography ==
Alemtsehay was born in October 1955 in Addis Ababa, Ethiopia. In her youth, she performed at venues including the Hager Fikir Theatre.

After graduating from high school, she trained under the poet Tsegaye Gabre-Medhin for two years, after which she began to act and write full-time.

She has written over 400 lyrics that were performed by over 40 artists, such as Aster Aweke, Theodros Teshome, and Ephrem Tamiru.

In January 2000, she founded the Tayitu Cultural and Education Center, a non-profit organization based in the Washington metropolitan area. The center primarily focuses on producing and presenting theatrical or literary works by Ethiopian-American authors. The center also supports a range of educational programs, including youth tutoring and mentoring schemes, along with providing lessons in Amharic poetry writing and acting for young Ethiopian-Americans. The center was named after Empress Taytu Betul, a co-founder of the city of Addis Ababa, known for her role in the 1896 Battle of Adwa.

Alemtsehay also founded and ran YeLijoch Amba—the First Children's Theater Group—running it from January 1990 to December 2000. This organization focused on training young, orphaned children in music and drama, and performed in multiple European and African countries.

She co-founded The Ethiopian Theatre Professionals Association and acted as chairperson for 14 years after its establishment, from January 1986 to January 2000.

=== Acting career ===
Alemtsehay wrote and directed Tiru Nakfaki. She has played the role of Ophelia in Hamlet, among others. In one of her films, Woven, she played an Ethiopian mother who holds to Ethiopian traditions while raising her Ethiopian-American daughters.

=== Activism ===
Alemtsehay has engaged in activism throughout her life. She is associated with the Ethiopian People's Revolutionary Party (EPRP).

=== Poems ===
Alemtsehay has written numerous poems, some of which are inspired by traditional war songs composed by women. For example; one of her poems, titled "Marèfia Yatach Hiwot," which translates to "Life without a resting place," was published in 1996.

Awards

She won the 2016 Bikila Award for her contribution to celebrating Ethiopian culture.
