= Lencho Skibba =

Ethiopian footballer (born 1988)

Personal information
- Date of birth: 18 February 1988 (age 38)
- Place of birth: Dire Dawa, Ethiopia
- Height: 1.69 m (5 ft 7 in)
- Position: Midfielder

Team information
- Current team: Minnesota Thunder
- Number: 19

Youth career
- 2003–2007: Alemannia Aachen

Senior career*
Years	Team	Apps	(Gls)
2007	Minnesota Thunder	5	(0)
2007–2008	Kastoria F.C.	6	(0)

International career
2007	Ethiopia		
- * Club domestic league appearances and goals as of 12 October 2009

Lencho Skibba (Amharic: ለንችሆ ጽኪብባ; born 18 February 1988 in Dire Dawa) is an Ethiopian football midfielder.

Skibba began his career with USL First Division side Minnesota Thunder, and joined Kastoria F.C. in the Greek Beta Ethniki for the 2007–08 season.

Skibba played youth football in Ethiopia until he was adopted by German parents in 2003. He played in the youth system for Alemannia Aachen until 2007, when he moved to the United States and joined the Minnesota Thunder.
