= Getachew Jigi Demeksa =

Ethiopian politician (born 1967)

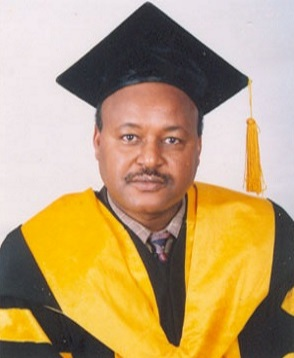
- Born: 4 December 1967 (age 58)
- Education: Russia Friendship University (1989–1997); Moscow State University (1997–2000)-->
- Occupation: Politician
- Political party: Oromo Federalist Democratic Movement

Getachew Jigi Demekssa (born 4 December 1967) is an Ethiopian politician. He was a Representative from the State of Oromia in the House of Peoples' Representatives 2005–2009, and a member of the Oromo Federalist Democratic Movement party.

== Works ==
- Bu'aa ba'ii qabsoo uummata Oromoo : sirna gabrummaa irraa gara bilisummaatti (2014) OCLC 930488999
