= Hayder Sherefa =

Ethiopian footballer (born 1994)

Personal information
- Full name: Hayder Sherefa Juber
- Date of birth: 11 January 1994 (age 32)
- Place of birth: Gambela, Ethiopia
- Position: Midfielder

Team information
- Current team: Adama City

Senior career*
| Years | Team | Apps | (Gls) |
| 2014–2015 | Dedebit | | |
| 2015–2018 | Hadiya Hossana | | |
| 2018–2019 | Mekelle 70 Enderta | | |
| 2019–2023 | Saint George | 82 | (8) |
| 2023– | Adama City | 0 | (0) |

International career^{‡}
| 2019– | Ethiopia | 11 | (0) |
- * Club domestic league appearances and goals as of 21:47, 8 July 2023 (UTC) ‡ National team caps and goals as of 21:47, 23 December 2021 (UTC)

Hayder Sherefa Juber (Amharic: ሃይደር ሸረፋ; born 11 January 1994) is an Ethiopian professional footballer who plays as a midfielder for Ethiopian Premier League club Adama City and the Ethiopia national team.

== Career ==
Sherefa began his career with Dedebit, followed with stints at Hadiya Hossana and Mekelle 70 Enderta. He signed with Saint George on 11 September 2019.

== International career ==
Sherefa made his international debut with the Ethiopia national team in a 4–3 2020 African Nations Championship qualification win over Djibouti on 4 August 2019.

== Honours ==
Mekelle 70 Enderta

- Ethiopian Premier League: 2018–19
