= Atsede Kidanu =

Ethiopian politician

Atsede Kidanu is an Ethiopian politician and diplomat.

== Biography ==
She was the first female to earn a bachelor's degree in law from Addis Ababa University and later focused on International Law in her postgraduate studies. From 2001 to 2003 Atsede was the Minister Consular of Ethiopian Embassy in Pretoria, South Africa. She has also served as permanent representative of Ethiopia to the African Union and chargé d'affaires and Minister Counsellor in Dakar, Senegal and other Ethiopian diplomatic missions, including the embassy in Accra, Ghana.

Kidanu was the chairperson of the committee charged with reclaiming Ethiopian property impounded in Eritrea following Eritrea's invasion of Ethiopia; she was also until her recent appointment overseas, a member of the National Task Force on the Illegal Trafficking of Human Persons. In 2011, she gave a speech to the International Organization for Migration. She asserted that the government of Ethiopia took the partnership “very seriously and jointly” and they would work with the IOC to manage migration more effectively.

One of few senior female career diplomats, Atsede has also headed the African Affairs Directorate, European and North American Affairs Directorate and the International Treaties and Agreements Department of the Ministry of Foreign Affairs. She has participated in many notable international negotiations such as the United Nations General Assembly and other forums representing Ethiopia. She is currently serving as the Deputy Head of Mission to the Embassy of Ethiopia in Berlin. In this position, she helped lead an exhibition on Ethiopia at the "Alte Burg" in Germany. She is also serving in the Mission to the UN in New York City, and gave a speech on women's issues to the body in 2009. She has campaigned for women to have a greater role in the socio-economic development process.
