= Tewolde-Medhin Gebre-Medhin =

Ethiopian clergyman, educator and translator

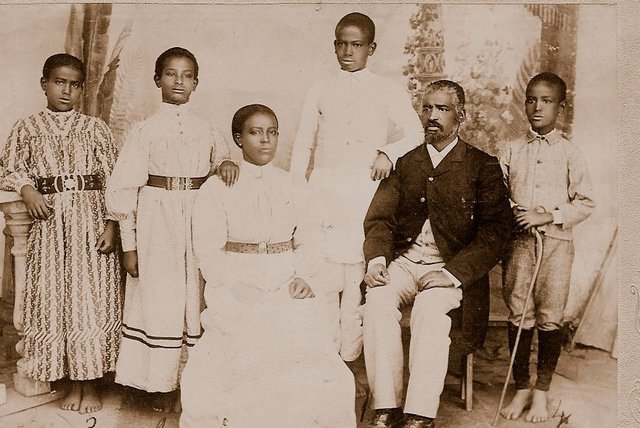
Family picture of Pastor Tewolde-Medhin Gebre-Medhin, 1899

Tewolde-Medhin Gebre-Medhin (1860–1930) was a spiritual scholar, educator, ordained pastor, and translator, originally from the town of Tseazega Eritrea in the Horn of Africa. He was ordained as a deacon in the Ethiopian Orthodox Church in 1872. (By local custom, he is properly referred to as "Täwäldä-Mädhin".) From four generations of priests, Täwäldä-Mädhin's father and uncle were Orthodox priests, but both they and young Täwäldä-Mädhin were greatly changed after contact with a Swedish missionary. In adulthood, Täwäldä-Mädhin maintained that he wanted to work for reform within the Ethiopian Orthodox Church (Arén 1978:182, 340n), though he had been persecuted for being Evangelical.

Beginning in 1874, Täwäldä-Mädhin was educated at Gäläb at a school run by the Swedish Evangelical Mission. There, he and Dawit Amanuel (1862–1944) worked together to translate the New Testament into the Tigre language. Before it was completed, he was sent to Sweden for further study in 1883–1887, where he studied the Bible and Biblical languages, subjects that were later vital for his work in translation. He prepared a Tigre spelling book and a reading book that were published in 1889; that same year the Swedish Mission Press published the first installment of Tewolde-Medhin's translation, the Gospel of Mark (Ullendorff, 1968: 71). He was ordained in Asmara by A. Kolmodin, the first evangelical Eritrean to be ordained on the continent (1909). The entire New Testament in Tigre was published in 1902, a revised version later published in 1934 adopted spelling rules Täwäldä-Mädhin had advocated all along. He later worked with Täwäldä-Mädhin Gäbru (1869–1960) and Dr. Karl Winqvist on the translation of the New Testament into Tigrinya, which was published in 1909, later working on the Old Testament, as well. In addition to his educational and translation work, he also served the churches as a pastor, teacher, and leader, becoming widely known and respected in Eritrea.
