= Adugna Deyas =

Ethiopian football goalkeeper

Personal information
- Full name: Adugna Gurmu Deyas
- Date of birth: 13 July 1983 (age 43)
- Place of birth: Dire Dawa, Ethiopia
- Position: Goalkeeper

Team information
- Current team: Saint-George SA
- Number: 24

Senior career*
Years	Team	Apps	(Gls)
2001–2002	EEPCO	?	(?)
2003–present	Saint-George SA	?	(?)

International career
2004	Ethiopia		
- * Club domestic league appearances and goals as of 1 February 2007

Adugna Gurmu Deyas (Amharic: ዓዱግና ጙርሙ ዸያስ, born 13 July 1983 in Ethiopia) is an Ethiopian football goalkeeper.

== Career ==
Deyas joined Ethiopian champions Saint-George SA in 2003.

Deyas is a member of the Ethiopia national football team, and was part of the Ethiopia squad at the 2001 FIFA World Youth Cup.
