= Fisseha Adugna =

Ethiopian diplomat (born 1955)

Fisseha Adugna (born 27 September 1955) is an Ethiopian diplomat who was the Ethiopian ambassador to the United Kingdom. He served in this post from 8 March 2002 until March 2006. He was succeeded by Berhanu Kebede.

Fisseha was born in Fiche, Shoa in Ethiopia and attended Teferi Mekonnen High School in Addis Ababa. He matriculated to Addis Ababa University and earned a Bachelor's Degree in International Relations. He earned a Master's Degree in Diplomatic Services and International Organisations from the Diplomatic Academy of Vienna, Austria.

Fisseha began his diplomatic career with the Ministry of Foreign Affairs in 1980. He steadily moved up the ranks and eventually was appointed to the Ethiopian Mission to the United States in April 1992. Fisseha served as Deputy Chief of Mission at the Embassy of Ethiopia in Washington, D.C. until December 2000, whereupon he was appointed as Chargé d'Affaires of the Embassy of Ethiopia in London. He was made Ambassador on March 8, 2002.

Fisseha is married and has two children. He speaks Oromiffa, Amharic, English, French and German.
