= Oromo conflict =

Armed civil conflict in Ethiopia

- Part of the Ethiopian Civil War and Ethiopian civil conflict (2018–present)
- The Oromia Region of Ethiopia
| Date | 1973–present (53 years) |
| Location | Oromia, Ethiopia |
| Status | Ongoing; Start of peace talks between government of Ethiopia and the OLA on 25 April 2023; Conflict resumes after peace talks failed in May 2023.; A major OLA faction and the government signed a peace deal on 1 December 2024 and its members started moving into designated camps |

Belligerents
| Ethiopia; Former combatants: Ethiopian Empire (until 1975); Derg (1975–87); PDRE (1987–91); TGE (1991–95) | OLF (until 2018); OLA (independent from OLF since 2018); IFLO (1985–87); EUPF (1993–2012) |

Commanders and leaders
| Taye Atske Selassie; Abiy Ahmed; Abraham Belay; Haile Selassie (until 1975); Mengistu Haile Mariam (1975–1991); Negasso Gidada (1995–2001); Girma Wolde-Giorgis (2001–2013); Mulatu Teshome (2013–2018); Sahle-Work Zewde (2018–2024); Meles Zenawi (1991–2012); Hailemariam Desalegn (2012–2018) | Dawud Ibsa Ayana; Elemo Qiltu †; Ahmad Taqi †; Tadesse Birru †; Waqo Gutu; Jaarraa |

Units involved
| Imperial Ethiopian Army (until 1975); Derg (1975–1991); ENDF (from 1991) | Oromo Liberation Army |

Strength
| 182,500 (2011) | OLF: 13,000 (1982); 14,000 (1991); 10,000–40,000 (1992; likely ~15,000−20,000); 20,000–22,000 (1998) |

Casualties and losses
- 1,600–8,900 killed overall

The Oromo conflict or Oromia conflict is a decades-long armed conflict that began in 1973 between the Oromo Liberation Front (OLF) and the Ethiopian government. The Oromo Liberation Front formed to fight the Ethiopian Empire to liberate the Oromo people and establish an independent state of Oromia. The conflict began in 1973, when Oromo nationalists established the OLF and its armed wing, the Oromo Liberation Army (OLA). These groups formed in response to prejudice against the Oromo people during the Haile Selassie and Derg era, when their language was banned from public administration, courts, church and schools, and the stereotype of Oromo people as a hindrance to expanding Ethiopian national identity.

== Background ==
The Oromo people are an ethnic group who predominantly inhabit Oromia in Ethiopia, along with communities in neighboring Kenya and Somalia. They are the largest ethnic group in Ethiopia and the wider Horn of Africa; according to a 2007 census, they make up about 34.5% of Ethiopia's population, and others estimate that they make up about 40% of the population.

The Oromo remained independent until the last decade of the 19th century, when they were colonised by Abyssinia. Under the rule of Haile Selassie, the Oromo language was banned and speakers were privately and publicly mocked to help the Amhara culture and language dominate the Oromo people.

In 1967, the imperial regime of Haile Selassie outlawed the Mecha and Tulama Self-Help Association (MTSHA), an Oromo social movement, and conducted mass arrests and executions of its members. The group's leader, Colonel General Tadesse Birru, a prominent military officer, was among those arrested. These actions by the regime sparked outrage among the Oromo community, ultimately leading to the formation of the OLF in 1973.

== Timeline ==
=== 1970–1980 ===
In 1974, the Ethiopian military ousted the imperial regime and seized control of the country. The new Derg regime promptly arrested Oromo leaders; subsequently a secret conference attended by Oromo leaders, including Hussein Sora and Elemo Qiltu, formed the OLF. A group of armed Oromo fighters in the Chercher Mountains were adopted as the OLF's armed wing, the OLA. The OLA increased its activities in the Chercher Mountains, prompting the Ethiopian regime to send its military to the region to quell the insurrection.

In June 1974, General Tadesse Birru, an Oromo nationalist who had been arrested by the imperial regime in 1966 along with other high-ranking military officers, escaped from house arrest and joined Oromo rebels led by Hailu Regassa in Shewa. Birru and Regassa were later captured and executed by the Derg regime.

In late August 1974, an OLA unit left their stronghold in the Chercher Mountains and advanced closer to Gelemso, hoping that nearby fully grown crops would hide them from Ethiopian soldiers as they made their way towards nearby towns. Three of the unit's new recruits were unaccustomed to climbing long distances, so they spent the night at the foot of the mountains, while the rest of the soldiers camped at the top.

An OLA soldier sent to retrieve the three recruits discovered that they had been killed by Ethiopian militiamen who had followed the unit to Tiro. A large group of Ethiopian policemen and militiamen surrounded the OLA position in the mountains, and the two opposing groups exchanged gunfire. A group of Ethiopian soldiers led by General Getachew Shibeshi arrived and shelled the stronghold with mortars, killing most of the OLA's members, including Qiltu. The event became known as the Battle of Tiro. Contingents of the OLA continued to fight the regime after the battle and gained a massive influx of recruits and volunteers after the Derg regime executed Birru and Regassa.

In 1976, the OLF established a stronghold in the Chercher Mountains and reorganized itself. A congress created by Oromo leaders revised the 1973 OLF Political Program and issued a new detailed program calling for the "total liberation of the Oromo nation from Ethiopian colonialism". The conference, now known as the Founding Congress, marked the beginning of modern Oromo nationalism.

=== 1980–1990 ===
In the 1980s, the OLF estimated that they had over 10,000 soldiers. They were poorly equipped in comparison to other rebel groups in Ethiopia at the time, such as the Eritrean People's Liberation Front (EPLF) and the Tigrayan People's Liberation Front (TPLF). The OLF also opened an office in Sudan in the 1980s, after its office in Somalia was closed down.

During the 1980s, the government of Ethiopia was accused of using scorched earth tactics, such as burning down entire villages and massacring inhabitants. The OLF also lost several prominent members due to government ambushes and heavy fire; the secretary general of the OLF at the time, Galassa Dilbo, was nearly killed in one such ambush.

=== 1990–2000 ===
In the early 1990s, the Derg began to lose its control over Ethiopia. The OLF failed to maintain strong alliances with the other two big rebel groups at the time; the Eritrean People's Liberation Front (EPLF) and the Tigray People's Liberation Front (TPLF). In 1990, the TPLF created an umbrella organization for several rebel groups in Ethiopia, the Ethiopian People's Revolutionary Democratic Front (EPRDF). The EPRDF's Oromo subordinate, the Oromo People's Democratic Organization (OPDO) was seen as an attempt to replace the OLF.

In 1991, the EPRDF seized power and established a transitional government. The EPRDF and the OLF pledged to work together in the new government; however, they were largely unable to cooperate, as the OLF saw the OPDO as an EPRDF ploy to limit their influence. In 1992, the OLF announced that it was withdrawing from the transitional government because of "harassment and [the] assassinations of its members". In response, the EPRDF sent soldiers to destroy OLA camps. Despite initial victories against the EPRDF, the OLF was eventually overwhelmed by the EPRDF's superior numbers and weaponry, forcing OLA soldiers to use guerrilla warfare instead of traditional tactics. In the late 1990s, most of the OLF's leaders escaped Ethiopia, and the land originally administered by the OLF was seized by the Ethiopian government, led by the EPRDF.

=== 2000–2018 ===
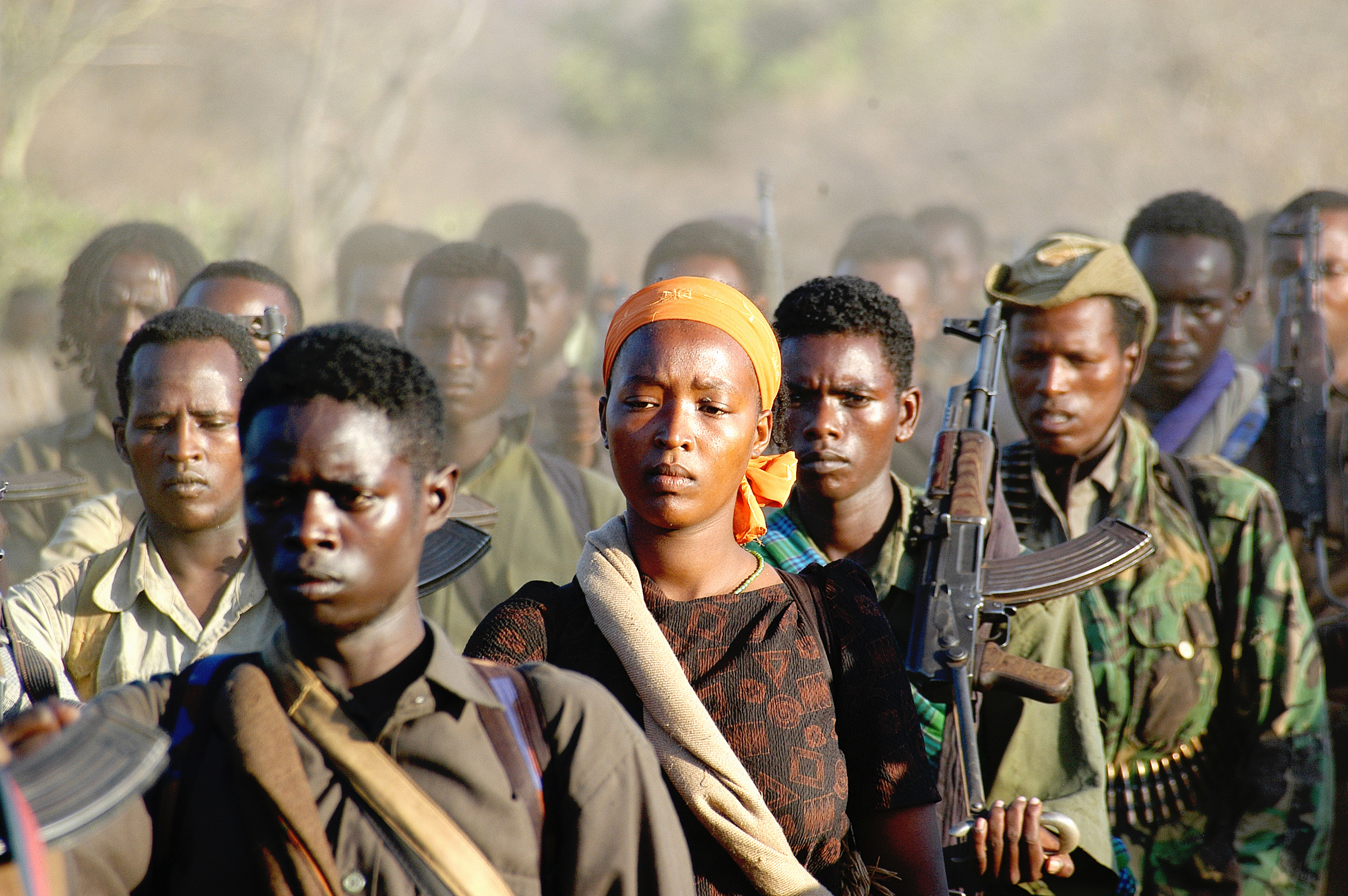
OLF forces retreat into Kenya, 3 February 2006

After the Eritrean–Ethiopian War, the OLF moved its leadership and headquarters to Eritrea. The OLA allegedly began receiving military training and arms from the Eritrean government. On 25 July 2000, OLF and IFLO signed a peace agreement after five days of negotiations, thus ending 20 years of inter-factional fighting. In 2004, the Gambela Region-based Ethiopian Unity Patriots Front (EUPF) rebel group launched forays into Oromia with the help of Eritrea. These raids were limited in scope, however, as the EUPF had no popular support among the Oromo people, despite having some Oromo members.

In 2006, the OLA in southern Oromia retreated into Kenya in an attempt to regroup. That same year, Brigadier General Kemel Gelchu of the Ethiopian military took 100 of his soldiers and defected to the OLF in Eritrea. Despite initially aiding the OLF as leader of its military wing, in 2008, General Kemel Gelchu took matters into his own hands and announced that the OLF would lay down its weapons and abandon its previous goal of seceding Oromia and instead work as a political party to democratize Ethiopia. Along with this announcement, he commanded OLF soldiers in south Oromia to lay down their weapons and surrender to the government.

On 30 May 2015, various media outlets reported that the OLF had attacked a federal police station in the Ethiopian side of Moyale town killing twelve Ethiopian soldiers. This occurred weeks after Ethiopian forces swarmed across the Kenyan border and began abusing the locals of Sololo, looking for OLF troops. These forces later responded to the attack by launching an attack on Moyale District Hospital and killing one guard.

According to Amnesty International, as of 2014, there was sweeping repression in the Oromia Region of Ethiopia. On 19 December 2015, German broadcaster Deutsche Welle reported violent protests in the Oromia region of Ethiopia in which more than 75 students were killed. According to the report, the students were protesting the government's illegal expansion of 2014 Addis Ababa Master Plan

On 2 October 2016, between 55 and 300 festival-goers were massacred at the most sacred and largest event of the Oromo, the Irreecha cultural thanksgiving festival. In just one day, dozens were killed and many more injured. Every year, millions of Oromos, the largest ethnic group in Ethiopia, gather in Bishoftu for this annual celebration. However that year Ethiopian security forces responded to peaceful protests by firing tear gas and live bullets at over two million people surrounded by a lake and cliffs. In the week that followed, angry youth attacked government buildings and private businesses. On 8 October, the government responded with a state of emergency lifted not lifted until August 2017. During the state of emergency, security forces arbitrarily detained over 21,000 people.

=== OLA insurgency (2018–present) ===
In April 2018 the OLF made peace with the Ethiopian government along with several other groups including the Ogaden National Liberation Front and Ginbot 7. The OLF leadership agreed to disarm its soldiers within 15 days of their arrival in Addis Ababa. According to then-OLF leader Ibsa Negewo, the OLF claimed to have 1,305 soldiers in Eritrea and 4,000 in West and South Oromia. The men stationed in Eritrea agreed to disarm but most of those in Oromia refused to do so despite their leaders’ wishes. One leader, Kumsa Diriba, also known as "Jaal Maro", failed to reach a deal with the government and after a falling out with the OLF, he split away from the OLF and formed OLF–Shene, also known as the Oromo Liberation Army (OLA). Security forces promised to crush the group within two weeks but haven't been able to do so even after 5 years of fighting. During the following two years, OLA killed 700 civilians in the East and West Guji Zones according to Haaji Umar Nagessa, a "veteran freedom fighter and tribal leader", who was assassinated by the OLA on 4 April 2020.

==== 2021 ====
In March 2021, the 22nd division of the Eritrean Defence Forces (EDF), already present in the Tigray Region during the Tigray War, was in Oromia Region to fight the OLA, according to Freedom Friday. The 22nd division was led by Haregot Furzun. The OLA insurgency continued through much of 2021. On 31 October, the OLA took control of Kamisee, simultaneously to the Tigray Defense Forces taking control of Kombolcha.

==== Peace agreement ====
The first OLA peace deal was launched in April 2023, mediated by Tanzania, but it ended without success. A second attempt took place in November 2023 in Dar es Salaam, in collaboration with IGAD; however, this negotiation also failed to produce an agreement. On December 1, 2024, an OLA faction led by Jaal Senay Negasa signed a peace deal with Oromia Region President Shimelis Abdisa.
