= Oromo Liberation Front =

Oromo nationalist political party in Ethiopia

Oromo Liberation Front Adda Bilisummaa Oromoo
- Abbreviation: OLF
- Leader: Dawud Ibsa Ayana
- Founded: 1973
- Armed wing: Oromo Liberation Army (1974–2018)
- Ideology: Oromo nationalism; Democracy; Self-determination; Socialism; Ethnic federalism
- Political position: Left-wing
- Colors: Red, Green and Orange
- House of Federation: 0 / 112
- House of Peoples' Representatives: 0 / 547

Party flag

The Oromo Liberation Front (Oromo: Adda Bilisummaa Oromoo, abbreviated: ABO; English abbreviation: OLF) is an Oromo nationalist political party formed in 1973 to promote self-determination and the independence for the Oromo people inhabiting today's Oromia Region and Oromia Zone in the Amhara Region of Ethiopia. The OLF has offices in Addis Ababa, Washington, D.C., and Berlin, from which it operates radio stations that broadcast in Amharic and Oromo.

The OLF is not to be confused with the Oromo Liberation Army, which is the now independent former military wing of the OLF. The OLA split from the OLF following disagreements over disarmament.

== History ==
The Oromo people, an ethnic group native to the Oromia Region of Ethiopia, remained independent until the last quarter of the nineteenth century, when they lost their sovereignty and were conquered by Abyssinia. The Oromos suffered harsh oppression under the imperial rule of Haile Selassie, who was ethnically Oromo and Amhara. Under the Haile Selassie regime, the Oromo language was banned from schools and government. These changes initiated a period of Amhara cultural dominance lasting much of the twentieth century. Both the Haile Selassie and the Derg governments relocated numerous Amhara into southern Ethiopia, where they served in government, courts, churches, and schools, where Oromo texts were eliminated and replaced by Amharic ones. The Abyssinian elites perceived the Oromo identity and language as an obstacle to the expansion of Ethiopian national identity.

In 1967, the regime of Haile Selassie I outlawed the Mecha and Tuluma Self-Help Association (MTSHA) and later instigated a wave of mass arrests and killings of its members and leaders. Prominent military officer and leader of the association Tadesse Birru was also arrested. This reaction by the regime was caused by the popularity of the MTSHA among the Oromo, as well as its links to the Bale Oromo resistance movement.

One of the association's members, Hussein Sora, escaped to Somalia in 1967. He and other Oromo refugees formed a rebel group called the Ethiopian National Liberation Front, of which Sora was named Secretary General. The ENLF soon moved to Yemen and began training members of the Oromo diaspora.

The first attempt by the ENLF to enter the country was directed by Jaarraa Abbaa Gadaa, but it failed when Somali security forces tracked down the militants and arrested them while trying to enter Ethiopia through northern Somalia. The second attempt proved more successful and the second group of rebels made camp in the Chercher Mountains. At this point, the group decided to operate under the name "Oromo" instead of "Ethiopian."

=== Initial formation ===
In 1973, the political situation of the country had changed and the Ethiopian military had ousted the imperial regime and taken control. Leaders and members of the MTSHA, who had escaped arrest, had been operating secretly within the country by stirring up activism through underground newspapers such as "Kena Bektaa" and "The Oromo Voice Against Tyranny". They organized a secret conference which was attended by Hussein Sora, Elemo Qiltu and various other Oromo leaders. It was during this conference that the Oromo Liberation Front was officially formed and its first political program was first written out. The armed Oromo units in the Chercher Mountains were adopted as the military wing of the organization, the Oromo Liberation Army or OLA (Oromo: Waraanna Bilisummaa Oromo or WBO).

The Oromo Liberation Army in the Chercher Mountains was placed under the command of Hassen Ibrahim, more commonly known as Elemo Qiltu. In 1974, the OLA increased its activities in the mountains and caused much alarm amongst the administrators of the region especially when they killed the notorious landowner, Mulatu Tegegn. The military regime of Ethiopia then sent General Getachew Shibeshi to destroy the insurrection. On September 6, 1974, the first Oromo Liberation Army was obliterated by mortar fire in the Battle of Tiro in which they lost both Ahmad Taqi and Elemo Qiltu; only three OLA soldiers survived.

In an attempt to subjugate any further Oromo uprising, the Derg instigated mass arrests and killings in the surrounding urban areas of where the OLA had operated, particularly in the cities of Gelemso, Badessa, Mechara, Boke, and Balbaleti. After the short lived guerrilla war, the OLF become even more disorganized and a few of its leaders moved back to Aden in order to restructure the organization but to no avail.

General Tadesse Birru, who had escaped from prison, continued an armed struggle in the Shewa region of the Oromo nation along with Hailu Regassa. They were eventually captured and executed in 1976 but his OLA contingent continued fighting and gained an influx of recruits after the executions.

=== Official formation ===
By 1976, the Oromo Liberation Army had taken up a stronghold in the Chercher Mountains and this was used as an opportunity to reorganize the Front. A two-day secret conference was organized among Oromo leaders and the attendees hailed from all corners of Oromia and a more broad-based leadership was elected. A few members of the ENLF, who were released from custody in Somalia in 1975 and others who had entered the country on previous occasions, as well as representatives of the underground study cells, individual Oromo nationalist and patriots were members of what is now called the "Founding Congress". The Congress revised the 1973 OLF Political Program and issued a new detailed program. The program called for the "total liberation of the Oromo nation from Ethiopian colonialism". The conference is now known as the Founding Congress and it marked the beginning of modern Oromo nationalism.

Another front was opened by a newly formed Oromo Liberation Army that was initiated in eastern Oromia by farmers. Oromo students and intellectuals in urban areas joined OLA camps by the hundreds in order to offer leadership and educational training. The first battles occurred in the rural areas around Dire Dawa such as Gara Mul'ata.

=== Late 1970s and the 1980s ===
The OLF subsequently spread its activities to western Oromia and elected a new 41-member central committee along with a five-member Supreme Politico Military Command, which comprised Lencho Letta, Muhee Abdo, Baro Tumsa, Magarsaa Barii and Gadaa Gamada. With its structure firmly in place, the OLF began an effective campaign to educate students and the general populace about Oromo nationalism. Its military wing also began capturing land in western Oromia, particularly in Wellega.

Between 1977 and 1978, the war between Somalia and Ethiopia proved to be a double-sided coin to the fortunes of the organization. Abandoned weaponry from both armies allowed more recruits to be armed. On the other hand, the Ethiopian, Somali and Western Somali Liberation Front forces were all against the OLF and tried their utmost to eliminate the organization.

In the 1980s, the OLF opened an office in Sudan after its office in Somalia was closed down. It was also in that time that mass killings and arrests of Oromos began as a government attempt to curb the OLF's growth, which only served to further the OLF's support amongst Oromos.

The Oromo Liberation Army at that point had grown from a few hundred to over 10,000 soldiers. Despite their numbers, the troops were poorly equipped when compared to the other rebel groups which were operating in Ethiopia at the time, namely the Eritrean People's Liberation Front and the Tigrayan People's Liberation Front. The OLA controlled vast areas of land in southern, western and eastern Oromia and offices and military bases were set up in major cities such as Jijiga, Assosa, Dembidollo and Mendi.

It was also in that decade that the organization and the movement lost many prominent figures such as Muhee Abdo, Saartu Yousef, Kebede Demissie, Baro Tumsa, Juuki Barentoo and hundreds more. The military government increased its viciousness against the OLF by burning entire villages, massacring student activists and through mass arrests. The OLF leadership was once almost wiped out during an ambush by government troops in which the OLF Secretary General, Galassa Dilbo, was almost killed.

=== 1990s ===
The military government was on the verge of collapse as three rebel groups were obliterating its rule of the country. The Oromo Liberation Front, the Tigrayan People's Liberation Front and the Eritrean People's Liberation Front had differing alliances with each other, the TPLF and EPLF had a strong alliance and they both had limited coordination's with the OLF. In 1990, the TPLF formed several other ethnic-based political groups from prisoners it had released and put them all under an umbrella organization called the Ethiopian People's Revolutionary Democratic Front. The Oromo group in the EPRDF was the Oromo People's Democratic Organization and its creation was seen as an attempt to undermine the OLF.

The EPRDF, after destroying government control in Tigray and the Amhara region, proceeded to take Nekemte, a city in Oromia. In response, the Oromo Liberation Front said in a broadcast on the Radio Voice of Oromo Liberation (Frankfurt am Main) on 15 April 1991: "The OLF strongly opposes the phrase: liberating Wellega or the Oromo nation. It is false for any alien force to say that it will liberate the Oromo nation."

The three rebel groups along with government representatives were to meet in the London Conference in May 1991 but the government representatives withdrew after hearing news that their President, Mengistu Hailemariam, had escaped to Zimbabwe. In this meeting, it was decided that the EPLF would hold a referendum amongst Eritreans in order to secede from the rest of the country. The EPRDF insisted that the OLF should not ask to secede from the country due to the Oromia Region's strategic position in the country. Instead, it was decided that a transitional government compromising of the OLF, EPRDF and various other rebel groups would be created.

Despite the tension, the two rebel groups worked together to capture the capital of Ethiopia, Addis Ababa, and bring down the remaining government forces. A national conference was convened and a transitional government was set up with the OLF having the second highest number of seats to the EPRDF.

The two groups were, however, unable to work together largely because the OLF could not handle the OPDO, believing it to be an EPRDF ploy to limit the OLF's power and influence. Eventually, skirmishes began to break out between their military wings even though both groups had agreed to encamp their forces until they could be properly transitioned into a national army. In 1992, the OLF announced that it was withdrawing from the government because of "harassment and assassinations of its members". In response, the EPRDF sent raiding parties to the encampment zones of OLA soldiers. The ensuing arrests and killings greatly reduced the Oromo Liberation Front's fighting power. Twenty thousand of its fighters were immediately arrested and thousands were killed in the raids on the camps. Some OLF soldiers were purposely kept out of camps by their commanders due to suspicion and mistrust of the EPRDF and those groups began to engage the EPRDF in battle. Despite initial victories, the EPRDF's superiority in numbers and weaponry eventually forced the OLF troops to wage a guerilla war instead.

In the late 1990s, much of the OLF leadership escaped the country and the land controlled and administered by the OLF was given to the EPRDF. Thousands of civilians were arrested, killed and chased out of the country for suspicion of supporting or being OLF members. The EPRDF's success at quickly eliminating the OLF's military capability meant that the OLA could only wage a low-key struggle.

=== 2000s ===
After the Eritrean–Ethiopian War, much of its leadership moved to Eritrea and its military wing began to get training and support from the Eritrean government. Between 2000 and 2005, the OLF membership fluctuated due to government crackdowns on Oromo student activism and general dissent. Despite this, the OLF was only further weakened when a faction broke away due to disagreements with the Secretary General Dawud Ibsa. The fighting between these two factions, particularly in the Borana region of Oromia greatly weakened the OLF's ability to wage a war against the government.

In 2006, the OLA in southern Oromia retreated into Kenya in an attempt to regroup. That same year, Brigadier General Kemel Gelchu of the Ethiopian military took 100 of his soldiers and joined the OLF in Eritrea. Despite initially aiding the OLF as leader of its military wing, in 2008, General Kemel Gelchu took matters into his own hands and announced that the OLF would lay down its weapons and abandon its previous goal of seceding Oromia and instead work as a political party to democratize Ethiopia. Along with this announcement, he commanded OLF soldiers in south Oromia to lay down their weapons and surrender to the government. The central leadership of the OLF eventually announced that Kemel Gelchu had been removed from office but not before nearly half of the southern army of the OLF had surrendered. Kemel Gelchu and his troops in Eritrea formed their own OLF faction and allied themselves with Ginbot 7.

=== 2010s ===
On 20 November 2012, the main OLF faction and the faction that had broken away in the early 2000s announced reunification.

On 30 May 2015, various media outlets reported that the OLF had attacked a federal police station in the Ethiopian side of Moyale town killing 12 Ethiopian soldiers. This occurred weeks after Ethiopian forces swarmed across the Kenyan border and began abusing locals of Sololo town looking for OLF troops. These forces later responded to the attack by launching an attack Moyale District Hospital and killing one guard.

On 18 March 2018, OLA/OLF troops in western Oromia attacked two Ethiopian military vehicles, killing more than 30 soldiers and capturing the rest.

==== Peace and split of Oromo Liberation Army (OLA) from OLF ====
In August 2018, a peace agreement was forged between the Ethiopian government and the OLF, in principle ending the 45-year Oromo conflict.

The OLA was not satisfied with the peace negotiations, and split from the OLF. The OLA continued carrying out armed attacks. Nagessa Dube, writing in Ethiopia Insight, described the split as "tactical", and stated that, as of August 2020, the OLA appeared to consist of two administratively separate groups in the south and west.

On 2 November 2020, Amnesty International reported that 54 people – mostly Amhara women and children and elderly people – were killed in the village of Gawa Qanqa, Ethiopia. The government blamed OLA, which denied responsibility. On June 29, Al Jazeera reported that Oromo singer and activist Hachalu Hundessa was killed; the OLF accused prime minister Abiy Ahmed and the federal government.

Overall, from April 2018 to April 2020, the OLA killed 700 civilians according to veteran freedom fighter, Haaji Umar Nagessa, himself was assassinated by the OLA on 4 April 2020.

=== 2020s ===
On 21 February 2020, militants opened fire on Solomon Tadesse, the Burayu police chief, in Burayu, Oromia. Tadesse was killed and 3 people more, including another police commander, were injured in the attack. No group claimed responsibility for the incident, but the Oromo Liberation Front and the Abu Torbe group were the principal suspects. In 2021 during the Tigray War, a division of the EDF left Tigray Region and arrived in Oromia Region to fight against the OLA, according to Freedom Friday.

On 11 August 2021, the OLA leader Kumsa Diriba announced that the group had formed an alliance with Tigray People's Liberation Front (TPLF) and that there were plans among opposition groups to establish a "grand coalition" against Abiy Ahmed.

== Alleged terrorism ==
The Kenyan government alleged OLF involvement in the Wagalla massacre. However, at the time, the government denied that OLF rebels were operating inside Kenya. Major Madoka said the OLF issue needed to be addressed, as it had the potential to disrupt peace in the region. Several thousands of herds of livestock were estimated stolen, as well as 52 girls abducted. Most of this led to a tougher stance by the Kenyan government against the OLF. A quote from the BBC article states "the fighting was sparked when Degodia tribesmen allowed their cattle to graze on Borana land without asking permission. Survivors of the attack blamed Kenyans and Oromos from neighbouring Ethiopia. However, at the time the government denied that OLF rebels were operating inside Kenya.". In fact, a report compiled by a committee stated that the feuding between the two tribes existed before the OLF began operating in the area. Kenyan authorities formally asked Ethiopia to remove their troops from Kenya indicative of Ethiopian involvement in facilitating violence between communities

In December 1991, it was reported that armed Oromos had attacked Amhara settlers in the Arsi Zone. According to a Human Rights Watch report, one hundred fifty-four Christians, mainly Amharas, were killed in Arba Guugu. The report stated that the massacre was a result of the exploitation of the animosity between Oromo and Amharas in that area by the previous government. The report went on to say that "OLF cadres instigated repeated attacks on Amhara settlers. Villages were burned and civilians were killed." According to University of Minnesota Human Rights summary reports, the OLF admitted that its supporters might have carried out the massacre and "killed about 150 Amharas" in the area, but it stated that the OLF had not planned or condoned the incidence.

== International links ==
According to BBC reports dating as far back as 1999, OLF, along with other anti-Ethiopian elements operating in Ethiopia and Somalia, were receiving assistance from Eritrea as well as helping Eritrea during the Ethiopia–Eritrea 1998–2002 war. In April 1998, OLF held a congress in Mogadishu electing a more militant leadership. Eritrea also supported the Oromo fighters with a ship load of arms and additional 1,500 Oromo fighters being shipped from Eritrea to the south Somalia OLF training center of Qorioli. In July 1999, OLF was stationed at the South Shabelle region and armed by Eritrea in order to fight Ethiopia during the border war. While Eritrea engaged Ethiopia in a border war, the OLA significantly increased their activities in southern Ethiopia. During Ethiopia's war against Eritrea in 1998, the OLF was noted increasing its radio propaganda outreach to Oromos in Ethiopia.

The OLF has offices in Washington, D.C. and Berlin and is a member of the Unrepresented Nations and Peoples Organization. It operates a shortwave radio station, SBO (Sagalee Bilisummaa Oromoo) or VOL (Voice of Oromo Liberation), in Berlin. VOL radio transmits in Afaan Oromo as well as in Amharic.

== Ideological base ==
The fundamental objective of the Oromo Liberation Movement is to gain self-determination for the Oromo people. While self-determination for the Oromo people has been the main objective of OLF, the members and leaders of the party have not formed a consensus whether the exercising of self-determination by the Oromo people will be in the form of an independent Oromia, or as part of a democratic Ethiopia. But recently, it has stated that its goals is to form, if possible, a political union with other nations on the basis of equality, respect for mutual interests and the principle of voluntary associations. OLF had played a major role in the formation of the Transitional Government in 1991 following the fall of the Derg regime. However, OLF left the transitional government, alleging that its members were being intimidated, jailed, and killed in many part of Oromia. Since then OLF has been engaged in low-scale protracted armed struggle against the Ethiopian government. The OLF believes the Oromo people still are being denied their fundamental rights. According to OLF, Ethiopian colonialism has been led by Abyssinian Emperors which has been chiefly the Amhara ruling class until it was replaced by a Tigrayan-led government in the early 1990s. The OLF believes that the change in government from the Derg regime in 1991 does not enable the Oromo people and others to realize their fundamental rights.

In January 2012, a press release announced that the OLF would no longer seek secession from Ethiopia. Instead, the group announced it would pursue unity and freedom, and work with other political groups. However, a subsequent statement appearing on the OLF website claimed that an unauthorized splinter group, which did not represent the views of the OLF, had made the announcement.

== Policies ==
=== Resolutions ===
OLF claims that the root cause of political problems in Ethiopia is the policy of oppression by the former Imperial state of Ethiopia and refusal by the state to respect the rights of oppressed peoples to self-determination. The current Ethiopian government recognizes the right of self-determination of all states in its constitution, but it is accused of placing limitations imposed on the exercise of that right. OLF believes that there is an imperial domination that must be brought to an end in order to bring genuine peace and stability. Thus there is currently a policy of shelving political problems which must cease. The OLF says that it is ready to contribute towards any meaningful effort to reach at a comprehensive settlement to bring peace to all peoples. In the view of the Ethiopian People's Revolutionary Democratic Front (EPRDF) another issue with the OLF movement has been the movement's treatment of Oromos who don't support OLF's ideologies. This is part of the reason the EPRDF helped to form an organization called the Oromo Peoples' Democratic Organization. OLF has stated that they do not resent Oromos for being members of the OPDO.

== Controversy ==
=== Colonial claims ===
The Oromo recount a long history of grievance which casts them as colonial subjects violently displaced from their land and alienated from their culture. Beginning from the late 18th and early 19th centuries, the adjacent Amhara community engaged in constant voracious attacks and raiding expeditions against the surrounding Oromo nation. In 1886, the town, then known as Finfinne, was renamed to Addis Ababa by Menelik II as the capital of the Ethiopian Empire.

There has also been criticism of the terminology the OLF uses; since its formation, the OLF has used the terminology "Abyssinian colonialism" to describe the alleged colonization of ethnic Oromos by Amharas during the 1880s conquests by Emperor Menelik II. However, both Oromos and Amhara Ethiopians alike have disagreed on such strict use of the word "Abyssinians" as exclusively meaning Amhara Ethiopians, because Oromo conquests. One particular example used by Ethiopianist Oromos, like Dr. Merera Gudina, against OLF is the historical accounts on Oromo rule of Ethiopia in the 1700s, including the Yejju Oromos "controlling the imperial seat at Gonder for about eighty years." Ethiopianists claim that since Oromos were citizens of Abyssinia for several centuries (both as peasants and in its leadership), Abyssinia itself is made up of many citizens. Thus northern Oromos were Abyssinians, long before Emperor Menelik was born to lead the alleged "Abyssinian conquest of Oromos." Therefore, since an ethnic group cannot colonize itself, both the incorrect use of the word "Abyssinia" and the claim of "colonization of Oromo" terminology has been disputed by Ethiopianists.

=== Development ===
Another argument given by critics of OLF is its impact on the development of Ethiopia. Most critics of OLF imply that various development projects in southern Ethiopia have been suppressed due to the war waged by the OLA in those regions. In fact, various Oromo elders, Gaada leaders, Oromo religious head persons and Oromo political leaders living in Ethiopia have collectively denounced the destabilizing role of OLF in Oromia state including. Groups allied to the OLF, such as the ONLF, have also been accused of stopping development plans in the Ogaden Region of Ethiopia including violence against formation of educational facilities and the work of oil firms like the Chinese ZPEB and Malaysian oil firm Petronas. OLF also admitted that it has attacked economic centers in Ethiopia as well as transport routes.

The Ethiopian government's spokesperson and former President of Ethiopia, Negasso Gidada, was opposed to the OLF. In 2002, after OLF rebels attacked the Tigray Hotel in Addis Ababa, killing many civilians and destroying property, Negasso stated that "such terrorist acts should not be committed especially in the name of Oromos". He said there is no need for an armed struggle when there are alternative peaceful political ones. He stated "terrorist acts perpetrated against innocent civilians by individuals and groups under the guise to liberate Oromia were abominable crimes and should be condemned in the strongest possible terms. ... Whoever commits such barbaric acts of terror in the name of liberation struggle should not be tolerated. ... The killing of innocent civilians and destroying their properties couldn't be justified by any standard. ... I am of the view that a democratic unity on the basis of justice and equality would be of much benefit to the people of Oromia."

== Response to criticism ==
Criticism of the OLF and its ideology has been routinely countered by the organization and many Oromo intellectuals as being Ethiopian propaganda designed to delegitimize the movement. Ethiopians, mainly from the Amhara ethnic group, have termed Oromo nationalism and self-awareness as counter to the Ethiopian state. As a result, Oromo people and organizations that associated themselves with Oromos were targeted as anti-unity and subject to oppression. The OLF was created as a defence against this type of targeted subjugation of the Oromo people.

On the issue of Ethiopian colonialism, it is noted that Emperor Menelik II officially formed the Ethiopian Empire in 1888 by declaring that all conquered land belonged to the Emperor. After doing so, the Emperor allocated Amhara landlords over the conquered southern lands (including Oromia). In this system, these landlords promoted the systematic suppression and destruction of all elements of Oromo culture while Amhara culture, language and religion was imposed on the conquered Oromo people.

The Somali role is complex as on one hand you have the WSLF fighting for independence like Oromo. On the other hand, you have a radicalized opposition to Horn of Africa. In the middle of these groups were former Somali President Siad Barre. President Siad Barre's objective was to liberate all Somalis under 1 unified state because the Somali people speak 1 language, follow 1 religion, share 1 culture. In his quest, President Siad Barre captured former OLF commanders Barisoo Wabee (Magarsaa Barii), Gadaa Gammadaa (Damisee Tacaanee), Abbaa Xiiqii (Abboomaa Mitikku), Dori Bari (Yigazu Banti), Falmataa /Umar/Caccabsaa, Faafam Dooyyoo, Irra’anaa Qacalee (Obbo Dhinsaa), Dhadacha Boroo, Daddacha Muldhataa, and Marii Galaa.

Anti-Oromo campaign reaches beyond Ethiopian boundaries by Amhara and Tigray alike. Oromo refugees in Djibouti, Kenya, Somalia and South Sudan have been deported back into Ethiopia and even put into labor camps. One such event was the deportation of UNHCR registered refugee, Tesfahun Chemeda, who was deported back to Ethiopia by Kenyan authorities in 2007 and later died in an Ethiopian prison on 24 August 2013 while serving a life sentence.

In Yemen, Ethiopian agents are suspected in the 20 December 2008 murder of Oromo Refugee Association leader Ahmed Ibrahim Rore. The human rights report details violence towards Oromo refugees, including rape. It also raises concerns over why UNHCR Yemen banned Oromo songs at culture shows. Oromo in Yemen provided a letter detailing their suffering in Oromo.

Research in the United States has corroborated claims of torture, rape and extrajudicial killing of mainly Oromo, Somali, Anuak, Sidama, and many other ethnicities. Amhara and Tigray opposition have also been victims of torture. In EPRDF attempts to counterattack their claims, OLF is often targeted as the cause of torture or that were rightfully victims. Similarly, the Ogaden opposition group ONLF was also blamed for torture and human rights violations by Ethiopian authorities, which was addressed in a letter from United States Senators to Prime Minister Meles Zenawi.

== See also ==
- 2015–16 Oromo protests
- Oromo conflict
- Oromo Federalist Congress
- Union of Oromo Students in Europe
