= Galamso =

Town in Oromia Region, Ethiopia

Galamso Galamso (Oromo)
- Town
- Location within Ethiopia
- Coordinates: 8°49′N 40°31′E
- Country: Ethiopia
- Region: Oromia
- Zone: West Hararghe
- Woreda: Gelemso

Population (2015 census)
  - Total: 241,200
- Time zone: UTC+3 (EAT)

Galamso (also spelled Gelemso, and in Oromo Galamsoo), is a town in West Haraghe of Oromia Region, Ethiopia, Gelemso is located in eastern Ethiopian and is far from country capital by 301 km and second way 413 km in the western periphery of the highly networked mountain chain referred to by the natives as Fugug and by geographers as the Ahmar Mountains. Most people say that it is the city of love locally [Biyyaa Jaalala]. Gelemso on 2013 EC became separate woreda in the West Hararghe Zone of the Oromia Regional State, it has a latitude and longitude of 8°49′N 40°31′E. Gelemso is the origin of a variety of Jimaa called by the same name (Gelemso).

== Etymology ==
Oral history says the name Galamso came from the Oromo phrase Galma Usso, meaning the Hall of Usso or House of Usso, a mosque named for a man who came to preach Islam to the Ittu Oromos in the 13th century, called by his followers Aw Seid, and by the Oromos with his given name Usso after he was made ilma gossa or the adopted son of the Warra Qallu clan of the Ittu Oromo . As galma usually refers to the worship house under the traditional (Waqefanna) religion of the Oromos, we may wonder why the mosque was called so. The Oromo elders explain the case as follows.

The Ittu Oromo who are usually mentioned as the native Oromo group of the Chercher highlands, says Aw Seid was the first person to start an Islamization campaign in their land. His real name was Seid Ali and according to the oral history of the Ittu Oromo, he was a Sharif (i.e. descendant of Muhammad) It was in latter periods that his followers who believed in his sainthood added a prefix Aw to his name, in the manner of the Harari and the Somali who call their saints and national heroes so. (Aw meaning father in Harari language, and male saints are usually called with this title.). Since then, Seid Ali has been called Aw Seid.

Local history tellers say that in order to achieve his target, Aw Seid had to seek a means that enables him live in the land of the Oromos with full citizenship rights, which could be accessed under the tradition of the Oromo people at that time. Accordingly, he became ilma gosa or the adopted son of the Warra Qallu sub-group within the Ittu Oromo division of the Eastern Oromo, and on his adoption ceremony, the Oromos named him Usso.

When Aw Seid built his mosque in the southern part of the current site of Galamso town, the Oromo started to call it galma Usso. Here, as elders say, galma stands to notify the spiritual significance of the newly built structure, (even though galma originally refers to the worshiping house of the traditional Oromo religion, the Oromos used to call the worshiping house of any faith by this name) and Usso denotes the owner of the house (in this case Aw Seid). The name Galma Usso was introduced in this way, and in the long period of time, it evolved to Galamso.

This story is not documented, while the Islamization effort of Aw Seid has been discussed by different scholars. However, as the name Galamso can never be found at any other place in the Oromo lands (in the whole of Ethiopia and the world either), and as it has no exact meaning in Oromo or any other language, it might be sound to conclude the ancient Galma Usso gave rise to the current Galamso, the name of the town.

== Basic statistics ==
Based on figures from the Central Statistical Agency, the result of the third Ethiopian census shows that Galamso has total population of 210,000 of which 113,003 are male and 107,481 are female. . However, this report is unacceptable to a number of people and organizations, including authorities in the departments of the district and zonal administrations. People who refuse the report demonstrate their argument simply by the sex ratio of the population (19 males/15 females) . which can not express the reality of the town. On the other hand, multiple inconsistencies of the report may induce one to reject its conclusion For example, the report says that the town of Mieso has a population of 13,339, exceeded by Galamso only with 3000 souls. On the other hand, Hirna town, which is twice as large as Mieso has only 11,650, something difficult to believe.

Free viewers say that the census has defects, and the Ethiopian government admitted that. But the quest for the true figure of the population of Galamso and multiple other factors remained unanswered.

With regard to the religious affiliations, it is witnessed by some that most of the residents of the town (around 70%) are Muslims. And Orthodox Christianity is the second significant religious domination (about 25%). Oromo is the native and the dominant ethnic group in Gelemso and the surrounding areas. Amhara is the second largest ethnicity with persons from different Gurage subgroups at the third level. And a few others are persons of Somali, Argoba and Harari ethnicities. .

== Language ==
The Oromo tongue, called by the natives Oromo, is a principal language in the town. Amharic is also widely spoken in the town. From among the languages of international significance, in Galamso town, it is Arabic that has due benefits for communication purposes. It is said that some 40 years ago, Arabic was the language of commerce in the town, a custom survived to this date.

== Customs ==
Here are some important notes on social and commercial customary features of the town.

- Tuesday is the principal market day in Galamso. There are two open market places in the town. One of them is called by the natives Magaalaa Salaasaa, meaning Tuesday's Market, it is where most of the trading activities of the principal market day takes place. The other one is called Magaalaa Qobbo and it is functional throughout the week. The cattle market, which is found near Qabri Lukku, is open only on the principal market day (Tuesday). Females dominate the business in the two open markets. The cattle market, however, is totally run by males. The town is one of the primary suppliers of the humped bull, popularly known as Harar Sangaa (Harar Bull).
- The Afan Oromo spoken in the town is the Eastern Oromo dialect. But the natives of the town and the surrounding areas of Chercher highlands retain some peculiar usages. For example, coins are usually called niiraa, (from Italian lira), and its counting vary by successive units of two. For example, at Gelemso, the Ethiopian five cents coin is called niira lama (two lira), the ten cents called niiraa afur (four lira), and 20 cents called nira saddeet (eight lira). On the other hand, the Ethiopian birr is called qarshii and the ten birr note is known as bawandii (from English pound).
- The residents dine three times a day. The breakfast is called fatara (from Arabic futuur), the lunch is known as either subaata or qadaa (from Arabic ghada) and the dinner is called dhiheena, hirbaata, or hiraata (from Harari hiraat). The meals include items of traditional Oromo styles like marqaa (porridge), shumoo, affeellama, qiitaa, etc... dishes of the Arabian origin like mulawwah, fatiiraa, haniid, and the traditional Harari dish called hulbat marakh.

The residents who belong to the Amhara nation have the same food preparation style as that of the Amhara people who reside elsewhere in Ethiopia. However, they also share the customs of the Oromos in a number of cases. For example, the Arabian spread bread called mulawwah and the Harari's hulbat marakh is experienced by most of the Amharas too.

- Houses of the town are usually built with at least two rooms. One of these, known as deera, is a room that serves as a bed room and it is where the family keeps its most valuable materials. The other room is of big size where guests are welcomed, and important ceremonies are undertaken. Inside this room, a big sized mud-built raised platform, which serves as seat and called dinqa or madaba, is found with Persian and Arabian rugs spread on it.

Kitchens are usually located outside the main house and called alawaadaa (from the Oromo phrase alatti waaddaa, roast a meet outside a house).

- Another most common custom in the town, which remained a noted figure to this day, is that all male residents are nicknamed. A boy is given a nickname by his friends when he is in early teens. He remains with it whether he likes it or not. But when becomes closer to the 40s, his formal name started to be used again.
- Eid al Fitr and Eid Al Adha are the two Islamic festivals celebrated with high honors in Gelemso. The remarkable event associated with them is the children's songs at the epoch nights of these festivals. The children also require their parents to buy eid cloths. The festivals are usually accompanied by private ceremonies.

Another important festival of Islamic origin is Ashura, which is held in the 10th day of the Muharram month of the Hijra calendar. The children's song that is sung on the night before Ashura day known as Ishaatoo, together with their gourd smashing march, remains one of the classic customs of early Islam of Eastern Ethiopia (It is not known elsewhere apart from East Ethiopia).

The Christian population usually celebrates Epiphany (called Timket in Amharic) with great honor than other Christian festivals. Its annual first takes place on the bank of Aw Seid River 1 km away from the town (in the southern direction).

- Milad Al Nabi or Mawlid is the most notable festival celebrated in mass. The main festival lasts for 3 consecutive days, and it is held chiefly at the Hadra of Sheikh Omar (See below). Professor Braukamper witnessed that when he visited the Hadra in 1973, the attendants of the feast number in 10,000s.
- Khat is chewed in the town by multiple people of different age groups. A variety of superior quality of khat is called qarti and it originates mostly around a rural zone called Chaffe Afanani. Other varieties are known by such names as urata, qudaa, chabbbala, tachero, walaha etc...

== Locations of interest ==
Locations of interest around Gelemso include the followings.

=== Natural wonders ===
- Karra Torban Gelemso or the Seven Natural Gates of Gelemso: in ancient times, the town is said to have seven natural gates called with different names. Most of those ancient names are still on use. The seven gates are ፡
  - Karra Bantii / also called Karra Qoree (the gate of Benti/Kore)- found in the northern direction.
  - Karra Bubbee (the gate of Bube): found in the north-western direction
  - Karra Gobeensaa /also called Karra Hardiim/(the gate of the Bamboo forest/Hardim)-found in the western direction.
  - Karra Beeraa or Karra Balballeettii (the gate of the Women/Belbeleti): found in the south-west direction.
  - Karra Cifraa or Karra Sheekh Husseen (the gate of the Army/ Sheikh Hussein)-found in the southern direction
  - Karra Weenne or Karra Bookee (the gate of Wene/Boke)- found in the south-east direction
  - Karra Caffee (the gate of Chaffee): found in the north east direction.
- Haroo Carcar (Lake of the Cherecher): 10 km east of Gelemso, a lake that varies in its area coverage from time to time. Currently, it is the largest natural lake in eastern Ethiopia (assumed this rank when Lake Haramaya disappeared few years ago). The lake will become as large as 4 km with a breadth of 2 km at its peak. But some times it is mistaken for another temporal lake which appears at its vicinity during heavy rainfall season. This latter body of water is called by the peasants Sal Malee meaning a place where everybody washes his body without being shy (of being seen naked by others).
- Natural Caves: The natural caves around Gelemso have become important sites of geological and anthropological studies. The most famous three — named Hachare-Aynage, Rukiessa and Barro — are located near Mechara town, 40 km south of Gelemso. The first study of them was undertaken in 1996 by a team from University of Huddersfield.
- Dindin Forest and Wild Life Sanctuary : found 35 km west of Gelemso. It is one of the properly protected forest areas in Ethiopia, and extends to the Arba Gugu mountains of northern Arsi. Currently, the forest is a home of multiple species of animals, including the endemic Mountain Nyala.

=== Places of archeological importance ===
- Corooraa/Chorora: an archeological site 40 km west of Gelemso, where Chororapithecus, the 10 million years old fossils of a primate family (ape) were found in 2007. According to Nature Journal, these are the first fossils of a large-bodied Miocene ape from the African continent north of Kenya.

When the fossils were excavated, the news media (including Nature Journal) reported the place wrongly Chorora Formation at the southern margin of the Afar rift. Choroora is of course in the southeast part of the Rift Valley. The exact location of Chorora, however, is the east section of Anchar woreda of West Harerghe zone, on 40 km distance from Gelemso.

=== Places referred as ancient settlements ===
- Qurquraa: a villages referred by Oromo elders as a long existing settlement area since ancient times. This notion may induce us to identify it as a place repeatedly mentioned by the same name (Qurquraa) in the famous book known as Al Futuhul Habash, (the Conquest of Abyssinia),

a chronicle of the brilliant campaigns of Imam Ahmad ibn Ibrihim al-Ghazi whom the Ethiopian writers call Ahmad Gragn, which was written by the eyewitness of the conquests in the 16th century. This village is found about 30 km away from Gelemso (in the western direction) near to a small town called Hardim.

- Abboonah: another village (a market area) referred by locals as a long standing settlement. Since the village is commonly called by the natives with a prefix Daro (saying Daro Abonaah), this one also might be identical to a town of the Dawaro Sultanate that was mentioned in Al Futuhul Habash by the same name.

The village (a small market of about 1000 residents) is about 60 km to the south of Gelemso. In the 1980s, the Dergue government had established a strong military base there in order to watch the nearby movements of OLF.

- Professor Mohammed Hassen also notes another village called by the name Qunburah in Al Futuhul Habash

which is a commonly known name in Oromo nomenclature. However, among multiple places of the Chercher highlands called by the name Qunburah, the Oromo elders do not consider any one as a long standing. But this does not mean there was no place who had this name in ancient times. In fact, one of the places called Qunburah in Chercher highlands is believed to be the offshoot of the ancient Qunburah of Al Futhul Habash. Therefore, a search for that place should continue.

- Harala Ruins: around Gelemso, we can find ruins of the ancient buildings of the legendary people of Harala, whom the Oromos narrate as people of great length, extra ordinary strength and superior wealth, but devastated by hunger, epidemic and volcanic eruption because of their extravagance and disbelief.

Today, as Professor Urlich Braukamper had described precisely in his book, the remnants of the stone built necropolis, store pits, houses and mosques of the ancient Harala people are observable in all of the Hararghe highlands. Their mysterious legends reach as far as Karayu in the west and Jijjiga in the east.

=== Places of cultural importance ===
- Oda Bultum: one of the five Oda or traditional meeting places where the Oromo used to meet to end one luba or 8-year period of the Gadaa system and begin a new one. It is 25 km to the east of Gelemso.
- Halaya Buchuro: a deep gorge where the Oromos in ancient times used to throw and execute (into the chasm) criminals who were found guilty of intentional killing (of innocent people).

=== Places noted for Islamic history and culture ===
- Sheikh Omar Mosque and Sufi Compound: found at the heart of Gelemso. The mosque is to the west of a Sufi compound called Hadra which hosts the celebration of the birth day of Muhammad (Mawlid), making the town one of the main places in Ethiopia marked with such a festive. The Hadra has multiple quarters of different uses, with Beytul Hadra (the house of presence) as a focus. The compound of Hadra is also a home of a big mausoleum in which the tomb of Sheikh Omar (the founder of Hadra) is found.
- Aw-Seid Shrine which is traditionally identified with the ancient Galma Usso, of which the name Gelemso was derived. There is no surviving remnant of the 13th-century mosque by now. The current shrine dates only from the late 19th century.
- Aw-Sherif Hill: where, according to oral history, the Muslim saint Aw-Sherif had lived some 300 years ago.
- The Mosque of Sheikh Ali Jami: located 10 km east of Gelemso, where a saint Sheikh Ali had lived and preached Islam after he returned from the city of Harar where he attended his higher education. His mosque is encircled by a galma and a mausoleum that contains his tomb.

=== Important Christian sites ===
- Medihane Alem Church: an Orthodox Christian Church aged about 60 years.
- Saint Michael Catholic Church: built by the Italian colonists in the late 1930s. It is the tallest man-made erection in the town, which is visible as far as 30 km away due its strategic position, and commonly called Mana Dheeraa meaning the tallest house. It had served as a church, then as prison, and now it hosts a primary school.

== Notable people from Gelemso ==
- Sheikh Ali Jami Guutoo: - commonly called Qallicha by the Oromos, not only for his origin from Warra Qallu Oromo clan, but also for his high priesthood in the Chercher plateau. His descendants are still called Qalicha or Qalittii: meaning the respected one (Qallitti is for female), It is said that the first man to preach Islam peacefully and openly (without any sanction) in the land of Chercher was this Sheikh Ali Jami, so that he became one of the key figures in the Islamization of the Ittu Oromo. Sheikh Ali is considered a great saint and most of the people of the Chercher highlands usually refer to him as Aw Ali.
- Sheikh Umar Aliye: popularly known as Gelemsiyyi. He was another key figure in the Islamization of the Ittu Oromo and a father of Mohammed Zakir Meyra and a number of other heroes and scholars. Perhaps, he is the most widely known scholar, activist and important Islam figure in the region. In fact, he is well known for his dedication for Islam and its teaching throughout the country. He is also the most noted figure in the transmission of the Qadiriyyah Sufi brother-hood (Tariqa), which he introduced to the Harar Oromos with Sheikh Mohammed Harar, his close friend with whom he returned from Wallo after the completion of higher education.
- Ahmad Taqi Sheikh Mohammed Rashid (well known as Hundee) (1942? – September 6, 1974): He was an Oromo nationalist known with his comrade Elemo Kiltu as the first true fighters since they launched the first armed struggle for the Oromo causes under an organization that bears the name of their people (i.e. Oromo). They died together on September 5/1974 at the historic Battle of Tiro and now honored as martyrs by the three major Oromo political organizations; OLF, OPDO and IFLO. Hundee the hero immortalized by Ali Birra's songs.
- Umar Bakkalcha (1953? - 1980) was one of the early Oromo nationalists and martyrs well-remembered in the Chercher highlands of Harerghe especially for the heroic speeches he made at his death spot. His name had been Umar Sheikh Mohammed Rabi, but the people usually refer to him as “Umar Bakkalcha” or simply “Bakkalcha” (the downfall star). Bakkalcha was enlightened in the Oromo National struggle from the very beginning. He had a good understanding of the quests of the Oromo causes far before a number of people. However, the most brainstorming incident that took him to decide giving up all of his belongings for the Oromo causes was the heroic death of the well known Oromo patriots and guerilla leaders called Elemo Killtu (Hassen Ibrahim) and Hundee (or Ahmad Taqi Sheikh Muhammed Rashid).
- Sheikh Mohammed Rashad Abdulle a graduate of Al-Azhar University who translated Qur'an into the Oromo. (For the detail of his life and work, click on his name.)
- Gelemso and its vicinity had produced multiple scholars which include Dr. Ashagre Yigletu of the Dergue

== History ==
=== Early history ===
It is difficult to trace when the history of the town starts. And it is so troublesome to single out the early history of the town from the history of the whole of the Hararghe highlands. But for accuracy purposes, and to construct a relevant historical order, it is better to discuss those tales that directly focus to the town itself. Accordingly, some data obtained from oral history and written sources, which might describe the antique nature of the town, are not presented here. These include specially the one that related to the ancient Harla people, whom we know only through their legends and few descriptions in the works of some scholars.

All of our sources (oral and written) dignify the importance of a man mentioned above as Aw Seid in the birth of the town. It is said that Aw Seid was appointed by Sheikh Abadir, the then chief Islamic scholar in Harar, to preach Islam to the Oromos around Gelemso in the second half of the 13th century. Hence, as the sources say, Aw Seid came with his family and settled at Gelemso. He built the first mosque of the town, but he had little success in converting the local Oromos to Islam. Latter, he disagreed with the Ittu Oromo and returned to Harar, where he died and buried according to legends.

However, some of the most notable scholars who studied the case deeply, such as Ulrich Bräukamper, suggest that the Islamization effort of Aw Seid could be a phenomenon of latter ages (i.e. after the 16th century), an argument that has a good ground, as far we consider the starting period of the mutual interdependence between the Muslims of the southeast and their Oromo neighbors. But one thing that deserves attention here is the recurrent appearance of a name Aw Seid or Seid Ali in the long list of Harari saints, from which we may infer the saint called so was not a mere a legendary man only. (For example, he might have been engraved in Harar after his mission had failed in the land of the Ittu Oromo). For all, detail investigations would clarify the real story.

The current site of Gelemso town lays, according to proposed suggestions, within the boundary of the ancient Sultanate of Dawaro. whom in the 14th century, the Syrian writer Abu Fadlulah Al Umari and, in the 15th century, the Egyptian Al Makrizi had mentioned as one of the Seven Islamic Principalities of the Southern and Eastern Ethiopia that constituted the Zeyla Federation .

In the oral history collected from the elderly people, the ancient Dawaro is said to be synonymous to the late Daro district which was merged with the adjacent district of Lebu to form the current Darolebu woreda during the Haile Selasie period. However, it is unclear as to what Gelemso appeared to be when the ancient Sultanate of Dawaro was flourishing. But again, we may argue that the oral history concerning the Islamization effort of Aw Seid, in which Gelemso is identified as the scene of action, may have solid truths which can be inferred from the chronological concurrence of the mission of Aw Seid and the flourishing era of the Sultanate of Dawaro (i.e. both of them were phenomena of the same historical period, from the 13th century to the 15th century).

And again, it is said that Gelemso assumed a wider fame with the foundation of Oda Bultum as a cultural and administrative center of the Eastern Barento Oromos (one of the two major tribal confederations of the Oromo people, the other being Borana) . Here, as a number of books have recorded, it was also Aw Seid who played a key role in the derivation of the Oromo Constitutional Law (called Hera) at Oda Bultum.

Prior to the 1991 governmental change (during Haile Selassie and Dergue times), people who live closer to the Oda Bultum often called the Oda itself as Aw Seid. (oda is a tree known in its scientific name as Ficus gnaphalocarpa) . And multiple rituals exercised when the Ya'ii (conferences) of the Chaffe Gada were undertaken at Oda Bultum in recent years were called in the name of Aw -Seid. In this case, the role of the saint called Aw-Seid at the establishment of Oda Bultum can be accepted without any doubt.

However, it is not clear again how Gelemso was elevated to a place of high social status with the establishment of Oda Bultum, pertaining that the place called so is 25 km from the town. Some people say Gelemso was an administrative capital and the seat of the Mana Bokkuu (the President's Office) of the Eastern Oromo, with Oda Bultum serving as the place where Caffee Gadaa assembled only once in eight years. And others say that it was a place where the Oda Bultum itself was located prior to its move to the current place.

Latter on, oral history says, Gelemso evolved to an important village of commerce when one of its counties called Qabri Lukku (now found in the south eastern tip of the town) was organized as a market center to accommodate traders who were coming from different regions. It is said that at that place, a local chief called Lukkuu had mastered over the caravan traders who used to sell the goods they brought from remote areas. Few elders, however, dispute this story and say rather Lukku was a man who in ancient times, left the traditional Oromo religion and accepted Islam so that when he was diseased, the Ittu Oromo sanctioned his dead body not to be buried with the mass, a reason why we see his grave on isolated ground. (Qabrii Lukku mean grave of Lukku)

To conclude, when we consider oral histories which assert the town had Karra Torba (The Seven Gates) in ancient times, non existent in the case of other towns of West Harerghe save Gelemso, when we consider its presence closer to places of significant traditions like Halayya Buchuro and Laga Bera (retold as a place where once ruthless and contestant dictatorial queen called Akkoo Manoyye had built her palace), when we analyze its tie to Oda Bultum and the presence of the shrines of Aw-Seid both at Gelemso and Oda Bultum, we can deduce that Gelemso must had been a place of higher social and spiritual importance in the tradition of the Oromo people since ancient times. And to the least, we can say it existed on the line of history long before the appearance of a number of the current towns of the Hararghe region.

=== After the conquests of Menelik II ===
In 1887, while campaigning to occupy the city state of Harar and the whole of Eastern Ethiopia, which he accomplished after his victory at the Battle of Chelenqo, Emperor Menelik II had arrived at the bottom of the current Gelemso town. The Ethiopian writer Tekletsadik Mekuria tells that Menelik arrived at Gelemso on December 18, 1886.

Menelik was attracted by the landscape around Gelemso and ordered a garrison to be founded there, which his warlords had executed immediately. The garrison was established at the western part of the current town, and had been called Gorgo (an Amharic name for a kind of tree). That was a second turn in the long history of Gelemso, by which it had leaped from a small village of cultural importance to a truly urbanized community. However, elderly people assert that the formation of the garrison had also some bad objectives behind. It is said that Menelik II had an aim of erasing the centrality and symbolism of early places like Gelemso from the mind and the heart of his Oromo subjects.

Truly speaking, it was Emperor Menelik II who officially closed down all of the traditional Oromo institutions like Chaffe assembly and prohibited a number of other cultural feasts, a fact that Ethiopian writers of the early 20th century like Aleqa Tayye had recorded. But the true urban feature of the town dates from Menelik's period. This will be agreeable when we know that in 1908, Gelemso was one of the few centers that the imperial government formally recognized as true towns.

=== During the Italian occupation ===
Gelemso stayed under a period of dwarfism and stagnancy in the reign of Ras Teferi Mekonnen (latter Emperor Haile Selassie I) who had special sympathy for another town established in the Chercher highlands and named for his honor Asebe Teferi (which means Teferi wished it in Amharic). Bahru Zewde narrates that in 1933, immediately after his ascension to the throne, Emperor Haile Selesie made Chercher awraja the model of his future administration system.

However, when Italy conquered Ethiopia and formed the Italian East Africa in 1935, Gelemso began to expand in every direction. During their five years administration, the Italians returned the seat of the Chercher province to Gelemso (which was moved first to Kunni, then to Asebe Teferi or Chiro by the Haile Selassie officials) and made valuable change on its urban customs. They established new settlements in the northern and eastern parts of the town, starting from a hill called now Kambo (from Italian campo which mean a military camp).

The Italian occupiers also constructed the first graveled road of the town, and connected it with Addis Ababa and Dire Dawa through all weather roads which run in the west to Awash (via small towns of Hardim and Bordode), and in the east to Dire Dawa through Wachu and Badessa. (The remnant of the western old road still exists with its decorated Italian style bridge built on the northern section of Aw Seid river). The first modern buildings of the town were also attributed to the Italians, the most eloquent of them being St. Michael Catholic Church mentioned above.

Scholars tell us that the Italians had focused on Gelemso because of its presence in the vicinity of Wachu (10 km east of Gelemso), a place where they intended to build Secondo Roma (Second Rome), a future city to be evolved from the agrarian community that would be brought from southern Italy under the resettlement program.

On the other hand, one of the most important features of Gelemso town, the Sheikh Omar mosque, was built in that period while Sheikh Omar was Qadi of the Chercher province.

=== After the Italian occupation ===
In 1951, the Christian missionary group of American Adventist Church constructed the first school of the town at a place called Lode (now separated from the main town by gorge created by gully erosion and called Tirso). Although the group closed its missionary activities in the 1960s, the school they built has continued to function to this day, and the elderly people still call it Amerikaanii (The American).

Gelemso was made a municipal town in 1952. And in the year 1958, while it remained still under the Chercher awraja administration, it was designated an electoral district (in Amharic called የምርጫ አውራጃ) and had got 2 seats in the imperial parliamentary assembly of the Haile Seliasie regime, which was won in that very year by Haji Abdullahi Sheikh Ahmed and Mukhtar Mohammed. However, the governmental projects were rarely planned and executed in the town then. But when it became the capital of Habro awraja upon the splitting up of the former Chercher awraja to Habro and Chercher-Adal-Gara Gurachaawrajas (Chiro or Asebe Teferi remained the latter's capital) in the year 1968 and afterwards, some improvements were made. For example, the town was equipped with electric light service for 6 hours a night, and its tap water supply system (built by Italians) was expanded.

However, it was the efforts of Arabian, European and Asian traders that greatly helped Gelemso continue its long standing role as market center and social panorama. The list of those foreign traders includes Nasir Sana'ani, Abdallah Ubadi, Ali Ahmed, Ali Sa'ad, Salah Muhsin who were all Yemenis, the Greeks Kostar Gragor and his brother Stafrol, the Italians Antonio Viccini and Francesco Berto, the Sudanese Haji Abdullah and Sheikh Bashir Babikir, and the Indian Usma'il Hindii.

Later on, natives of the town like Mohammad Abdo (Lungo), Ahmed Yusuf, Mohammed Beker, Muteki Sheikh Mohammed and his brother Ahmad Taqi, Haji Ahmed Nure, Haji Sani Abdulqadir, Ahmed Alhadi, Usmail Ahmayyu, Nejash Usmail, Belew Haile, Mekonnen Metaferia, Jemaneh Yimamu, Tiruneh Gebremichael, Omar Ghazali and his brother Mumme Ghazali etc....and known Ethiopian entrepreneurs like Mohammed Abdullahi Ogsade also entered to the business and they altogether marked the town's commercial era. That was why the Commercial Bank of Ethiopia moved against its working rule of the time and opened a branch at Gelemso (according to its working rule of that time, the bank do not open its branch in a town found far away from the High Way).

In the late 1960s and early 1970s, General Taddese Birru, a well known Oromo nationalist and co-founder of Mecha-Tulama Self Help Association, had been in the town for his supposed ግዞት (Amharic for house arrest) . Fortunately, the incident favored Tadesse to meet other early Oromo nationalists like Elemo Kiltu, Ahmad Taqi and Mohammed Zakir Meyra, with whom he could demonstrate his devotion for Oromo freedom, an act that became one of the main reasons for which Gelemso is heard so loudly.

=== From the 1974 revolution to 1992 ===
When the Dergue came to power in 1974, more attention was given to Gelemso. Viewers and most of the residents say that the Dergue era was a prosperous time in the town's history where multiple governmental buildings were erected, and subsequent improvements were made in the town. This includes the health centre, two primary schools, the current Gelemso High School, the multipurpose city assembly hall (a unique at the time in all of Eastern Ethiopia), the public slaughter house, a stadium, youth recreation center, farmers training center and most notably, the Gelemso-Mechara high way. On the other hand, NGOs like CARE international highly participated in the development activities of the Habro awraja starting from the late 1980s.

The 1984 Harerghe Province All Games Championship it hosted was the major sport festival in history of the town where all of the 13 awrajas in Hararghe participated in the contest. Gelemso was also the first town of Eastern Ethiopia where the Development Bank of Ethiopia had opened its branch (now this branch had moved to Chiro or Asbeteferi). One of the main urban zones of the town, called in its Amharic name Addis Ketema (the New City), totally emerged during the Dergue time as well. It is worth having also to mention the former President Mengistu Haile-Mariam had visited Gelemso and its surrounding villages in 1985 which makes Mengistu the only Ethiopian ruler that came across the town for official visit while in office.

However, the prosperous situation prevailing during the Dergue time must never be considered as an expression of sympathetic view of the Dergue towards Gelemso. The motives behind the Dergue's considerable attention, as some people believe, were the economic importance of the Habro awraja for whom Gelemso was a capital (among the 13 awrajas of the former Hararghe province), and to an equal importance, Gelemso's central location in the Chercher highlands, a region highly known for Oromo rebellion.

Indeed, the Dergue era was also a period where brutal campaigns like the Red Terror were undertaken in Gelemso and elsewhere in the country. For instance, the residents of Gelemso still have fresh memories of the Kara Qurqura Massacre where 70 people (half of them in the pretext of Amhara land lords who resist the land reform, and half of them labeled Oromo secessionists who conspire against the state with Somali Expansionists) were taken away from town, executed, and then bulldozed to one grave in April 1970 at a place called Karra Qurqura. (20 km east of Gelemso. In similar way Dergue military groups massacred 32 innocent civilians (children, baby of 1 year, women and elderly) bulldozed and buried in one grave yard in the place called 'Biyo' few km from town of Michata. It is still remembered locally as 'Qabri sodoma' in local Oromo language.

On May 30, 1991, the town came under the control of the Oromo Liberation Front (OLF) and was made the administrative center of the OLF-held areas in the former provinces of West Hararghe, Arsi and Bale. The most memorable event of that time was the Oda Bultum festival, where about 800,000 Oromos came together at Gelemso and Oda Bultum to celebrate the resurrection of the ancient Chaffe Gadaa assembly tradition.

On June 21, 1992, when OLF quit the transitional government, Gelemso was passed to the current Ethiopian government led by the Ethiopian People's Revolutionary Democratic Front along with the other towns of the West Harerghe Zone.
