= Elemo Qiltu =

Ethiopian businessman and guerrilla commander (1936–1974)

- Born: Hassan Ibrahim; 1936; Garsa, Italian East Africa (present-day Oromia Region, Ethiopia)
- Died: August 1974 (aged 37–38); Chercher Mountains, Ethiopian Empire
- Cause of death: Killed in action in the Battle of Tiro
- Occupations: Businessman, guerrilla commander
- Organization: Oromo Liberation Army
- Known for: First and most prominent leader of the Oromo Liberation Army
- Spouse: Ammune Omar
- Children: 2

Hassan Ibrahim (1936 – August 1974), better known by his nom de guerre Elemo Qiltu, was an Ethiopian guerrilla commander and businessman. A prominent member of the Oromo nationalist movement, he served as one of the first leaders of the Oromo Liberation Army.

== Biography ==
=== Early life ===
Not much is known of Elemo's early life but by 1956 he had had an Islamic education and was living in Dire Dawa working for a wealthy Arab merchant who eventually took him to Aden, Yemen (then the Aden Protectorate) in 1956. He changed his name to Elemo Qiltu shortly after arriving in Aden. After marrying another Oromo living in Aden, Elemo started his own business which grew to be very successful.

=== Entering politics ===
He never cared much about politics but his house became an occasional meeting place for Oromo nationalists and by 1966, this began to attract the attention of the local Ethiopian Consulate. He was suspected of financing enemies of the Ethiopian government. In 1967, a Harari businessman working for the Ethiopian government, visited Aden from Ethiopia and borrowed goods from Elemo and promised to pay him back if he came with him to Addis Abeba, Ethiopia. Shortly after arriving in the city, Elemo was arrested and accused of involvement in anti-Ethiopian terrorist activities. Elemo underwent intensive interrogation, severe beatings and psychological torture which all led him to becoming more and more politicised. He was only let go after his friends raised money and bribed a prominent Ethiopian security chief. The time he spent in prison turned Elemo into a convinced Oromo nationalist and, upon his release, he began to involve himself with the Oromo nationalist movement that had sprung up in the country in the form of the Mecha Tullama Self-Help Association.

In 1968, Elemo secretly went into Mogadishu, Somalia and attended a meeting of Oromo nationalists in which he was tasked with promoting Oromo nationalism to the Arab world. He moved back to Aden and formed an Oromo community association and managed to convince the city government of Aden to allow him to open a political office. He also sought support from different Arab governments as well as the Palestine Liberation Organization and the Eritrean Liberation Front. With the help of the Iraqi government, he was able to provide a seven-month military training programme for Oromo nationalists and organized them into an efficient guerrilla force. He dispatched the force under the leadership of his friend, Abdul Karim Hajji Ibrahim, more commonly known as Jaarraa Abbaa Gadaa. The group was ambushed, captured and imprisoned by Somali forces after trying to cross into Ethiopia from northern Somalia.

Despite the setback, Elemo didn't lose hope and started smuggling and stockpiling weapons in Ethiopia through the Afar desert with the help of the Eritrean Liberation Front. Early in 1973, Elemo was invited to attend a clandestine meeting of all major Oromo underground movement leaders in Addis Abeba. This meeting led to the formation of the Oromo Liberation Front and he was tasked with launching an armed struggle against the Ethiopian government.

=== Oromo Liberation Army ===
After the meeting, Elemo, along with a fellow Oromo nationalist Hundee Taqi, went to Gelemso to begin the armed struggle. There they met the famed Tadesse Birru who was under house arrest. Elemo began to secretly organize an armed force in the city and Hundee's father suggested he base the guerrilla force in an area called Guba Koricha in the Chercher Mountains. In May 1974, Elemo took twenty men and made a base camp in the mountains. They then began to attack the guards of Mulatu Tegegn, a local landowner who was notorious for abusing the local populace. They eventually killed Mulatu after he ordered the killing of a Muslim teacher in Gelemso.

The killing of Mulatu shocked the region and the administrators sent their own troops to deal with the insurrection but failed. The local militias were unable to stop the guerrilla army which led the government of Ethiopia to send General Getechew Shibeshi to Gelemso with a large force. Elemo's army rarely engaged in long battles which made it hard for General Getachew to deal decisive blows to the guerrilla force. Getachew finally managed to surround the Oromo Liberation Army at the Battle of Tiro and managed to kill most of the force in the ensuing battle. Elemo surrendered but then blew himself up with a grenade when the government soldiers came to arrest him.

== Legacy ==
Elemo Qiltu is considered a martyr by the Oromo people and he is immortalized in many poems by Sheikh Bakhri Sapalo and many Oromo nationalist songs.
