= Ali Birra =

Ethiopian singer and composer (1950–2022)

Background information
- Born: Ali Mohammed Musa; 29 September 1950; Dire Dawa, Hararghe Province, Ethiopian Empire
- Origin: Oromia, Ethiopia
- Died: 6 November 2022 (aged 72) Adama, Oromia Region, Ethiopia
- Genres: World music; Oromo music
- Occupations: Singer; composer; poet
- Years active: 1961–2022
- Label: Ethio Grooves

Ali Mohammed Musa (Oromo: Alii Birraa; 29 September 1950 – 6 November 2022), known professionally as Ali Birra, was an Ethiopian singer. He was regarded as the most popular Oromo icon, as well as an influential artist in the other regions and urban areas of Ethiopia. He had played a lot of songs in Amharic, Afar, Arabic and Somali languages. Ali was a celebrated as a poet and multi-instrumentalist.

== Early life and career ==
Ali Birra was born in Ganda Kore, Dire Dawa on 29 September 1950. His parents separated when he was three years old, and was subsequently raised by his father. He attended Arabic school as a child, where he learned to write the language. Birra, however, was raised speaking the Oromo language. He also enrolled in a local public school and pursued his education until sixth grade. He then moved to America.

In his early years, Birra would do small street-peddling in order to support his livelihood without begging people for money. When he was 13, he joined Afran Qallo, a cultural group which he was operating unofficially to promote the Oromo music and culture. The first time he sang on stage, he sang a song titled "Birra dha Bari'e". Due to this song, he was given the nickname "Ali Birra". "Ali" is his first name and "Birra" is the initial song name. By blending the two words, it creates the meaning "Ali the Spring". The government banned the Afran Qallo group in 1965 and arrested some of its members. Birra escaped arrest and moved to Addis Ababa.

After settling in Addis Ababa, he engaged in different activities alongside singing. On this occasion, Birra came to know the nationalist Ahmad Taqi, and the latter bought him a guitar so that Birra could sing more widely. Taqi may have influenced him that Ali himself has been one of the Oromo nationalists for the rest of his life. Though he had songs about his birthplace Dire Dawa and Oromia, he never uttered the word Ethiopia, as Oromo nationalists do. His fame increased dramatically throughout the city. In addition to Oromo, his mother tongue, Birra had the ability to sing in Amharic, Arabic, Harari, and Somali languages. He gained appreciation from different contemporary personalities, including Eyoel Yohannes, at the time the head of Kebur Zabagna, who then recruited him as a solo singer in Oromo. He joined other famous singers such as Mahmoud Ahmed, Tilahun Gessesse and Bizunesh Bekele.

Birra traveled with the group through Ethiopia and Sudan to sing with well-known celebrities like Mohammed Wardi. When he was in Addis Ababa, he would perform in large venues such as the Hager Fikir Theatre and Ras Theatre. Following a discussion with his father, he left Addis Ababa. In the early 1970s, at the break of the Ethiopian Revolution, Ahmad Taqi was killed in eastern Ethiopia while fighting the Ethiopian army.

Birra continued his career both as a musician and a composer. He produced his first album in 1971, the first in the history of Oromo music. He then recorded successful hits such as "Hin Yaadin", "Asabalee", "Ammalelee", and "Gamachu". His albums included Sudanese songs such as "Al-Habib Ween" and Harari songs such as "Yidenqal".

Birra married Birgitta Åström in 1985. In 1986, Birra's wife was transferred to Saudi Arabia, and Birra accompanied her to the country. But Birra faced difficulties in Saudi Arabia, and proceeded to Sweden, where he lived for two years. In 1988, he went to the United States to attend the Los Angeles Arts Academy. He graduated in 1990, and by 1992, he had released his first two albums outside of Ethiopia amid increasing international fame. He also conducted many concerts and festivals in many countries, including the 2005 Enkutatash (Ethiopian New Year) celebration at the Addis Sheraton.He celebrates his 50 years journey on the music in 2013.

== Illness and death ==
In August 2009, Birra reported that he had recently been treated for colon cancer, but planned to continue performing music, in spite of reports that his most recent album would be his last.

In early 2022, Birra's health was in critical condition and he was hospitalized at Adama General Hospital. On 6 November 2022, the Oromia Regional State media announced his death in Adama, at the age of 72. On 8 November, Ali Birra was given a state funeral. The funeral service was conducted at Muslim Cemetery in Dire Dawa, his birth place, after a farewell ceremony was carried out at a Sheger Park. Thousands of fans and notable people were present at the funeral.

== Awards ==
In 1995, Birra received the Toronto African Merits Award.

In 2010, Ali received an honorary doctorate from Jimma University.

In 2019, Ali received another honorary doctorate (DHL) from Dire Dawa University.

== Selected discography ==
Albums

Title	Album details
Ali Mohamed Birra With The Adu Band "Abbaa lafaa"	Released: 1975; Record label: Kaifa Records
Ammalele	Released: 1979; With Ibex band; Record label: Domino Sound, Little Axe Records, Mississippi/Little Axe Records
Dumbushee galaa	Released 1977 With Dahlak band Label: kaifa recording With Dahlak ba
Gammachuu	Released 1983 With Ethio-Star band ገነት ሙዚቃ ቤት
Oromiyaa	Released 1992 With ORA
Hin yaadin/Bareeda uumaa	Released 1997 Lebel: Awash Sonic Records- Switzerland
Jaalala Biyyaa	Released 2005 Label: Adil Tango records
Barnoota !	Released 2012: Record label: Malik Philips Media Int

Singles and EPs

Title	Single/EP details
"Awash" / "Sinhanbisin Werri" (7")	Released: 1973; Label: Philips, Philips
"Eshurourou" / "Hinyadini Kaifa Records"	Released: 1975; Record label: Kaifa Records
"Abba Lafa" / "Esetin Siarga"	Released: 1975; Record label: Kaifa Records
"Awash" / "Sinhanbisin Werri" (7")	Released: 2017; Record label: Heavenly Sweetness
