= Umar Bakkalcha =

Ethiopian nationalist of Oromo people (1953?–1980)

Umar Bakkalcha (1953?–1980) was an Ethiopian nationalist and one of the early Oromo nationalists and martyrs well-remembered in the Chercher highlands of Harerghe especially for the heroic speeches he made at his death spot. His name had been Umar Sheikh Mohammed Rabi, but the people usually refer to him as “Umar Bakkalcha” or simply “Bakkalcha” (the downfall star).

== Family ==
Umar was a son of Sheikh Muhammad Rabi, one of the outstanding Ulama (Islamic Scholars) of the West Harerghe, and Aisha Ibrahim whom the people of the town usually call “Ashe Ibro”. He was the third child of his parents but the second eldest of the boys.

Being a grandson of the famous Sheikh Umar Aliyye al-Galamsiyyi, a noted Islamic scholar of the Qadiri Sufi order, his father named him “Umar” in honor of this grandfather of him.

== Early life and education ==
As he was born in a family known chiefly for propagation of Islamic teachings, Bakkalcha had a good access to learn Qur’an and other basic Islamic educations. Nassir Sheikh Muhammed Siraj, a cousin of Bakkalcha, told to the writer of this article (Aladdin Alevi) once that Bakkalcha had attended the Shafi’i Fiqh (Islamic Jurisprudence) lessons until he completed a book called Baa-Fadl (the third Fiqh book in the Islamic teaching tradition that existed in Harerghe) but others dispute this and say rather Bakkalcha had attended more than that.

He was enrolled to the formal school (probably in the second half of the 1960s) and completed the primary education at the Italian built Mana Dheeraa (Originally Saint Michael Catholic Church but now Gelemso No.2 Primary School) which would become his prison as well. Then after, he completed the junior secondary education at Gelemso No.1 Junior Secondary School. Our sources say Bakkalcha had attended up to grade 10 but he couldn't continue more than that due to his increased participation in the Oromo national movements.

His friends describe that Bakkalcha was a sportsman of the town from the beginning. He was a good midfielder in the football (soccer) and a kick boxer of no rivals. However this didn't cause him to disrupt the right of others. He was a respectful and tolerant man. That is why he had friends from all social classes of the town.

== Struggle ==
Bakkalcha was enlightened in the Oromo National struggle from the very beginning, however, the most brainstorming incident that took him to decide giving up all of his belongings for the Oromo causes was the death of the Oromo patriots and guerrilla leaders called Elemo Qilltu (Hassen Ibrahim) and Ahmad Taqi Sheikh Muhammed Rashid (Hundee).

Even though Bakkalcha had only indirect involvement in the guerrilla's operations then, the death of those irreplaceable heroes made him to think about his people and his freedom day and night. So then, he made himself to immerse in the group founded hiddenly to promote the national agenda in the Chercher Highlands and to undertake military operations if possible. This group, called “Tuuta Bariisaa” (the Downfall Group) and led by Bakkalcha's uncle called Mohammed Zakir Meyra, had few members at its start due to the group's welfare strategy of the time. That means, it was not as such open to anyone because of the precautious measures taken by its leaders.

== Surviving the rivals ==
When two of the aforementioned group's leaders (Meyra and Mus’id Salah Muhsin) marched to Somalia in 1976 to seek material assistance for their proposed guerrilla operations, the group's activities came under clear attack of the Dergue officials. On the other hand, the swelling up of the most famous hidden party of the time called EPRP, a Neo-Marxist elite party which accepted the Oromo National Questions only in its partial interpretations, brought a big fear among the members of Bakkalcha's group and all of the then Oromo nationalists. So Bakkalcha and his group mates decide to expand the group's operations inside the public and recruit members from all social grounds. Henceforth, strategies which would enable them reach all Oromos (the rural and the urban), and which could hinder the activities of their rivals (like EPRP) were designed. Many informal groups were established openly and in disguise. For example, Bakkalcha and his friends formed a group called FAA (Fair Age Association) inside their school. This group was openly known by anyone in the school including the schoolmasters, and its membership was allowed to any youth. But it didn't promote any nationalist idea to the public, neither did Bakkalcha used it for such purposes. Its very aim was to hinder the movements of EPRP which was expanding at an alarming rate among all youth of the time.

== Intensifying the group's movement ==
When the Dergue formed its coalition with AESM (All Ethiopia Socialist Movement popularly called MEISON in its Amharic acronym) alongside other pro-leftist parties professing the shared aim of deepening socialism at a grass root level, it was seen as an opportunity by many Oromos to strengthen the frameworks of the Oromo national struggle. Organisations such as the Ethiopian Subjects Revolutionary Struggle ( ESRS, Amharic: ኢጭአት ), which were formed by Oromos to create a legal basis for national activities, would be more involved with government decisions.

That incident had brought a good opportunity to the Bakkalcha's group as well. Many government officials of the “Habro Awraja” became members of the group and supported the group's movements by all necessary means. A strong and effective communication was established between the urban groups and the rural guerrilla fighters who were present mostly in Boke, Darolebu, and Guba Qoricha districts. Witnesses say that the guerrilla could get necessary supply through the official government channels while it was fighting the government itself. On the other hand, the guerrilla could escape from the rage of the Dergue when it was fighting WSLF (West Somali Liberation Front) in Boke and Darolebu districts in the winter months of 1977 only because of the strong understanding established inside the government officials of Habro Awraja at that time.

This kind of understanding had never happened in the history of the Chercher Highlands again. And the people of Habro Awraja owe it chiefly to three people namely; Garbi Ahmad who was assigned a chief political cadre of the Habro Awraja at that time, Hajji Adayyu Kabir Girda, Chief of Habro Awraja Farmers Association, and Umar Bakkalcha, the initiator of these motives and leader of the underground Oromo national group.

== Renaissance ==
In 1978, when the Dergue returned victorious from the Ethio-Somali War of 1977-1978, A national campaign was declared to rehabilitate the war torn districts of East Ethiopia. Even though the main event of that campaign, still remembered by its Amharic name የእናት አገር ጥሪ (The Motherland's Call) would be celebrated at a place called “Kara Mara” near Jijjga, cultural festivals and trade-fairs would take place in all of the former Awrajas of Harerghe province. Accordingly, the Oromo nationals who had been the government officials of Habro Awraja informed about the coming event to Bakkalcha and his colleagues. No sooner than he heard the information, Bakkalcha and his friends rush to form an Oromo cultural group which had a memorable effect until now.

In December 1978, the “Habro Cultural Festival and Trade Fair” was opened inside a compound of the Gelemso Branch of Ethiopian Roads Authority which is found near to the Aw-Seid river bank. Personalities like Tilahun Gessesse, Bizunesh Bekele and Mahmoud Ahmed came for the musical show and got appreciations of their side. But when Bakkalcha and his fellow friends brought the first fully organized Oromo musical group of Habro Awraja on the scene, many spectators burst into tears. And the Oromos learned that Afaan Oromoo was good enough to sing on in any circumstances. And many had witnessed how beautiful the Oromo Cultural dress was, and they made up their mind not to disregard their culture from that day onwards.

However, the group's efforts was appreciated and acknowledged not only because of the songs of Afaan Oromoo and the cultural dress it brought to the stage. It was also because of the contents of those songs. Many singers of the group such as Gadisaa Abdullahi could openly address the Oromo agenda in their songs. For example, Gadisaa said in one of his songs

Fedidhaan Haatatu Tokkumaan Sabootaa

Hojiin Haa Mul’atu Qixxumaan Sabootaa

Tana gaafiin teenya tan Cunqurfamtootaa

Ilmaan Oromootaa

== Arrest and the campaigns of 1979-1980 ==
In early 1979, when the Dergue finished up its mutual coalition with all of the political organizations of that time, a countrywide mass arrests were undertaken to eradicate all opponents. The situation had caused the Oromo nationalists to join the rural guerrilla warfare. Similarly, Umar Bakkalcha who was leading the Oromo national struggle in Gelemso went to the jungle with his fellow friends and joined the Oromo guerrilla fighters. Understanding this, Colonel Zeleke Beyyene, chief of the Dergue Commissariat for the Harerghe Province, and Mekonnen Maru, the then Administrator of Habro Awraja, ordered the imprisoning, torturing and if necessary, the murdering of anyone who had contacts with Bakkalcha and his group. About 100 Oromo merchants, students, and civil servants were taken from Gelemso, Baddessa, Machara and Boke, and they were all detained at the aforementioned Mana Dheeraa. Further the well-known Ulama of the Gelemso area such as Sheikh Mohammed Siraj (Bakkalcha's uncle) were imprisoned. Many of the detainees were flogged bitterly. Some were emasculated. And from among them, well-known Oromo nationalists like the Yemen born Abdallah Ali (nicknamed “Abdalla footoo”-“Abdalla the Photographer”) were killed because of the ruthless flogging.

The hunt for Bakkalcha continued. And the looting and killing campaign of Colonel Zeleke Beyne and his appointees expanded to the maximum. An administrator of Habro district called Getachew Tadesse intensified the terror by applying a merciless murdering techniques in the rural, and Mekonnen Maru became a chief torturing man and confiscator of the properties of the Oromo merchants in the urban.

== Guerilla fighting ==
The eyewitnesses of the time describe that the mass arresting and the murdering campaigns of the Dergue that we discussed in the above section was designed to suppress all Oromo movements and to sow terror among the Oromo fighters. However, the continued campaigns couldn't bring any effect on the lionhearted warriors like Umar Bakkalcha who was leading his guerrilla group in the nearby jungles of Boke. Our narrators recall that the hero had marched against his enemy in all jungle lands that stretch from Weyne up to Boke Gudo. As a battalion leader, he had fought on a number of battles where he had shown his bravery. Some narrators say that he could even rout a big force of multiple size with handful of his followers.

On the other hand, Bakkalcha could understand the necessity of continuing the communication among the nationalists who are disguised among the urban population and the rural guerrilla fighters. Accordingly, he had tried to reach the urban cells that the Dergue could not identify. Thus, he could support many nationalists in evading arrest and death.

== Final days ==
Although the Dergue's campaign of mass arrests and killings did not deter some opposition figures such as Bakkalcha, it had a demoralizing effect on other members of the resistance. A number of Bakkalcha's associates withdrew from the struggle, citing grievances that have not been specified. Among those who surrendered, some provided information to the Dergue that was used to justify further arrests of Oromo nationalists. The Dergue subsequently intensified its repression, leading to the imprisonment of individuals such as Haji Adayyu” at Aw-Izin prison in Harar, where he remained for approximately ten years.

In the rural front, more guerrilla fighters withdrew from the struggle due to the false statements disseminated by those notorious persons, leaving Bakkalcha and his few comrades to their own fate. The already endangered communication line between the urban Oromo nationalists and the rural fighters was totally cut out, and this was elongated even to the destabilization of the whole networking among all guerrilla units themselves. The fighters start to miss each other wandering in the forests of Chercher Highlands day and night. And At last, Umar Bakkalcha, found himself surrounded by only three of his colleagues.

On one night of the summer months of 1980, while they were searching for the path that took them to the “Aniyya” lowlands of the former “Gara Mulata” Awraja, Bakkalcha fall on the hands of the Dergue hunters. They took him to Gelemso and imprisoned him at Mana Dheeraa where many of his relatives and friends were suffering.

== Martyrdom ==
The Dergue was hunting Bakkalcha on the assumption that his capture could lead to the total collapse of the Oromo rebellion activities in Gelemso and the whole of the Chercher region. This was calculated on two bases. First, the Oromos saw Bakkalcha as the icon and symbol of their struggle, so his removal would eradicate this sentiment and humiliate the Oromos. Second, as he had existed in the struggle since the time of Elemo Qiltu and Ahmad Taqi, the Dergue officials assumed that Bakkalcha would give them first hand information which would lead to the destruction of the core body of their fighting units.

However, Bakkalcha refused to give them information and the investigation process lasted for about four months. He instead made speeches in front of the Dergue officials, raising the morale of imprisoned Oromo.

After a series of failed investigations, Dergue officials decided to execute Bakkalcha and his three colleagues. They summoned the public of Gelemso to gather at a place which is found in the southern part of the town and crossed from eastern bank of Aw-Seid river by Gelemso-Mechara Highway. A fabricated statement, which accused Bakkalcha of killing four innocent people, was read by the jury. Bakkalcha was expected to speak his final words in order that he might ask the amnesty of the Revolutionary Government, but did not.

Having said his final words, Bakkalcha and his three comrades were executed by gunshot and buried in one grave.
