= Badessa =

Badessa may refer to:

- Badessa, Oromia, a town in the Oromia region of Ethiopia
- Bedessa, Wolaita, a town in the SNNPR region of Ethiopia
- Badessa (harvestman), a genus of arachnids in the family Samoidae

== See also ==
- Badesse, a village in Tuscany, Italy
- Villa Badessa, a village in Rosciano, Abruzzo, Italy
- Paolo La Badessa, 16th-century Italian humanist
- Bedessa (disambiguation)
