= Abdulle =

Abdulle is both a surname and a given name. Notable people with the name include:

- Mohammed Rashad Abdulle (c.1933-2013), Ethiopian scholar
- Muse Hassan Sheikh Sayid Abdulle, Somali military leader and politician
- Daud Abdulle Hirsi, First Commander Of The Somali Armed Forces
- Aden Abdulle Osman Daar, The First President Of The Somali Republic
