= Bedessa =

Bedessa or Bedesa may refer to:

- Bedessa, Wolaita, a town in the SNNPR Region of Ethiopia
- Badessa, Oromia, a town in the Oromia Region of Ethiopia
- Bedesa, an exonym for the Biate people of India

== See also ==
- Badessa (disambiguation)
- Belessa, a former district of the Amhara Region of Ethiopia
