= Lencho Letta =

Ethiopian politician

Lencho Letta Leencoo lataa
- Born: Dembidolo, Ethiopia
- Education: University of Rochester
- Occupations: Politician; Chemical Engineer
- Political party: Oromo Democratic Front

Lencho Letta (Oromo: Leencoo lataa) is an Ethiopian politician and Oromo activist who was founding member of Oromo Liberation Front (OLF). He was the Deputy Secretary General of the Oromo Liberation Front (OLF) from 1974 to 1995. In Late 1990s, Lencho left OLF leadership due to ideological differences. He is currently the leader of Oromo Democratic front, which was formed in 2013.

== Early life ==
Lencho was born in Dembidolo, Wollega, Western Ethiopia. He studied his elementary and middle school at a local school in Dembidolo. Later, he went to Adama and completed his high school education. In 1966, he enrolled at University of Rochester to study Chemical Engineering and graduated in 1970. After graduation, he returned to Ethiopia and worked as an Engineer in Metehara Sugar factory for one year. In 1971, he moved to Addis Ababa and helped to establish Ethiopian Standards Agency where he worked until 1974.

== Political career ==
From 1970 to 1974, Lencho, along with some Oromo nationalist, was working clandestinely to form OLF. In 1974, the Marxist Derg staged a coup d'état against Emperor Haile Selassie. Late in 1974, Lencho, along with some other Oromo nationalist, went underground and officially launched the OLF for guerrilla army struggle against the Marxist Derg regime of Mengistu Haile Mariam.

Starting from the late 1970s until 1995, Lencho served as Deputy General Secretary of the OLF. He was the leading representative OLF's negotiation team with TPLF leader Meles Zenawi and EPLF leader Isaias Afwerki during the 1980s and early 1990s. He was also leading negotiator for the OLF during Ethiopian Transitional Government from 1991 to 1995. Late 1992, the transitional agreement between OLF and TPLF fell apart, and the OLF quit the transition government to wage army struggle against EPRDF.

In late 1993, Lencho was expelled from OLF due to leadership fallout and an ideological difference with OLF leadership, particularly with the question Oromo self-determination. Since the 1970s, the OLF push for establishing an independent state of Oromia. However, since the introduction of ethnic federalism in Ethiopia in 1995, several Oromo activists including the Oromo People's Congress leader Merera Gudina has been arguing for democratizing the Ethiopian State.

Starting from late 1990s, Lencho became an advocate of preserving Oromo people's right by Democratizing Ethiopian state. He wrote two books – "Ethiopian State at the Crossroads" (Red Sea Press, 1999) and "The Horn of Africa as Common Homeland" (Wilfrid University Press, 2004) – in which he argues in favor of Democratizing Ethiopia.

Later in 2013, Lencho with several former OLF activities launches Oromo Democratic Front (ODF) an opposition organization which is advocating for Oromo right in exile.

On March 19, 2015, Lencho returned to Ethiopia after more than two decades of exile to fight for Oromo rights within the existing political structure in Ethiopia. However, the government of Ethiopia expelled Lencho and other ODF delegation team from Ethiopia within 24 hours.

He currently resides in Oslo, Norway. He is associated with the Norwegian Research Institution, Fafo Institute for Applied International Studies (Fafo AIS). He works as a freelance analyst of political developments in the Horn of Africa.
