= Brigade Nhamedu =

Eritrean diaspora dissident group

- The old flag of Eritrea, occasionally used by the group during demonstrations
- Formation: 2022
- Methods: government-in-exile
- Leader: Beyene Gerezgiher (2026)

Brigade Nhamedu ('Brigade Being ready to fight and sacrifice' or 'Blue Brigade') is an Eritrean dissident organization that aims to overthrow the government of Eritrea, which is a totalitarian dictatorship run by Isaias Afwerki and his party, the People's Front for Democracy and Justice (PDFJ).

Established in 2022 and predominantly based within the Eritrean diaspora, Brigade Nhamedu aims replacing the Eritrean government with a democratic government that respects human rights and rule of law. The other objectives of the organization is to document foreign cooperation with the Eritrean government in repression against pro-democracy Eritreans in the diaspora.. The group seeks to stop or disrupt diaspora gatherings that are supportive of the Eritrean government as well as claims that the Eritrean diaspora are subjected to pro-government propaganda and are pressured to pay taxes to the Eritrean government.

The group was linked to violent confrontations with pro-government diaspora groups in Canada, the US, Sweden, Germany, Norway, The Netherlands and Israel, in 2023 and 2024. A pro-government Eritrean diaspora group called for prosecutors to denote Brigade Nhamedu a terrorist organization.

== Creation ==
According to a UK-based representative of the organization, Brigade Nhamedu was formed in mid-2022 in response to an Eritrean cultural festival organized by Eritrean government actors. According to the representative, Eritrean-government affiliated paramilitary were present at the festival, threatening anti-government activists.

== Structure ==
As of September 2026, the leader of Brigade Nhamedu is Beyene Gerezgiher, based in Addis Ababa. David Teferi is the organization's finance manager.

In 2024, Brigade Nhamedu was organised in Norway, Sweden, The Netherlands, Switzerland, Britain, Germany, the USA, Finland, Israel, Australia and South Africa, according to journalist Martin Plaut, mainly through online social media including PalTalk, Facebook, YouTube, and TikTok. In mid 2026, Brigade members from 17 places around the world (including Ness Ziona in Israel, with 1300 people voting) elected a 51-member council. According to Haaretz, following the council's election, it "met weekly to discuss funding, diplomatic outreach, establishing a base in [Ethiopia] and communicating with people inside Eritrea".

Per-country leaders of the organization include Atakliti Abraham Michael and Mulue Sultan (Israel, 2026).

== Actions ==
Brigade Nhamedu plans to hold elections for a democratic government-in-exile.

== Diaspora clashes ==
On 8 July 2023, several police officers were wounded after a group of Eritreans attacked an event at the Eritrea Festival in Giessen, Germany. The attack could not be conclusively linked to Brigade Nhamedu by the police.

Clashes between pro and anti-government Eritreans occurred in an Eritrean embassy organised event in Tel Aviv in September 2023. By May 2025, nine Eritreans from both sides had been killed in Israel. According to Dawit Teferi, the Brigade's finance manager, the Brigade "had not anticipated the violence and regretted that it [had] occurred".

On 17 February 2024, members of the group violently confronted police and firefighters during a pro-government gathering in The Hague. According to prosecutors, members deliberately attacked police, as they perceived police to protect the pro-government gathering. Twenty-nine police officers were wounded during the confrontations.

Three days later, one of the alleged leaders and co-founders, an Eritrean-Dutch man using the pseudonym 'John Black', was arrested in The Netherlands. John Black claimed to have attempted to get the municipality to retract the pro-government gathering's permit. When this was not honored, he called for a 'Plan B' to stop the gathering. According to Dutch prosecutors, John Black had promoted texts claiming that the group does not bound itself to laws and is a movement of violence.

On 26 March 2025, simultaneous police raids targeted Brigade Nhamedu across Germany and Denmark in connection with attacks in Giessen and Stuttgart. On 15 September 2026, two suspected members whose properties had been raided, identified as general secretary Merhawi A. and first chairman Shimangus T., were arrested in Germany.

== See also ==
- Freedom Friday
