= Battle of Tiro =

1974 battle between the Oromo Liberation Army and imperial government of Ethiopia

- Part of the Oromo conflict and the Ethiopian Civil War
Date	August 1974
Location	Tiro, Ethiopia 8.906441°N 40.650047°E
Result	Ethiopian victory

Belligerents
Ethiopia	Oromo Liberation Army

Commanders and leaders
Gen. Getachew Shibeshi	Elemo Qiltu †; Ahmad Taqi †

The Battle of Tiro took place in August 1974 that was fought between the Oromo Liberation Army, then led by Elemo Qiltu, and Ethiopian government forces.

== Background ==
The Oromo Liberation Army (OLA) was then a small and nascent guerilla force that started out with twenty men (later grew exponentially) and operated in the mountains around the city of Gelemso. After the OLA killed Mulatu Tegegn, a notorious local landowner, the government sent General Getachew Shibeshi and a large force to deal with the guerilla army. The General was unable to deal any decisive blows against Elemo's troops but was able to keep them pinned in the Chercher Mountains. The OLA unit eventually snuck away from the Chercher Mountains and made their way to Tiro, a mountainous region between the towns of Gelemso, Bokhe Tiko and Badhesa.

== Battle ==
In late August 1974, a unit of the Oromo Liberation Army came down from the Chercher Mountains and made their way closer to Gelemso hoping that the fully grown crops would be able to hide them from General Getachew's troops as they made their way closer to the surrounding towns of Bokhe Tiko, Gelemso and Badhesa. They had chosen a mountain in the area of Tiro as a new base of operations and proceeded to climb it. Three of their new recruits; Hundee Taqi, Sheikh Jamal and Colonel Mahdi were unaccustomed to climbing long distances so they spent the night around the bottom of the mountains while the rest of the soldiers camped at the top.

When a soldier was sent to retrieve the recruits, it was discovered that the three had been killed by a government militia that had followed the unit to Tiro. Before long, police and more militiamen from the three nearby towns started arriving at the base of the mountain surrounding it. The Oromo Liberation Army soldiers took high positions and began to engage these troops managing to kill most of the poorly trained militia. Elemo Qiltu, the OLA commander, was injured and so he descended down from the mountain and began to engage troops from the surrounding crop fields.

The fighting continued from dawn until noon, when General Getachew's troops finally arrived from the Chercher Mountains and began to shell the mountain. The government troops also surrounded Elemo Qiltu, leading to his surrender. He called for the soldiers to come and pick him up since he was injured, but blew himself up with a grenade as the Ethiopian soldiers approached him. The government troops managed to get midway up the mountain, capturing a few rebels, but were unable to capture the rest who broke their lines and escaped.

== Aftermath ==
The Ethiopian government punished the population in the area by instigating a wave of mass arrests and killings in the surrounding towns of Gelemso, Boke, Badhesa, Mechere and Balbaleti. The armed wing of the Oromo Liberation Front did not resume operations until 1976, when the group reorganized.
