= Machaa =

The Machaa (Oromo: Maccaa in short Macha, Amharic: ሜጫ) are a subgroup of the Oromo people in western and Central Oromia . They live south of the Blue Nile (Abbai) in the northwestern part of the region of Oromia and in parts of West Shewa Zone, South West Shewa Zone, Oromia Special Zone Surrounding Finfinnee, West Welega Zone, East Welega Zone, Jimma, Jimma Zone, Illubabor Zone, Kelam Welega Zone, Horo Guduru and in parts Amhara Region particularly Gojjam zones. A small group of them lives in the area north of the Blue Nile Wambara in the Benishangul-Gumuz Region.

The area of Macha is a high plateau with undulating hills and some of the higher mountain ranges. Traditionally Macha hardly move below 1500 meters above sea level, since there is a risk of sleeping sickness and malaria would exist.

== History ==
The Macha Oromo are among the clans of Oromo who live in northwest of Oromia. Macha and Tulama are subgroups of the Borana

The establishment of Macha in their present territory seems to be done in small groups and not by larger segments, so that the same clan names are present on a number of places in the area.

The Macha originally had a common Gadaa system with Tulama whose center (chaffe) was south of present-day Addis Ababa. But in the late 16th century, Macha established their own Gadaa with chaffe in Odaa Bilii / Tute Bisil upper Gibe Valley. A man named Makkoo Bilii called there, the independent Gadaa of Macha. In their lore, and Macha Tulama make mutually responsible for this break.

In 1963 , Macha and Tulama Self-Help Association was established mainly by Oromo, but also by members of other ethnic groups in southern Ethiopia. This was first engaged mainly local issues and the promotion of local development began, but soon also for political and cultural freedoms for all Oromo use. As a result, it was banned 1967. In 1994, a successor organization was founded, which was banned in 2004 again. The Macha are the westernmost Cushitic Horners of the Horn peninsula.
