= Islamic Front for the Liberation of the Oromo =

Political party and paramilitary organization in Ethiopia

- Flag of the Islamic Front for the Liberation of the Oromo
- Leader: Jaarraa Abbaa Gadaa
- Dates active: 1985 – 2005
- Active regions: East Hararghe Zone, Oromia Ethiopia
- Ideology: Oromo nationalism Islamism

The Islamic Front for Liberation of the Oromo (abbreviated IFLO) was an Oromo-based political and paramilitary organization founded in 1985 by its Commander in Chief, Sheikh Abdulkarim Ibrahim Hamid, otherwise known as Jaarraa Abbaa Gadaa. The goal of the movement was to form an Islamic state in eastern Oromia and it clashed with the Ethiopian government but also other secular Oromo nationalist groups such as the Oromo Liberation Front (OLF).

== History ==
Jaarraa Abbaa Gadaa – was an Oromo sheikh from Harar and a former candidate for Haile Selassie's parliament who had joined the Oromo Liberation Front (OLF) and became its principal military commander. He would soon find himself at odds with other members of the OLF's central committee that hailed from a student background. A critical juncture was reached in September 1977, when the OLF elected a new chairman, Magarsa Bari, and in April 1978, when significant alterations were made to the executive committee at an OLF congress in the Chercher Mountains. These changes did not sit well with Jaraa. In addition to ridiculing the student intellectuals within the ranks of the leadership and challenging their military acumen, he began to mobilize supporters along religious and regional lines. His critics responded by accusing him of "conspiring with Somalia to spread Islam." At a leadership meeting later that year, a fire-fight broke out in which a senior military commander Baro Tumsa was killed. Jaarraa Abbaa Gadaa was then expelled from the OLF after he was accused of killing Baro Tumsa, he then left the organization with around 300 Muslim Oromo followers and emerged a few years later when he officially formed the Islamic Front for the Liberation of the Oromo (IFLO) in 1985. The movement immediately attracted the attention of the Derg regime as according to Gebru Tarke "The IFLO represented a dangerous mix of ethnonationalism and religious fanaticism in a multiethnic society."

During the 1980s, the IFLO, which emphasized Oromo Islamic identity, and the OLF, which promoted secular Oromo nationalism, frequently clashed—at times more intensely than with the Ethiopian Army itself—especially in Hararghe. Both Oromo groups were also engaged in clashes against the Somali nationalist WSLF, which at times attempted to impose itself on the non-Somali highlands. With an army of up to 3,000 fighters, the group became militarily based in eastern Hararghe, controlling portions of the countryside in the eastern highlands around Dire Dawa by the time Mengistu Haile Mariam fled the country in Spring 1991.

After the Derg was overthrown in 1991 the IFLO then joined the Transitional Government of Ethiopia (TGE) where the party held 3 seats out of the 27 reserved for Oromo parties. The Oromo Liberation Front (OLF) held 12, while the Oromo People's Democratic Organization (OPDO) held the remaining 10.

After withdrawing from the TGE and boycotting the 1995 general elections, the group returned to the bush with the objective of toppling the EPRDF, and has since claimed responsibility for many operations launched against EPRDF targets. In a 1994 interview with an Arabic-language paper made available by An-Najah Blogs, Sheikh Abdulkarim claimed that the mujahideen controlled 24,000 km^{2}, predominantly in the East Hararghe Zone, and were carrying out commando operations against EPRDF targets.

The movement was disbanded in 2005 after Jaarraa created the Front for Independent Democratic Oromia (FIDO) around the same year.

== Links and References ==
- Fidohome.org
- Osar.ch
- Isic-centre.org
- Dosfan.lib.uic.edu
- Google search
- Blogs.najah.edu
