= Mohammed Rashad Abdulle =

Ethiopian Oromo scholar (c. 1933 – 2013)

- Born: c. 1933; Laga Arba, Ethiopia
- Died: May 25, 2013 (aged 79); Dire Dawa, Ethiopia
- Occupation: scholar
- Title: Doctor Sheikh

Sheikh Mohammed Rashad Abdulle (c. 1933 – May 25, 2013) was an Oromo scholar. He is known for developing Oromo phonology and translating the Qur'an into the Oromo language.

== Biography ==
Sheikh Mohammed Rashad was born at Laga Arba village near the town of Gelemso, the son of Kabir Abdulle Kabir Mummaya and Amina Bakar. He learned Qur'an from his father and traveled extensively within the province of Hararghe to acquire further knowledge. His teachers included Sheikh Mohammed Rashid Bilal, Sheikh Hassan Anano, Sheikh Abdullah al-Harari and Sheikh Bakri Sapalo.

Finished a postgraduate program at Al Azhar University in Cairo, Rashad was appointed by the university as officer at their Burao branch school in northwestern Somalia in 1963. After three years of working for Al Azhar in Burao, He went to Mogadishu and started working for Front for Somali Galbeed as a communications officer and youth coordinator. He convinced Somali authorities to open a Radio Mogadishu's Afan Oromo program.

Sheik Mohammed Rashad Abdulle died at age 79 on May 25, 2013, in Dire Dawa.
