= Union of Oromo Students in Europe =

The Union of Oromo Students in Europe, (UOSE) or Tokkumma Bartoota Oromoo Awurooppaa (TBOA) is a student organization based in Germany. Founded in 1974, it is a political organization that functions according to the political programs and political ideals of the Oromo Liberation Front (OLF).

UOSE played the biggest role with its brother organization UOSNA (Union of Oromo Students in North America) in nurturing the language and culture of the Oromo people, protesting against successive Ethiopian regimes, and coordinating the overall support to the OLF from the diaspora. UOSE celebrated its 10 anniversary in 1984. The unions held their 27th annual congress in July 2000, which was attended by delegates of the Union's branches in Belgium, the Czech Republic, Germany, Sweden, Switzerland, and the United Kingdom. The congress also received solidarity and mandating messages from branches of the Union in Greece and Norway.

In July 2008 it gathered its members in Brussels, to condemn what it described as human rights abuses carried out by the Ethiopian government upon the Oromo and other nations in Ethiopia and to solicit support for the OLF.
