= Sheger Park =

Urban park in Addis Ababa, Ethiopia

Friendship Park
- ሸገር ፓርክ
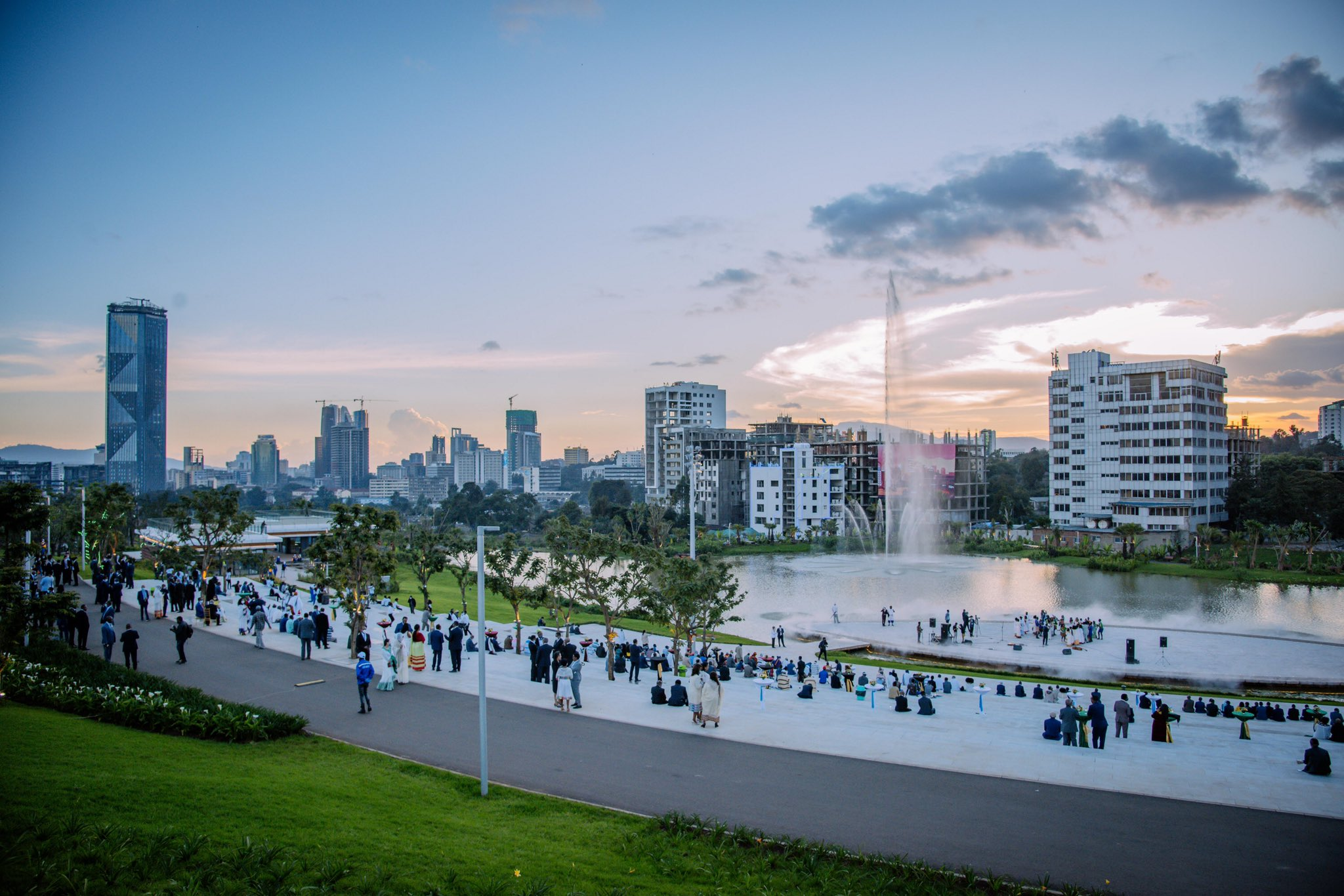
- Interactive map of Friendship Park
- Type: Urban park
- Location: Addis Ababa, Ethiopia
- Coordinates: 9°03′24″N 38°44′20″E
- Opened: 10 September 2020; 5 years ago
- Owned by: Addis Ababa City Administration
- Website: shegerpark.com

Sheger Park (Amharic: ሸገር ፓርክ), also known as Friendship Park, is the biggest urban park in Addis Ababa, Ethiopia. The park is right next to Unity Park (which houses a zoo, and historical archives). Unity Park was opened by Prime Minister Abiy Ahmed with foreign heads of state and government such as the president of Uganda, the president of Kenya, the president of Somalia, and the prime minister of Sudan.) Sheger Park was opened on 10 September 2020, in the presence of high-level Ethiopian government ministers, the president, the prime minister and the first lady.

== Park ==
The park is located in the political center of Addis Ababa where government offices as the Prime Minister and parliament are next to and close by. The park has an artificial lake, a square to gather and also water fountain lights at nighttime. It also contains lots of flowers with diverse species of flora. The project has helped Addis Ababa to become greener, which has enabled the city to enter Bloomberg's 2022 "Best Climate Projects" in C40 Cities Bloomberg Philanthropies Awards.
