= Dawud Ibsa Ayana =

Ethiopian politician (born 1952)

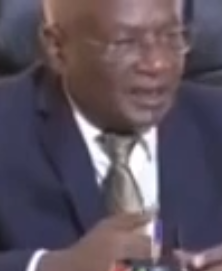

Dawud Ibsaa Ayana (born 1952) is an Ethiopian politician who is the chairman of the Oromo Liberation Front, an Ethiopian political party established in 1973.

== Education ==
Ayana attended the Haile Selassie I University in 1970-1971, and participated in the student movement against Haile Selassie. He joined the Association of Oromo University Students.

1974-1976 he participated in the Zemecha campaign. In 1977, Dawud was elected to the OLF Central Committee. From October 1977 to December 1979, he was imprisoned by the Derg.

He returned to University during the 1979-1980 academic year. Dawud fled to Sudan in 1980 and joined an OLF unit operating from that country, before finishing his studies in statistics. He received basic military training in Eritrea a few months later. In April 1981, Dawud commanded the OLF unit that started the armed struggle in Welega Province.

== Work ==
The Derg poisoned Ayana in December 1981, and tortured him for several months. He was jailed without charge at Kerchele Prison during the period of August 1982 to December 1986. Dawud escaped from jail and rejoined the OLF. In 1988 he was re-elected to the OLF Central Committee and Executive Committee, and headed the OLF military department until 1991. In 1998, he was re-elected to the OLF Executive committee and became the group's chairman in 1999. Dawud told Les nouvelles d’Addis on 29 March 2006 that he was confident that the OLF would form the next government in Ethiopia, a speech which motivated many nationalist Oromo diasporas.
