= Oromo phonology =

Phonology of Oromo language

This article describes the phonology of the Oromo language.

== Consonants ==
The Oromo language has 24 to 28 consonant phonemes depending on the dialect.

Consonants
		Labial	Alveolar/ Retroflex	Palato- alveolar	Velar	Glottal
Nasal		m	n	ɲ ⟨ny⟩		
Plosive Affricate	voiceless	(p)	t	tʃ ⟨ch⟩	k	ʔ ⟨'⟩
Plosive Affricate	voiced	b	d	dʒ ⟨j⟩	ɡ	
Plosive Affricate	ejective	pʼ ⟨ph⟩	tʼ ⟨x⟩	tʃʼ ⟨c⟩	kʼ ⟨q⟩	
Plosive Affricate	implosive		ᶑ ⟨dh⟩			
Fricative	voiceless	f	s	ʃ ⟨sh⟩	x ⟨kh⟩	h
Fricative	voiced	(v)	(z)			
Approximant		w	l	j ⟨y⟩		
Rhotic			r			

/ᶑ/ is a voiced retroflex plosive. It may have an implosive quality for some speakers.

The voiceless stops /t/ and /k/ are always aspirated.

/d/ and /t/ are dental.

The velar fricative [x] is mainly used in the eastern dialect (Harar) as a phoneme. It is represented as ⟨kh⟩ in the Oromo script (Qubee) though it is pronounced as a ⟨k⟩ in most other dialects.

== Vowels ==
Oromo has five vowels which all contrast long and short vowels. Sometimes there is a change in vowel quality when the vowel is short. Short vowels tend to be more centralized than their counterparts.

Though sometimes diphthongs may occur, there are none that occur in a word's unaltered form.

Oromo Vowels
	Front	Central	Back
Close	i /ɪ/, ii /iː/		u /ʊ/, uu /uː/
Mid	e /ɛ/, ee /eː/		o /ɔ/, oo /oː/
Open		a /ɐ/	aa /ɑː/

== Tone ==
When needed, the conventions for marking tone in written Oromo are as follows:

- acute accent - high tone
- grave accent - low tone
- circumflex - falling tone

Tones on long vowels are marked on the first vowel symbol.

In Oromo, the tone-bearing unit is the mora rather than the vowel of the syllable. A long vowel or a diphthong consists of two morae and can bear two tones. Each mora is defined as being of high or low tone. Only one high tone occurs per word and this must be on the final or penultimate mora. Particles do not have a high tone. (These include prepositions, clitic pronouns for subject and object, impersonal subject pronouns and focus markers.) There are therefore three possible "accentual patterns" in word roots.

Phonetically there are three tones: high, low and falling. Rules:

1. On a long vowel, a sequence of high-low is realized as a falling tone.
2. On a long vowel, a sequence of low-high is realized as high-high. (Occasionally it is a rising tone.)

This use of tone may be characterized as pitch accent. It is similar to that in Somali.

Stress is connected with tone. The high tone has strong stress; the falling tone has less stress and the low tone has no stress.

== Phonological processes ==
=== Allophones ===
- /b/ becomes [β] between two vowels.
- /d/ becomes [ð] between two vowels.
- /k/ is pronounced as a voiceless velar fricative before /n/ and /t/.
- The /k/ and /x/ (i.e. the Arabic خ Ḫāʾ) are used interchangeably in the Borana dialect.
- In the Goma dialect, vowels are nasalized before ⟨ng⟩ and ⟨ns⟩,

=== Epenthesis ===
When a vowel occurs in word-initial position, a glottal stop ([ʔ]) is inserted before it.

=== Elision ===
- /n/ is dropped before /w/.
- /d t ɗ/ are dropped before /n/.

=== Sandhi ===
Phonological changes occur at morpheme boundaries (sandhi) for specific grammatical morphemes. There may be assimilation.

- The cluster /ln/ becomes a geminated [lː].
- /bn/ becomes [mn]
- /t/ assimilates into the proceeding /d/, /ɗ/ and /tʼ/.
- /ɗ/ becomes [ɾ] between vowels

== Works cited ==
- Lloret, Maria-Rosa (1997), Phonologies of Asia and Africa, Alan S. Kaye, ISBN 978-1575060194
- Owens, Jonathan (1985), A Grammar of Harar Oromo, Hamburg: Buske, ISBN 3-87118-717-8
