= Ahmad Taqi Sheikh Mohammed Rashid =

Ethiopian nationalist of Oromo people (1942?–1974)

Ahmad Taqi "Hundee" Sheikh Mohammed Rashid (1942 – 6 September 1974) was an Ethiopian Oromo nationalist, known, along with his comrade Elemo Qiltu, as the "first true fighters and martyrs of the Oromo causes". It was these two persons and their few colleagues who founded an organization with a fighting unit that bears the name of the Oromo people, although before them, many nationalists had fought and died for the Oromo causes. In addition, these men are credited with reviving and popularizing usage of the name Oromo in early 1970s.

== Early life ==
Ahmad Taqi was born to Sheikh Muhammad Rashid Bilal of Balballeti-Chirrati, a renowned Islamic scholar, traditionalist, historian, poet and community leader well known in the Harerghe Highlands. His mother was Mariyam Ahmad Hajji Salih Diimaa. He is the third child born to the family of Sheikh Muhammad Rashid.

Ahmad Taqi lived in his early years at his birthplace, called Balbaletti in eastern Ethiopia, in the Habro District of Hararghe Province (modern-day Habro woreda in West Hararghe Zone of the Oromia Region), and there he had studied Qur'an and other Islamic subjects, primarily under the tutorship of his father. Later, he traveled in many areas of the Chercher Highlands with his elder brother Muttaqi Sheikh Muhammed-Rashid, and his favourite cousin Sheikh Abdinur Kabir Khalid. The three studied, under different masters, the major streams of Islamic Education, which included Nahw (Classical Arabic), Tafseer (Qur'anic exegesis), Hadith, Sira (the traditions and life history of the Prophet), and other fields.

They returned to continue their education once again at the center of Sheikh Muhammad Rashid. There, Ahmad Taqi learned not only Islamic courses, but also the history, culture, and ethnography of the Oromo people. Furthermore, he increased his knowledge in traditional Arabian and African Medicine.

When he reached the age of 20, Ahmad Taqi moved to Gelemso town with his aforementioned brother, Muttaqi Sheikh Muhammad Rashid. They were joined by a third brother, Israfil. The three brothers started a business in the town, emerging as successful merchants in wholesale merchandising and the coffee trade. Throughout their career, all three brothers, especially Ahmad Taqi, would support the poor and students of the area.

== Career as an Oromo Nationalist ==
Later on, he came to know General Taddese Birru, one of the founders of Mecha and Tulama Self-Help Association, who was under house arrest at that time in Gelemso. Tadesse and Ahmad Taqi began to teach the people that they have rights equal to those of the landlords of the area, and that being Oromo is not a curse, but a virtue to love. On his frequent travels to Dire Dawa and Addis Ababa (Finfine), he was met by famous Oromo nationalists like Baro Tumsa, Jarra Abba Gada, and Ali Birra.

== Joining to Elemo Kiltu ==
In September 1974, Haile Selassie I was confronted by the Derg in the Ethiopian revolution, and responded by abdicating from rulership. Ahmed Taqi had previously helped Taddese Birru escape house arrest, bringing him to Addis Ababa by night. At his stay in Addis Ababa, he met the activist Hassan Ibrahim (also known as Elemo Kiltu which was his nom de guerre), who had returned from Syria to launch an armed struggle against the government. Elemo told Ahmad Taqi the idea of coming to Gelemso, and Ahmad Taqi accepted it.

== Armed struggle ==
In May 1974, Elemo went to Gelemso, and made necessary arrangements to launch armed struggle against government authorities. He visited Sheikh Mohammed Rashid, Ahmad Taqi's father, and the sheikh advised him to begin the struggle in the mountains of Guba Koricha (50 km north of Gelemso).

Elemo went with an army of 19 persons to Guba Koricha in June 1974. Then, he and his forces started to take measures against the rural landlords. They fought against the guards of Mulatu Tegegn, a notorious landlord who was harassing his Oromo tenants for higher rental shares of produce. Mulatu's guards killed Hajji Omar Khorchee instantly. The rebels then killed Mulatu and all his men, at a place called Hardim. Mulatu's dead body was brought to Gelemso. The landlord class were very angry, and vowed revenge. Local authorities started to detain suspects in the case. Ahmed Taqi was among the suspects, as he was prominent in preaching national pride and self governance for the Oromos.

Ahmad Taqi escaped arrest, and went to join the Oromo freedom army led by Elemo. As he was a merchant, he went with handful of money that might support the army with provisions. He met Elemo at a place called Bubbee (33 km away from Gelemso town on the top of Bubbe mountain). The necessary arrangements were made for the leadership. Elemo was chosen as the chairperson, and Ahmed Taqi was made the commander of the army.

The army of Oromo freedom fighters began more hostile actions and more resistance against the Ethiopian armed forces. Ahmed Taqi was given a nickname "Hundee" by his army. But the name had long been used by his father.

As the Ethiopian armed forces were seizing power from Haile Selassie in a military junta (Derg), they sent an army led by General Getachew Shibeshi eastward. The administrator of Harerghe, Colonel Zelleke Beyyene, then publicly vowed to destroy Gelemso if he could not kill Ahmad Taqi.

The search continued. Finally, on September 6, 1974, both armies met each other at Tiro (26 km East of Gelemso). Ahmad Taqi was killed at noon, and Elemo assumed command, continuing to fight the government forces with his few men until sunset. Finally the government forces managed to kill Elemo with mortar fire. Only three persons of his army survived the battle. Two of them are still alive.

== Prophecy of Ahmad Taqi's father ==
The father of Ahmad Taqi heard of the martyrdom of his son and said "My son is not dead. His blood is a seed to the future freedom of the Oromos. A seed will be a big tree one day. One day, the name Oromo will be known all over the world". As the sheikh said, the name Oromo is a pride for Oromos today. Ahmad Taqi is still remembered when the Oromo freedom struggle is mentioned.

Ahmad Taqi was never married. But he has many relatives and fans, including his elder brother Muteki Sheikh Mohammed.

== Ahmad Taqi and Elemo in art and literature ==
1. The famous singer Ali Birra immortalized Ahmad Taqi by singing for him. In his song, in a metaphoric way, Ali Birra says:

"Yaa Hundee Bareedaa- Yaa Fiixee Miidhagaa". (Hundee is Ahmad Taqi himself)

2. Theodros Mulatu, a well known Amharic novelist, used the movements led by Ahmad Taqi and Elemo for his book Akel-Dama, (the Bloody Land). However, Theodros is criticized for attaching the movement to EPRP (Ethiopian People's Revolutionary Party, commonly known as "Ihaappaa").

3. The Canadian-based Oromo singer Elemo Ali praised the martyrs of The Battle of Tiro in his album titled "Oromiyaa" which was released in 1992.
