= Freedom Friday =

Freedom Friday one of the few political opposition organizations in Eritrea as of 2017. Also known as the Arbi Harnet project, this opposition movement seeks to empower Eritreans to publicly challenge the Isaias Afwerki government. According to former diplomat Fathi Osman, there are approximately 5,000 activists out of 6 million Eritreans, and many choose to act in opposition before fleeing the oppressive country. This movement started under the "Empty the Street" Campaign, which was inspired by the Arab Spring movements. However, due to the political culture in Eritrea, youthful citizens were unable to gather to organize mass protests. The official date the movement began was November 11, 2011 when original members made calls and sent messages around the country to join in protesting for democratic changes. The movement as of 2020 is led by Ephrem Tewelde, and has managed to recruit and mobilise new members. Ephrem Tewelde and Tsigabu Asmelash send weekly radio program on short wave and satellite, focusing on the future Eritrea and presenting national plan that covers every aspect of the society. The movement claims that it is reaching new heights in introducing new projects to avail independent internet access for the entire nation. Freedom Friday is claimed to have mobilised community leaders that will help the transition from dictatorship to democracy.. The movement also strives to protect and enable freedom of speech, encouraging the expression of dissenting opinions and engage in open dialogue without fear of repression.

== Information oppression ==
This movement is based on the freedom of being able to spread information to one another. The political climate within the country places power tightly in the hands of the government and inhibits individual freedoms, including speech. In the "2018 World Press Freedom Index" by Reporters without borders, Eritrea outranked only one other country, that being North Korea. The organization goes on to say "For the past 26 years, Eritrea has been a dictatorship in which there is no room for freely reported news and information" and "Like everything else in Eritrea, the media are totally subject to the whim of President Issayas Afeworki, a predator of press freedom who is responsible for 'crimes against humanity,' according to a June 2016 UN report". President Issayas has full control over what information is published to the citizens of Eritrea, and the only way to receive information is to have it smuggled in, broadcast from a different country, or secretly receive information from the internet. In a Vice News Documentary published in 2017 the news organization said "Often referred to as Africa's North Korea, the Eritrean government controls the flow of information with vigilance, restricting any dissenting voices from reaching the people." With 1% of the countries population having internet access and only 6% having mobile phones information is easily censored, especially with Eritrean law forbidding independent media outlets. For a country with a population of 6 million, Eritrea only has one publishing newspaper, in which Eritrean refugees say "that's all you read".

== Resistance ==
Due to the strong power that the government holds in Eritrea, resistance, and spreading the message of resistance is extremely difficult. But unlike the militant resistance that is conducted by Red Sea Afar Democratic Organisation (RSADO), the Freedom Friday movement focuses on information campaigns. The main goals of the organization include "heighten the level of indignation against the regime's actions. Encourage people to go beyond the individual response of fleeing the country but seek a communal solution to the common problem. Support people in the search for actions that challenge the regime without putting people in danger as they build their confidence in challenging the regime. Link the opposition in diaspora to our people inside the country." The movement uses multiple outlets to spread their message ranging from independent radio stations broadcasting from different countries, to simple graffiti on Eritrean bank notes. This movement essentially coordinates underground activists within the country to spread information to the broad population, as well as provide video and information of what is being published by the governments media. Selam Kidane, a co-founder of the movement, frequently posts messages to social media including Facebook and Twitter in hopes to spread hope for individuals stuck within the oppressive country, but also in hopes that they will grow the will to rise up and resist the government in the streets of major cities. Although only 1% of the countries population has access to the internet, social media accounts for Eritrean resistance are numerous, and well supported. With a large separation between individuals and internet within the country, other methods of streaming hopeful messages has to take place. As done by Radio Erena, and Radio Assenna, they look to provide an independent information source to the population via satellite and radio. These along with others broadcast messages to Eritreans informing them of different events occurring in the world, as well as encouraging individuals to not flee the country and instead rebel. Yet both of these information sources also provide websites and publish articles in which they discuss and update information the current situations that are occurring within the country itself, for the international community to see. In 2012, Eritrean Youth Solidarity for Change (EYSC) stated that Freedom Friday participants in Eritrea carried out mass robo-calls to mobile phone numbers and landlines, and posted posters along with graffiti markings to encourage and positively support resistance to oppression.

== International involvement ==
Although Eritrea has been mentioned by many international leaders and organizations, little has been done to intervene. On June 8, 2015, the United Nations published a special inquiry detailing gross human rights violations within the country. At the Clinton Global Initiative in 2012, then-President Barack Obama mentioned that he renewed sanctions against the country as a result of continual human rights abuse. The United Kingdom Parliament held a debate on what action to take against the human rights abuse occurring within Eritrea. As well as former President Hollande of France spoke with great frustration on the severity of what is occurring. However, despite attention by recognizable international leaders, little has been done outside of publishing dissenting rhetoric. Little tangible support has been provided by the international community and has led to an increase in difficulty for the movement.

== See also ==
- Brigade Nhamedu
