= Jaarraa Abbaa Gadaa =

Ethiopian guerrilla commander (1936-2013)

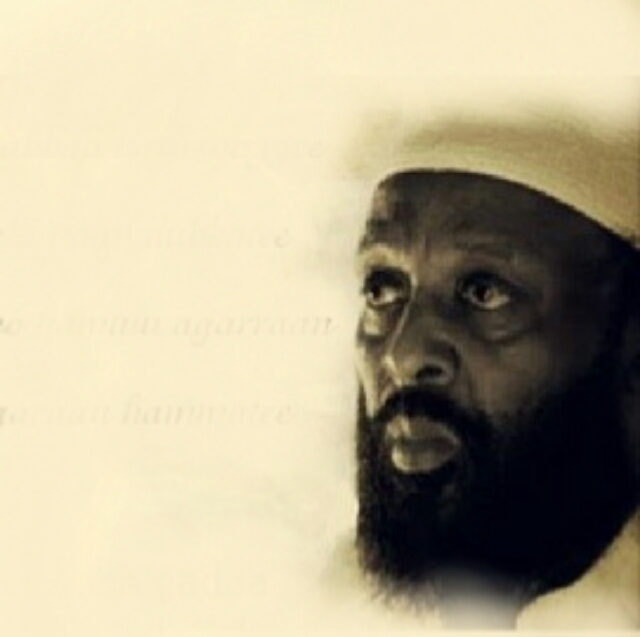
- Born: Abdulkariem Ibrahim Hamid; 1936; Mudir Gorro, Harerghe, Ethiopian Empire
- Died: March 2013 (aged 76–77); Sana'a, Yemen
- Occupations: Leader, guerrilla commander
- Organization(s): Oromo Liberation Front; Islamic Front for the Liberation of the Oromo
- Children: 2

Abdulkariem Ibrahim Hamid, more commonly known by his nom de guerre Jaarraa Abbaa Gadaa, was an Ethiopian guerrilla commander and one of the first leaders of the Oromo Liberation Front. In 1985, Jarrah and his allies slipt off from the OLF to form the Islamic Front for the Liberation of the Oromo (IFLO), Adda Islaamummaa Bilisummaa Oromoo (AIBO).
