= Ahmar Mountains =

Mountain range in the Ethiopian Highlands

Coordinates: 09°22′59″N 41°13′00″E

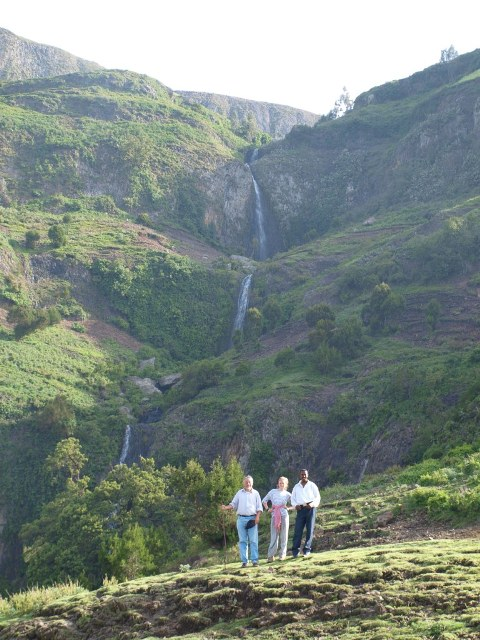

Highest point
- Peak: Kundudo
- Elevation: 3,380 m (11,090 ft)

Geography
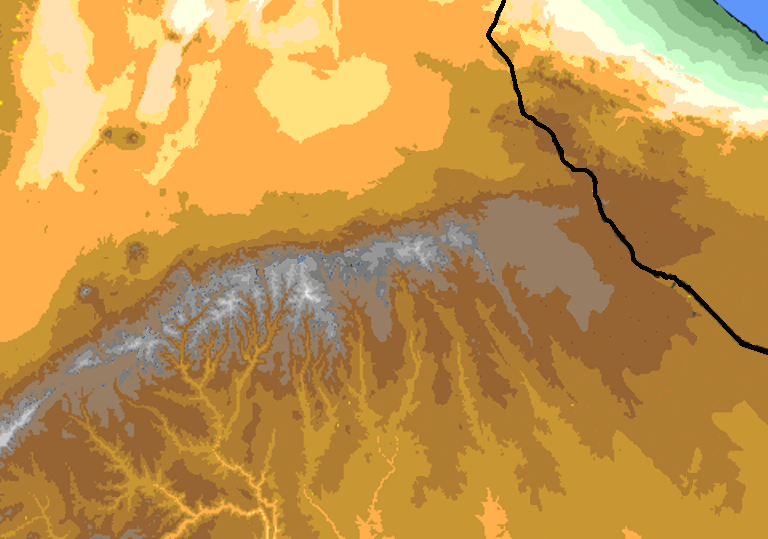
- Country: Ethiopia
- Region: Oromia Region

The Ahmar Mountains is a mountain range of the Ethiopian Highlands, located in the eastern Oromia Region of Ethiopia.

The range has an average elevation of 2,965 metres (9,728 ft) above sea level.

The mountain range is located approximately 11 km (7 mi) south of Dire Dawa, 12 km (7 mi) from Jijiga by road.

== History ==
This mountain was mentioned by the British explorer Richard F. Burton, whose party traveled along its northern base January 1854, on their way to Harar.

== Climate ==
Elevation is the major factor in temperature levels, with the higher areas, on average, 10 °C (50 °F) cooler, day or night. The temperature drops to roughly 50–53 °F (10–12 °C) at night.

The ecology of this landform is semi-desert. Numerous rock formations are found here. The Jubba and Shabelle rivers have their origins in this mountain range.
