= Mecha and Tulama Self-Help Association =

20th century Oromo-led social movement in Ethiopia

The Mecha and Tulema Self-Help Association (Oromo: Waldaa Wal-gargaarsa Maccaa fi Tuulamaa) was an Oromo political and freedom social movement in Ethiopia. The movement was primarily based in Bale, but was active in other regions as well (including Addis Ababa). The organization was accused of committing acts of terror by the Ethiopian government, in hopes of suppressing the Oromo National Movement that was developing at the time. The Association was established by Oromo nationalists like Mamo Mezemer, Haile Mariam Gemeda and Alemu Kitessa.

== History ==
Mecha and Tulema Self-Help Association is named after two of the major Borana Oromo clans Machaa and Tulema. It was established in the 1960s as a self-help club dedicated to promoting Oromo self-identity and providing basic infrastructures like school, health facilities, roads and water supplies to the Oromo people. As political parties were not allowed at the time, associations such as Mecha-Tulema often took on political roles.

The organization attempted to involve Oromos in both cities and the countryside. It was most successful in the south, Arsi in particular, where Oromos had been relegated to the status of tenants on their own land after being conquered by Menelik's forces. At the height of its development, Mecha-Tulema claimed as many as 200,000 members.

The most prominent leader of Mecha-Tulema was Tadesse Birru, a former general in the Ethiopian police force and the territorial army. He was from a Shewa Oromo family, having established himself in Amhara culture. Tadesse Birru appeared at organizational rallies in southern towns, delivering speeches critical of the government's policies towards Oromo areas and encouraging the people to demand justice. He linked his appeal to the "dignity of Oromo culture", a culture that, he emphasized, was being destroyed at the hands of Amhara. Other members associated with the organization included Beyene Abdi, an educator, former parliamentarian, judge, and Oromo civic leader who was later described by Amnesty International as a longtime official of the Mecha and Tulema welfare association.

By November 1966 the Haile Selassie regime became sufficiently alarmed at growth in the movement's popularity, and decided to arrest its top leadership including Tadesse Birru following a bomb explosion in an Addis Ababa movie house that was attributed to him. The Mecha-Tulama was banned shortly thereafter. Tadesse Birru was brought to trial in 1968 and condemned to death, a sentence later commuted to life in prison. Mamo Mezemir was also sentenced to death and he was executed on February 28, 1969.

The group that founded the Oromo Liberation Front in 1974 consisted largely of former members of this association.
