= Tadesse Birru =

Ethiopian military officer and civil right activist

General Tadesse Birru
- Taaddasee Birruu
- Tadesse Birru in 1962
- Born: 1921; Selale, Shewa Province, Ethiopian Empire
- Died: 19 March 1975 (aged 53–54); Addis Ababa, Socialist Ethiopia
- Spouse: Work-Abeba Gebre-Medhin
- Relatives: Almaz Tadesse Birru; Tsehay Tadesse Birru; Belete Tadesse Birru; Kassa II Tadesse Birru; Muse Tadesse Birru; Martha Tadesse Birru
- Military career
- Allegiance: Ethiopian Empire (1935–1963)
- Branch: Imperial Ethiopian Army
- Rank: General
- Nickname: Taaddee
- Unit: Fetno Derash (Special Forces)
- Conflicts: Second Italo-Abyssinian War; Oromo conflict

Tadesse Birru (1921 – 19 March 1975) was an Ethiopian military officer and civil rights activist. Initially a strong proponent of Ethiopian unity, Tadesse eventually became an activist for the empowerment of the Oromo people in the 1960s. His advocacy turned into repeated attempts to overthrow the government through a coup and later through a military rebellion. He was eventually captured and executed by the Derg regime. He is considered to be the father of modern Oromo nationalism.

== Life and career ==
=== Early life ===
Tadesse was born in Salele, in the Shewa province of the Ethiopian Empire during Emperor Haile Selassie's reign. His father, Birru, was killed by poison gas during the Second Italo-Ethiopian War and his mother died of grief three months later. Tadesse is of Tulama Oromo descent.

=== Military career ===
Left without a family, Tadesse joined his uncle, Beka, as a member of the Arbegnoch, an anti-fascist guerilla resistance movement of Ethiopian patriots who fought the Italian occupation. He was eventually captured and sentenced to life in prison with hard labor in Mogadishu, Somalia where he remained until the British captured Mogadishu in 1940. Tadesse was freed and given military training in Kenya and returned to Ethiopia in 1941. In 1942, Tadesse was promoted to the rank of second lieutenant and enrolled into the national military academy at Holota, where he served for years as an instructor.

In 1954, he was promoted to lieutenant colonel and he moved from the military to the police force and was in charge of modernizing it. He was made a commander of the "Fetno-Derash" (Special Forces) and was instrumental in crushing the 1960 coup attempt by proving the conspirators wrong through his loyalty to the Emperor. In February 1962 Nelson Mandela, the leader of the armed wing of the anti-apartheid African National Congress (ANC) of South Africa, came to Ethiopia to attend a meeting of the Pan-African Freedom Movement for East, Central and Southern Africa. Following Mandela's request, the Emperor ordered Tadesse Birru to give Mandela military training. After returning home, Mandela mobilized the ANC to start a clandestine armed struggle. Charged with the crime of travelling to Ethiopia without official permission, sabotage, high treason and conspiracy he was convicted to life imprisonment. During his 1990-visit to Ethiopia, the first person Mandela asked for was Tadesse Birru and he was saddened to hear his mentor's fate.

Tadesse Birru was promoted to Brigadier General by which time he was commander of the Fetno-Derash, the deputy commissioner of the National Police Force, the commander of the Territorial Army and the chairman of the National Literacy Campaign.

=== Mecha and Tulama Self-help Association ===
Despite initially rejecting the nationalist sentiments that existed among his people, the Oromo, General Tadesse Birru's views were changed during a talk with Prime Minister Aklilu Habtewold. As chairman of the National Literacy Campaign, Tadesse held a meeting with the Prime Minister during which Aklilu, not knowing Tadesse Birru's heritage, suggested that it was unwise to educate or recruit Oromos to the military. This is the comment that is believed to have influenced the general's decision to join the Mecha and Tulama Self-Help Association in early 1963, an Oromo social movement in which he went on to become a prominent figure.

His public image helped elevate the association's status and his organizational capacities and leadership qualities transformed the self-help organization into a pan-Oromo movement. Through the organization, Tadesse Birru, advocated the empowerment of Oromos through education and an emphasis on self-reliance. Following his example, many Oromo military officers, civilian officials, professional elites, businessmen and religious leaders joined the association. Many of these people had hidden the fact that they were Oromo before joining the association and joining it was seen as a reaffirmation of identity.

=== Opposition to government ===
Tadesse Birru's decision to join the association and the elevation of its status had angered the Emperor and his officials. Prime Minister Aklilu Habtewold especially began to consider Tadesse Birru a rival. The prime minister used a bombing in Addis Ababa and a rebellion started by Oromos in the Bale province as a pretext to ban the organization. Many of its members were arrested, killed, or exiled. Tadesse escaped the worst of repercussions but was put under house arrest from which he escaped after three years. He then plotted and attempted an unsuccessful coup in 1966 along with other high ranking Oromo soldiers during which they planned to assassinate the Emperor. He was arrested and severely tortured despite his old age. Initially he received capital punishment, but later on it was changed to life in prison.

In June 1974, Ethiopia was in turmoil as the imperial regime began to weaken. Tadesse took this chance and escaped from Gelemso and returned to Addis Ababa. The Derg, which was the military regime that took over the government, asked Tadesse to become Minister of the Interior which he refused. After a second refusal, the police were sent to detain him from which he escaped began to organize an armed Oromo rebellion in Shewa.

=== Death ===
Tadesse Birru led the rebels until he was captured along with Hailu Regassa. They were tried and were sentenced to life in prison but this was changed to execution by the Derg. Tadesse Birru, Hailu Regassa and a host of other Oromo leaders were executed on 19 March 1975 after Mengistu Haile Mariam falsely accused them of opposing the Derg's land reforms.

== Legacy ==
Tadesse Birru is considered by many of Oromos to be the father of modern Oromo nationalism. His lectures about Oromo identity and nationhood inspired an entire generation of Oromos and led to the reaffirmation of the Oromo culture, language and identity as well as the development of the Oromo independence movement.
