= Badessa, Oromia =

Bedessa Baddeeysaa (Oromo) በዴሳ
- Town
- Badesa
- Location within Ethiopia Bedessa (Africa)
- Coordinates: 8°54′N 40°47′E
- Country: Ethiopia
- Region: Oromia
- Zone: West Hararghe Zone

Government
  - Mayor: Abdalla Yusuuf
- Elevation: 1,761 m (5,778 ft)

Population (2007)
  - Total: 18,187
- Time zone: UTC+3 (EAT)

Badessa is a town and separate Aanaa in eastern Ethiopia. Located in the West Hararghe Zone of the Oromia Region, at the base of a spur of the Chercher Mountains 40 km south of the Addis Ababa - Djibouti Railway and 65 km east of Awash, this town has a latitude and longitude of 8°54′N 40°47′E with an elevation of 1761 m above sea level.

According to the local administration, the total population was 114,000 in 2022.

The 2007 national census reported a total population for this town of 18,187, of whom 9,592 were men and 8,595 were women. The majority of the inhabitants (64.49%) said they were Muslim, while 33.08% of the population practised Ethiopian Orthodox Christianity and 2.07% were Protestant.

The 1994 national census reported this town had a total population of 10,813 of whom 5,459 were males and 5,354 were females. It is the largest settlement in Oda bultum woreda.

A post office was in service in Badessa before the Second Italian-Abyssinian War, operating from 1923. Telephone service arrived no later than 1967. Mobile telephone service was introduced to Badessa May 2009.
