= Abiy Ahmed =

Prime Minister of Ethiopia since 2018

His Excellency Abiy Ahmed MEOPA
- ዐቢይ አሕመድ
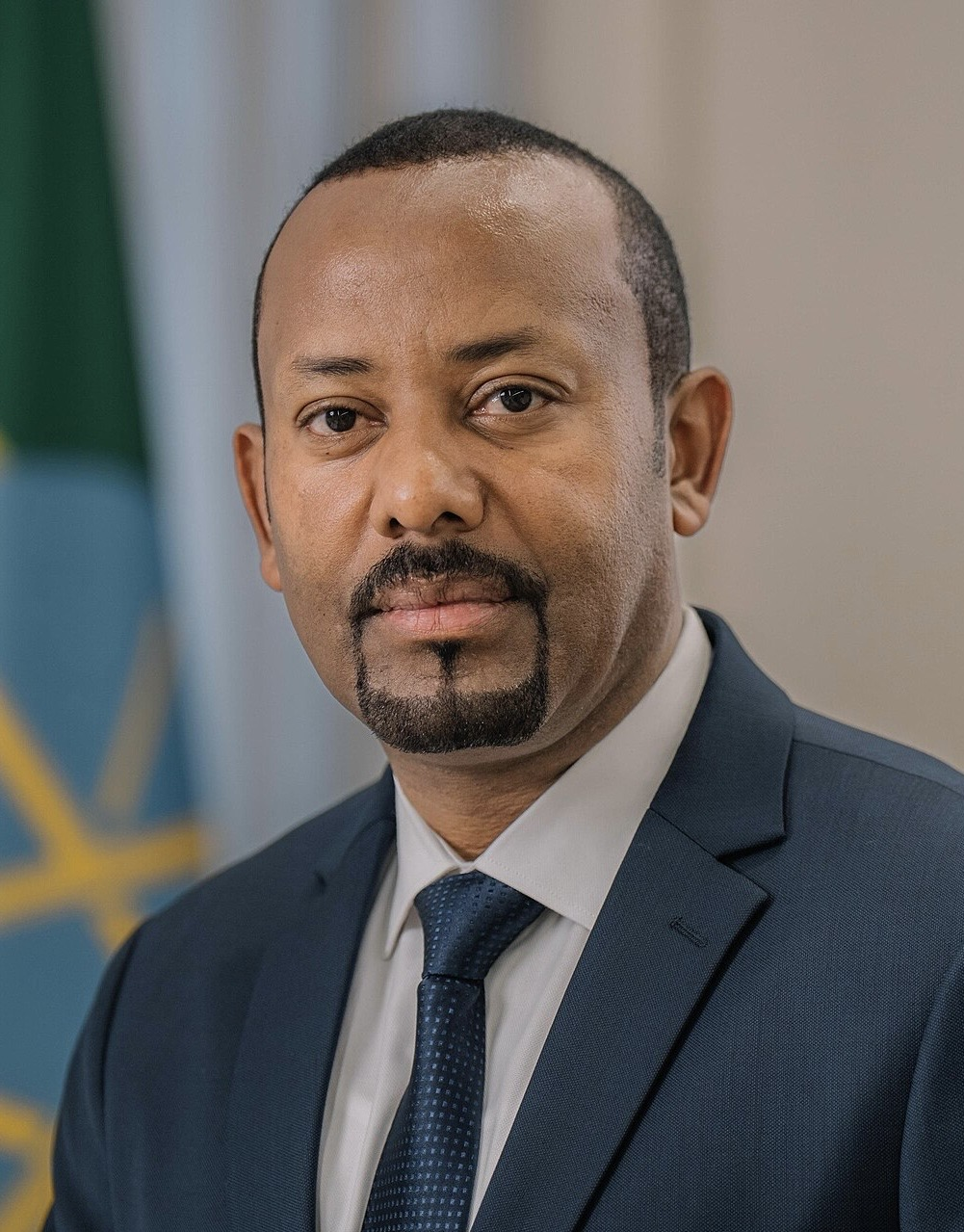
- Official portrait, 2025

Prime Minister of Ethiopia
- Incumbent
- Assumed office 2 April 2018
- President: Mulatu Teshome; Sahle-Work Zewde; Taye Atske Selassie
- Deputy: Temesgen Tiruneh; Adem Farah
- Preceded by: Hailemariam Desalegn

President of the Prosperity Party
- Incumbent
- Assumed office 1 December 2019
- Deputy: Temesgen Tiruneh; Adem Farah
- Preceded by: Party established
Previous party offices
3rd Chairman of the Ethiopian Peoples' Revolutionary Democratic Front
In office 27 March 2018 – 1 December 2019
Deputy	Demeke Mekonnen
Preceded by	Hailemariam Desalegn
Succeeded by	Party abolished
Leader of the Oromo Democratic Party
In office 22 February 2018 – 1 December 2019
Deputy	Lemma Megersa
Preceded by	Lemma Megersa
Succeeded by	Party abolished

Minister of Science and Technology
- In office 6 October 2015 – 1 November 2016
- Prime Minister: Hailemariam Desalegn
- Preceded by: Demitu Hambisa
- Succeeded by: Getahun Mekuria

Acting Director General of the Information Network Security Agency
- In office 2008–2015
- Preceded by: Teklebirhan Woldearegay
- Succeeded by: Temesgen Tiruneh

Personal details
- Born: Abiy Ahmed Ali; 15 August 1976 (age 50) Beshasha, Ethiopia
- Party: Prosperity
- Other political affiliations: EPRDF (until 2019); ODP (until 2019)
- Spouse: Zinash Tayachew
- Children: 4
- Education: Microlink Information Technology College (BA); University of Greenwich (MA); Leadstar College of Management and Leadership (MBA); Addis Ababa University (PhD)
- Awards: Nobel Peace Prize (2019)
- Website: pmo.gov.et/pm/

Military service
- Allegiance: Ethiopia
- Branch: Ethiopian Army
- Service years: 1991–2010
- Rank: Lieutenant Colonel
- Unit: Army Signals Corps
- Commands: INSA
- Conflicts / operations: Ethiopian Civil War; United Nations Assistance Mission for Rwanda; Eritrean–Ethiopian War

Abiy Ahmed Ali (Note: Oromo: Abiyi Ahmed Alii; Amharic: ዐቢይ አሕመድ ዐሊ) (born 15 August 1976) is an Ethiopian politician and former military officer who is the current prime minister of Ethiopia since 2018. He is also the leader of the Prosperity Party since 2019.

Abiy joined the rebel forces fighting against the regime of Mengistu Haile Mariam in his teens and after the collapse of the Derg in 1991, became a Lieutenant Colonel in the Ethiopian National Defense Force (ENDF). He served as a military radio operator during the Badme War against Eritrea from 1998 to 2000 and soon after converted to Pentecostal Christianity. He later rose through the ranks of government via the Information Network Security Agency (INSA), which was established in 2006. In the 2010 national election, Abiy became an elected member of the Ethiopian parliament, representing the district of Agaro. He was then elected Prime Minister by the House of Peoples' Representatives in 2018, following the dissolution of the Ethiopian People's Revolutionary Democratic Front (EPRDF) which had governed Ethiopia for 28 years.

Abiy initially embarked on sweeping political reforms, releasing thousands of political prisoners and unbanning opposition groups. He was awarded the 2019 Nobel Peace Prize "for his efforts to achieve peace and international cooperation, and in particular for his decisive initiative to resolve the border conflict with neighbouring Eritrea". As part of his economic reforms, Abiy pursued large-scale privatisation of state-owned enterprises and liberalised several key sectors, including the Ethiopian Airlines. In 2019, he disbanded the EPRDF and formed his own party, the Prosperity Party.

Following rising ethnic and political tensions in 2020, the Tigray People's Liberation Front (TPLF) attacked the Ethiopian National Defense Force (ENDF) Northern Command, starting the 2-year Tigray War between the combined forces of the ENDF and the Eritrean army against forces loyal to the TPLF and the Oromo Liberation Army (OLA). The war resulted in severe humanitarian crises, widespread displacement, and thousands of deaths. After the Pretoria Agreement ended the Tigray War, Abiy began an effort in 2023 to consolidate all remaining regional militias into the ENDF. Fano rebuffed requests to disarm and integrate into federal forces, instead attacking the ENDF and beginning the War in Amhara.

Since 2019, Ethiopia has undergone democratic backsliding under Abiy's premiership, marked by severe human rights violations, media censorship, internet shutdown, civil conflicts, systematic persecution, and ethnic violence in the Tigray, Amhara and Oromia regions. Politically motivated purges also became common and many journalists and activists were arrested by police for alleged breach of "constitutional laws".

== Early life ==
Abiy Ahmed was born in the small town of Beshasha, Ethiopia. His father, Ahmed Ali, was a respected Muslim Oromo elder who donated much of the land to build a mosque during the reign of Haile Selassie. While his mother, Tezeta Wolde, lived in a dilapidated house and sold traditional tej wine for a living. In a 2018 interview with The New York Times, Abiy stated that his mother "was Amhara and Orthodox Christian" and "converted to Islam when she married". However, in a 2021 Oromia Broadcasting Network interview redistributed on YouTube, Abiy asserted that his parents were both Oromo.

Abiy is the 13th child of his father and the sixth and youngest child of his mother, the fourth of his father's four wives. His childhood name was Abiyot (English: "Revolution"). The name was sometimes given to children in the aftermath of the Ethiopian Revolution in the mid-1970s. As a child, Abiy was sent to Agaro to attend the local primary school and later continued his studies at local secondary school in Agaro town. According to several personal reports, Abiy seems to have earned a reputation as a troublemaker with a poor record in school. He later dropped out in the seventh grade and then moved to Addis Ababa.

== Military and intelligence career ==
At the age of 14, in early 1991, he joined the armed struggle against the Marxist–Leninist regime of Mengistu Haile Mariam after the death of his oldest brother. He was a child soldier, affiliated to the Oromo People's Democratic Organization (OPDO), which at that time was a tiny organization of only around 200 fighters part of the large coalition army of the EPRDF which had over 100,000 fighters that resulted in the regime's fall later that year. As there were only so few OPDO fighters in an army with its core of about 90,000 Tigrayans, Abiy quickly had to learn the Tigrinya language. As a speaker of Tigrinya in a security apparatus dominated by Tigrayans, he could move forward with his military career.

After the fall of the Derg, he took formal military training from Assefa Brigade in West Wollega and was stationed there. Later on in 1993 he became a soldier in the now Ethiopian National Defense Force and worked mostly in the intelligence and communications departments. In 1995, after the Rwandan genocide, he was deployed as a member of the United Nations Assistance Mission for Rwanda (UNAMIR) in the country's capital, Kigali.

In the Eritrean–Ethiopian War that occurred between 1998 and 2000, he led an intelligence team to discover positions of the Eritrean Defence Forces. During the final days of the war in June 2000, he narrowly escaped an Eritrean artillery attack which had killed most his unit. Abiy later recounted to fellow churchmen that it had been the moment he had a revelation and decided to convert to Pentecostal Christianity.

Later on, Abiy was posted back to his home town of Beshasha, where he – as an officer of the Defense Forces – had to address a critical situation of inter-religious clashes between Muslims and Christians with a number of deaths. He brought calm and peace in a situation of communal tensions accompanying the clashes. In later years, following his election as an MP, he continued these efforts to bring about reconciliation between the religions through the creation of the Religious Forum for Peace.

=== INSA ===
In 2006, Abiy was one of the co-founders of the Information Network Security Agency (INSA), where he worked in different positions. The Ethiopian government established INSA with support from the United States, modeling it after the American's National Security Agency (NSA). Initially the agency was tasked with intercepting and analyzing intelligence, particularly from neighboring Somalia at the time of the US backed 2006 invasion, but the agency gradually expanded its role into domestic surveillance. Through INSA, Abiy Ahmed ascended through the ranks of government and became influential politically. For two years, he was acting director of INSA due to the director's leave of absence. In this capacity, he was board member of several government agencies working on information and communications, like Ethio telecom and Ethiopian Television. He attained the rank of Lieutenant colonel before deciding in 2010 to leave the military and his post as deputy director of INSA to become a politician.

== Political career ==
=== Member of Parliament ===
Abiy started his political career as a member of the Oromo Democratic Party (ODP). The ODP has been the ruling party in Oromia Region since 1991 and also one of four coalition parties of the ruling coalition in Ethiopia, the Ethiopian People's Revolutionary Democratic Front (EPRDF). He became a member of the central committee of ODP and congress member of the executive committee of the EPRDF in quick succession. In the 2010 national election, Abiy represented the district of Agaro and became an elected member of the House of Peoples' Representatives, the lower chamber of the Ethiopian Federal Parliamentary Assembly. Before and during his time of parliamentary service, there were several religious clashes among Muslims and Christians in Jimma Zone. Some of these confrontations turned violent and resulted in the loss of life and property. Abiy, as an elected member of parliament took a proactive role in working with several religious institutions and elders to bring about reconciliation in the zone. He helped set up a forum entitled "Religious Forum for Peace", an outcome of the need to devise a sustainable resolution mechanism to restore peaceful Muslim-Christian community interaction in the region.

In 2014, during his time in parliament, Abiy became the director-general of a new and in 2011 founded Government Research Institute called Science and Technology Information Center (STIC). The following year, Abiy became an executive member of ODP. The same year he was elected to the House of Peoples' Representatives for a second term, this time for his home woreda of Gomma.

=== Rise to power ===
Starting from 2015, Abiy became one of the central figures in the violent fight against illegal land grabbing activities in Oromia Region and especially around Addis Ababa. Although the Addis Ababa Master Plan at the heart of the land-grabbing plans was stopped in 2016, the disputes continued for some time resulting in injuries and deaths. It was this fight against land-grabbing, that finally boosted Abiy Ahmed's political career, brought him into the spotlight and allowed him to climb the political ladder.

In October 2015, Abiy became the Ethiopian Minister of Science and Technology (MoST), a post which he left after only 12 months. From October 2016 on, Abiy served as Deputy President of Oromia Region as part of the team of Oromia Region's president Lemma Megersa while staying a member of the Ethiopian Federal House of Peoples' Representatives. Abiy Ahmed also became the head of the Oromia Urban Development and Planning Office. In this role, Abiy was expected to be the major driving force behind Oromia Economic Revolution, Oromia Land and Investment reform, youth employment as well as resistance to widespread land grabbing in Oromia region. As one of his duties in office, he took care of the one million displaced Oromo people displaced from the Somali Region from the 2017 unrest.

As head of the ODP Secretariat from October 2017, Abiy facilitated the formation of a new alliance between the Oromo and Amhara groups, which together constitute two-thirds of the Ethiopian population.

In early 2018, many political observers considered Abiy and Lemma Megersa as the most popular politicians within the Oromo community, as well as other Ethiopian communities. This came after several years of unrest in Ethiopia. But despite this favourable rating for Abiy Ahmed and Lemma Megersa, young people from the Oromia region called for immediate action without delays to bring fundamental change and freedom to Oromia Region and Ethiopia – otherwise more unrest was to be expected. According to Abiy himself, people are asking for a different rhetoric, with an open and respectful discussion in the political space to allow political progress and to win people for democracy instead of pushing them.

Until early 2018, Abiy continued to serve as head of the ODP secretariat and of the Oromia Housing and Urban Development Office and as Deputy President of Oromia Region. He left all these posts after his election as the leader of the Ethiopian People's Revolutionary Democratic Front.

=== EPRDF leadership election ===
Following three years of protest and unrest, on 15 February 2018 the Ethiopian Prime Minister, Hailemariam Desalegn, announced his resignation – which included his resignation from the post of EPRDF chairman. With the EPRDF's large majority in Parliament, its EPRDF chairman was all but assured of becoming the next Prime Minister. The EPRDF chairman, on the other hand, is one of the heads of the four parties that make up the ruling coalition: Oromo Democratic Party (ODP), Amhara Democratic Party (ADP), Southern Ethiopian People's Democratic Movement (SEPDM) and Tigray People's Liberation Front (TPLF).

Hailemariam's resignation triggered the first ever contested leadership election among EPRDF coalition members to replace him. A lot of political observers made Lemma Megersa (the ODP chairman) and Abiy Ahmed the front-runners to become the Leader of the ruling coalition and eventually Prime Minister of Ethiopia. Despite being the clear favorite for the general public, Lemma Megersa was not a member of the national parliament, a requirement to become Prime Minister as required by the Ethiopian constitution. Therefore, Lemma Megersa was excluded from the leadership race. On 22 February 2018, Lemma Megersa's party, ODP, called for an emergency executive committee meeting and replaced him as Chairman of ODP with Abiy Ahmed, who was a member of parliament. Some observers saw that as a strategic move by the ODP to retain its leadership role within the coalition and to promote Abiy Ahmed to become prime minister.

On 1 March 2018, the 180 EPRDF executive committee members started their meeting to elect the leader of the party. Each of the four parties sent in 45 members. The contest for the leadership was among Abiy Ahmed of ODP, Demeke Mekonnen, the Deputy Prime Minister and ADP leader, Shiferaw Shigute as Chairman of SEPDM and Debretsion Gebremichael as the Leader of TPLF. Despite being the overwhelming favorite by the majority of Ethiopians, Abiy Ahmed faced major opposition from TPLF and SEPDM members during the leadership discussions.

On 27 March 2018, a few hours before the beginning of the leadership elections, Demeke Mekonnen, who had been seen as the major opponent to Abiy Ahmed, dropped out of the race. Many observers saw this as an endorsement of Abiy Ahmed. Demeke was then approved as deputy prime minister for another term. Following Demeke's exit, Abiy Ahmed received a presumably unanimous vote from both the ADP and ODP executive members, with 18 additional votes in a secret ballot coming from elsewhere. By midnight, Abiy Ahmed was declared chairman of the ruling coalition in Ethiopia, the EPRDF, and was considered as the Prime Minister Designate of Ethiopia by receiving 108 votes while Shiferaw Shigute received 58 and Debretsion Gebremichael received 2 votes. On 2 April 2018, Abiy Ahmed was elected as Prime Minister of Ethiopia by the House of Representatives and sworn in.

== Prime Minister of Ethiopia ==
On 2 April 2018, Abiy was confirmed and sworn in by the Ethiopian parliament as Prime Minister of Ethiopia. During his acceptance speech, he promised political reform; to promote the unity of Ethiopia and unity among the peoples of Ethiopia; to reach out to the Eritrean government to resolve the ongoing Eritrean–Ethiopian border conflict after the Eritrean–Ethiopian War and to also reach out to the political opposition inside and outside of Ethiopia. His acceptance speech sparked optimism and received an overwhelmingly positive reaction from the Ethiopian public including the opposition groups inside and outside Ethiopia. Following his speech, his popularity and support across the country reached a historical high and some political observers argued that Abiy was overwhelmingly more popular than the ruling party coalition, the EPRDF.

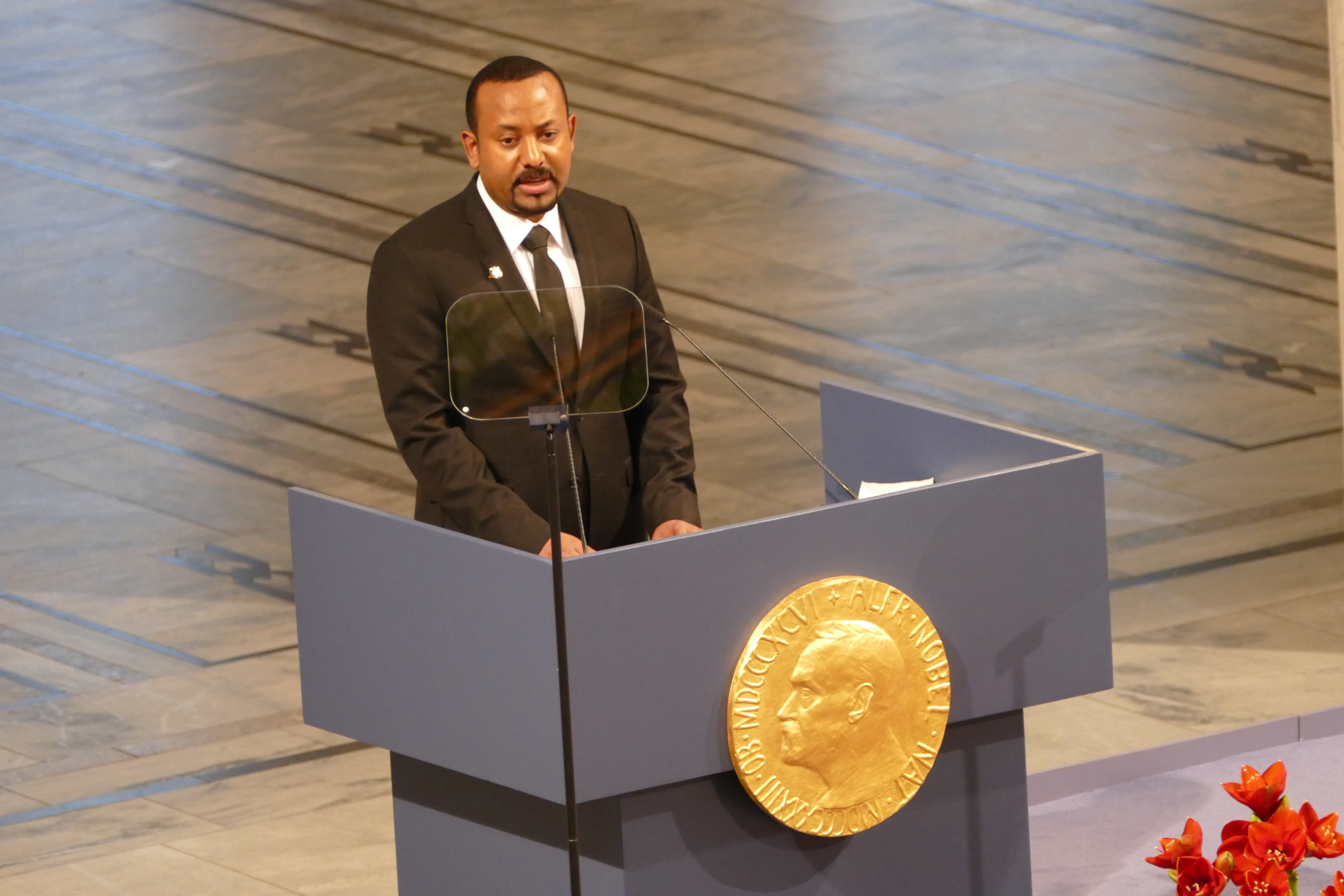
Abiy delivering his acceptance speech after receiving the 2019 Nobel Peace Prize

=== Domestic policy ===
Since taking office in April 2018, Abiy's government has presided over the release of thousands of political prisoners from Ethiopian jails and the rapid opening of the country's political landscape. In May 2018 alone the Oromo region pardoned over 7,600 prisoners. On 29 May Ginbot 7 leader Andargachew Tsege, facing the death penalty on terrorism charges, was released after being pardoned by President Mulatu Teshome, along with 575 other detainees.

That same day, charges were dropped against Andargachew's colleague Berhanu Nega and the Oromo dissident and public intellectual Jawar Mohammed, as well as their respectively affiliated US-based ESAT and OMN satellite television networks. Shortly thereafter, Abiy took the "unprecedented and previously unimaginable" step of meeting Andargachew, who twenty-four hours previously had been on death row, at his office; a move even critics of the ruling party termed "bold and remarkable". Abiy had previously met former Oromo Liberation Front leaders including founder Lencho Letta, who had committed to peaceful participation in the political process, upon their arrival at Bole International Airport.

On 30 May 2018, it was announced the ruling party would amend the country's "draconian" anti-terrorism law, widely perceived as a tool of political repression. On 1 June 2018, Abiy announced the government would seek to end the state of emergency two months in advance of the expiration its six-month tenure, citing an improved domestic situation. On 4 June 2018, Parliament approved the necessary legislation, ending the state of emergency. In his first briefing to the House of Peoples' Representatives in June 2018, Abiy countered criticism of his government's release of convicted "terrorists" which according to the opposition is just a name the EPRDF gives you if you are a part or even meet the "opposition". He argued that policies that sanctioned arbitrary detention and torture themselves constituted extra-constitutional acts of terror aimed at suppressing opposition. This followed the additional pardon of 304 prisoners (289 of which had been sentenced on terrorism-related charges) on 15 June.

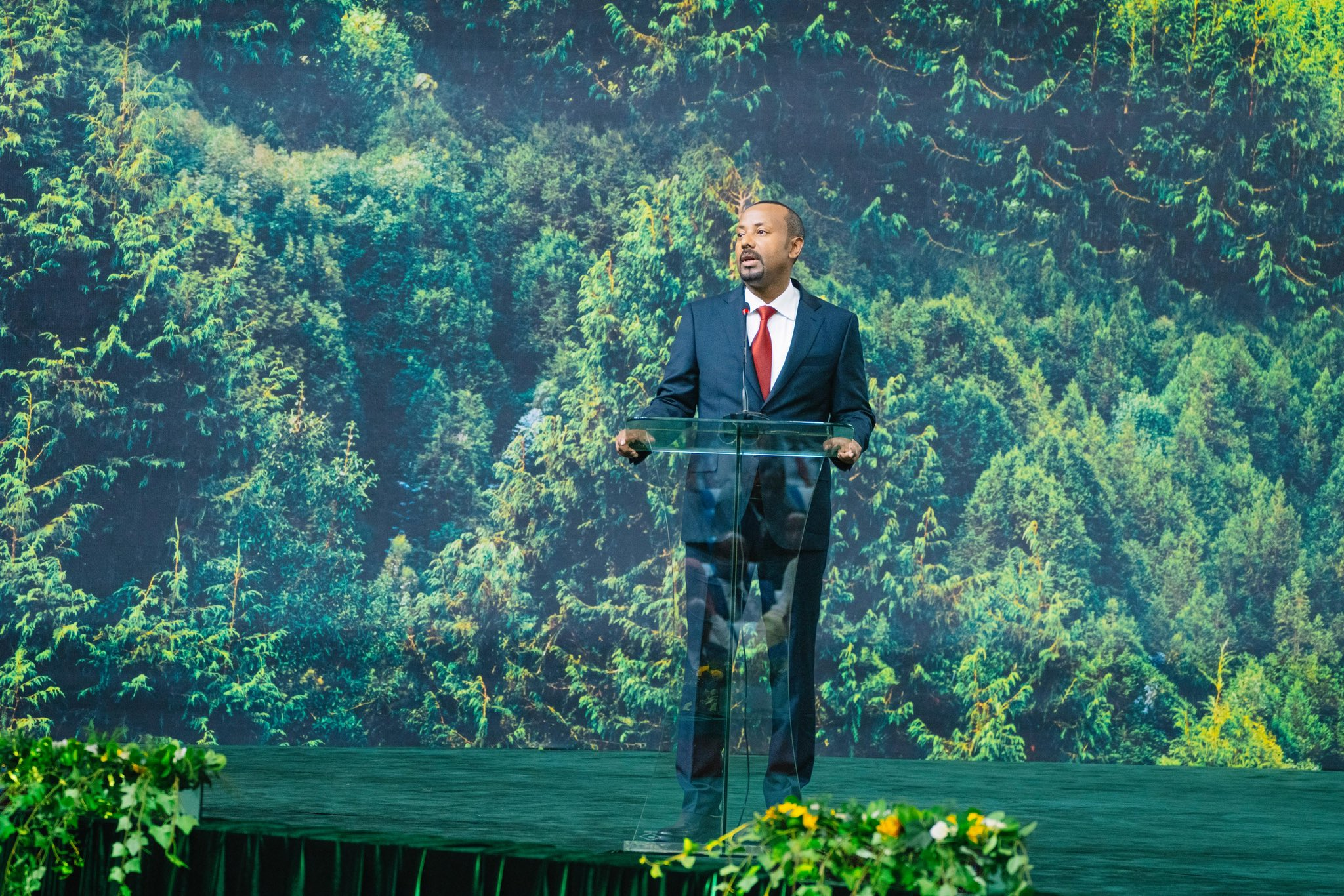
Abiy speaking at the Green Legacy Initiative, Addis Ababa, 21 June 2024

The pace of reforms has revealed fissures within the ruling coalition, with hardliners in the military and the hitherto dominant TPLF said to be "seething" at the end of the state of emergency and the release of political prisoners.

An editorial on the previously pro-government website Tigrai Online arguing for the maintenance of the state of emergency gave voice to this sentiment, saying that Abiy was "doing too much too fast". Another article critical of the release of political prisoners suggested that Ethiopia's criminal justice system had become a revolving door and that Abiy's administration had quite inexplicably been rushing to pardon and release thousands of prisoners, among them many deadly criminals and dangerous arsonists. On 13 June 2018, the TPLF executive committee denounced the decisions to hand over Badme and privatize SOEs as "fundamentally flawed", saying that the ruling coalition suffered from a fundamental leadership deficit.

=== Transparency ===
In 2018, to expand the free press in Ethiopia, Abiy invited exiled media outlets to return. One of the media outlets invited to return was ESAT (which had called for the genocide of Ethiopian Tigrayans). However, since assuming office in April 2018, Abiy himself had, as of March 2019, only given one press conference, on 25 August 2018 and around five months after he assumed office, where he answered questions from journalists. As of 21 March 2019, he has not given another press conference where he has not refused to answer questions from journalists (rather than reading prepared statements).

According to the NGOs Human Rights Watch, Committee to Protect Journalists and Amnesty International, Abiy's government has since mid 2019 been arresting Ethiopian journalists and closing media outlets (except for ESAT-TV). From the international media outlets, his government has suspended the press license of Reuters's correspondent, and issued a warning letter to the correspondents of both BBC and Deutsche Welle for what the government described as "violation of the rules of media broadcasting". As of June 2022, 18 journalists were arrested on allegation of "inciting violence" while reporting for independent media outlets or YouTube channels.

=== Economic reforms ===
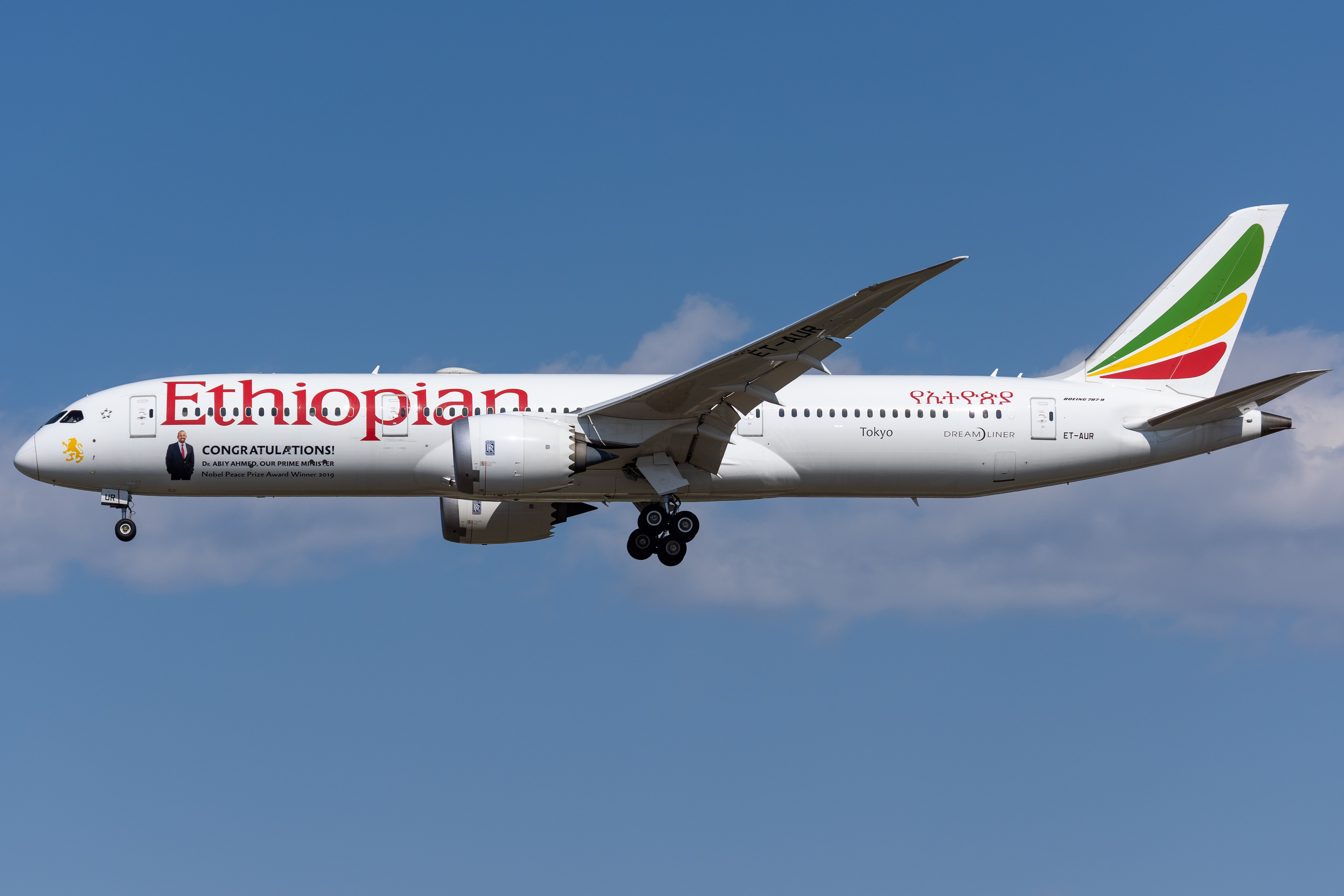
Abiy has announced that state-owned enterprises such as Ethiopian Airlines are to be partially or wholly privatised.

In June 2018, the ruling coalition announced its intention to pursue the large-scale privatisation of state-owned enterprises and the liberalization of several key economic sectors long considered off-limits, marking a landmark shift in the country's state-oriented development model.

State monopolies in the telecommunications, aviation, electricity, and logistics sectors are to be ended and those industries opened up to private sector competition. Shares in the state-owned firms in those sectors, including Ethiopian Airlines, Africa's largest and most profitable, are to be offered for purchase to both domestic and foreign investors, although the government will continue to hold a majority share in these firms, thereby retaining control of the commanding heights of the economy. State-owned enterprises in sectors deemed less critical, including railway operators, sugar, industrial parks, hotels and various manufacturing firms, may be fully privatised.

Aside from representing an ideological shift with respect to views on the degree of government control over the economy, the move was seen as a pragmatic measure aimed at improving the country's dwindling foreign-exchange reserves, which by the end of the 2017 fiscal year were equal in value to less than two months worth of imports, as well as easing its growing sovereign debt load.

In June 2018, Abiy announced the government's intention to establish an Ethiopian stock exchange in tandem with the privatization of state-owned enterprises. As of 2015, Ethiopia was the largest country in the world, in terms of both population and gross domestic product, without a stock exchange.

=== Foreign policy ===
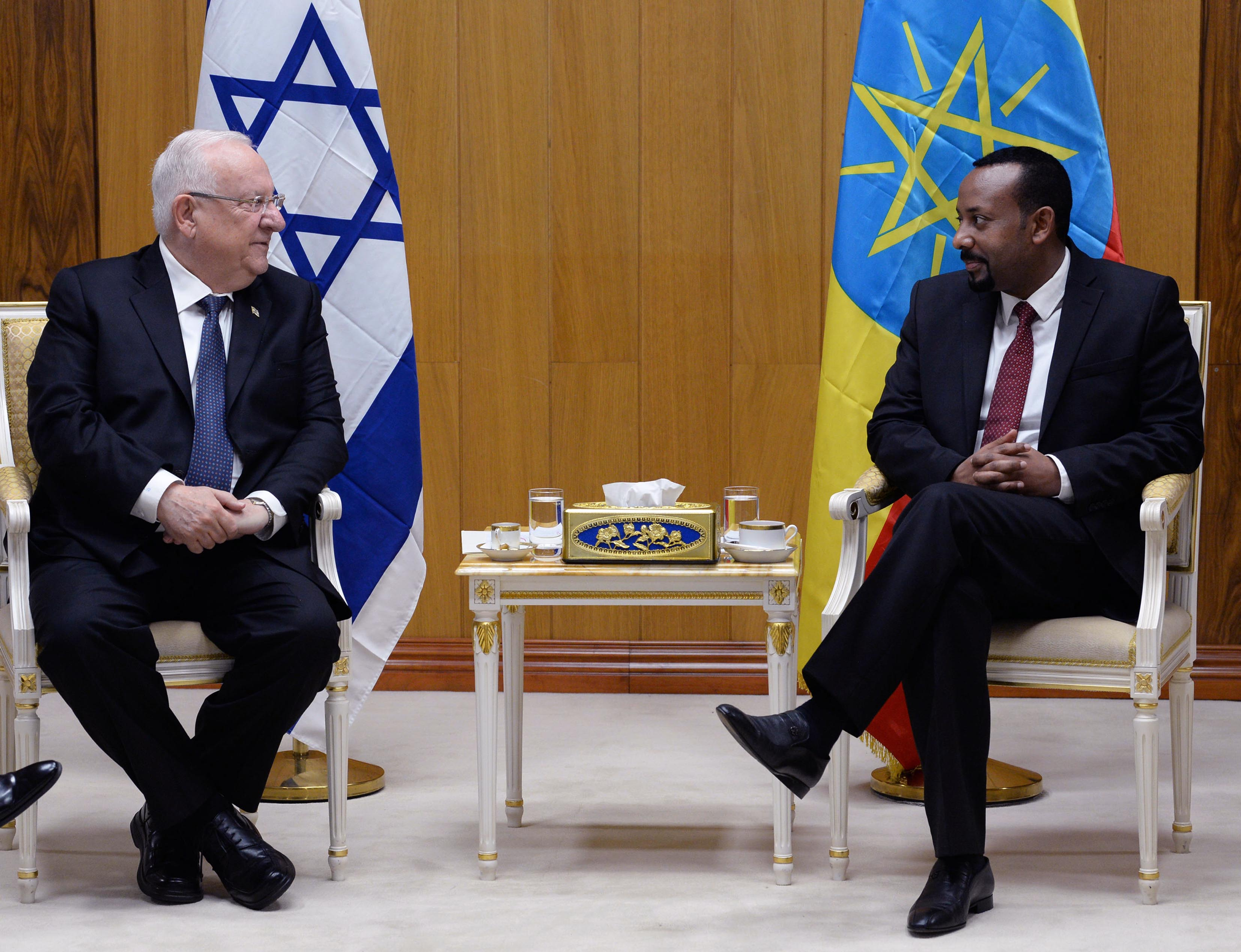
Abiy and Israeli President Reuven Rivlin in May 2018

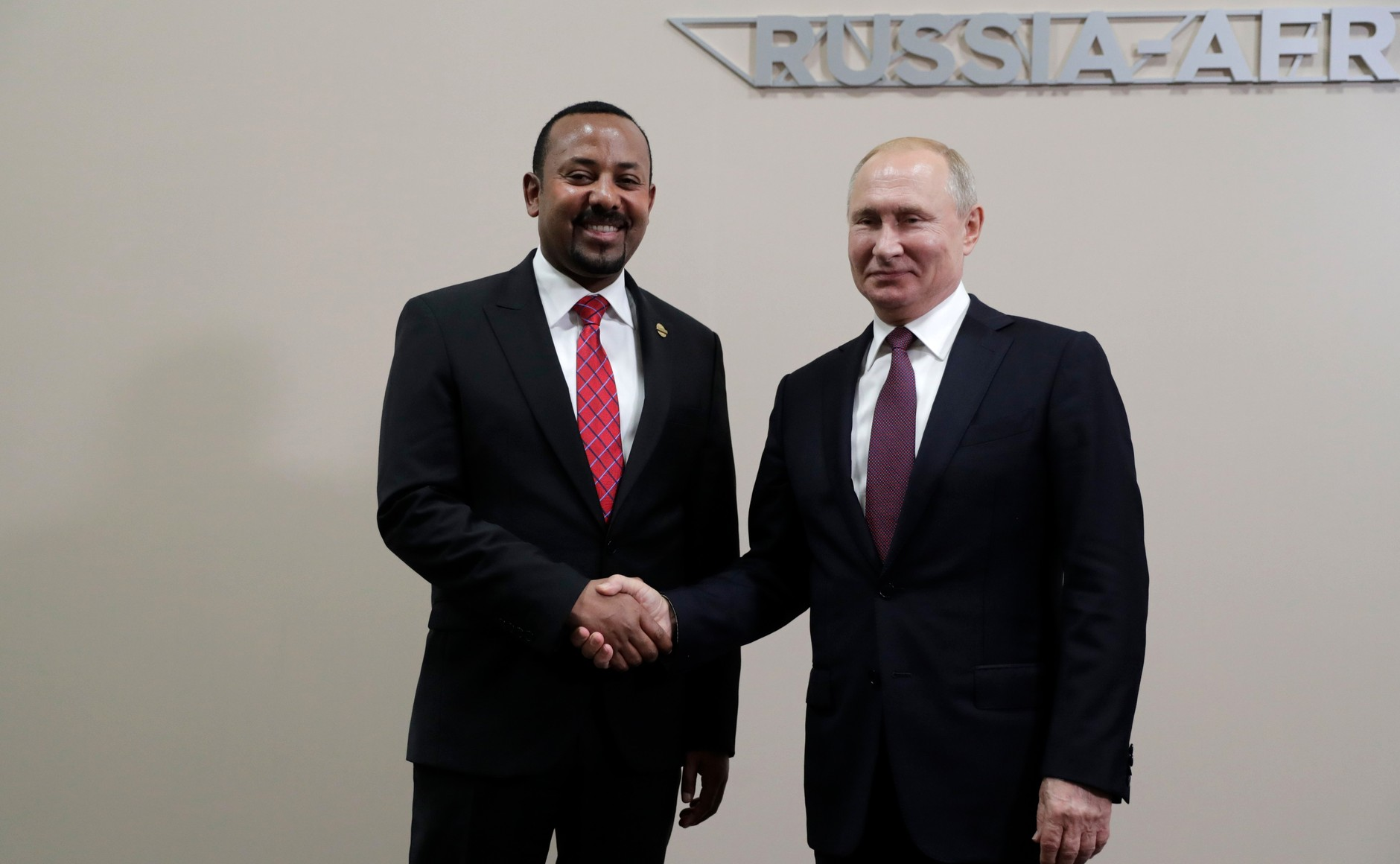
Abiy and Russian President Vladimir Putin at the Russia-Africa Summit in Sochi in October 2019

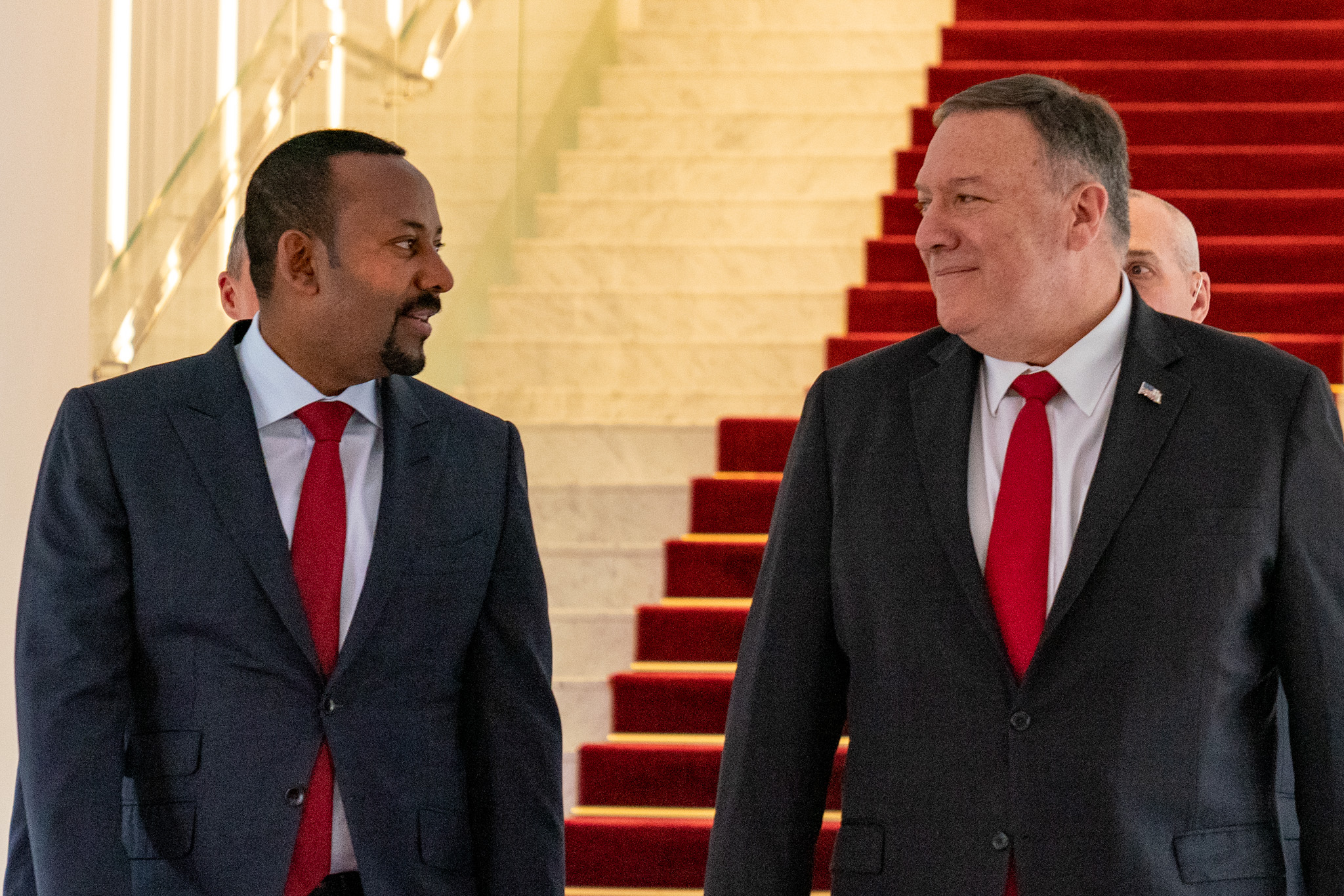
Abiy with U.S. Secretary of State Mike Pompeo in February 2020

In May 2018, Abiy visited Saudi Arabia, receiving guarantees for the release of Ethiopian prisoners including billionaire entrepreneur Mohammed Hussein Al Amoudi, who was detained following the 2017 Saudi Arabian purge.

In June 2018, he met with Egyptian President Abdel Fattah el-Sisi in Cairo and, separately, brokered a meeting in Addis Ababa between the South Sudanese president Salva Kiir and rebel leader Riek Machar in an attempt to encourage peace talks.

In December 2022, he attended the United States–Africa Leaders Summit 2022 in Washington, D.C., and met with US President Joe Biden.

In February 2023, French President Emmanuel Macron welcomed Abiy Ahmed in Paris. In April 2023, Abiy met with Italian Prime Minister Giorgia Meloni in Addis Ababa. In early May 2023, German Chancellor Olaf Scholz met with Abiy Ahmed in Addis Ababa to normalize relations between Germany and Ethiopia that had been strained by the Tigray War.

In July 2023, Abiy attended the 2023 Russia–Africa Summit in Saint Petersburg and met with Russian President Vladimir Putin.

==== Djibouti and port agreements ====
Since taking power Abiy has pursued a policy of expanding landlocked Ethiopia's access to ports in the Horn of Africa region. Shortly before his assumption of office it was announced that the Ethiopian government would take a 19% stake in Berbera Port in the Somaliland region located in northern Somalia as part of a joint venture with DP World. In May 2018, Ethiopia signed an agreement with the government of Djibouti to take an equity stake in the Port of Djibouti, enabling Ethiopia to have a say in the port's development and the setting of port handling fees.

Two days later a similar agreement was signed with the Sudanese government granting Ethiopia an ownership stake in the Port Sudan. The Ethio-Djibouti agreement grants the Djiboutian government the option of taking stakes in state-owned Ethiopian firms in return, such as the Ethiopian Airlines and Ethio Telecom. This in turn was followed shortly thereafter by an announcement that Abiy and Kenyan President Uhuru Kenyatta had reached an agreement for the construction of an Ethiopian logistics facility at Lamu Port as part of the Lamu Port and Lamu-Southern Sudan-Ethiopia Transport Corridor (LAPSSET) project. The potential normalization of Ethiopia-Eritrea relations likewise opens the possibility for Ethiopia to resume using the Ports of Massawa and Asseb, which, prior to the Ethio-Eritrean conflict, were its main ports, which would be of particular benefit to the northern region of Tigray. All these developments would reduce Ethiopian reliance on Djibouti's port which, since 1998, has handled almost all of Ethiopia's maritime traffic.

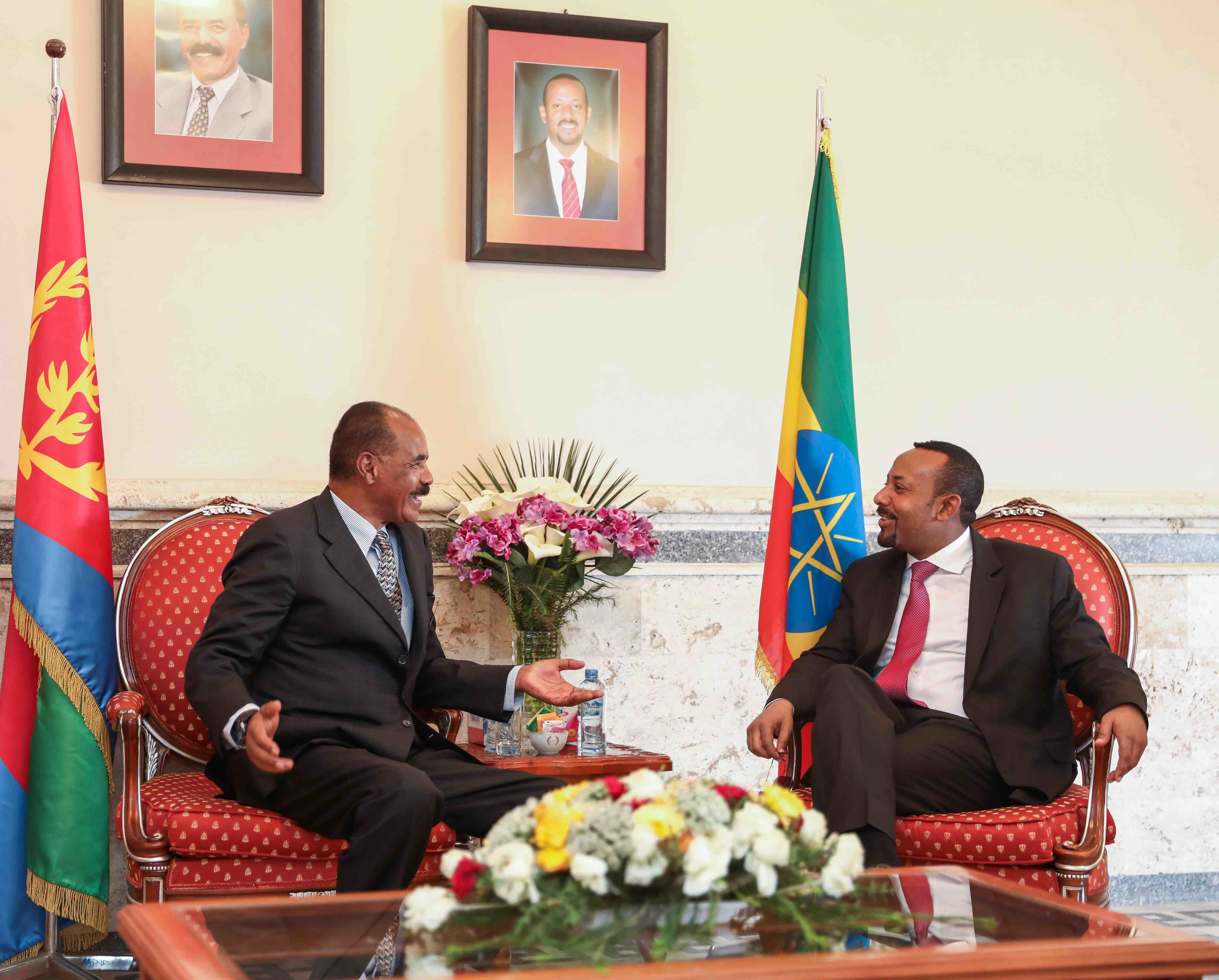
Abiy with Eritrean President Isaias Afwerki in March 2019

==== Eritrea ====
Upon taking office, Abiy stated his willingness to negotiate an end to the Ethio-Eritrean conflict. In June 2018, it was announced that the government had agreed to hand over the disputed border town of Badme to Eritrea, thereby complying with the terms of the 2000 Algiers Agreement to bring an end to the state of tension between Eritrea and Ethiopia that had persisted despite the end of hostilities during the Ethiopia-Eritrea War. Ethiopia had until then rejected the international boundary commission's ruling awarding Badme to Eritrea, resulting in a frozen conflict (popularly termed a policy of "no war, but no peace") between the two states.

During the national celebration on 20 June 2018, the president of Eritrea, Isaias Afwerki, accepted the peace initiative put forward by Abiy and suggested that he would send a delegation to Addis Ababa. On 26 June 2018, Eritrean Foreign Minister Osman Saleh Mohammed visited Addis Ababa in the first Eritrean high-level delegation to Ethiopia in over two decades.

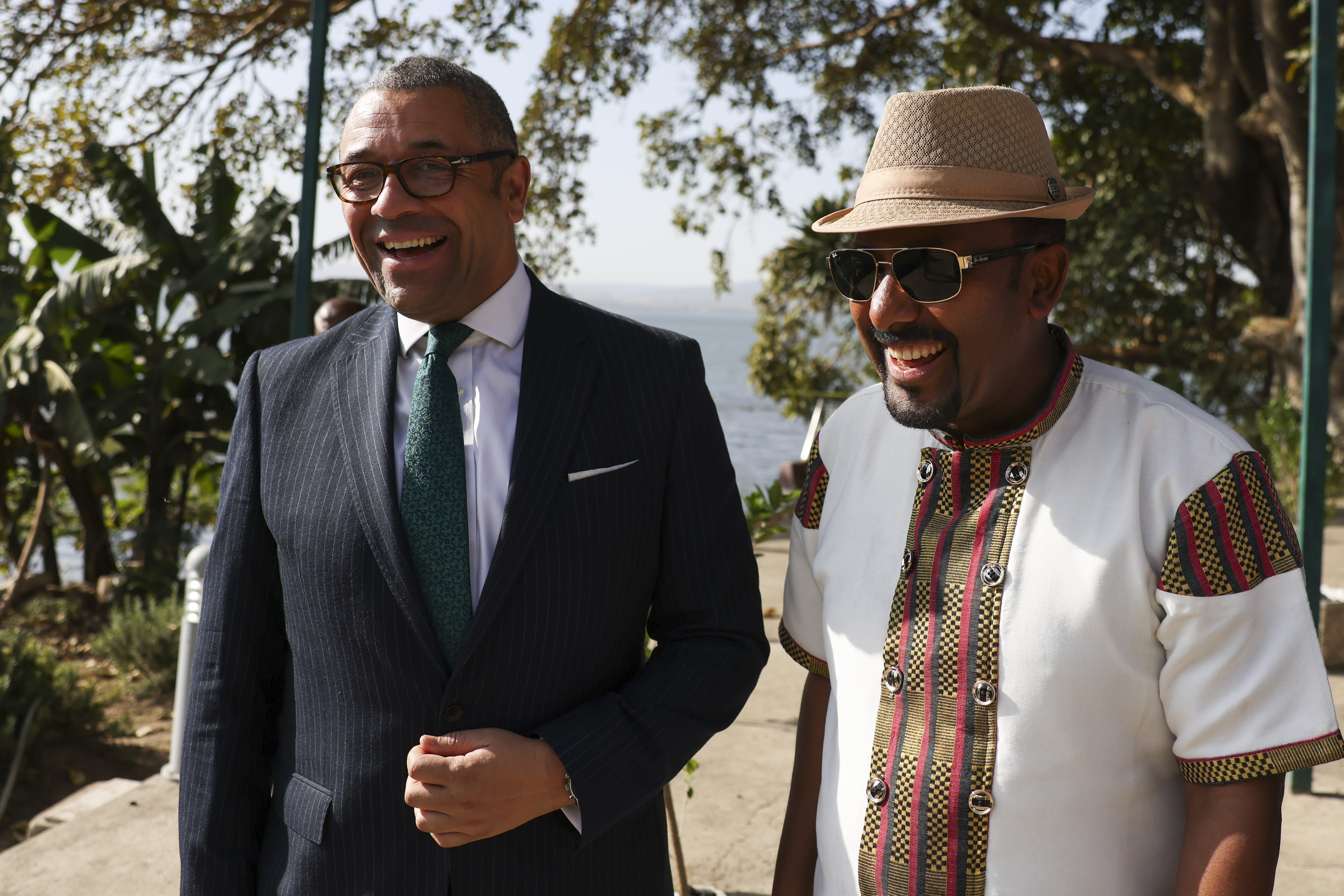
Abiy with British Foreign Secretary James Cleverly on 8 December 2022

In Asmara, on 8 July 2018, Abiy became the first Ethiopian leader to meet with an Eritrean counterpart in over two decades, in the 2018 Eritrea–Ethiopia summit. The very next day, the two signed a "Joint Declaration of Peace and Friendship" declaring an end to tensions and agreeing, amongst other matters, to re-establish diplomatic relations; reopen direct telecommunication, road, and aviation links; and facilitate Ethiopian use of the ports of Massawa and Asseb. Abiy was awarded the Nobel Peace Prize in 2019 for his efforts in ending the war.

In practice, the agreement has been described as "largely unimplemented". Critics say not much has changed between the two nations. Among the Eritrean diaspora, many voiced disapproval for the Nobel Peace Prize focusing on the agreement with Eritrea when so little had changed in practice. In July 2020, Eritrea's Ministry of Information said: "Two years after the signing of the Peace Agreement, Ethiopian troops continue to be present in our sovereign territories, Trade and economic ties of both countries have not resumed to the desired extent or scale."

In October 2023, Abiy said that the secession of Eritrea from Ethiopia in 1993 was a historical mistake that threatens the existence of landlocked Ethiopia, saying that "In 2030 we are projected to have a population of 150 million. 150 million people can't live in a geographic prison." He said Ethiopia has "natural rights" to direct access to the Red Sea and if denied, "there will be no fairness and justice and if there is no fairness and justice, it's a matter of time, we will fight".

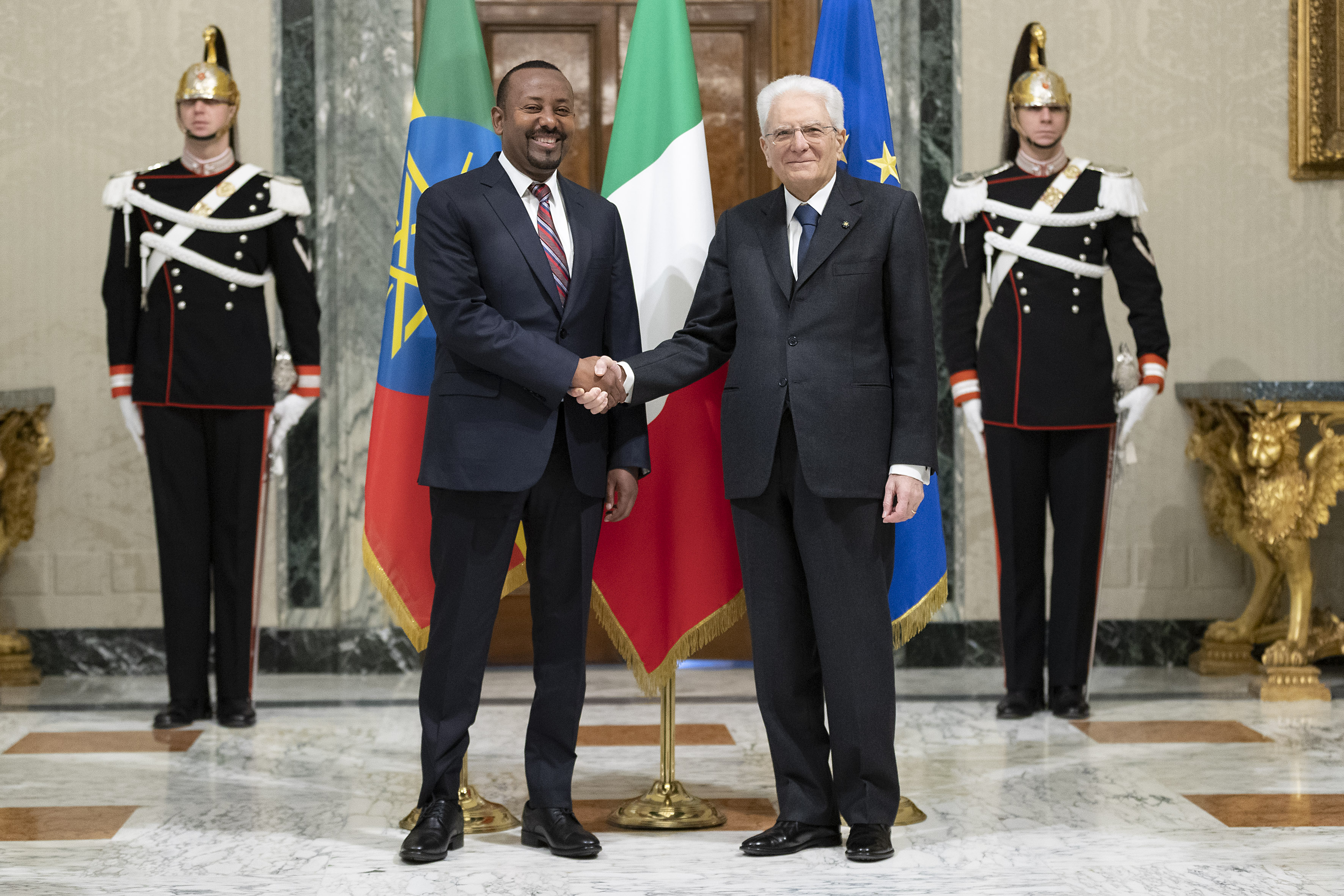
Abiy with Italian President Sergio Mattarella on 6 February 2023

==== Calls to revoke Nobel Peace Prize ====
In June 2021, representatives from multiple countries called for the award of the Nobel Peace Prize to Abiy to be re-considered because of the war crimes committed in Tigray. In an opinion piece, Simon Tisdall, one-time foreign editor of The Guardian, wrote that Abiy "should hand back his Nobel Peace Prize over his actions in the breakaway region".

A person on a petition organization called Change.org launched a campaign to gather 35,000 signatures for revoking his Peace Prize; as of September 2021, nearly 30,000 have been obtained.

==== Egypt ====
The dispute between Egypt and Ethiopia over the Grand Ethiopian Renaissance Dam has become a national preoccupation in both countries. Abiy has warned: "No force can stop Ethiopia from building a dam. If there is need to go to war, we could get millions readied."

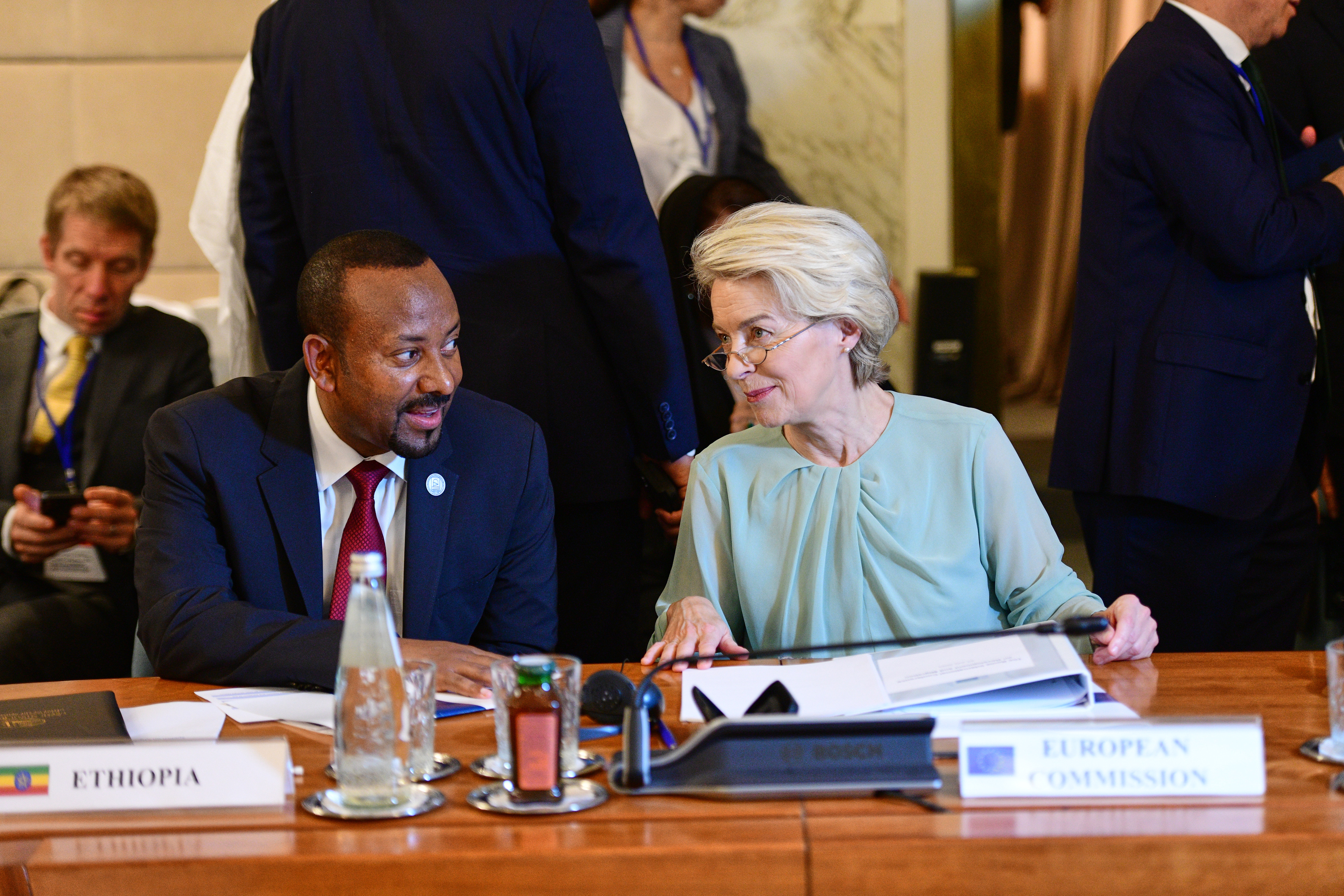
Abiy with European Commission President Ursula von der Leyen, 23 July 2023

After the murder of activist, singer and political icon Hachalu Hundessa ignited violence across Addis Ababa and other Ethiopian cities, Abiy hinted, without obvious suspects or clear motives for the killing, that Hundessa may have been murdered by Egyptian security agents acting on orders from Cairo to stir up trouble. An Egyptian diplomat responded by saying that Egypt "has nothing to do with current tensions in Ethiopia". Ian Bremmer wrote in a Time magazine article that Prime Minister Abiy "may just be looking for a scapegoat that can unite Ethiopians against a perceived common enemy".

=== Religious harmony ===
Ethiopia is a country of various religious groups, primarily Christian and Muslim communities. Both inter-religious and intra-religious divisions and conflicts were a major concern, where both the Ethiopian Orthodox Tewahedo Church and the Ethiopian Islamic Council experienced religious and administrative divisions and conflicts. In 2018, he was given a special "peace and reconciliation" award by the Ethiopian Church for his work in reconciling rival factions within the church.

=== Security sector reform ===
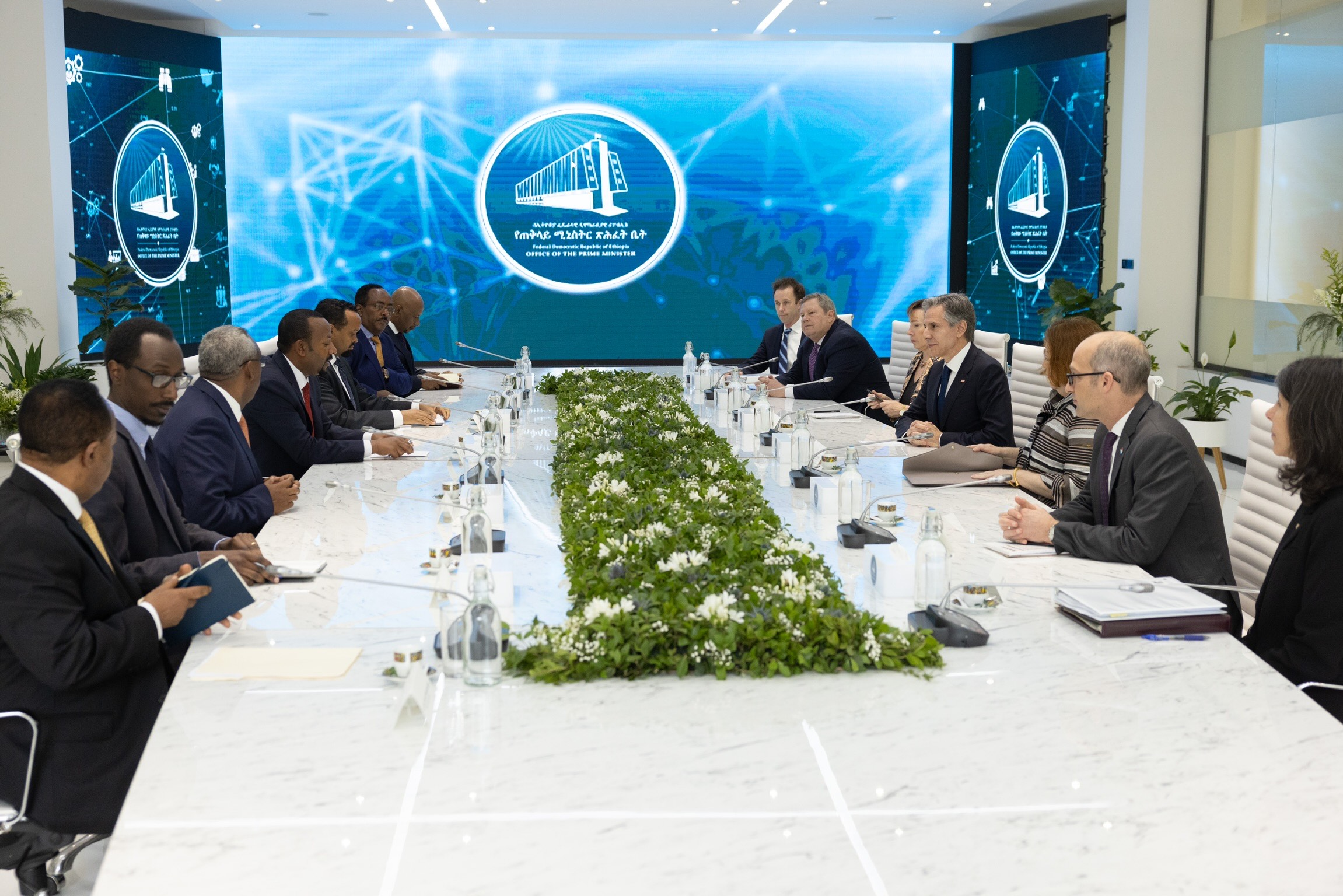
Abiy with US Secretary of State Antony Blinken in Addis Ababa on 15 March 2023

In June 2018, Abiy, speaking to senior commanders of the Ethiopian National Defense Force (ENDF) declared his intention to carry out reforms of the military to strengthen its effectiveness and professionalism, with the view of limiting its role in politics. This followed renewed calls both within Ethiopia and from international human rights groups, namely Amnesty International, to dissolve highly controversial regional militias such as the Liyyu force. This move is considered likely to face resistance from TPLF hardliners, who occupy much of the military high command.

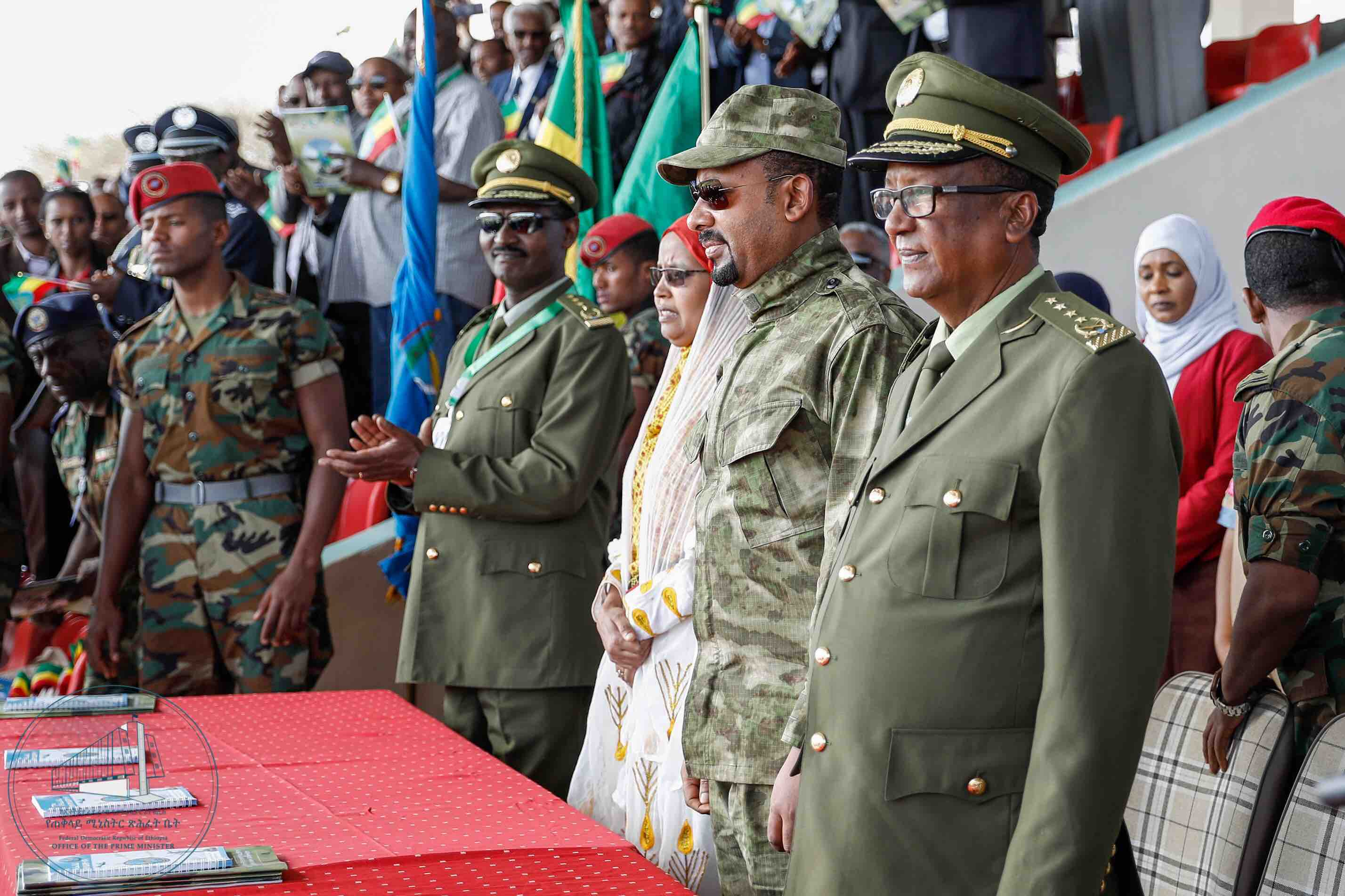
Abiy with military commanders in February 2019

Notably, he has also called for the eventual reconstitution of the Ethiopian Navy, dissolved in 1996 in the aftermath of Eritrea's secession after an extraterritorial sojourn in Djibouti, saying that "we should build our naval force capacity in the future." It was reported that this move would appeal to nationalists still smarting from the country's loss of its coastline 25 years prior. Ethiopia already has a maritime training institute on Lake Tana as well as a national shipping line.

On 7 June 2018, Abiy carried out a wide-ranging reshuffle of top security officials, replacing ENDF Chief of Staff Samora Yunis with Lieutenant General Se'are Mekonnen, National Intelligence and Security Service (NISS) director Getachew Assefa with Lieutenant General Adem Mohammed, National Security Advisor and former army chief Abadula Gemeda, and Sebhat Nega, one of the founders of the TPLF and director-general of the Foreign Relations Strategic Research Institute Sebhat's retirements had been previously announced that May.

=== Grenade attack ===
A large peaceful demonstration was organized in Addis Ababa at Meskel Square on 23 June 2018 to show support for the new prime minister. Just after Abiy had finished addressing the crowd a grenade was thrown and landed just 17 metres away from where he and other top officials were sitting. Two people were killed and over 165 were injured. Following the attack, 9 police officials were detained, including the deputy police commissioner, Girma Kassa, who was fired immediately. Questions were asked as to how a police car carrying attackers got so close to the prime minister and soon after the car was set alight destroying evidence. After the attack the prime minister addressed the nation on national TV unhurt by the blast and describing it as an "unsuccessful attempt by forces who do not want to see Ethiopia united". On the same day the prime minister made an unannounced visit to the Black Lion general hospital to meet victims of the attack.

=== Cabinet reshuffle ===
In the parliamentary session held on 16 October 2018, Abiy proposed to reduce the number of ministries from 28 to 20 with half of the cabinet positions for female ministers, a first in the history of the country. The new cabinet restructure included the first female president, Sahle-Work Zewde; the first female minister of the Ministry of Defense, Aisha Mohammed Musa; the first female minister of the new Ministry of Peace, Muferiat Kamil responsible for the Ethiopian Federal Police and the intelligence agencies; the first female press secretary for the Office of the Prime Minister, Billene Seyoum Woldeyes.

=== Internet shutdowns ===
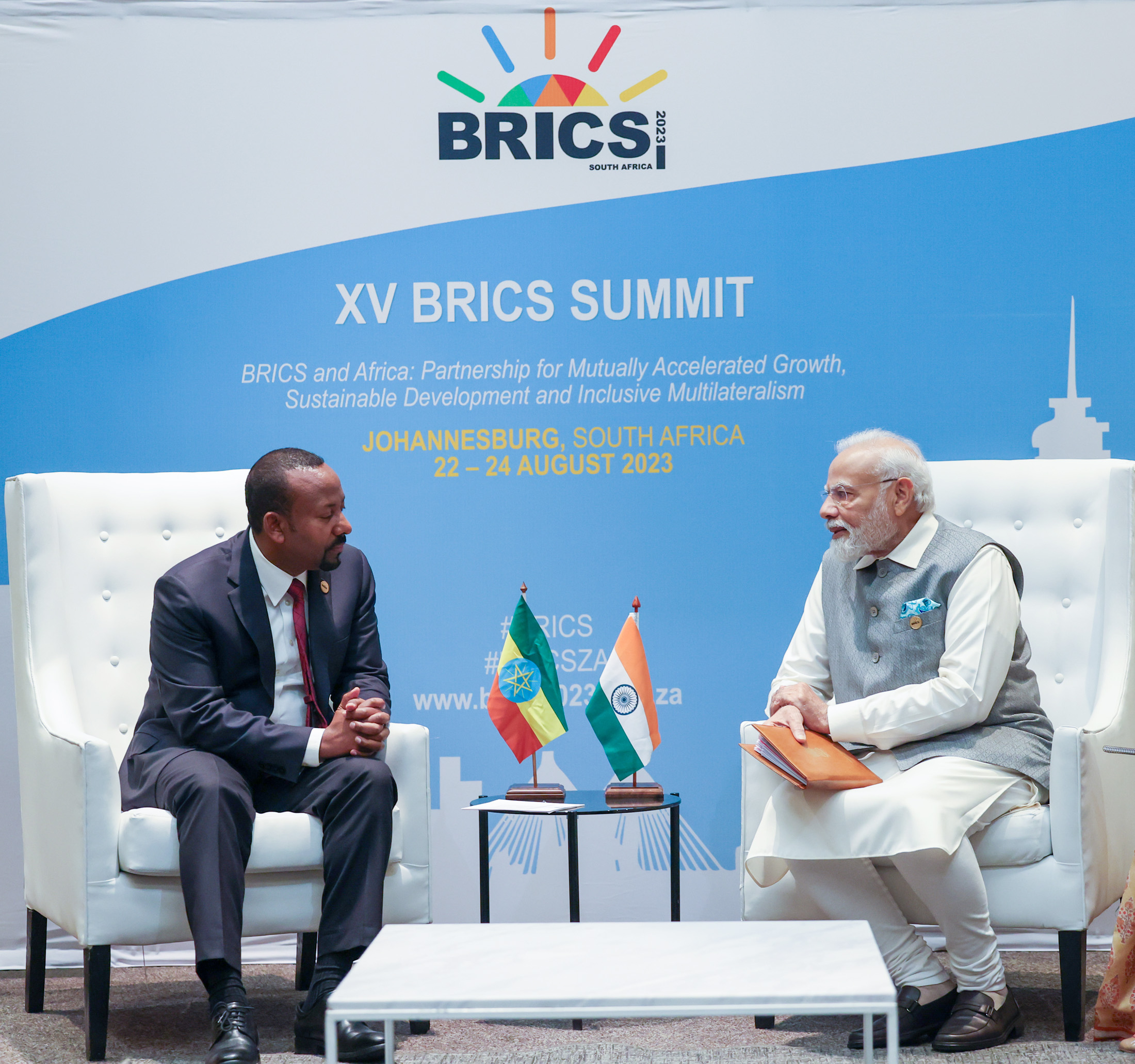
Abiy with Indian Prime Minister Narendra Modi during the 15th BRICS summit in Johannesburg, South Africa, 24 August 2023

According to NGOs like Human Rights Watch and NetBlocks, politically motivated Internet shutdowns have intensified in severity and duration under the leadership of Abiy Ahmed despite the country's rapid digitalization and reliance on cellular internet connectivity in recent years. In 2020, Internet shutdowns by the Ethiopian government had been described as "frequently deployed". Access Now said that shutdowns have become a "go-to tool for authorities to muzzle unrest and activism." His government will cut internet as and when, "it's neither water nor air" have said Abiy.

=== Political party reform ===
On 21 November 2019, upon approval of EPRDF ruling coalition, a new party, Prosperity Party, is formed via merging of three of the four parties that made up the Ethiopian People's Revolutionary Democratic Front (EPRDF) and other five affiliate parties. The parties include the Oromo Democratic Party (ODP), the Southern Ethiopian People's Democratic Movement (SEPDM), the Amhara Democratic Party (ADP), the Harari National League (HNL), the Ethiopian Somali Peoples Democratic Party (ESPDP), the Afar National Democratic Party (ANDP), the Gambella Peoples Unity Party (GPUP), and the Benishangul Gumuz Peoples Democratic Party (BGPDP). The programs and bylaws of the newly merged party were first approved by the executive committee of EPRDF. Abiy believes that "Prosperity Party is committed to strengthening and applying a true federal system which recognizes the diversity and contributions of all Ethiopians".

=== 2021 elections ===
In June 2020, Abiy and the National Election Board of Ethiopia (NEBE) postponed parliamentary elections because of the COVID-19 pandemic. The postponement was criticised, especially by the opposition, and questions were raised about the delay's constitutional legitimacy. An election was eventually held in 2021. The African Union described the election as an improvement compared to the 2015 election and positive overall, urging the government to continue the commitment to democracy.

== Political positions ==
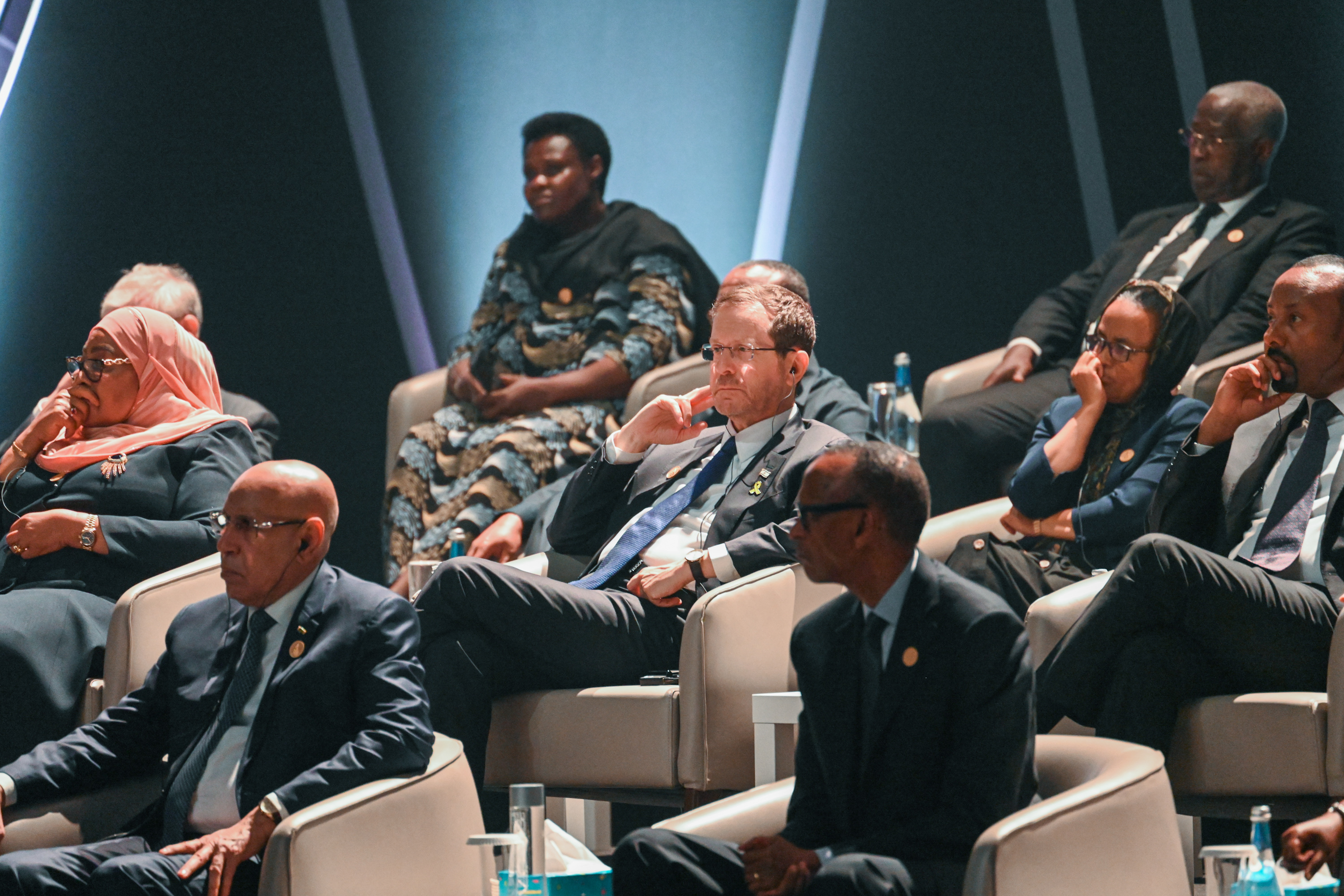
Abiy with Rwandan President Paul Kagame and Israeli President Isaac Herzog at the Kigali Genocide Memorial in Rwanda, 7 April 2024

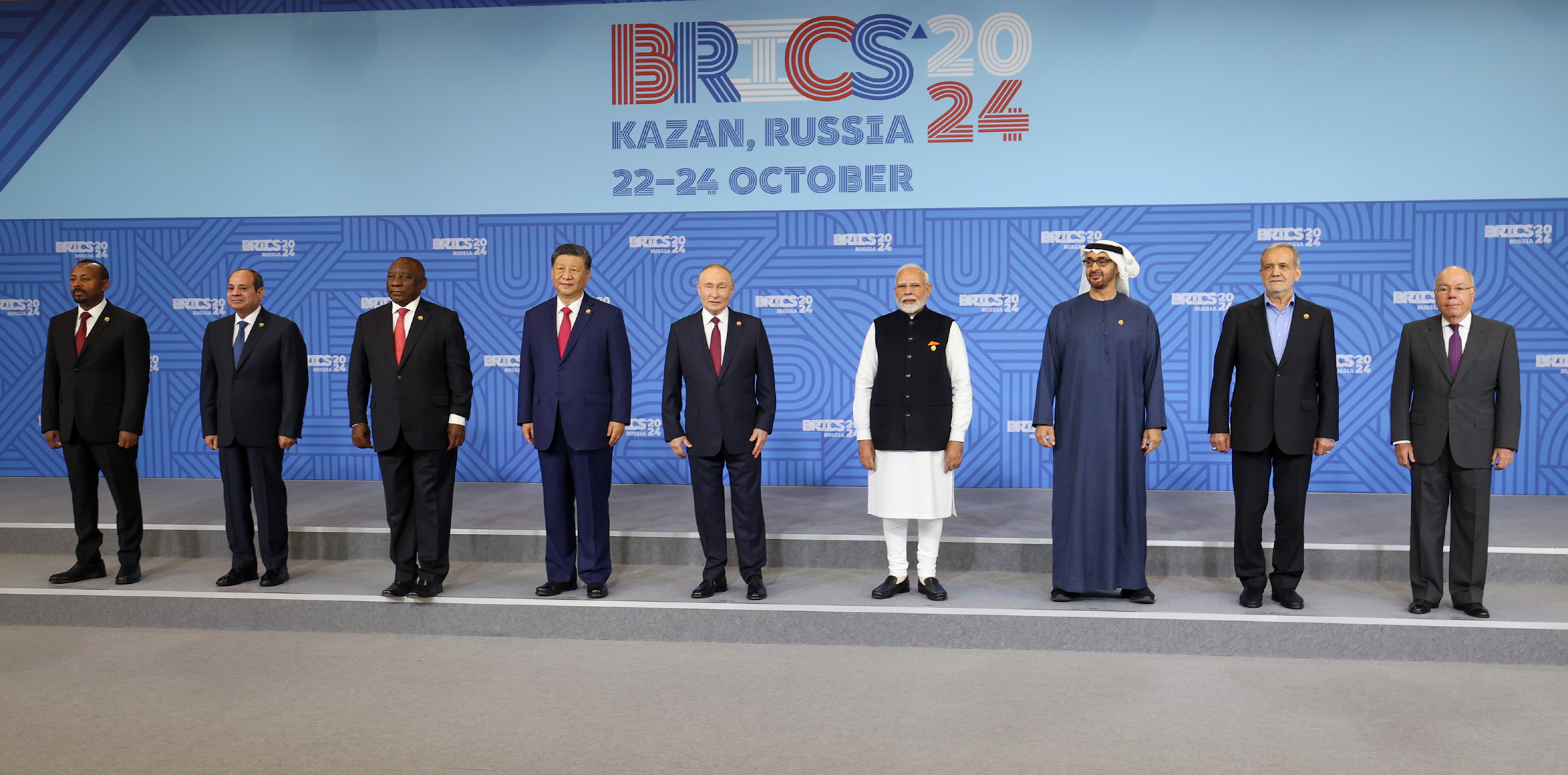
Abiy at the 16th BRICS summit in Kazan, Russia, 23 October 2024

Abiy has been described as a "liberal populist" by the academic and journalist Abiye Teklemariam and the influential Oromo activist Jawar Mohammed. Alemayehu Weldemariam, a U.S.-based Ethiopian lawyer and public intellectual, has called Abiy "an opportunistic populist jockeying for power on a democratizing platform." On the other hand, Tom Gardner argues in Foreign Policy that he's not a populist, but more of a liberal democrat. However, Gardner acknowledges that Abiy has "occasionally used language that can be read as euphemistic and conspiracy-minded", and might have "exploited the system's vulnerabilities, such as a pliable media and politicized judiciary, for his own ends."

Abiy's government was accused of authoritarianism and restricting freedom of the press, especially since the start of the Tigray War. Numerous watchdogs and human rights groups accused Abiy's government of "increasingly intimidating" the media as well as harassing opponents to propel unrest. In 2019 World Press Freedom Index, Ethiopia improved the rank by jumping forty positions from 150 to 110 out of 180 countries. In 2021, 46 journalists were detained, making Ethiopia the worst jailer in Africa. Journalist Gobeze Sisay was arrested by unknown plainclothes officers in his home on 1 May. On 3 May, the Ethiopian Human Rights Commission (EHRC) released statement about Gobez Sisay's whereabout. Similarly, the founder of Terara Network was arrested in Addis Ababa on 10 December 2021 in allegation of "disseminating misinformation", which was transferred to Sabata Daliti police station in Oromia Special Zone. He was released on 5 April 2022 with bail of 50,000 Ethiopian birr.

== Personal life ==
Abiy married Zinash Tayachew, an Amhara woman and gospel singer from Gondar, while both were serving in the Ethiopian National Defense Force. They are the parents of three daughters and one adopted son. Abiy speaks Oromo, Amharic, Tigrinya and English. He is a fitness aficionado and frequents physical and gym activities in Addis Ababa.

=== Religion ===
Although he was raised in a family of religious plurality, Abiy is a Pentecostal Christian. He and his family are regular church attendees, and he also occasionally ministers in preaching and teaching the gospel at the Ethiopian Full Gospel Believers' Church.

=== Education ===
While serving in the Ethiopian National Defense Force, Abiy received his first degree, a bachelor's degree in computer engineering from the Microlink Information Technology College in Addis Ababa in 2009.

Abiy holds a Master of Arts in transformational leadership earned from the business school at the University of Greenwich in London, in collaboration with the International Leadership Institute, Addis Ababa, in 2011. He also holds a Master of Business Administration from the Leadstar College of Management and Leadership in Addis Ababa in partnership with Ashland University in 2013.

Abiy, who had started his Doctor of Philosophy (PhD) work as a regular student, submitted his PhD thesis in 2016, and defended it in 2017 at the Institute for Peace and Security Studies, Addis Ababa University. He did his PhD work on the Agaro constituency with the PhD thesis entitled "Social Capital and its Role in Traditional Conflict Resolution in Ethiopia: The Case of Inter-Religious Conflict In Jimma Zone State", supervised by Amr Abdallah). In 2022, Alex de Waal described Abiy's PhD thesis as constituting an anecdote on an event in which an individual friendship between people of opposite sides augmented social capital and inspired the resolution of a local violent conflict in Jimma Zone. De Waal saw the thesis as "perhaps enough for an undergraduate paper", but not deep enough to cover social capital, background literature on armed conflict and resolution, or literature on "identity, nationalism and conflict". In 2023, de Waal and colleagues recommended that Addis Ababa University re-examine Abiy's PhD thesis for plagiarism, based on their claim of the presence of plagiarism on every page of Chapter 2 of the thesis.

Abiy published a related short research article on de-escalation strategies in the Horn of Africa in a special journal issue dedicated to countering violent extremism.

== Awards ==
#	Award	Awarding institution	Date
1	Most Excellent Order of the Pearl of Africa: Grand Master	Uganda	9 June 2018
2	Order of the Zayed Medal	UAE Crown Prince	24 July 2018
3	High Rank Peace Award	Ethiopian Orthodox Church	9 September 2018
4	Order of King Abdulaziz	Kingdom of Saudi Arabia	16 September 2018
5	Nominee for Tipperary International Peace Award alongside Mary Robinson (the eventual winner); Aya Chebbi; humanitarian worker in South Sudan Orla Treacy; the President of Eritrea, Isaias Afwerki; Swedish student and climate change activist Greta Thunberg Cherinet Hariffo Education Advocate From Ethiopia and Nigerian humanitarian activist Zannah Mustapha	Tipperary Peace Convention	November 2018
6	100 Most Influential Africans of 2018	New African magazine	1 December 2018
7	African of the year	The African leadership magazine	15 December 2018
8	The 5th Africa Humanitarian and Peacemakers Award (AHPA)	African Artists for Peace Initiative	2018
9	100 Most Influential People 2018	Time magazine	1 January 2019
10	100 Global Thinkers of 2019	Foreign Policy magazine	1 January 2019
11	Personality of the Year	AfricaNews.com	1 January 2019
12	African Excellence Award for Gender	African Union	11 February 2019
13	Humanitarian and Peace Maker Award	African Artists Peace Initiative	9 March 2019
14	Laureate of the 2019 edition of the Félix Houphouët-Boigny – UNESCO Peace Prize	UNESCO	2 May 2019
15	Peace Award for Contribution of Unity to Ethiopian Muslims	Ethiopian Muslim Community	25 May 2019
16	Chatham House Prize 2019 Nominee	Chatham House	July 2019
17	World Tourism Award 2019	World Tourism Forum	August 2019
18	Hessian Peace Prize	State of Hessen	August 2019
19	African Association of Political Consultants Award	APCAfrica	September 2019
20	Nobel Peace Prize	Nobel Foundation	11 October 2019
21	GIFA Laureate 2022 – Global Islamic Finance Award	Global Islamic Finance Awards	14 September 2022
22	Outstanding African Leadership Award Award for Green Legacy Initiative	American Academy of Achievement and Global Hope Coalition	13 December 2022
23	FAO Agricola Medal	UN's Food and Agriculture Organization	28 January 2024

== See also ==
- List of current heads of state and government
- List of heads of the executive by approval rating

== Notes ==
Government offices
Preceded by Teklebirhan Woldearegay	Director General of the Information Network Security Agency; 2008–2015	Succeeded by Temesgen Tiruneh
Political offices
Preceded by Demitu Hambisa	Minister of Science and Technology; 2015–2016	Succeeded by Getahun Mekuria
Preceded by Hailemariam Desalegn	Prime Minister of Ethiopia; 2018–present	Incumbent
Party political offices
Preceded by Lemma Megersa	Leader of the Oromo Democratic Party; 2018–2019	Position abolished
Preceded by Hailemariam Desalegn	Chairman of the Ethiopian People's Revolutionary Democratic Front; 2018–2019	Position abolished
New political party	President of the Prosperity Party; 2019–present	Incumbent
