= Eilema bicolor =

Eilema bicolor may refer to:

- Setema bicolor, also known as the bicolored moth or yellow-edged footman, a moth of the family Erebidae, found in North America
- Paraona bicolor, a moth of the family Erebidae, found on Madagascar
