= Setema (moth) =

Scientific classification
- Kingdom: Animalia
- Phylum: Arthropoda
- Clade: Pancrustacea
- Class: Insecta
- Order: Lepidoptera
- Superfamily: Noctuoidea
- Family: Erebidae
- Subfamily: Arctiinae
- Subtribe: Lithosiina
- Genus: Setema de Freina & Witt, 1980

Type species
- Bombyx cereola Hübner, [1803]

Synonyms
- Manulea (Setema) de Freina & Witt, 1980

Genus of moths

Setema is a genus of moths in the family Erebidae. It was formerly considered as a subgenus of Manulea, and was elevated to genus rank in 2020.

== Species ==
The following species are recognised in the genus Setema:

- Setema atratula (Eversmann, 1847)
- Setema bicolor (Grote, 1864)
- Setema cereola (Hübner, [1803])
- Setema debilis (Staudinger, 1887)
- Setema hyalinofuscatum (Tshistjakov, 1990)
- Setema nigrocollare (Tshistjakov, 1990)
- Setema vakulenkoi (Tshistjakov, 1990)
