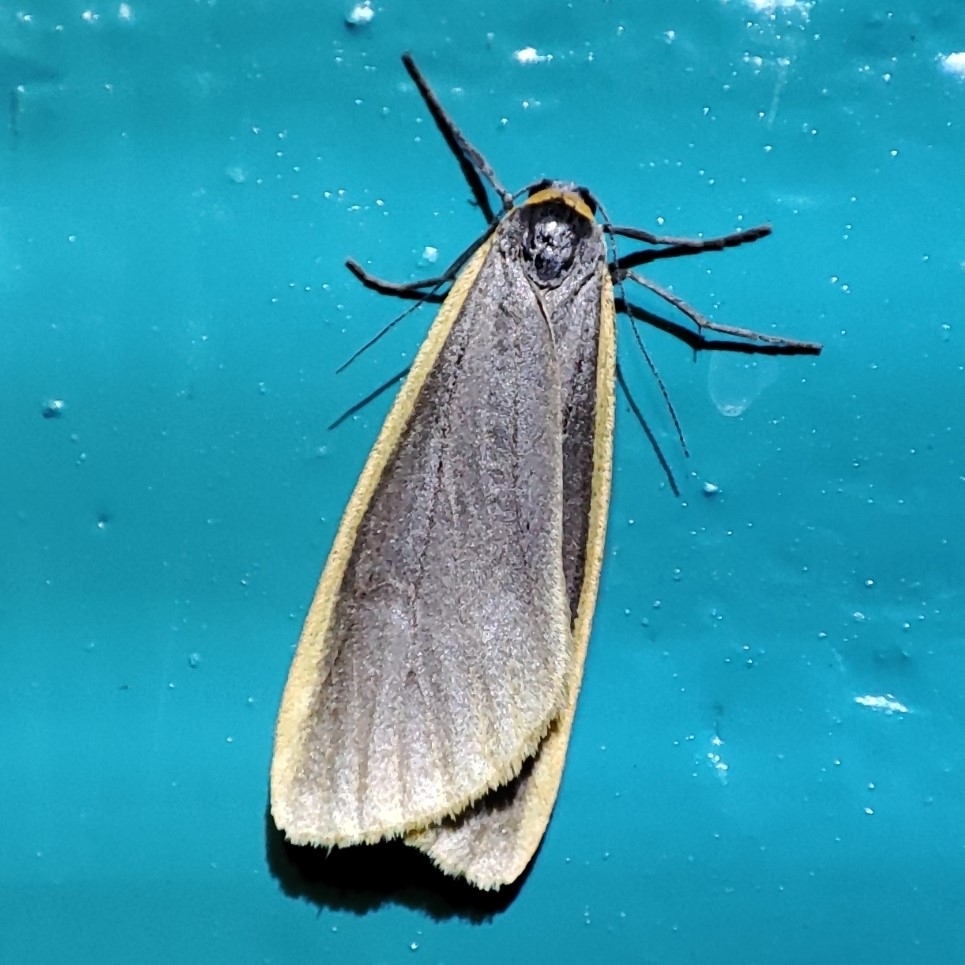

Scientific classification
- Missing taxonomy template (fix): Setema
- Species: Template:Taxonomy/SetemaS. debilis

Binomial name
- Template:Taxonomy/SetemaSetema debilis (Staudinger, 1887)

Synonyms
- Lithosia debilis Staudinger, 1887; Eilema debilis; Eilema debile; Manulea debilis (Staudinger, 1887)

= Setema debilis =

Species of moth

Setema debilis is a species of moth in the family Erebidae. It is found in Russia (Altai, Sajan, Transbaicalia, Jakutia) and Mongolia.
