= Setema vakulenkoi =

Scientific classification
- Kingdom: Animalia
- Phylum: Arthropoda
- Class: Insecta
- Order: Lepidoptera
- Superfamily: Noctuoidea
- Family: Erebidae
- Subfamily: Arctiinae
- Genus: Setema
- Species: S. vakulenkoi

Binomial name
- Setema vakulenkoi (Tshistjakov, 1990)

Synonyms
- Eilema vakulenkoi Tshistjakov, 1990; Manulea vakulenkoi (Tshistjakov, 1990)

Species of moth

Setema vakulenkoi is a species of moth in the family Erebidae. It is found in Russia (Taimyr, north-eastern Jakutia, Transbaicalia).
