= Setema nigrocollare =

Scientific classification
- Kingdom: Animalia
- Phylum: Arthropoda
- Class: Insecta
- Order: Lepidoptera
- Superfamily: Noctuoidea
- Family: Erebidae
- Subfamily: Arctiinae
- Genus: Setema
- Species: S. nigrocollare

Binomial name
- Setema nigrocollare (Tshistjakov, 1990)

Synonyms
- Eilema nigrocollare Tshistjakov, 1990; Manulea nigrocollare (Tshistjakov, 1990)

Species of moth

Setema nigrocollare is a species of moth in the family Erebidae. It is found in Russia (Magadan Oblast, Maymandzhin Range, Upper Kolyma).
