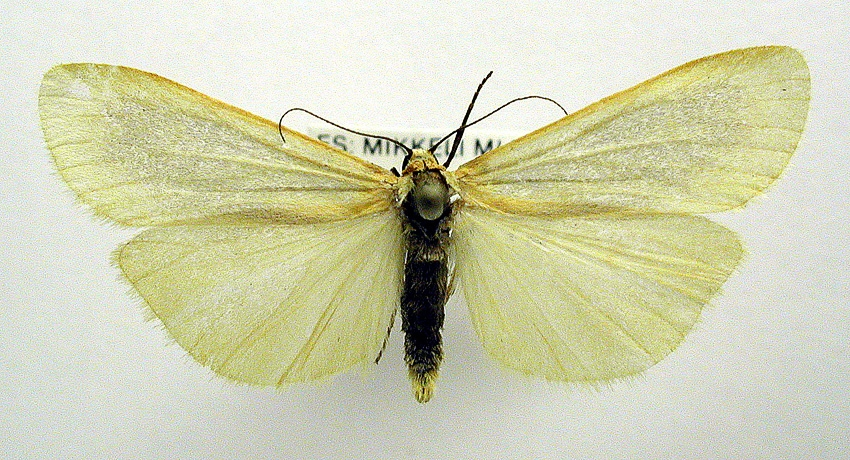

Scientific classification
- Kingdom: Animalia
- Phylum: Arthropoda
- Class: Insecta
- Order: Lepidoptera
- Superfamily: Noctuoidea
- Family: Erebidae
- Subfamily: Arctiinae
- Genus: Setema
- Species: S. cereola

Binomial name
- Setema cereola (Hübner, [1803])

Synonyms
- Bombyx cereola Hübner, [1803]; Lithosia cinereola Zeller, 1847; Ilema cereola; Eilema cereola; Eilema cereolum; Manulea cereola {Hübner, [1803])

= Setema cereola =

Species of moth

Setema cereola is a species of moth in the family Erebidae. It is found in Fennoscandia, the Baltic States, European Russia as well as the Alps and Urals. The species was first described by Jacob Hübner in 1803.

The wingspan is 18–32 mm.

The larvae feed on various lichen species from the genus Parmelia.
