= Paraona bicolor =

Scientific classification
- Kingdom: Animalia
- Phylum: Arthropoda
- Class: Insecta
- Order: Lepidoptera
- Superfamily: Noctuoidea
- Family: Erebidae
- Subfamily: Arctiinae
- Genus: Paraona
- Species: P. bicolor

Binomial name
- Paraona bicolor Toulgoët, 1968

Synonyms
- Eilema bicolor (Volynkin, 2024) homonym of Setema bicolor

Species of moth

Paraona bicolor is a moth of the family Erebidae. It was described by Hervé de Toulgoët in 1968. It is found on Madagascar.
