= Sigmo (woreda) =

Woreda or district of Ethiopia

Coordinates: 7°50′N 36°05′E

Sigmo is one of the woredas in the Oromia Region of Ethiopia. This woreda shares the same name as its administrative center, Sigmo. Located in the western part of the Jimma Zone, Sigmo is bordered on the south by Gera, on the west by the Southern Nations, Nationalities and Peoples Region, on the north by the Illubabor Zone, and on the east by Setema.

== Overview ==
The altitude of this woreda ranges from 2080 to 2490 meters above sea level. Perennial rivers include the Gebba, Bodeche and Atergeda. A survey of the land in this woreda shows that 19.8% is arable or cultivable (18.4% was under annual crops), 1.5% pasture, 74.2% forest, and the remaining 4.5% is considered swampy, degraded or otherwise unusable. The forested areas include 118.4 hectares of the Sigmo-Geba State Forest. The Oromia Regional government considers Sigmo a "surplus crop-producing district". Teff, corn, sheep and goats are important cash crops.

Industry in the woreda includes 25 grain mills and 2 sawmills. There were 16 Farmers Associations with 10,017 members and 4 Farmers Service Cooperatives with 8,714 members. Sigmo has 18 kilometers of all-weather roads, for an average road density of 15.1 kilometers per 1000 square kilometers. About 62% of the urban and 9.6% of the rural population has access to drinking water.

== Demographics ==
The 2007 national census reported a total population for this woreda of 92,313, of whom 45,837 were men and 46,476 were women; 5,511 or 5.97% of its population were urban dwellers. The majority of the inhabitants were Moslem, with 98.23% of the population reporting they observed this belief.

Based on figures published by the Central Statistical Agency in 2005, this woreda has an estimated total population of 99,998, of whom 50,355 are men and 49,643 are women; 3,494 or 3.49% of its population are urban dwellers, which is less than the Zone average of 12.3%. With an estimated area of 1,192.03 square kilometers, Sigmo has an estimated population density of 83.9 people per square kilometer, which is less than the Zone average of 150.6.

The 1994 national census reported a total population for this woreda of 72,190, of whom 36,020 were men and 36,170 women; 1,952 or 2.7% of its population were urban dwellers at the time. The two largest ethnic groups reported in Sigmo were the Oromo (96.79%), and the Kafficho (2.15%); all other ethnic groups made up 1.06% of the population. Oromiffa was spoken as a first language by 97.91%, and 2.3% spoke Kafa; the remaining 0.78% spoke all other primary languages reported. The majority of the inhabitants were Muslim, with 97.94% of the population having reported they practiced that belief, while 1.55% of the population said they professed Ethiopian Orthodox Christianity.
