= Guma (woreda) =

Woreda or district of Ethiopia

Guma is one of the woredas in the Oromia Region of Ethiopia. It was part of Gomma woreda. The administrative center of this woreda is Toba.

== Population ==
The 2007 national census reported a total population for this woreda of 60,490, of whom 30,284 were men and 30,206 were women; 5,269 or 8.71% of its population were urban dwellers. The majority of the inhabitants were Moslem, with 94.97% of the population reporting they observed this belief, while 4.37% of the population said they practised Ethiopian Orthodox Christianity.
