= Setema hyalinofuscatum =

Scientific classification
- Kingdom: Animalia
- Phylum: Arthropoda
- Class: Insecta
- Order: Lepidoptera
- Superfamily: Noctuoidea
- Family: Erebidae
- Subfamily: Arctiinae
- Genus: Setema
- Species: S. hyalinofuscatum

Binomial name
- Setema hyalinofuscatum (Tshistjakov, 1990)

Synonyms
- Eilema hyalinofuscatum Tshistjakov, 1990; Manulea hyalinofuscatum (Tshistjakov, 1990)

Species of moth

Setema hyalinofuscatum is a species of moth in the family Erebidae. It is found on Wrangel Island and in Chukotka.
