= Beshasha =

Town in Oromia Region, Ethiopia

Beshasha በሻሻ
- Town
- Location within Ethiopia
- Coordinates: 7°47′44″N 36°28′39″E
- Country: Ethiopia
- Region: Oromia
- Zone: Jimma

Population (2005)
  - Total: 2,624
- Time zone: UTC+3 (EAT)

Beshasha (meaning 'open handed/kind' in Afaan Oromoo) is a town in central Ethiopia. It is located in the Gomma woreda near Agaro, which is a part of the Jimma Zone in the Oromia Region. The town is well known for being the birthplace of Ethiopian prime minister and 2019 Nobel Peace Prize winner Abiy Ahmed.

Based on figures from the Central Statistical Agency in 2005, Beshasha has an estimated total population of 2,624 of whom 1,320 were males and 1,304 were females. The 1994 census reported this town had a total population of 1,467 of whom 716 were males and 751 were females. It is one of six towns in Gomma woreda.

Records at the Nordic Africa Institute website provide details of a primary school constructed with Swedish funds at Beshasha in 1965. On 14 October 2006, three hundred Muslims, armed with guns and knives, reportedly attacked a group of unarmed Ethiopian Christians. Reports claim that six people (two priests, two elderly women and two men) were killed and 15 others wounded. The Christians were holding a midnight worship service in a local church. In February of the following year, the Jimma Federal High Court sentenced six men to death and 100 other defendants to prison for their participation in this attack.
