= Setema atratula =

Scientific classification
- Kingdom: Animalia
- Phylum: Arthropoda
- Class: Insecta
- Order: Lepidoptera
- Superfamily: Noctuoidea
- Family: Erebidae
- Subfamily: Arctiinae
- Genus: Setema
- Species: S. atratula

Binomial name
- Setema atratula (Eversmann, 1847)

Synonyms
- Lithosia atratula Eversmann, 1847; Eilema atratula; Eilema atratulum; Manulea atratula (Eversmann, 1847)

Species of moth

Setema atratula is a species of moth in the family Erebidae. It is found in Russia (mountains of southern Siberia, Jakutia, Kolyma), Mongolia and North Korea.
