= Gera (woreda) =

Woreda or district of Ethiopia

Coordinates: 7°40′N 36°15′E

Gera is one of the woredas in the Oromia Region of Ethiopia. It is named after the former Kingdom of Gera, whose territory was approximately the same as the modern woreda. Part of the Jimma Zone, Gera is bordered on the south by the Gojeb River which separates it from the Southern Nations, Nationalities and Peoples Region, on the northwest by Sigmo, on the north by Setema, on the northeast by Gomma, and on the east by Seka Chekorsa. The administrative center of this woreda is Chira; other towns in Gera include Cheriko and Dusta.

== Overview ==
The altitude of this woreda ranges from 1390 to 2980 meters above sea level; mountains include Waka, Kimbibit and Timba. Perennial rivers include the Naso. A survey of the land in this woreda shows that 26.5% is arable or cultivable (23.4% was under annual crops), 7.0% pasture, 56.6% forest, and the remaining 9.9% is considered degraded, built-up or otherwise unusable. Spices, corn and teff are important cash crops. Coffee is an important cash crop of this woreda. Over 50 square kilometers are planted with this crop.

Industry in the woreda includes 7 grain mills. Clay and iron deposits are known in the woreda, but have not yet been developed. There are 27 Farmers Associations with 10,545 members and 16 Farmers Service Cooperatives with the same number of members. Gera has 41 kilometers of dry-weather and 50 of all-weather road, for an average road density of 62.7 kilometers per 1,000 square kilometers. About 20.4% of the urban and 17.2% of the rural population has access to drinking water.

== Demographics ==
The 2007 national census reported a total population for this woreda of 112,395, of whom 56,488 were men and 55,907 were women; 4,746 or 4.22% of its population were urban dwellers. The majority of the inhabitants were Moslem, with 85.64% of the population reporting they observed this belief, while 11.9% of the population said they practised Ethiopian Orthodox Christianity, and 2.36% were Protestant.

Based on figures published by the Central Statistical Agency in 2005, this woreda has an estimated total population of 104,036, of whom 52,183 are men and 51,853 are women; 8,185 or 7.87% of its population are urban dwellers, which is less than the Zone average of 12.3%. With an estimated area of 1,451.25 square kilometers, Gera has an estimated population density of 71.7 people per square kilometer, which is less than the Zone average of 150.6.

The 1994 national census reported a total population for this woreda of 74,337, of whom 37,183 were men and 37,154 women; 4,573 or 6.15% of its population were urban dwellers at the time. The three largest ethnic groups reported in Gera were the Oromo (86.08%), the Amhara (8.27%), and the Kafficho (4.16%); all other ethnic groups made up 1.49% of the population. Oromiffa was spoken as a first language by 86.02%, 9.71% spoke Amharic, and 3.48% spoke Kafa; the remaining 1.52% spoke all other primary languages reported. The majority of the inhabitants were Muslim, with 87.22% of the population having reported they practiced that belief, while 11.15% of the population said they professed Ethiopian Orthodox Christianity, and 1.26% were Protestant.
