= Terara Network =

Ethiopian media company

- Company type: News media
- Founded: 26 September 2020
- Founder: Tamerat Negera
- Headquarters: Addis Ababa, Ethiopia
- Key people: Tamerat Negera (CEO) Clive Stephany (Project Manager)
- Website: teraranetwork.com

Terara Network is an Ethiopian media company based in Addis Ababa. The company's main journalist who is the owner of the company is Tamerat Negera. The company was established on 26 September 2020, by Tamerat Negera through the charity funds raised by his friend Tariku Geleta.

== Troubles ==
The company's most senior member Temerat Negera who serves both as editor in chief and CEO of the company has had trouble with law enforcement in the past where the government has arrested him for over 4 months without any charges laid against him. Two other Terare Network journalists were also arrested by Ethiopian police forces.

=== Release ===
The company's chief editor and founder Tamerat Negera was able to be released by bail by the order of the Supreme Court of Oromia after over 3 months of arrest without charge.
