= Ethiopian Full Gospel Believers' Church =

Church in Ethiopia

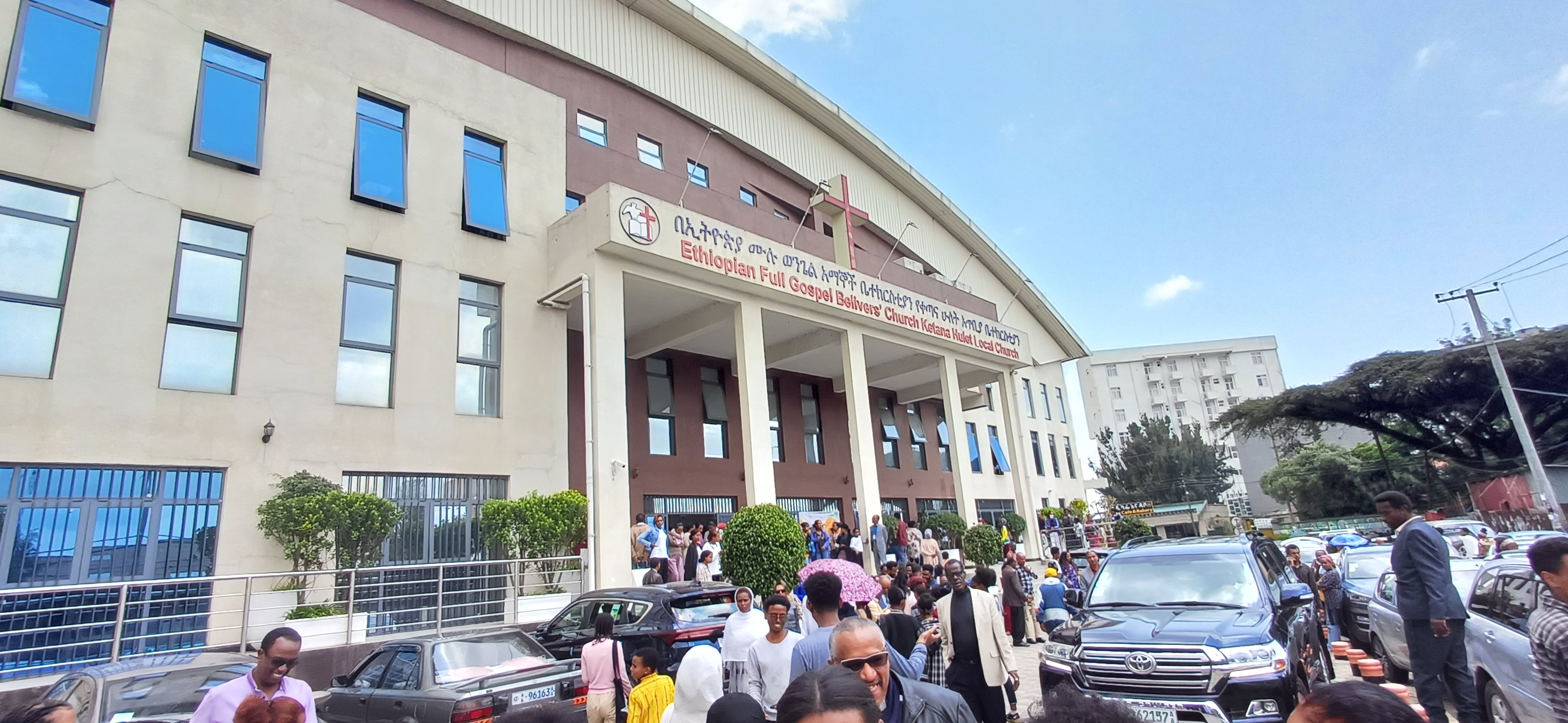
- Classification: Evangelical Christianity
- Orientation: Protestant
- Theology: Pentecostal
- Pastor Lako Bedasso (President): Pastor Leweyehu Sinshaw (Vice President)
- Headquarters: Addis Ababa, Ethiopia
- Congregations: 3892
- Members: 10 million
- Official website: https://etfullgospel.com/

The Ethiopian Full Gospel Believers' Church is a Pentecostal Christian denomination in Ethiopia. The headquarters is in Addis Ababa.

== History ==
The Ethiopian Full Gospel Believers' Church has its origins in a prayer conference held at the University of Addis Ababa in 1966. The church was officially founded in 1967. In 2015, it had 2,143 churches and 4.5 million members. The head and largest church is Ketana Hulet Local Church, Addis Ababa.

== Beliefs ==
The denomination has a Pentecostal confession of faith.

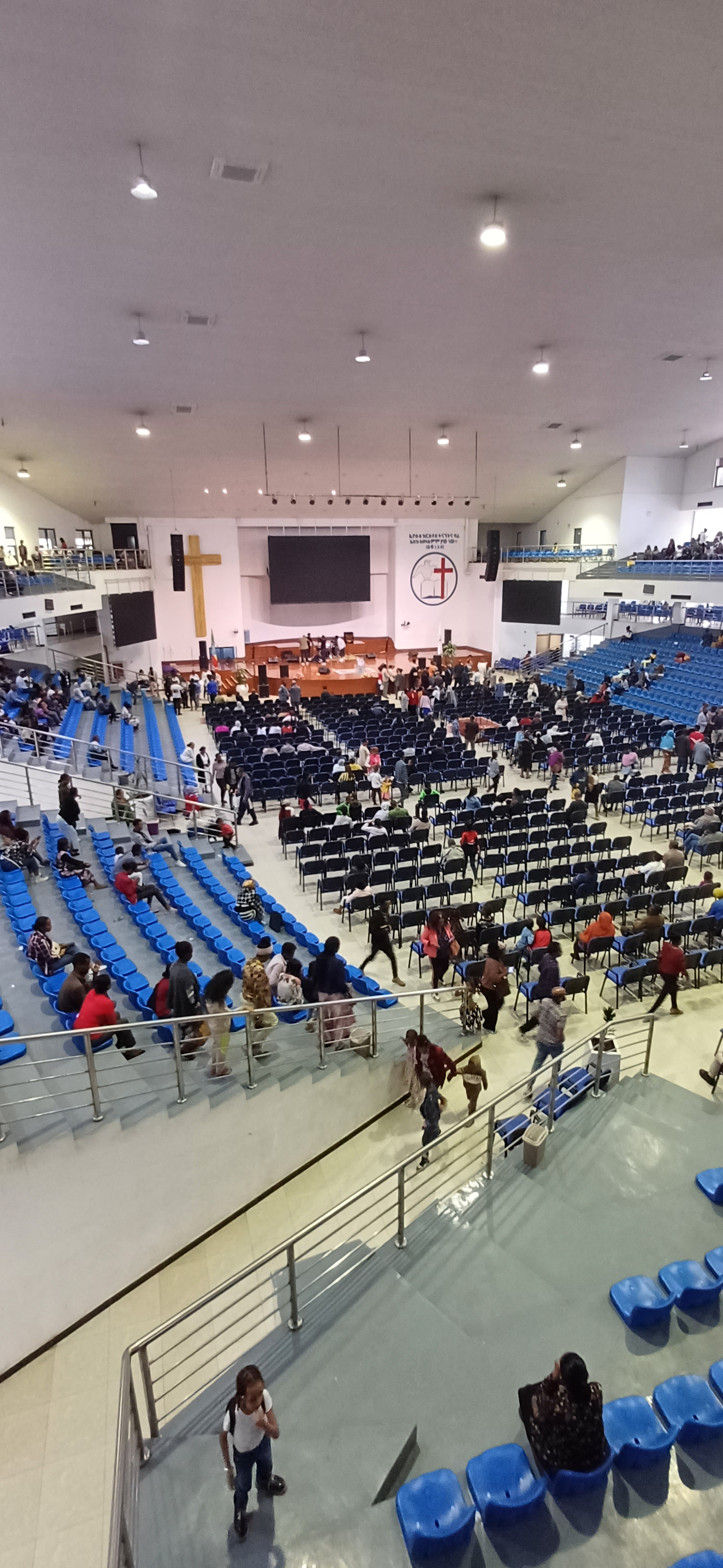
