= Orla Treacy =

Irish missionary in South Sudan

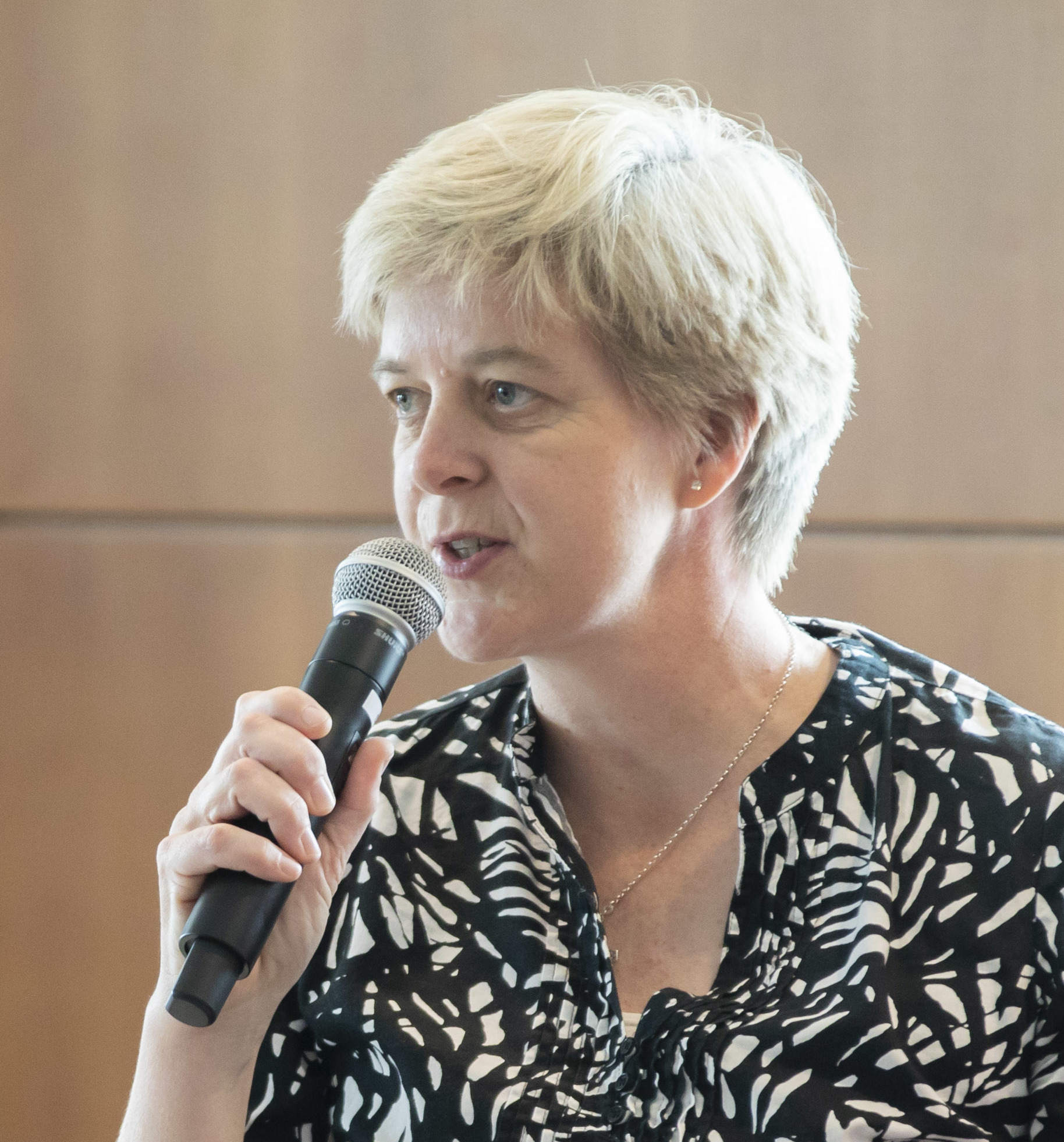
- Treacy speaking at the Elliott School of International Affairs, Washington, DC; 2019.
- Born: Bray, County Wicklow, Ireland
- Education: Presentation Convent Tralee; Loretto Convent Bray
- Alma mater: Mater Dei Institute of Education; Dublin City University
- Occupations: Religious Sister, Teacher

Orla Treacy is an Irish Loreto sister who runs a boarding school in war torn South Sudan and she works for Women's education and prevent child marriages. Born in 1973 in Bray, County Wicklow, she became an International Women of Courage Award recipient in 2019.

In 2017 she was awarded The Hugh O’Flaherty International Humanitarian Award by the Mayor of Killarney. In 2021, Sr. Treacy was awarded the Distinguished Service Award for the Irish Abroad, by Michael D. Higgins, who is the President of Ireland.

Orla was educated in Presentation Convent Tralee, County Kerry, then Loretto Convent in Bray completing her Leaving Cert in 1991. She went to Mater Dei Institute of Education, Dublin, and completing her degree in 1995 she became a school teacher. She taught in Presentation College Cork, Loreto Letterkenny, St Muredach's Ballina and Loreto Crumlin. Treacy completed an MA in Chaplaincy and Pastoral care with Mater Dei awarded by Dublin City University in 2002. At the age of 24 Orla decided to join the Loretto Sisters, and was based in Rathfarnham, Dublin, she was professed in 2005.

In 2005 Sr Orla along with two other Irish nuns were invited by Bishop Cesare Mazzolari the Italian-born Bishop of Rumbek, to set up a school in Rumbeck, South Sudan. Today Orla, is the Principal and the director of the centre that provides Primary and Secondary Schooling to boys and girls, teacher training, and also provides a health centre staffed by Kenyan nuns.
