= Tamerat Negera =

Ethiopian journalist

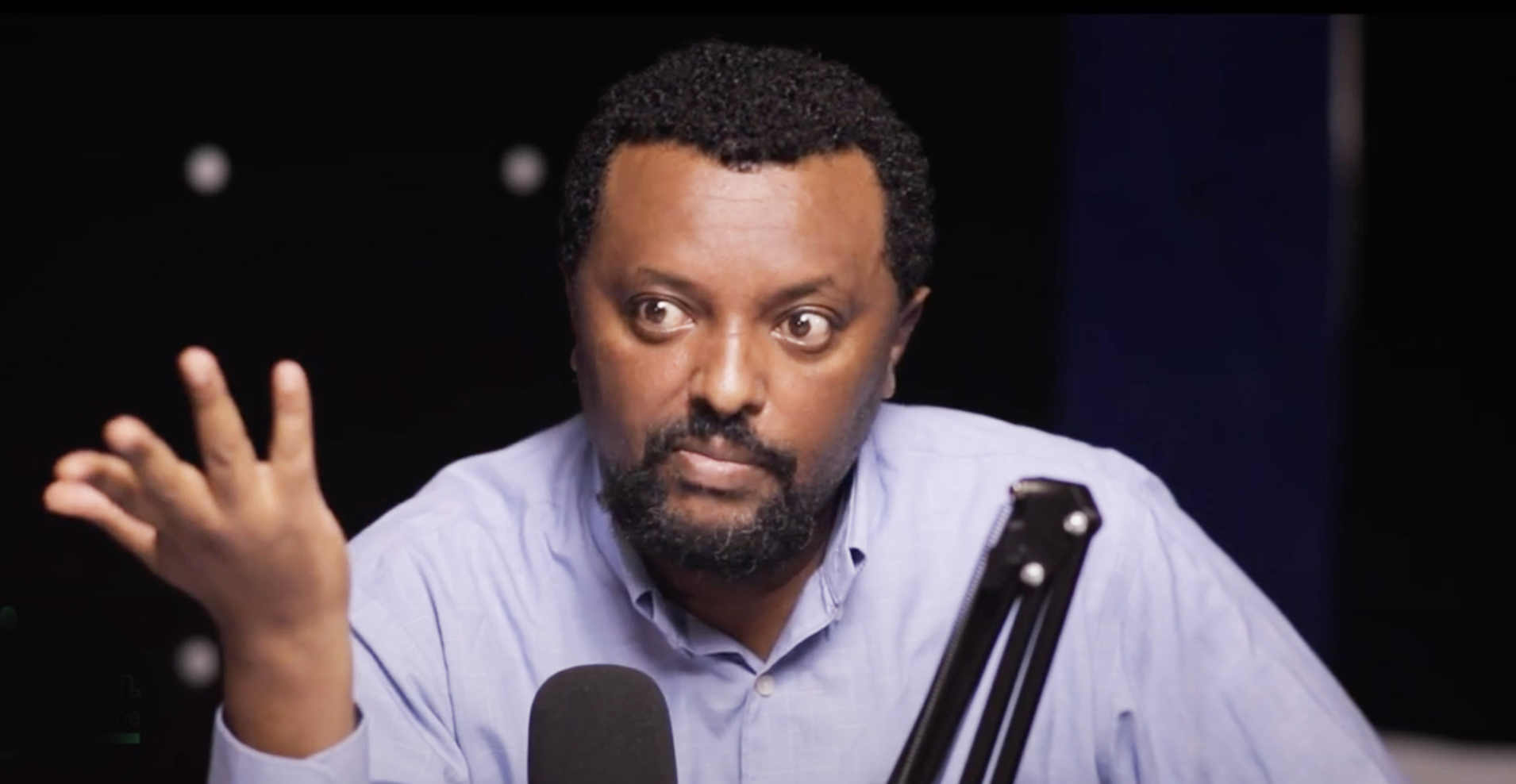
- Tamerat Negera
- Born: Addis Ababa, Ethiopia
- Occupations: Journalist, political commentator, media entrepreneur
- Known for: Co-founder of Terara Media Group; Editor-in-chief of Addis Neger newspaper Critic of ethnic federalism in Ethiopia
- Notable work: Terara Network, advocacy for political reform in Ethiopia
- Spouse: Selam Belay (m. 2019)

Tamerat Negera is an Ethiopian journalist, analyst, and a commentator on Ethiopian politics. He was born in Addis Ababa, Ethiopia to his mother Daditu Tucho Jote and his father Seargent (Hamsa Aleqa) Negera Feyisa Gurara. He is married to Weyzero Selam Belay since 2019.

== Work ==
He started his professional career in 2002 as a radio journalist on the Hiyaw Tesfa Pentecostal Radio (HITPAR), an affiliate of the International Bible Reading Association (IBRA). Later, he joined the former Addis Neger newspaper, where he worked as a journalist and editor-in-chief. Addis Neger was among Addis Abeba's popular newspapers in its heyday. Founded in 2007 by six journalists, including Tamerat Negera, the fame of the newspaper and its contributors rose rapidly due to its presentation of credible and meticulously researched content. However, Addis Neger stopped printing suddenly in December 2009. Tamerat and his colleagues in exile stated that they had learned the government was preparing to bring charges against them.

== May 2005 elections ==
During Ethiopia's heavily contested May 2005 national elections, Tamerat was elected as a people representative for the Addis Abeba City Council. The election was considered the first genuinely competitive multi-party election that the country had experienced in its political history. And Tamerat was a candidate of one of the coalition groups that formed the main opposition party, the Coalition for Unity and Democracy (CUD) (popularly known as Kinijit). The CUD was a coalition of several parties, and Tamerat was a member of the Ethiopia Democratic League (EDL). Despite the positive developments of the pre-election period, the post-election period was marred with widespread violence as the ruling party would not accept some of the polling results. The ruling party, the Ethiopian People Revolutionary Democratic Front (EPRDF), suppressed the CUD and imprisoned thousands of people. Military and police officers then killed about 200 opposition protesters, and many journalists and politicians were jailed for the next two years.

== Later career ==
Tamerat, exiled in the United States for nine years, never stopped from voicing his opinions about national integrity, equality, freedom of expression, and protection of human rights. Since 2018, and after returning home following PM Abiy Ahmed's lifting of the criminalization against exiled opposition figures and journalists, he continued spreading his messages, at times through successful social media campaigns.

Tamerat had been encouraging a democratic and nonviolent political transition in Ethiopia in his journalistic works. After his return from exile in the United States, Tamerat co-founded the Terara Media Group. He is known for his aversion to ethnic nationalisms, ethnic federalism, and ethnic politics at large and eventually became a staunch critic, if not the leading figure of opposition to the current ethnic federalist arrangement of the country and its constitution. Ethnic federalism redesigned the country along ethnic lines following EPRDF's ascent to power in 1991. Tamerat argued that ethnic federalism has been a potential cause of the many catastrophes Ethiopia finds itself muddled in, namely: ethnic cleansing, identity-based mass killings, millions of internally forced displacements, military and arms races between the regional states, and the like. He staunchly argued that if a solution wasn't found soon enough, Ethiopia would find itself in an unintended and unmanageable crisis that could potentially disintegrate it, like the former Yugoslavia. Ethiopia needs to rethink its ethnic federal arrangement, remains his major concern. And in addition to commenting on what he deems is Ethiopia's period of political disorder and lawlessness, Tamerat has, on several occasions, bitterly criticized the autocratic Eritrea and its despotic ruler.

Tamerat Negera was in jail from 10 December 2021 until 6 April 2022 for charges relating to his work on Terara Network, an Ethiopian media on YouTube he co-founded and managed. The court granted him bail for 50,000 Ethiopian Birr on 5 April, and he was released from prison on 6 April, after 118 days in prison.
