= Gomma (woreda) =

District in Oromia Region, Ethiopia

Coordinates: 7°50′N 36°40′E

Gomma is a woreda in Oromia Region, Ethiopia. It is named after the former Kingdom of Gomma, whose territory was roughly the same as the modern woreda. Part of the Jimma Zone, Gomma is bordered on the south by Seka Chekorsa, on the southwest by Gera, on the northwest by Setema, on the north by the Didessa River which separates it from the Illubabor Zone, on the northeast by Limmu Kosa, and on the east by Mana. Towns include Beshasha, Choche, Ghembe, and Limmu Shaye. Guma woreda was separated from Gomma.

== Overview ==
The altitude of this woreda ranges from 1,380 to 1,680 meters (4,530 to 5,510 ft) above sea level; however, some points along the southern and western boundaries have altitudes ranging from 2,229 to 2,870 meters (7,313 to 9,416 ft). A survey of the land in this woreda shows that 60.7% is arable or cultivable (52.7% was under annual crops), 8.1% pasture, 4.6% forest, and the remaining 20.1% is considered swampy, mountainous or otherwise unusable. Land in cultivation included the two state coffee farms. Fruits, avocadoes and spices are important cash crops.

Coffee is also an important cash crop in Gomma; over 50 square kilometers (19 sq mi) are planted with this crop. Coffee is grown in this woreda under shade trees; while the dominant species are Albizia gummifera, which can shade as many as 150 coffee trees, and Millettia ferruginea, other species are also used as shade trees.

Industry in the woreda includes 118 grain mills, 35 coffee hulling and 33 coffee pulping mills, one sawmill, an office and furniture factory, and one edible oil mill. There were 45 Farmers Associations with 45,226 members and 21 Farmers Service Cooperatives with 43,088 members. One micro-finance institution operates in this woreda: the Oromiyaa Credit and Saving SC (OCS), established in 1997; its branch in Gomma was one of the first the OCS opened. While mismanagement forced the OCS to close that branch within the year, it was reopened in 2001 and serves customers in Agaro and 17 of the 39 kebeles. Gomma has 55 kilometers (34 mi) of dry-weather and 89 km (55 mi) all-weather road, for an average of road density of 117 km (73 mi) per 1,000 square kilometers (390 sq mi). About 41% of the urban and 15.9% of the rural population has access to drinking water.

== Demographics ==
The 2007 national census reported a total population for this woreda of 213,023, of whom 108,637 were men and 104,386 were women; 12,769 or 5.99% of its population were urban dwellers. The majority of the inhabitants were Moslem, with 83.88% of the population reporting they observed this belief, while 14.68% of the population said they practised Ethiopian Orthodox Christianity, and 1.34% were Protestant.

Based on figures published by the Central Statistical Agency in 2005, this woreda has an estimated total population of 350,882, of whom 172,888 are men and 177,994 are women; 71,018 or 20.24% of its population are urban dwellers, which is greater than the Zone average of 12.3%. With an estimated area of 1,230.16 square kilometers (474.97 sq mi), Gomma has an estimated population density of 285.2 inhabitants per square kilometer (739/sq mi), which is greater than the Zone average of 150.6/km^{2} (390/sq mi).

The 1994 national census reported a total population for this woreda of 243,376, of whom 123,354 were men and 120,022 women; 39,663 or 16.3% of its population were urban dwellers at the time. The five largest ethnic groups reported in Gomma were the Oromo (79.11%), the Amhara (7.28%), the Kullo (4.2%), the Silt'e (2.6%), and the Kafficho (2.04%); all other ethnic groups made up 4.77% of the population. Oromiffa was spoken as a first language by 78.78%, 14.22% spoke Amharic, 2.43% Kullo, 1.14% Silt'e, and 1.12% spoke Kafa; the remaining 2.31% spoke all other primary languages reported. The majority of the inhabitants were Muslim, with 80.15% of the population having reported they practiced that belief, while 19.03% of the population said they professed Ethiopian Orthodox Christianity.
