= Setema =

District of Oromia, Ethiopia

Coordinates: 8°00′N 36°20′E

Setema is one of the woredas in the Oromia Region of Ethiopia. Located in the western part of the Jimma Zone, Setema is bordered on the south by Gera, on the west by Sigmo, on the north by the Illubabor Zone, and on the southeast by Gomma. The administrative center of the woreda is Gatira.

== Overview ==
The altitude of this woreda ranges from 2,250 to 3,010 metres (7,380 to 9,880 ft) above sea level. The highest points are in the Damu Siga mountain range. Perennial rivers include the Onja, Salako, Gidache and Gebba. A survey of the land in this woreda shows that 27.2% is arable or cultivable (20.8% was under annual crops), 13.1% pasture, 55.1% forest, and the remaining 4.6% is considered degraded, builtup or otherwise unusable. The majority of the Sigmo-Geba State Forest, about 100 square kilometres (39 sq mi) in size, is located in Setema. Teff, corn, and sheep are important cash crops. Although coffee is also an important cash crop in this woreda, less than 20 square kilometres (7.7 sq mi) are planted with this crop.

Industry in the woreda includes 32 grain mills. There were 18 Farmers Associations with 17,623 members and 5 Farmers Service Cooperatives with 7,562 members. Setema has 35 kilometres (22 mi) of all-weather road, for an average road density of 31.6 kilometres per 1,000 square kilometres (5 mi / 100 sq mi). About 60% of the urban and 9.6% of the rural population has access to drinking water.

== Demographics ==
The 2007 national census reported a total population for this woreda of 103,221, of whom 50,744 were men and 52,477 were women; 4,729 or 4.58% of its population were urban dwellers. The majority of the inhabitants were Moslem, with 96.91% of the population reporting they observed this belief, while 2.67% of the population said they practised Ethiopian Orthodox Christianity.

Based on figures published by the Central Statistical Agency in 2005, this woreda has an estimated total population of 117,275, of whom 59,069 are men and 58,206 are women; 4,147 or 3.54% of its population are urban dwellers, which is less than the Zone average of 12.3%. With an estimated area of 1,106.10 square kilometers, Setema has an estimated population density of 106 people per square kilometer, which is less than the Zone average of 150.6.

The 1994 national census reported a total population for this woreda of 84,655, of whom 42,234 were men and 42,421 women; 2,318 or 2.74% of its population were urban dwellers at the time. The three largest ethnic groups reported in Setema were the Oromo (96.48%), the Amhara (2.22%), and the Tigray (1.0%); all other ethnic groups made up 0.3% of the population. Oromiffa was spoken as a first language by 97.17%, 1.75% spoke Amharic, and 0.97% spoke Tigrinya; the remaining 0.11% spoke all other primary languages reported. The majority of the inhabitants were Muslim, with 96.84% of the population having reported they practiced that belief, while 2.89% of the population said they professed Ethiopian Orthodox Christianity.
