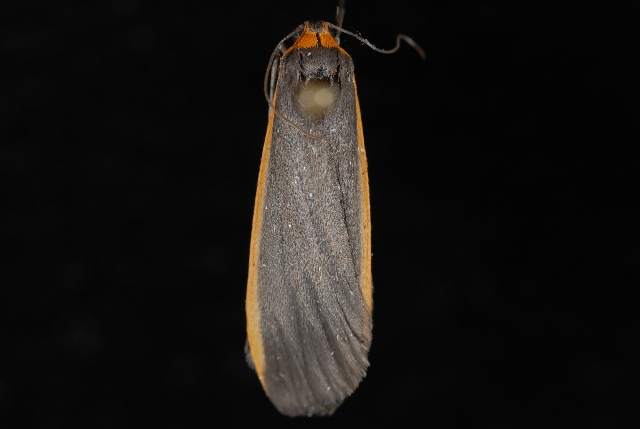

Scientific classification
- Kingdom: Animalia
- Phylum: Arthropoda
- Clade: Pancrustacea
- Class: Insecta
- Order: Lepidoptera
- Superfamily: Noctuoidea
- Family: Erebidae
- Subfamily: Arctiinae
- Genus: Setema
- Species: S. bicolor

Binomial name
- Setema bicolor (Grote, 1864)

Synonyms
- Lithosia bicolor Grote, 1864; Tigrioides bicolor (Grote, 1864); Lexis bicolor (Grote, 1864); Eilema bicolor (Grote, 1864); Manulea bicolor (Grote, 1864); Lithosia argillacea Packard, 1864

= Setema bicolor =

Species of moth

Setema bicolor, commonly known as the bicolored moth and yellow-edged footman, is a species of moth in the family Erebidae. It is found in boreal North America, from Labrador and Massachusetts to Yukon and British Columbia. In the Rocky Mountains, it ranges south to southern Colorado.

The length of the forewings is 13–17 mm. Adult males are on wing from July to August. Females are brachypterous.
