= List of political parties in Ethiopia =

This article lists political parties in Ethiopia. Ethiopia has a multi-party parliament. The legislature was mostly dominated by the Ethiopian People's Revolutionary Democratic Front, until it was succeeded by the Prosperity Party in December 2019. The latest general election would have taken place in August 2020, but was postponed due to the COVID-19 pandemic. The most recent general election took place in 2021.

== List ==
=== Parliamentary parties ===
Party	Political positions	Ideology	Created	House
Prosperity Party; Amharic: ብልጽግና ፓርቲ, romanized: Bilit͟s’igina Paritī; Oromo: Paartii Badhaadhiinaa; Somali: Xisbiga Barwaaqo	Centre	Ethiopian nationalism; Liberalism; Economic liberalism; Federalism	2019	410 / 547
National Movement of Amhara; Amharic: የአማራ ብሔራዊ ንቅናቄ, romanized: Ye’āmara Biḥērawī Nik’inak’ē	Centre-right to right-wing	Amhara self-determination; Liberalism	2018	5 / 547
Ethiopian Citizens for Social Justice; Amharic: የኢትዮጵያ ዜጎች ለማህበራዊ ፍትህ, romanized: Ye-Ïtiyop'iya Zēgochi Le-mahiberawī Fitih	Centre	Liberalism; Ethiopian nationalism	2019	4 / 547
Gedeo People's Democratic Party; Amharic: የጌዲዮን ህዝቦች ዲሞክራሲያዊ ፓርቲ		Gedeo interests; Regionalism	1992	2 / 547
Tigray People's Liberation Front; Tigrinya: ህዝባዊ ወያነ ሓርነት ትግራይ, romanized: Ḥəzbawi Wäyanä Ḥarənnät Təgray	Left-wing	Revolutionary democracy; Tigrayan nationalism	1975	0 / 547

=== Other national parties ===
National parties without members of parliament as of 5 October 2020 include:

Other national parties
Name	Native name	Ideology	Notes
Freedom and Equality Party	Amharic: ነጻነትና እኩልነት ፓርቲ	Moderate liberalism	Established in 2019
All Ethiopian National Movement	Amharic: የመላው ኢትዮጵያውያን ብሔራዊ ንቅናቄ	N/A	
All-Ethiopia Socialist Movement	Amharic: መላ ኢትዮጵያ ሶሻሊስት ንቅናቄ	Communism; Marxism–Leninism	Oldest communist party in Ethiopia. Member of the United Ethiopian Democratic Forces
Balderas Party	Amharic: ባልደራስ ፓርቲ	Liberalism; Ethiopian nationalism	Founded by political activist Eskinder Nega in 2019
Alliance for Freedom and Democracy	?	Self-determination	Coalition of former separatist groups.
Ethiopian Citizens for Social Justice	Amharic: የኢትዮጵያ ዜጎች ለማኅበራዊ ፍትህ, romanized: ye-Ïtiyop'iya zēgochi le-mahiberawī fitih	Social justice; Ethiopian nationalism	Created through the merger of 7 opposition parties.
Ethiopian Democratic League	Amharic: የኢትዮጵያ ዴሞክራሲያዊ ሊግ	N/A	Former member of the Coalition for Unity and Democracy.
Ethiopian Democratic Party	Amharic: ከኢትዮጵያዊያን ዴሞክራሲያዊ ፓርቲ	National liberalism; Economic liberalism; Pan-Ethiopianism	Member of Ethiopian Citizens for Social Justice.
Ethiopian Federal Democratic Unity Forum (Medrek)	Amharic: የኢትዮጵያ ፌዴራላዊ ዴሞክራሲያዊ አንድነት መድረክ	Social democracy; Democratic socialism; Ethnic federalism	Officially a coalition of 5 parties.
Ethiopian People's Revolutionary Party	Amharic: የኢትዮጵያ ሕዝባዊ አብዮታዊ ፓርቲ	Non-ethnic federalism	Former communist party.
Ethiopian Social Democratic Party	Amharic: ኢትዮጵያ ማህበረ-ዴሞክራሲ ፌደራላዊ ፓርቲ	Social democracy	Former member of the United Ethiopian Democratic Forces.
Ginbot 7	Amharic: ግንቦት 7	N/A	Political organisation.
Islamic Front for the Liberation of the Oromo	Oromo: Adda Islaama Bilisummaa Oromiyaa	Oromo self-determination	Oromo militant party.
Kefagn Patriotic Front	?	N/A	Formed by soldiers from the army of Mengistu Haile Mariam.
Oromo Federalist Congress	Oromo: Koongiresii Federalawaa Oromoo		Formed in 2012 from merger of OPC with OFDM.
Rainbow Ethiopia: Movement for Democracy and Social Justice	Amharic: ቀስተደመና ኢትዮጵያ ንቅናቄ ለዴሞክራሲና ለማህበራዊ ፍትህ	N/A	Former member of the Coalition for Unity and Democracy.
Sidama National Liberation Front	?	Sidama self-determination	Sidama militant group. Inactive.
Western Somali Democratic Party	Somali: Somali Galbed	Somali nationalism	Former separatist group.
Coalition of Ethiopian Federalist Forces	Amharic: የኢትዮጵያ ፌዴራሊስት ኃይሎች ጥምረት	Ethnic federalism; Revolutionary democracy	Political coalition.

=== Other regional parties ===
Regional parties
Name	Native name	Ideology	Created	Notes
All-Amhara People's Organization	Amharic: የመላው አማራ ሕዝብ ድርጅት	Minority politics	1993	Former member of the United Ethiopian Democratic Forces.
Afar Liberation Front	?	Afar interests		Former militant group turned political party.
Afar Revolutionary Democratic Unity Front	Afar: Qafar Uguugumoh Demokrasiyyoh Inkiinoh Fooca	Afar self-determination		Afar militant party.
Arena Tigray For Democracy and Sovereignty	Tigrinya: ዓረና ትግራይ ንዲሞክራሲን ንሉኣላዊነትን		early 2000s	
Assimba Democratic Party	Tigrinya: ዓሲምባ ዴሞክራሲያዊ ፖርቲ	Social democracy	Oct 2019	Irob based party
Ethiopian People's Patriotic Front	Amharic: የኢትዮጵያ ሕዝብ አርበኞች ግንባር	N/A		Rebel group formerly active in Eritrea.
Ethiopian Unity Patriots Front	?	Ethiopian nationalism; Anti-Ethnic federalism; Democracy; Nuer tribalism	c. 1993	Part of the Ethiopian People's Patriotic Front.
Harari People's Democratic Party	Amharic: የሐረሪ ሕዝብ ዴሞክራሲያዊ ፓረቲ	Minority politics		Harari minority party.
National Movement of Amhara	Amharic: የአማራ ብሔራዊ ንቅናቄ	Minority politics	Jun 2018	
Ogaden National Liberation Front	Somali: Jabhadda Waddaniga Xoraynta Ogaadeenya	Somali nationalism		Somali militant organisation.
Oromo Liberation Front	Oromo: Adda Bilisummaa Oromoo	Oromo nationalism; Socialism; Secularism	Dec 1973	Oromo armed movement and party.
Sheko and Mezenger People's Democratic Unity Organization	Amharic: የሸኮና መዠንገር ህዝቦች ዴሞክራሲያዊ ግንባር	Minority politics		Sheko and Mezenger minority party.
Southern Ethiopia Peoples' Democratic Coalition	?	Minority politics		A coalition from the Southern Nations, Nationalities, and Peoples' Region.
Tigray Democratic Solidarity	Tigrinya: ዲሞክራስያዊ ስምረት ትግራይ	Liberalism	May 2025	Tigrayan opposition party against the TPLF.
Tigray Democratic Party	Tigrinya: ትግራይ ዴሞክራሲያዊ ፓርቲ		Dec 2019	

== Defunct parties ==
Party	Abbr.	Ideology	Political position	Leader	Years active
Ethiopian People's Revolutionary Democratic Front የኢትዮጵያ ሕዝቦች አብዮታዊ ዲሞክራሲያዊ ግንባር	EPRDF	1991–2019: Revolutionary democracy; Democratic socialism; Social democracy; Ethnic federalism; Poly-ethnic nationalism; 1988–1991: Marxism–Leninism; Hoxhaism	1991–2019: Centre-left to left-wing; 1988–1991: Far-left	Abiy Ahmed	1988–2019
Workers' Party of Ethiopia የኢትዮጵያ ሠራተኞች ፓርቲ	WPE	Communism; Marxism–Leninism; Nationalism; Ethnic nationalism; Pan-Africanism	Far-left	Mengistu Haile Mariam	1984–1991
Commission for Organizing the Party of the Working People of Ethiopia የኢትዮጵያ ሰራተኞች ፓርቲ አደራጅ ኮሚሽን	COPWE	Communism; Marxism-Leninism; Pan-Africanism; African nationalism; Socialist patriotism	Far-left	Mengistu Haile Mariam	1979–1984
Common Front of Ethiopian Marxist–Leninist Organizations የኢትዮጵያ ማርክሲስት ሌኒኒስት ድርጅቶች ኅብረት	CFEM–LO	Communism; Marxism-Leninism	Far-left	Collective leadership	1977–1979
Provisional Office for Mass Organizational Affairs የሕዝብ ጽሕፈት ጊዜያዊ ጽሕፌት ቤት	POMOA	Communism; Marxism-Leninism	Far-left	Haile Fida	1975–1979

Other defunct parties
Name	Native name	Ideology	Notes
Unity for Democracy and Justice	?	Liberalism	Merged into Ethiopian Citizens for Social Justice.
Southern Ethiopian People's Democratic Movement	?	Social democracy; Democratic socialism; Federalism; Self-determination	Merged into the Prosperity Party.
Afar National Democratic Party	Amharic: የአፋር ብሔራዊ ዴሞክራሲያዊ ፓርቲ	Afar interests	Merged into the Prosperity Party.
Amhara Democratic Party	Amharic: አማራ ዴሞክራሲያዊ ፓርቲ	Amhara interests	Merged into the Prosperity Party.
Argoba Nationality Democratic Organization	Amharic: የአርጎባ ሕዝቦች ዴሞክራሲያዊ ንቅናቄ	Minority politics	Argoba minority party.
Benishangul-Gumuz People's Democratic Unity Front	Amharic: የቤንሻንጉልና ጉሙዝ ሕዝቦች ዴሞክራሲዊ አንድነት	Minority politics	Merged into the Prosperity Party.
Ethiopian Somali Democratic League	?	Minority politics	Somali ethnic party.
Somali Democratic Party	Amharic: የሶማሌ ዴሞክራሲዊ ፓርቲ	Democratic socialism	Merged into the Prosperity Party.
Gambela People's Democratic Movement	Amharic: የጋምቤላ ሕዝቦች ዴሞክራሲያዊ ንቅናቄ	Minority politics	Merged into the Prosperity Party.
Harari National League	Harari: ዚሐረሪ መሐዲያ ሊግ	Harari interests	Merged into the Prosperity Party.
Oromo Democratic Party	?	Marxism; Democratic socialism; Oromo self-determination	Merged into the Prosperity Party.
Oromo People's Congress	?	Minority politics	Former Oromo ethnic party. Merged with OFDM in 2012, creating OFC.
Oromo Federalist Democratic Movement	Oromo: Warraaqsa Federaalistii Uummata Oromoo	Federalism	2005–2012; Oromo party. Merged with OPC to create OFC.
Marxist–Leninist League of Tigray	?	Communism; Marxism–Leninism; Hoxhaism; Anti-revisionism	Semi-clandestine group within the TPLF.
Abyotawit Seded	Amharic: አብዮታዊ ሰደድ	Communism	Political organisation led by Mengistu Haile Mariam.
Echat	?	Communism	DERG-era predecessor to the Oromo Liberation Front.
Ethiopian Marxist–Leninist Revolutionary Organization	?	Communism; Marxism–Leninism	Early DERG-era organisation.
Waz League	?	Communism; Marxism	Minor predecessor to the Workers Party of Ethiopia.
All Ethiopian Unity Party	?	N/A	Former member of the Coalition for Unity and Democracy.
Semayawi Party	?	Liberalism	Merged into Ethiopian Citizens for Social Justice.
Coalition for Unity and Democracy	Amharic : ቅንጅት ለአንድነት እና ዴሞክራሲ	Ethiopian nationalism; Civic nationalism; Liberalism; Federalism; Populism	Former coalition.
Coalition of Ethiopian Democratic Forces	?	Communism; Socialism	Formed by former arch-rivals MEISON and Ihapa.
United Ethiopian Democratic Forces	Amharic: የኢትዮጵያ ዴሞክራሲዊ ኃይሎቸ ሕብረት	Social democracy; Social liberalism	Former coalition.
Ethiopian Democratic Union	?	Conservatism; Monarchism; Anti-communism	Helped form the Ethiopian Democratic Party.
Gambela People's Democratic Unity Party	?	Nuer interests	Formed due to mass displacement of Nuer people.
Gambela People's Liberation Movement	?	Nuer interests; National liberation; Anti-communism	Former rebel group.
Horyaal Democratic Front	?	Somali nationalism; Separatism	Former Gadabuursi clan paramilitary group.
Issa and Gurgura Liberation Front	?	Somali nationalism; Issa interests; Gurgura interests	Former clan-based rebel group.

== Notes ==
1. In 2022, a party of the same name sent in application for a registration license, it was denied by The National Election Board of Ethiopia (NEBE) in August of the same year.
