= Politics of Ethiopia =

The politics of Ethiopia are the activities associated with the governance of Ethiopia. The government is structured as a federal parliamentary republic with both a President and Prime Minister. The legislature is multicameral, with a house of representatives and a council. The term politics of Ethiopia mainly relates to the political activities in Ethiopia after the late 20th century when democratization took place in the nation. The current political structure of Ethiopia was formed after the Tigrayan People's Liberation Front (TPLF) overthrew dictator President Mengistu Haile Mariam in 1991. A general election was held in June 1994 and Ethiopia has maintained a multiparty political environment until today.

== Government of Ethiopia ==
The government of Ethiopia is structured in the form of a federal parliamentary republic, whereby the Prime Minister is the head of government. Executive power is exercised by the government while legislative power is vested in the Parliament. The Judiciary is more or less independent of the executive and the legislature. There are 12 ethnically based administrative regions and two self-governing administrations; the capital city Addis Ababa and Dire Dawa.

The president of Ethiopia is elected by the House of Peoples' Representatives for a six-year term. The prime minister is chosen by the parliament. The prime minister is designated by the party in power following legislative elections. The Council of Ministers, according to the 1995 constitution, is comprised by the Prime Minister, the Deputy Prime Ministers, various Ministers and other members as determined and approved by the House of Peoples' Representatives. At the current time, this includes the 20 members of Council of Ministers.

The Federal Parliamentary Assembly has two chambers: the House of Peoples' Representatives (Yehizbtewekayoch Mekir Bet) with 547 members, elected for five-year terms in single-seat constituencies; and the Council of the Federation (Yefedereshn Mekir Bet) with 110 members, one for each nationality, and one additional representative for each one million of its population, designated by the regional councils, which may elect them themselves or through popular elections.

The president and vice president of the Federal Supreme Court are recommended by the prime minister and appointed by the House of Peoples' Representatives; for other federal judges, the prime minister submits candidates selected by the Federal Judicial Administrative Council to the People's Representatives for appointment.

== Recent history ==
In May 1991, a coalition of rebel forces under the name Tigrayan People's Liberation Front (TPLF) overthrew the dictatorship of President Mengistu Haile Mariam. In July 1991, the TPLF, the Oromo Liberation Front (OLF), the Ogaden National Liberation Front, Western Somali Liberation Front, Oromo People's Democratic Organization (OPDO), Amhara National Democratic Movement (ANDM) and others established the Transitional Government of Ethiopia (TGE), which consisted of an 87-member Council of Representatives guided by a national charter that functioned as a transitional constitution. Since 1991, Ethiopia has established warm relations with the United States and western Europe and has sought substantial economic aid from Western countries and the World Bank.

In June 1992, the OLF withdrew from the government; in March 1993, members of the Southern Ethiopia Peoples' Democratic Coalition left the government. The Eritrean People's Liberation Front (EPLF), an ally in the fight against the Mengistu regime, assumed control of Eritrea and established a provisional government. Eritrea achieved full independence on May 24, 1993.

President Meles Zenawi and members of the TGE pledged to oversee the formation of a multi-party democracy. The first election for Ethiopia's 547-member constituent assembly was held in June 1994. This assembly adopted the constitution of the Federal Democratic Republic of Ethiopia in December 1994. The elections for Ethiopia's first popularly chosen national parliament and regional legislatures were held in May and June 1995. Most opposition parties chose to boycott these elections. There was a landslide victory for the Ethiopian People's Revolutionary Democratic Front (EPRDF). International and non-governmental observers concluded that opposition parties would have been able to participate had they chosen to do so.

The Government of the Federal Democratic Republic of Ethiopia was installed in August 1995. The first President was Negasso Gidada. The EPRDF-led government of Prime Minister Meles promoted a policy of ethnic federalism, seemingly devolving significant powers to regional, ethnically based authorities. Ethiopia today has nine semi-autonomous Regions of Ethiopia that have the power to raise and spend their own revenues.

In 2004, the government began a resettlement initiative to move more than two million people away from the arid highlands of the east, proposing that these resettlements would reduce food shortages.

The ruling party, EPRDF was declared a winner by the election board in 2000, and then again in 2005 amidst protests and riots that led to the death of many Ethiopians. Hundreds of political leaders–some of whom were elected to parliamentary positions– were arrested in connection with these protests. The incumbent president in 2013 was Mulatu Teshome who resigned in 2018.

Human rights organisations have raised concerns over the well-being of some of these prisoners. However 8,000 prisoners have already been freed.

On 5 August 2016, protests broke out across the country and dozens of protesters were shot and killed by police over the following days. The protesters demanded an end to human rights abuses, the act of land grabbing by the ruling party members and relatives of the higher officials, the master plan intended to expand Addis Ababa onto surrounding zones of the Oromia region including the farm land of oromo people (special zones of oromia around Addis Ababa), the release of political prisoners, a fairer redistribution of the wealth generated by over a decade of economic growth, and a return of Wolqayt District to the Amhara Region. The events were the most violent crackdown against protesters in Sub-Saharan Africa since the Ethiopian regime killed at least 75 people during protests in the Oromia Region in November and December 2015.

In the wake of significant unrest, the TPLF lost control of the EPDRF, with Prime Minister Hailemariam Desalegn, announcing his resignation as head of the EPDRF in 2018. Abiy Ahmed, who had become Prime Minister after winning the EPDRF leadership elections in April 2018 subsequently dissolved the EPDRF. He replaced it with the Prosperity Party, a coalition which includes all former members of the EPDRF but notably excluded the TPLF. This kickstarted a period of growing tension between the government and the TPLF, which culminated in the Tigray War that began in 2020.

The Economist Intelligence Unit rated Ethiopia an "authoritarian regime" in 2022.

== Political parties and elections ==
In the 2015 general election, Opposition parties lost the only seat which they still held in the House of Peoples' Representatives. The Ethiopian People's Revolutionary Democratic Front and its allies won all 547 seats.

Political pressure groups include the Council of Alternative Forces for Peace and Democracy in Ethiopia (CAFPDE) Beyene Petros and the Southern Ethiopia People's Democratic Coalition (SEPDC) [Beyene Petros].

The coalition of opposition parties and some individuals that was established in 2009 to oust at the general election in 2010 the regime of the TPLF, Meles Zenawi's party that has been in power since 1991, published a 65-page manifesto in Addis Ababa on October 10, 2009.

Some of the eight-member parties of this Ethiopian Forum for Democratic Dialogue (FDD or Medrek in Amharic) include the Oromo Federalist Congress (organized by the Oromo Federalist Democratic Movement and the Oromo People's Congress), the Arena Tigray (organized by former members of the ruling party TPLF), the Unity for Democracy and Justice (UDJ, whose leader was imprisoned), and the Coalition of Somali Democratic Forces.

=== 2005 Ethiopian general elections ===
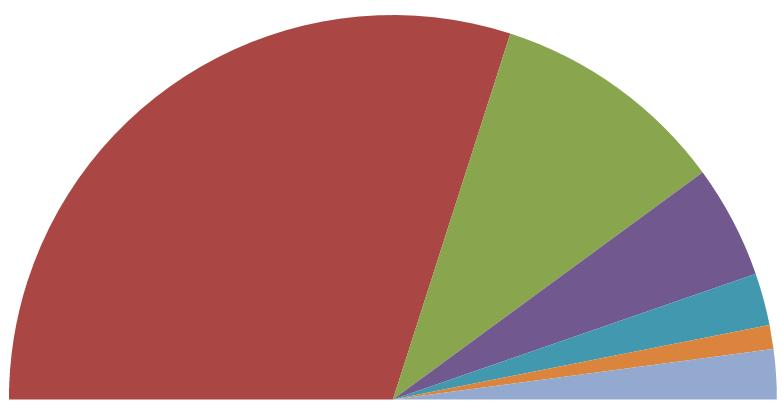
Ethiopian general election 2005. Only parties with more than 10 seats shown. Red: EPRDF Green: CUD Purple: UEDF Dark blue: SPDP Orange: OFDM Light blue: Others

Ethiopia held its third general election in May 2005, which drew a record number of voters, with 90% of the electorate turning out to cast their vote. While the election was deemed by the European Union election observer team to fall short of international standards for fair and free elections, other teams drew different conclusions. The African Union report on September 14 commended "the Ethiopian people's display of genuine commitment to democratic ideals"; on September 15, the US Carter Center concluded that "the majority of the constituency results based on the May 15 polling and tabulation are credible and reflect competitive conditions". The US Department of State said on September 16, "these elections stand out as a milestone in creating a new, more competitive multi-party political system in one of Africa's largest and most important countries." Even the EU preliminary statement of 2005 also said "...the polling processes were generally positive. The overall assessment of the process has been rated as good in 64% of the cases, and very good in 24%".

The opposition complained that the ruling EPRDF engaged in widespread vote rigging and intimidation, alleging fraud in 299 constituencies. The ruling party complained that the main opposition party CUD's AEUP sub party had engaged in intimidation. All allegations were investigated by the National Electoral Board of Ethiopia in cooperation with election monitors, a process which delayed the release of the final results. In June 2005, with the results of the election still unclear, a group of university students protested these alleged discrepancies, encouraged by supporters of the Coalition for Unity opposition party, despite a ban on protests imposed by the government. On June 8, 26 people were killed in Addis Ababa as a result of rioting, which led to the arrest of hundreds of protesters. On September 5, 2005, the National Elections Board of Ethiopia released the final election results, which confirmed that the ruling Ethiopian People's Revolutionary Democratic Front retained its control of the government, but showed that opposition parties had increased their share of parliamentary seats, from 12 to 176. The Coalition for Unity and Democracy won all the seats in Addis Ababa, both for the Parliament and the City Council.

In February 2006, UK Prime Minister Blair, acknowledging that the EPRDF has won the election, said he wanted to see Ethiopia resolve its internal problems and continue on a democratic path.

With Ethiopia's national election in May 2010 approaching, some opposition groups begun to hint a boycott, accusing the government of stepping up harassment against them. Despite growing claims of "harassment" and "undemocratic actions" perpetrated by the ruling party, the Forum for Democratic Dialogue (FDD), Ethiopia's biggest alliance of opposition political parties declared in October 2009 that it will contest in the scheduled election.

Gebru Asrat, a former ally of PM Meles Zenawi, said that his party's primary efforts were "to engage in negotiation with the government on key election issues" ahead of the election, but he added that the government was reluctant.

FDD insists to engage in a pre-election negotiation on 10 key subjects, among which the issues of access to the media for campaigning, the supremacy of law, the free access of international observers, the establishment of an independent electoral board and a stop to harassment and pressure on opposition members.

=== 2010 Ethiopian general elections ===
The EPRDF won the 2010 elections by a landslide, taking 499 seats, while allied parties took a further 35. Oppositions parties took just two. Both opposition groups say their observers were blocked from entering polling stations during the election on Sunday, May 23, and in some cases the individuals were beaten. The United States and the European Union have both criticized the election as falling short of international standards. Additionally, the EPRDF won all but one of 1,904 council seats in regional elections.

== International organization participation ==
ACP, AfDB, ECA, FAO, G-24, G-77, IAEA, IBRD, ICAO, ICRM, IDA, IFAD, IFC, IFRCS, IGAD, ILO, IMF, IMO, Intelsat, Interpol, IOC, IOM (observer), ISO, ITU, NAM, OAU, OPCW, United Nations, UNCTAD, UNESCO, UNHCR, UNIDO, UNU, UPU, WCO, WFTU, WHO, WIPO, WMO, WToO.

Scheye wrote in 2010 that significant donor resources are being invested in security sector reform in Ethiopia because of donor national interest, even though the country's ruling group is ideologically opposed to the core principles of SSR, and showed, at that time, little interest in justice and security sector development.

The Guardian wrote just before the 2015 elections that "..the EPRDF's relations with donors are a crucial factor in maintaining its position. Ethiopia remains structurally dependent on aid, with the country receiving more than $3 billion a year from the Organisation for Economic Co-operation and Development. However, all indications are that external support will remain strong, regardless of electoral openness. Ethiopia is a key partner for countries concerned about security in the region, especially the US, UK and the European Union."

== Royalists and government in exile ==
A group of Ethiopian royalists continue to operate The Crown Council of Ethiopia as a government in exile.
