= Elections in Ethiopia =

Under the current constitution, Ethiopia conducts local, regional, and federal elections. At the federal level, Ethiopia elects a legislature. The Federal Parliamentary Assembly has two chambers: the House of Peoples' Representatives (ተወካዮች ምክር ቤት Yehizbtewekayoch Mekir Bet) with not more than 550 members as per the constitution but actually nearly 547 members, elected for five-year terms in single-seat constituencies; and the Council of the Federation (Yefedereshn Mekir Bet) with 117 members, one each from the 22 minority nationalities, and one from each professional sector of its remaining nationalities, designated by the regional councils, which may elect them themselves or through popular elections.

Ethiopia is a dominant-party state in that a coalition, the Prosperity Party, is the strongest party in the country. Reforms to political party legislation have opened up for opposition parties to operate in the country and many have been registered under the new law, but the Prosperity Party remains the dominant party in the political landscape.

== History ==
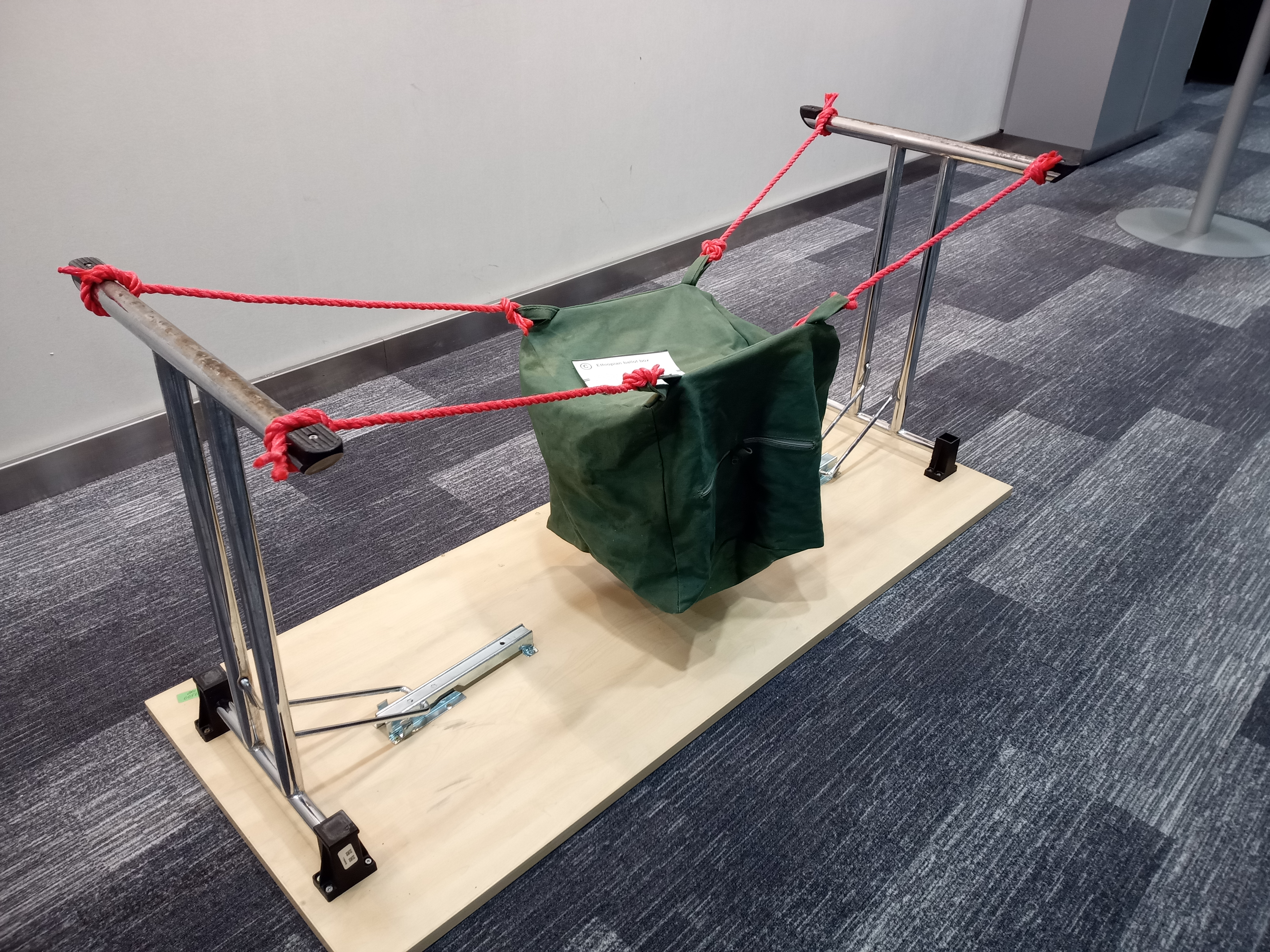
A type of ballot box used in Ethiopian elections

Although the history of Ethiopia is dotted with non-democratic systems of government such as the Abyssinian, Jimma, Harar, Wolayta Kingdoms, many of these states also had or reigned over egalitarian political systems that allowed popular participation similar to the ones in ancient Greece or Western Africa. The most commonly cited example of the egalitarian governance structures is the Gada System of the Oromo People that had an peer group based system with developed legislative bodies. In addition to the Gada, and similar systems among the Mursi, Gurage, Sidamo, Kambata, Somali People; the "Bayto" and "Risti" systems among the Tigray and the elected variants of the "Abat" and "Rist" systems o f the Amhara have been considered to be pre-modern democratic systems that predate the current constitutional order.

The first modern elections in Ethiopia took place during the imperial regime under Haile Selassie I. These were followed by a referendum by the Military ("Derg") regime to approve the constitution of the People's Democratic Republic of Ethiopia. The first legally mandated multi-party (regional) contests took place in 1992 and were followed by the election of the members of the Constituent Assembly (which drafted the 1995 Constitution). These early democratic exercises and the referendum to approve the current constitution were held under the Transitional Period Charter of Ethiopia.

General elections have since been held in 1995, 2000, 2005, 2010 and 2015, 2021 and 2026.

== 1995 general elections ==
The 1995 elections were preceded by a post-socialist liberalization that saw Ethiopia's accession to international human rights treaties and the legalization of independent newspapers and political parties. However, it also took place after a number of potentially significant opposition parties such as the OLF, COEDF, EPRP and MEISON were either barred or withdrew from local elections conducted in 2012 and constitutional assembly elections in 1994. General elections were held in Ethiopia on 7 and 18 May 1995 for seats in its Council of People's Representatives; elections in the Afar, Somali, and Harari Regions were delayed until 28 June to assign experienced personnel who could solve possible conflicts and irregularities. Although this was the first multi-party election in Ethiopia, several opposition parties boycotted the election. The parties boycotting the election included the All-Amhara People's Organization, Council of Alternative Forces for Peace and Democracy in Ethiopia, and Ethiopian Democratic Unity Party.

== 2000 general elections ==
Ethiopia held general elections on 14 May and 31 August 2000 for seats in both its national House of Peoples' Representatives and several regional government councils. Although several opposition parties boycotted the election, 17 parties including the All-Amhara People's Organization, the Southern Ethiopia Peoples' Democratic Coalition (SEPDC), and the Oromo National Congress did participate.

In round one, held on 14 May, there were 20,252,000 registered voters, of whom 90% voted. the Ethiopian People's Revolutionary Democratic Front (EPRDF) member parties captured 481 of the 547 seats in the national election. Independents won 13 seats and other parties won 53. Six of the seven constituencies in the Hadiya Zone where elections were run, were won by the Hadiya National Democratic Organization led by Beyene Petros.

The second round was held on 31 August for the Somali Region alone, with 23 seats reserved for the region in the House of Peoples' Representatives and the 168 seats in the State Council. About 75% of the 1.15 million registered voters in the Region cast ballots. Announced results gave 19 of the seats to the SPDP, and the remaining four to independent candidates.

In the Regional elections, either the EPRDF or one of its member parties won the election except in Afar (where the Afar National Democratic Party won 84 of the 87 local seats), Benishangul-Gumuz (where the Benishangul Gumuz People's Democratic Unity Front won 71 of the 80 seats), Gambela (where the Gambela People's Democratic Front won 40 of the 53 seats), and Somali (where the Somali People's Democratic Party won 150 of the 168 seats).

According to observers organized by Ethiopian Human Rights Council, local U.N. staff, diplomatic missions, political parties, and domestic non-governmental organizations, both the general and the regional elections that year were generally free and fair in most areas; however, serious election irregularities occurred in the Southern Nations, Nationalities and Peoples' Region (SNNPR), particularly in the Hadiya Zone.

== 2005 general elections ==
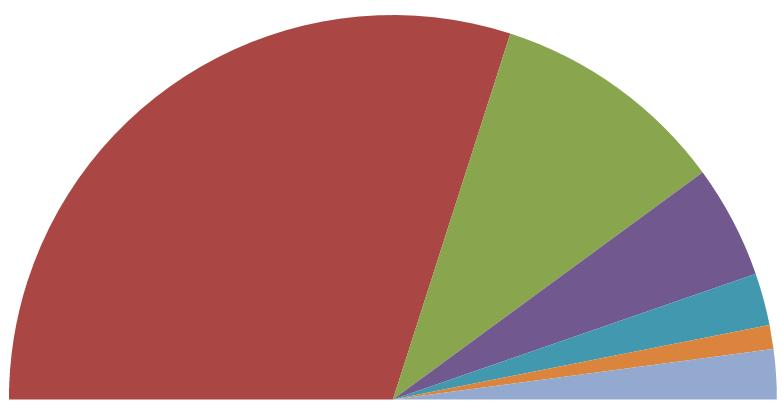
Ethiopian 2005 general election results. Only parties with more than 10 seats shown. Red: EPRDF Green: CUD Purple: UEDF Dark blue: SPDP Orange: OFDM Light blue: Others

The 2005 elections were preceded by much optimism as many opposition parties that boycotted previous elections announced their participation and formed coalitions to counter the incumbency of the EPRDF. The EPRDF also seemed to welcome the prospect of free and fair elections as it agreed to restructure the Electoral Board (NEBE), promised to cease restrictions on opposition activities, and allowed free access to observers. Parliamentary elections took place on 15 May 2005, with a reported 90% turnout. Human Rights Watch has accused the Ethiopian government of stifling political dissent and criticism in Oromia, Ethiopia's most populous region. The government has denied these allegations, and cited the occurrence of an opposition rally attended by 250,000 people on 8 May as an example of political freedom in the country.

Provisional results were scheduled to be announced on 21 May, and official results 8 June; however, due to hundreds of claims of election irregularities from all political parties involved, the provisional results were delayed until 8 June to allow the complaints to be fully investigated. On 9 August, official results were released, acknowledging that the ruling EPRDF had won 296 of the total 524 seats - about 56 percent - enabling it to form a government. However, Berhanu Nega, vice-chairman of the Coalition for Unity and Democracy, had criticized the process, claiming that "The investigation process was a complete failure. Our representatives and witnesses have been harassed, threatened, barred and killed upon their return from the hearings." Repeat elections were scheduled for 21 August in 31 areas where either irregularities were reported or results were challenged. Additionally, general elections in the Somali Region were held on 21 August. On 5 September, the National Election Board of Ethiopia released its final results, in which the EPRDF retained its control of the government with 327 seats and opposition parties won 174 seats.

At the time, the 2005 elections were considered to be the most democratic in Ethiopia's history, where the government no longer won an overwhelming majority – according to even the contested official results the EPRDF secured a mere 59.7% of the seats in parliament. Following the refusal of major opposition parties to join parliament, who demanded the EPRDF relinquish power and called for nationwide protests, the tension and street violence quickly escalated. The government's violent crackdown on the opposition was followed by what seemed to be a permanent course-reversal on democratic gains. The violent end of the 2005 elections ushered in a decade in which the EPRDF would win almost all seats in parliament justified under the broad rubric of "Revolutionary Democracy". The doctrine of Revolutionary Democracy was considered an official ideology and was being incorporated into the legal system until Abiy Ahmed assumed the premiership in April 2018.

== 2010 general elections ==
A parliamentary election took place on 23 May 2010.

As of 25 May 2010, preliminary election results indicated that the ruling EPRDF party had won 499 of the 536 seats in parliament. The provisional results indicated the EPRDF had won a landslide victory in 9 of the 11 regions and cities. 90% of eligible voters participated the election. Chief European Union (EU) observer Thijs Berman reported that the elections were "peaceful and well organised", but noted an "uneven playing field" and criticized the use of state resources in the EPRDF campaign. The EU received numerous reports of intimidation and harassment, but indicated that this did not necessarily affect the outcome of the elections.

The eight-party Medrek coalition won only a single seat in the capital Addis Ababa. Medrek had expected better results in the Oromia Region. Medrek leader Merera Gudina rejected the election results as being "completely fraudulent" and indicated that the coalition is considering what action to take. Human Rights Watch had condemned the election as "multi-party theatre staged by a single party state". Election and government officials have denied such charges. Opposition leaders have claimed that their supporters have been subject to harassment and beatings. In March 2010, an opposition politician was stabbed to death, but the government blamed the killing on a personal dispute. A Wall Street Journal article suggests that Medrek had spent much of its energy on coalition-building. International reporters have given the election wide media coverage.

African Union (AU) election observers reported that the election was completely "free and fair" and met all AU election standards. In spite of the opposition's objections, the AU stated that the election "reflected voters' will." The AU observers also reported that opposition party observers were present in most of the polling stations that the AU observed, and found no evidence to support the opposition's charges of pre-election intimidation. At the same time, chief AU observer and former President of Botswana Ketumile Masire noted that "the AU were unable to observe the pre-election period. The participating parties expressed dissatisfaction with the pre-election period. They did not have freedom to campaign. We had no way of verifying the allegations." Masire said that the National Election Board of Ethiopia (NEBE) handled the election in a professional manner and did not interfere with the electoral materials.

Prime Minister Meles Zenawi attributed the election results to the EPRDF's past performance, in particular citing the country's economic growth. According to the International Monetary Fund, Ethiopia's economy grew 9.9% in 2009 and was expected to grow 7% in 2010. Some analysts suggest that the result is a combination of the EPRDF's performance along with state-sponsored intimidation of the opposition.

On 21 June 2010, the NEBE released the final election results, which confirmed the preliminary results from the previous month. The EPRDF won 499 of the 547 available parliamentary seats, opposition or independent candidates won two seats, and EPRDF-allied parties won the remaining seats. Additionally, the EPRDF won all but one of 1,904 council seats in regional elections. The opposition had filed appeals with the election board and the Ethiopian Supreme Court, but both appeals were rejected. On 20 July, the Court of Cassation, Ethiopia's highest court, rejected the opposition's final appeal.

== 2015 general elections ==
Parliamentary elections were held in Ethiopia on 24 May 2015. The result was a victory for the ruling EPRDF, which won 500 of the 547 seats. Allies of the EPRDF won the remaining seats.

== 2021 general elections ==
This election was postponed by the ruling party citing concerns over the COVID-19 pandemic. The general elected was held on 21 June 2021 while the regional states election commenced on 30 September. It was the first multiparty election in Ethiopia since 2005.

The election resulted in the landslide victory of the Prosperity Party, which is the ruling party with 457 seats and 89.18 votes.

== 2026 general elections ==
The 2026 general election was conducted on 1 June 2026. It is the first general election to change in term length since the 1995 election due to constitutional amendment such as transitioning parliamentary system to presidential.

== See also ==
- National Election Board of Ethiopia
- Electoral calendar
- Electoral system
