= 2010 Ethiopian general election =

← 2005	23 May 2010	2015 →

All 547 seats in the House of Peoples' Representatives 274 seats needed for a majority
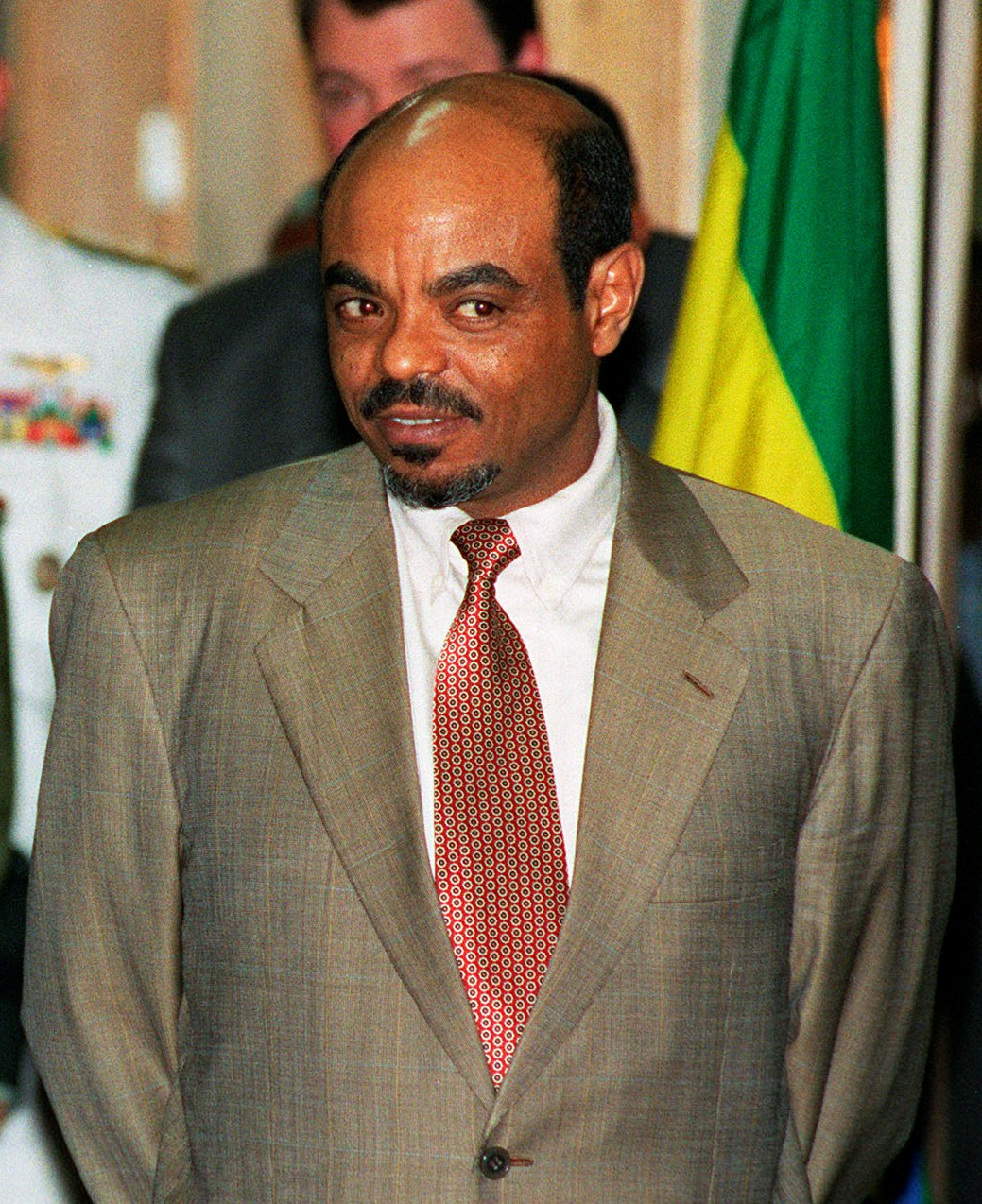
	First party
Leader	Meles Zenawi
Party	TPLF
Alliance	EPRDF
Last election	327
Seats won	499
Seat change	▲172
Prime Minister before election
Meles Zenawi
EPRDF
Prime Minister
Meles Zenawi
EPRDF

General elections were held in Ethiopia on 23 May 2010. There was a total of 4,525 candidates running for the open positions—which included 547 seats in the House of Peoples' Representatives; 1,349 of whom were members of the ruling Ethiopian People's Revolutionary Democratic Front (EPRDF), 374 members of parties loosely aligned with the EPRDF, 2,798 members of opposition parties, and 4 independent candidates.

== Conduct ==
The incumbent party EPRDF and opposition parties signed the Election Code of Conduct. They agreed on time allocation of public media, though the opposition leaders complained about the time allocated to them, saying that it was unfair for the ruling party to take the highest share of the time. The parties participated in a campaign debate that was broadcast on the public television, ETV. One opposition party, the All Ethiopian Unity Party (AEUP), expressed serious concern and walked out of the debate after requesting that the debate be transmitted live and in the presence of the public.

Based on the violence associated with the previous general election, on 13 April 2010 the U.S. State Department issued a travel alert "before and after national parliamentary elections scheduled for May 23, 2010, and recommends against all but essential travel to Ethiopia during this period." The travel alert pointed out that "U.S. citizens [should] ... maintain a high level of security awareness at all times and avoid political rallies, demonstrations, and crowds of any kind. U.S. citizens should avoid polling places on election day, and be aware that authorities will strictly enforce specific prohibitions such as photography at polling stations."

Opposition parties expressed their concern that the election would lead to violence and that their supporters would be arrested and imprisoned. Beyene Petros was reported to have claimed to United States diplomatic personnel that "EPRDF cadres in Eastern Wolaita" attacked opposition party leaders and vandalized their cars when they attempted to register candidates in that part of Ethiopia. Opposition leader Merera Gudina stated that, because the ruling EPRDF controls all local administrations, the election would be a struggle to prevent Ethiopia from becoming a one-party state.

European election observers said that the election fell short of international standards. According to Human Rights Watch, the government had a strategy to systematically close down space for political dissent and independent criticism.

According to Amnesty International, the final report of the EU Election Observation Mission highlighted violations of freedom of expression, assembly, and movement of opposition party members; misuse of state resources by the ruling party; and a lack of independent media coverage. The Prime Minister described the report as "useless trash" and the Chief EU Observer was not granted access to Ethiopia to present the final report.

== Results ==
According to early results released by the election board, the EPRDF was on course for victory, leading the vote count in all of Ethiopia's regions. The chairman of the election board, Merga Bekana, announced that the EPRDF had "definitely" won the election following its lead in 9 of 11 regions that had reported results, including the former opposition-dominated region of Oromia. Human Rights Watch claimed the results were affected by government intimidation of voters over a period of months. European Union observers stated the election was "peaceful and calm," but noted there were claims of irregularities. 90% of eligible voters turned out for the election.

Preliminary results, with 11 election districts not yet having reported results, were as follows:

- EPRDF: 499 seats
- allied parties: 35 seats
- opposition parties: 2 seats

Opposition groups rejected the election results, with both the Medrek coalition and the separate AEUP issuing calls for a re-run of the election. Both opposition groups said that their observers were blocked from entering polling stations during the election on Sunday, May 23, and in some cases, the individuals beaten. The United States and the European Union both criticized the election as falling short of international standards.

However, Ethiopian government officials defended the results as accurately reflecting the mood of the people. The Ethiopian ambassador to the United Kingdom, Berhanu Kebede, claimed that voters had rewarded Meles Zenawi and his party for their achievements saying, "The government has registered successful development and growth policies. There has been double-digit growth for the past seven years. Primary school and health sector coverage have greatly improved. There has been more investment in infrastructure in the past 10 years than in the previous 100."

On 21 June 2010, the NEBE released the final election results, which confirmed the preliminary results from the previous month. The EPRDF won 499 of the 547 available parliamentary seats, opposition or independent candidates won 2 seats, and EPRDF-allied parties won the remaining seats. Additionally, the EPRDF won all but one of 1,904 council seats in regional elections. The opposition filed appeals with the election board and the Ethiopian Supreme Court, but both appeals were rejected. On July 20, the Court of Cassation, Ethiopia's highest court, rejected the opposition's final appeal.

Party or alliance		Votes	%	Seats	+/–
EPRDF and allies	Ethiopian People's Revolutionary Democratic Front			499	+172
EPRDF and allies	Ethiopian Somali People's Democratic Party			24	0
EPRDF and allies	Benishangul-Gumuz People's Democratic Party			9	+1
EPRDF and allies	Afar National Democratic Party			8	0
EPRDF and allies	Gambela People's Democratic Movement			3	0
EPRDF and allies	Argoba People's Democratic Organization			1	New
EPRDF and allies	Hareri National League			1	0
EPRDF and allies	Total			545	+174
Medrek				1	New
Coalition for Unity and Democracy				0	–109
Oromo Federalist Democratic Movement				0	–11
United Ethiopian Democratic Forces				0	–53
Independents				1	0
Total				547	0
Total votes		29,832,190	–		
Registered voters/turnout		31,926,520	93.44		
Source: African Elections Database

== See also ==
- Human rights in Ethiopia
