= 2015 Ethiopian general election =

- 24 May 2015

All 547 seats to the House of Peoples' Representatives
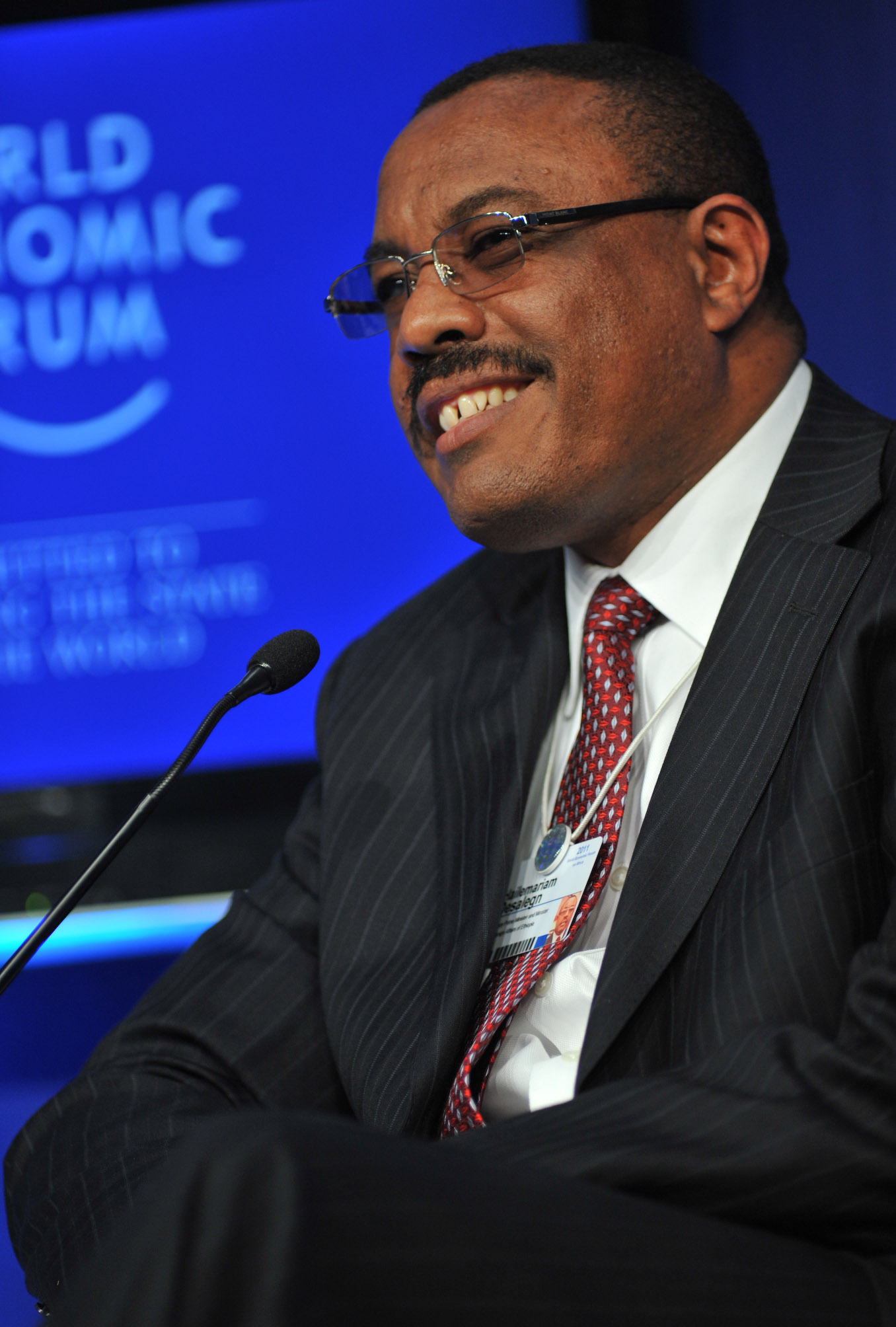

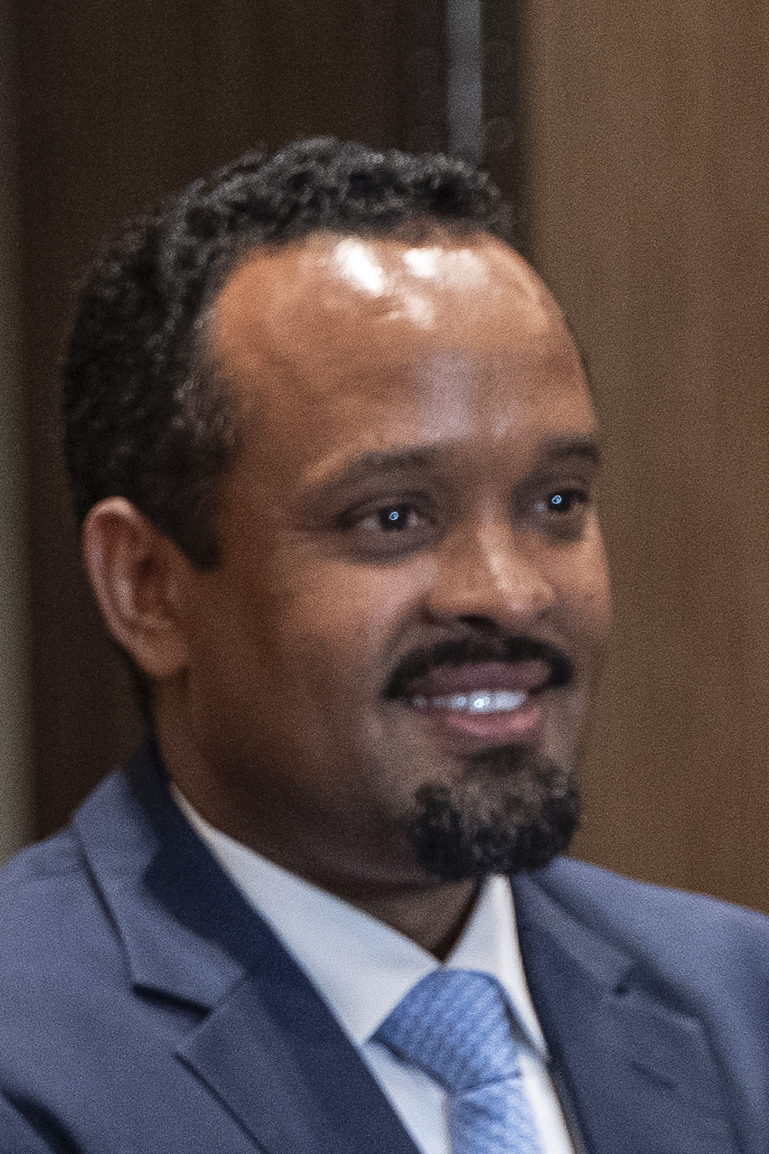
	Majority party	Minority party
Leader	Hailemariam Desalegn	Ahmed Shide
Party	EPRDF	ESPDP
Last election	499	24
Seats won	500	24
Seat change	▲1	Steady
Prime Minister before election
Hailemariam Desalegn
EPRDF
Prime Minister
Hailemariam Desalegn
EPRDF

General elections were held in Ethiopia on 24 May 2015 to elect officials to the House of Peoples' Representatives. Regional Assembly elections were also held on this date.

The result was a victory for the ruling Ethiopian People's Revolutionary Democratic Front (EPRDF), which won 500 of the 547 seats. Allies of the EPRDF won the remaining seats. Only 5.1% of the valid votes (less than 1.7 million) went to opposition parties.

== Electoral system ==
The 547 members of the House of Peoples' Representatives (the lower chamber of parliament) were elected in single-member constituencies using the first-past-the-post system. The results of the election were announced one month after the election took place. About 93.2 percent of Ethiopia’s 36.8 million registered voters participated in the parliamentary elections, and nearly 1.4 million (3.3%) of the total votes cast for the election were deemed "invalid." This number exceeded even the number of votes which went to any individual opposition party, highlighting the dire circumstances for opposition in the election. Invalid ballots could be discarded as such for a variety of reasons according to Ethiopia's electoral laws. As outlined by Ethiopian paper The Reporter after the election: "a ballot paper is deemed invalid where the identity of the elector is disclosed, the ballot paper is not marked or difficult to determine the intention of the voter, [voted] for more candidates than the allowed. But as was witnessed during vote counting in some polling stations, discarding ballots as invalid was not always a clear cut conclusion."

The elections were delayed in the Gimbo Gawata constituency due to clashes between the EPRDF and an independent candidate, Ashebr Woldegiorgis, who filed formal complaints against the EPRDF after coming in second at 17.7% of the region's votes. Polling took place on 14 June.

== Campaign ==
A total of 1,828 candidates contested the 547 seats, of which nine were independents and the remainder represented 44 parties. Of the 1,828 candidates, 1,527 were men and 801 women.

To help voters make informed decisions for the May Federal and National Elections, the Joint Council of Political Parties selected nine subjects as the agendas for televised debates between the political parties in the planned televised debating sessions. The subjects identified for debate in the televised election programs cover a variety of subjects: the Multi-Party System and Building Democracy; Federalism; Agricultural and Rural Policy; Urban Development and Industrial Policy; Good Governance and the Rule of Law; National Security; Foreign Policy; Infrastructure; Education and Health. Despite these structures being in place, there were obstacles particularly from the ruling government that did not allow for an easy campaign period. For example, "on April 1, 2015, Yilkal Getnet (Eng.), president of the Blue Party (known in Amharic as Semayawi Party) had planned to travel to the United States for campaigning with the Ethiopian Diaspora there, according to Yonatan Tesfaye, public relations head of the party. However, his plan was aborted, because his passport was snatched by the authorities."

The censorship in Ethiopia makes it difficult for members of opposition parties to effectively campaign to the general Ethiopian populous, thus limiting knowledge of political candidates. Leaders of opposition parties have been arrested, including during the month after this election.

=== Number of candidates within each party ===
Political Parties Running for Election	Regional Assembly Candidates (Men)	Regional Assembly Candidates (Women)	House of Peoples' Representatives Candidates (Men)	House of Peoples' Representatives Candidates (Women)
Ethiopian People's Revolutionary Democratic Front	714	636	314	187
Ethiopia Federal Democratic Unity Forum	607	32	261	9
Blue Party	195	9	135	4
Ethiopian Democratic Party	154	18	159	6
Ethiopian Somali People's Democratic Party	196	77	10	14
Coalition for Unity and Democratic Party	103	16	93	15
All Ethiopian Democratic Organization	98	11	76	2
Unity for Democracy and Justice	82	13	89	3
Gambela People's Unity Democratic Movement	115	41	3	0
All Oromo People Democratic Party	65	5	40	9
New Generation Party	49	9	53	6
Benishangul-Gumuz People's Democratic Party	80	19	5	4
Ethiopian Raie Party	58	4	40	2
Afar National Democratic Party	77	16	6	2
Gumuz People's Democratic Movement	78	7	8	0
Ethiopian Democratic Unity Movement	33	5	33	6
Ethiopia Democratic Union	39	4	22	2
Ethiopian Justice and Democratic Forces Front	31	5	23	3
Sidama Hadicho People Democratic Organization	37	6	14	1
Oromo National Congress	31	0	20	3
Geda System Advancement Party	28	5	18	0
All Ethiopian National Movement	16	6	12	16
Agew Democratic Party	26	2	15	1
Ethiopian Peace and Democratic Party	13	7	10	6
Gedeo People Democratic Organization	21	0	7	0
Harari National League	10	8	1	0
Oromo Liberation Unity Front	9	0	5	0
Bench People Democratic Organization	9	0	3	0
Wolayta People Democratic Front	5	3	4	0
Independent Candidates	3	0	9	0
Welene People Democratic Party	3	0	7	0
Dilwabi Peoples' Democratic Movement	6	1	2	0
Donga People Democratic Organization	6	0	2	0
Denta Dubamo Kichinchila People's Democratic Organization	3	2	2	0
Kembata People's Congress	4	1	2	0
All-Amhara People's Organization	3	0	4	0
Ethiopian's Unity Democratic Organization	0	0	6	0
Somali Democratic Alliance Forces	5	0	-	-
Dube and Degeni Nationality Democratic Party	2	1	2	0
Argoba People Democratic Organization	3	0	1	0
Argoba Nationality Democratic Movement	3	0	1	0
Tigri Worgi Nationality Democratic Organization	-	-	3	0
Oromo Liberation Unity Front	-	-	3	0
Western Somali Democratic Party	2	0	-	-
All Ethiopian Democratic Party	-	-	2	0
Sodo Gordona Peoples' Democratic Organization	-	-	1	0
Ethiopian National Unity Party	-	-	1	0
Source: National Electoral Board

== Conduct ==
The elections were not free and fair; the government-controlled nationwide election board declared the Ethiopian People's Revolutionary Democratic Front, the authoritarian ruling party in Ethiopia for more than two decades, and its allies to have won every single seat. In 2016, the Electoral Integrity Project, a panel of scholars and experts on election integrity, noted that the election occurred amid "harassment of opposition parties, censorship of the media and repression of human rights"; it was ranked as the worst election on the Perceptions of Electoral Integrity (PEI) expert dataset. Human rights groups condemned the election as a sham; Human Rights Watch stated that the election was nondemocratic because, although there "may not have been widespread violence or blatant ballot box stuffing on Election Day," the government's "systematic repression of basic rights" made it "extremely unlikely that Ethiopians would feel safe" expressing opposition views. Jason Mosley, an associate fellow of the Africa program at Chatham House in London, writing ahead of the elections, described the election as an attempt by the ruling EPRDF to foster "controlled" or "non-competitive" political participation by the Ethiopian people; he added that the competitiveness of the opposition parties was undermined by both "internal divisions and bureaucratic obstacles."

Merga Bekana, the electoral board chairman at the time, declared the election to have been "free, fair, peaceful, credible and democratic" while the Ethiopian opposition, including Medrek coalition and the Semayawi (Blue) party, rejected the official declaration of results, citing the harassment and abuses that occurred. The Blue Party called the election an "undemocratic disgrace"—citing the government's refusal to register scores of its party members as candidates, as well as arrests of its candidates—and a signal that Ethiopia was a one-party state. Prime Minister Hailemariam Desalegn dismissed reports of abuses.

The United States Department of State said that the United States remained "deeply concerned by continued restrictions on civil society, media, opposition parties, and independent voices and views" in Ethiopia, and in July 2015, U.S. National Security Adviser Susan E. Rice stated that the election results were not credible. However, in July 2015, President Barack Obama visited Ethiopia and, at a joint press conference with Prime Minister Desalegn, referred to the government as "democratically elected"; while human rights groups had called for Obama to more forcefully press for democratic reforms, Obama instead made a more mild call for the Ethiopian government to become more open to opposition. Obama's approach was criticized by the Ethiopian opposition.

There were no international election observers from Western countries; the European Union (EU) declined to participate in the proceedings on the grounds that Ethiopia had ignored the recommendations it provided after the previous round of elections that were also won by a questionable landslide. The EU said that Ethiopia had not yet developed democratically and expressed concern over "arrests of journalists and opposition politicians, closure of a number of media outlets and obstacles faced by the opposition in conducting its campaign." The African Union (AU), which monitored the election, declared the election "calm, peaceful, and credible" (but not "free and fair"); the African Union Election Observation Mission did, however, note several irregularities.

== Results ==
=== House of Peoples' Representatives ===
The election found women gaining a more favorable percentage of seats, with men holding about 61% of the seats, and women holding about 39%.

Party	Votes	%	Seats	+/–
Ethiopian People's Revolutionary Democratic Front			500	+1
Ethiopian Somali People's Democratic Party			24	0
Benishangul-Gumuz People's Democratic Unity Front			9	0
Afar National Democratic Party			8	0
Gambela People's Democratic Movement			3	0
Argoba People's Democratic Organization			1	0
Hareri National League			1	0
Agew Democratic Party			0	–
All Ethiopian Democratic Organization			0	–
All Ethiopian Democratic Party			0	–
All Ethiopian National Movement			0	–
All Oromo People Democratic Party			0	–
All-Amhara People's Organization			0	–
Argoba Nationality Democratic Movement			0	–
Bench People Democratic Organization			0	–
Blue Party			0	–
Coalition for Unity and Democracy			0	–
Denta Dubamo Kichinchila People's Democratic Organization			0	–
Dilwabi Peoples' Democratic Movement			0	–
Donga People Democratic Organization			0	–
Dube and Degeni Nationality Democratic Party			0	–
Ethiopia Democratic Union			0	–
Ethiopian Democratic Party			0	–
Ethiopian Democratic Unity Movement			0	–
Ethiopian Justice and Democratic Forces Front			0	–
Ethiopian National Unity Party			0	–
Ethiopian Peace and Democratic Party			0	–
Ethiopian Raie Party			0	–
Ethiopian's Unity Democratic Organization			0	–
Geda System Advancement Party			0	–
Gedeo People Democratic Organization			0	–
Gumuz People's Democratic Movement			0	–
Kembata People's Congress			0	–
Medrek			0	–1
New Generation Party			0	–
Oromo Liberation Unity Front			0	–
Oromo People's Congress			0	–
Sidama Hadicho People Democratic Organization			0	–
Sodo Gordona Peoples' Democratic Organization			0	–
Tigri Worgi Nationality Democratic Organization			0	–
Unity for Democracy and Justice			0	–
Welene People Democratic Party			0	–
Wolayta People Democratic Front			0	–
Independents			0	–1
Undeclared			1	–
Total			547	0
Total votes	34,351,444	–		
Registered voters/turnout	36,851,461	93.22		
Source: IPU

=== Regional assemblies ===
Region	Party	Votes	%	Seats
Afar	Afar National Democratic Party	817,107		93
Afar	Argoba Nationality Democratic Organization	8,253		3
Amhara	Amhara National Democratic Movement	7,314,564		294
Benishangul-Gumuz	Benishangul Gumuz People's Democratic Party	222,790		99
Gambela	Gambela People's Democratic Movement	195,335		155
Harari	Hareri National League	84,097		18
Harari	Oromo Peoples' Democratic Organization	19,791		18
Oromia	Oromo Peoples' Democratic Organization	10,877,190		537
SNNP	Southern Ethiopian People's Democratic Movement	5,836,849		345
SNNP	Vacant	–	–	3
Somali	Somali People's Democratic Party	2,621,088		273
Tigray	Tigrayan People's Liberation Front	2,374,574		152
Source: National Electoral Board
