= Coalition of Ethiopian Federalist Forces =

Former political party in Ethiopia (2019–2020)

Coalition of Ethiopian Federalist Forces የኢትዮጵያ ፌዴራሊስት ኃይሎች ጥምረት
- Leader: Dereje Bekele
- Founded: 2019
- Dissolved: 2020
- Succeeded by: United Front of Ethiopian Federalist and Confederalist Forces
- Headquarters: Mekelle
- Ideology: Ethnic federalism Revolutionary democracy
- Political position: Left-wing
- Member parties: TPLF (before 2020); Teranafit

The Coalition of Ethiopian Federalist Forces (Amharic: የኢትዮጵያ ፌዴራሊስት ኃይሎች ጥምረት) was a coalition of Ethiopian political parties from 2019 to 2020 that included the Tigray People's Liberation Front (TPLF), the former ruling party that lost power in 2018.

== Background ==
In August 2019, the former dominant political party in Ethiopia, the Tigray People's Liberation Front (TPLF), that lost power in 2018, proposed creating a new ethno-federalist alliance. According to René Lefort and William Davison writing in Ethiopian Insight, the TPLF was likely to have difficulty creating an ethno-federalist alliance because it was "reviled from all parts of the Ethiopian political spectrum as the party that either created a despised ethnic federalism to divide-and-rule in its narrow ethnocentric interests, or the control-freaks that refused to allow true multinational federalism to breathe through its authoritarian blanket."

During 3–4 December 2019, the TPLF organised the second of two forums for "rescuing the constitution and multi-ethnic Federal System" in Mekelle. Borkena described the attendance as "not great". The coordinator of the forum, Mulugeta, stated that fifty national and ethnic-based parties and 700 prominent individuals attended the forum.

== Creation and Timeline ==
The Coalition of Ethiopian Federalist Forces was created in Mekelle. On 14 May 2020, when the general election scheduled for August 2020 was delayed by the federal government due to the COVID-19 pandemic, the Coalition held a meeting in Addis Ababa and stated that it supported the decision, while the TPLF opposed the decision.

On 25 June, at the Coalition's fourth meeting, in Addis Ababa, the Coalition decided to dismiss the TPLF and the Ethiopian Democratic Union if they missed any more meetings. Reasons cited for dismissing the two parties included: "dividing the members of the coalition and creating pressure"; "exploiting the coalition as a means to [destabilise] the country"; "missing meetings and insisting that meetings must take place in Mekelle"; and TPLF's decision to hold the 2020 Tigray regional election.

In November 2021 anti-government groups, including the Tigray People's Liberation Front (TPLF) and the Oromo Liberation Army (OLA), launched the UFEFCF in Washington, D.C., to coordinate military and political actions against the federal government.

In November 2022, the Pretoria Peace Agreement was signed, leading to the fragmentation of the formal UFEFCF coalition.

In following years, individual member groups pursue separate tracks; the OLA continues its insurgency, while the Amhara Fano militia breaks its alliance with the federal government and starts an independent conflict. Following a breakdown of the Pretoria agreement and renewed military clashes in Tigray, the TPLF and OLA re-engage in public discussions with regional armed factions—including Fano—to form a new multi-regional command structure.

== Structure ==
As of 25 June 2020, Dereje Bekele was the chair of the Coalition. The Coalition claims to be constituted of 24 political parties.

== Platforms, proposals ==
On 29 September 2020, a TPLF spokesperson proposed that a Coalition proposal posted on Facebook be used to continue a legal form of government following what the TPLF said was the end of the government's mandate on 5 October 2020. The Coalition's text proposed the "formation of an independent technocratic caretaker government the composition of which reflects the diversity of the Ethiopian people ... in line with the constitution and in consultation with all political stake holders and will be in charge until such time the peace and national salvation conference comes up with an agreed solution to the political and constitutional problems."
