= Oromo Federalist Democratic Movement =

Former political party in Ethiopia (2005–2012)

Oromo Federalist Democratic Movement Warraaqsa Federaalistii Uummata Oromoo
- Whip: Mesfin Nemera Deriesa
- Founder: Bulcha Demeksa
- Founded: 2005
- Dissolved: 2012
- Succeeded by: OPC
- Ideology: Oromo nationalism Federalism

The Oromo Federalist Democratic Movement Oromo: Warraaqsa Federaalistii Uummata Oromoo, OFDM) was a political party in Ethiopia, created in 2005 by Bulcha Demeksa to further the interests of the Oromo people as an alternative to the armed Oromo Liberation Front. In the 15 May 2005 federal election, the party won 11 seats, all from the Oromia Region. In March 2006, the party Whip was Mesfin Nemera Deriesa from the West Wallaga Zone. The OFDM merged with the Oromo People's Congress (OPC), forming the Oromo Federalist Congress (OFC), in 2012.

== Creation ==
The Oromo Federalist Democratic Movement was created as a non-armed political movement in early 2005 as an alternative to the armed Oromo Liberation Front (OLF) by Bulcha Demeksa. Bulcha described the refusal to use guns to obtain political change as the major and fundamental difference between the OFDM and the OLF, stating that the OFDM intended to work within the existing 1995 Constitution of Ethiopia, of which "many chapters" were acceptable to the OFDM. Bulcha stated that a consensus between Amharas, Oromos and Tigres would be needed for Ethiopia to have a "peaceful federal structure".

== 2005 regional election ==
In the August 2005 Regional assembly elections, the party won 10 out of 537 seats in the Oromia Region.

== 2008 ==
Bulcha Demeksa, announced in mid-April that his party would boycott the second round of voting in the 2008 Ethiopian local elections, joining a number of other opposition parties. Despite this, the OFDM picked up one seat in the 116 towns which held elections for their administrative councils.

In June 2008, the OFDM accused the Ethiopian government of ignoring the ethnic conflict in western Ethiopia which allegedly killed 400 Oromos. The OFDM called it a massacre and blamed the government as being at least "an accomplice."

At the beginning of July 2008, the OFDM joined forces with other Ethiopian opposition groups to form Medrek, formally known as the Forum for Democratic Dialogue. Other members of Medrek include the United Ethiopian Democratic Forces led by Beyene Petros, Arena Tigray (the Union of Tigrians for Democracy and Sovereignty, led by Gebru Asrat), former president Negasso Gidada, and former Minister of Defense Siye Abraha.

== 2009 ==
OFDM Secretary General Bekele Jirata was arrested 13 January 2009, along with at least 14 other ethnic Oromo for alleged ties to the outlawed Oromo Liberation Front and a previously unknown armed group, Kawerj, connections which were denied by the OFDM. He was released 4 February 2009 on bail. No date has been set for his trial.

Bekele Gerba joined OFDM in 2009, becoming a member of the executive committee and head of public relations.

== 2012 ==
The OFDM merged with the Oromo People's Congress (OPC), forming the Oromo Federalist Congress (OFC), in 2012.
