= Bekele Gerba =

Ethiopian politician and activist (born 1961)

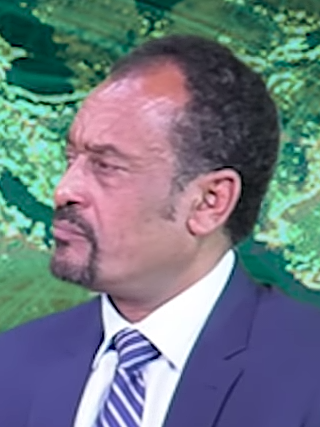
- Bekele in 2018
- Born: 1961 (age 64–65); Welega Province, Ethiopian Empire
- Occupations: Politician; political activist
- Political party: Oromo Federalist Congress
- Status: Released
- Convictions: Alleged connection with Oromo Liberation Front which was banned party (2011); Alleged connection with Oromo Liberation Front (2015); Inciting violence during Hachalu Hundessa riots (2020)

Details
- Date: 2011–2020

Bekele Gerba (born 1961) is an Ethiopian politician and activist. He is a member of Oromo Federalist Congress (OFC) which promotes political change by nonviolence. He was imprisoned from 2011 to 2015, 2015–2018 and again on 30 June 2020 following the Hachalu Hundessa riots.

Bekele and other imprisoned politicians started a hunger strike on 27 January 2021. The Federal High Court of Ethiopia ordered that he be taken to Landmark General Hospital, and repeated its order on 17 February. As of 17 February 2021, Bekele's medical condition was worsening.

== Childhood and education ==
Bekele Gerba was born in 1961 in West Welega Zone. He attended primary school in Boji Dirmaji and high school in Gimbi. He obtained a bachelor of arts in foreign language and literature at Addis Ababa University (AAU). As a postgraduate, he studied the teaching of English as a foreign language at AAU.

== Teaching ==
Bekele taught English and Oromo at Adama Teachers' College. In 2005 he was fired for "supporting [a] students' riot" in 2004. Bekele moved to Addis Ababa and continued teaching at private universities. In 2007 he was appointed as a lecturer in English by AAU.

== Politics and repression ==
In 2009, Bekele joined the Oromo Federalist Democratic Movement (OFDM), becoming a member of the executive committee and becoming head of OFDM's public relations team. He was an unsuccessful candidate in the 2010 Ethiopian general election.

=== Imprisonment: 2011 – April 2015 ===
On 27 August 2011, Bekele and Olbana Lelisa of Oromo People's Congress (OPC) were arrested on suspicion of being members of the Oromo Liberation Front (OLF). An Amnesty International delegation had met both Bekele and Olbana in the preceding days. After the arrests, the delegation was deported from Ethiopia. Amnesty International interpreted the arrests as being motivated by the men's meeting with the delegation. Bekele was sentenced to eight years' imprisonment. His sentence was reduced on appeal to three years, seven months. In 2012, while still in prison, Bekele became the First Deputy Chair of the Oromo Federalist Congress (OFC) that was formed from a merger of the OFDM and the OPC.

Bekele was released in April 2015. Bekele estimated that in the Ziway Prison where he spent part of his sentence, about 2000 of the prisoners were Oromo political prisoners.

=== Imprisonment: December 2015 – February 2018 ===
Bekele was detained again, together with 21 others, mostly senior OFC members, on 23 December 2015. Bekele was charged with linked with the OLF. During his imprisonment, Bekele and other OFC prisoners held a hunger strike to protest against the conditions in the prison.

Bekele was released on 13 February 2018, a day before journalist Eskinder Nega and Andualem Aragie of Ethiopian Citizens for Social Justice were released, and after a wave of 6000 releases of political prisoners in early 2018. Bekele stated that most of the prisoners remaining in Ziway Prison were political prisoners.

=== Imprisonment: June 2020 – January 2022 ===
Bekele Gerba was detained on 30 June 2020 together with Jawar Mohammed and 33 others following the 29 June Hachalu Hundessa riots. Senior federal police officers accused the detained of planning to assassinate government officials, after an Oromia Region special forces officer had been killed on 22 June. Bekele and Jawar were brought to court for a hearing on 2 July.

On 27 January 2021, Bekele, Jawar and other political prisoners started a hunger strike while still in prison. On 16 February 2021, the Ethiopian Federal High Court ordered Bekele and the other hunger strikers be treated at Landmark General Hospital. The prisoners were taken instead to the military Torhayloch Hospital, on the orders of "an unspecified higher official". At Torhayloch Hospital, Bekele refused to be treated, "fearing for his life". He was returned to the prison. On 17 February, Bekele's medical condition was worsening. The Federal High Court confirmed its order for Bekele to be taken to Landmark Hospital.

In Ethiopian Christmas of 7 January 2022, Bekele was released.

== Views ==
=== Ethnic conflict ===
Bekele Gerba said that he became aware of ethnic diversity when studying at university. His first unpleasant experiences with discrimination against Oromo during his period as a high school teacher. He described his motivation to enter politics as a reaction to discrimination, including unfair land transfers. His view of land transfers in 2015 was of a three-tier system, with TPLF members having freedom to obtain any land they wanted; regional government ministers having relative freedom to purchase or sell land with oversight by the TPLF; lower level administrators having similar powers for remaining land deal opportunities; civil servants who observe without power; and farmers whose land is "looted" by the higher level elites. Bekele argued that the pattern was similar in all parts of Ethiopia.

=== Oromia independence ===
In 2015, Bekele felt that Oromo independence was not a high priority and that it remained possible for injustices against the Oromo to be solved within the federal system.

=== Non-violence ===
Bekele stated in 2015 that he saw no role for armed struggle for the OFC, favouring the civil disobedience methods of Mahatma Gandhi and Martin Luther King. Human Rights Watch described Bekele as "deeply committed to nonoviolence". Earlier, during a court appearance for his 2011 arrest, Bekele stated,

I am honoured to learn that my non-violent struggles and humble sacrifices for the democratic and human rights of the Oromo people, to whom I was born without a wish on my part but due to the will of the Almighty, have been considered a crime and to be unjustly convicted.

— Bekele Gerba, in court proceedings, NPR

== See also ==
- Andualem Aragie
- Reeyot Alemu
- Eskinder Nega
- Daniel Bekele
- Arena Tigray
- Habtamu Ayalew
