= Gebru Asrat =

Ethiopian politician

- Born: Mekelle
- Citizenship: Ethiopia
- Occupation: Politician

Gebru Asrat is an Ethiopian politician, former president of Tigray Region (1991–2001), and one of the top leaders of the Tigray People's Liberation Front (TPLF) and the Ethiopian People's Revolutionary Democratic Front (EPRDF) until around 2000, when he founded a new party, Arena Tigray.

== Early life ==
Gebru was born in Mekelle, Ethiopia and attended Atse Yohannes High School and Haile Selassie I University during the early 1970s. He holds an undergraduate and graduate degree in economics.

== Career ==
After the TPLF defeated the Derg in the Ethiopian Civil War, Gebru became President of Tigray Region. Under Gebru a number of institutions of higher education, industries, hospitals and infrastructures were established in Tigray.

In May 1998, Eritrea started a border war which led to the death of tens of thousands of people on both sides. By the end of the war, the Ethiopian army recovered the town of Badme and drove back Eritrean forces until they controlled around one-third of Eritrean territory, including Barentu region.

Prime Minister Meles Zenawi signed a controversial UN peace treaty that was seen to have favored Eritrea. A faction led by Defense Minister Siye Abraha and Gebru Asrat disagreed with those aligned with Meles over "key issues of ideology", accused their supporters of corruption and Meles of failing to act quickly or decisively enough over the crisis with Eritrea. "Meles was certainly seen as a reluctant warrior," according to a source quoted by IRIN. The party was divided into two groups. One group, which included Gebru, Tewolde Wolde Mariam, Aregash, and Siye Abraha, believed that the leadership was bent on serving foreign "imperialist" interests. The other group which included Meles Zenawi argued that the TPLF was sinking into decadence, involving itself in Bonapartism.

Gebru left TPLF and EPRDF in the early 2000s after the division and went on to establish Arena Tigray, an alternative political party to TPLF in Tigray. Gebru became its chairman in 2007; Arena Tigray merged with other opposition parties in Ethiopia to form Medrek. Gebru ran unsuccessfully for the parliamentary seat representing the city of Mekelle in the 2010 parliamentary elections.
