= Asrat Woldeyes =

Ethiopian surgeon (1928–1999)

- Born: June 20, 1928; Addis Ababa
- Died: May 14, 1999 (aged 70); Philadelphia, Pennsylvania, USA
- Education: University of Edinburgh
- Occupations: Surgeon, professor
- Known for: Haile Selassie's personal physician Founder of All-Amhara People's Organization
- Political party: All-Amhara People's Organization

Asrat Woldeyes (Amharic: አስራት ወልደየስ; June 20, 1928 – May 14, 1999) was an Ethiopian surgeon, a professor of medicine at Addis Ababa University, and the founder and leader of the All-Amhara People's Organization (AAPO). He was jailed by the Derg and later by the Ethiopian People's Revolutionary Democratic Front (EPRDF). After his death, The Guardian described him as "successively Ethiopia's most distinguished surgeon, physician and university dean, most controversial political party leader and best known political prisoner".

== Medical work ==
Asrat studied medicine at the University of Edinburgh, becoming the first Ethiopian to qualify as a surgeon in the West. He then returned to Ethiopia, serving as Emperor Haile Selassie's personal physician until his 1975 death. He continued teaching and practicing medicine throughout the rule of President Mengistu Haile-Mariam.

== Political activism and imprisonment ==
When Meles Zenawi succeeded Mengistu in 1991, Asrat became an active critic of the government, particularly of Meles' formation of new autonomous regions in Ethiopia. He then formed his own political party, the AAPO, with a central tenet of restoring Ethiopian unity. The new Addis Ababa University administration led by Duri Mohammed dismissed Asrat in 1993. In 1994, he was sentenced to two years in prison for "planning violence against the state". International human rights organizations protested the evidence against him as unsound, and Amnesty International named him a prisoner of conscience. He was later convicted of more charges, extending his sentence by an additional three years. In 1996, Asrat faced a new trial which was repeatedly adjourned, keeping him in prison indefinitely.

== Illness and death ==
In 1998, Asrat, who had previously had bypass surgery, developed further heart problems, and government doctors stated that he needed treatment overseas to survive. However, the Ethiopian government initially denied him permission to travel, triggering international appeals on his behalf. On December 25, 1998, authorities yielded to international pressure, granting him a compassionate release and allowing him treatment in Houston. Though his treatment was at first successful, Asrat died five months later of his heart ailment at the University of Pennsylvania hospital in Philadelphia.
