= Bulcha Demeksa =

Ethiopian politician and businessman (1930–2025)

Leader of the Oromo Federalist Democratic Movement
- In office 2005–2012

Member of Oromo Federalist Congress
- In office 2012 – 5 January 2025
- Constituency: Mirab (West) Welega

Member of the House of Peoples' Representatives for Mirab (West) Welega
- In office 2005–2010

Member of Parliament for OFDM

Personal details
- Born: 9 July 1930 Bodji, Wollega, Ethiopian Empire
- Died: 6 January 2025 (aged 94) Addis Ababa, Ethiopia
- Party: OFC
- Other political affiliations: OFDM
- Profession: Politician, businessman

Bulcha Demeksa (9 July 1930 – 6 January 2025) was an Ethiopian politician and businessman. He was the founder of the Oromo Federalist Democratic Movement (OFDM), one of Ethiopia's largest opposition parties.

== Life and career ==
Demeksa was born in Bodji, Wollega, Ethiopian Empire on 9 July 1930. In 1967, Demeksa was appointed vice-minister of Finance before representing his country at the board of the World Bank. In 1974, when the Ethiopian Revolution started, he left Ethiopia and was hired by the UN administration. Demeksa took his retirement in Ethiopia in 1991. In 1994, he created the Awash International Bank, which became a success.

In early 2005, Demeksa founded the Oromo Federalist Democratic Movement (OFDM), which he saw as a non-military, democratic political party as an alternative to the armed Oromo Liberation Front.

Demeksa has been one of the most outspoken opponents of the late Meles Zenawi's government and the opposition leader most referred to by the international media. With other opposition officials, he helped with the creation of Medrek, a larger opposition alliance.

Demeksa resigned as OFDM party chairman in late 2010 but continued as an adviser for the leadership. His retirement from OFDM and his harsh criticism of Prime Minister Meles Zenawi and of the 2010 elections were a regular feature story on dozens of private Amharic and English newspapers in the country. In 2019 he announced his intention to run in the 2020 elections.

Demeksa died in Addis Ababa on 6 January 2025, at the age of 94.

== Awards ==
At the end of 2008, Demeksa was named "Person of the Year" by Jimma Times, the online version of the defunct Afan Oromo private Yeroo newspaper. He was chosen for his work in the financial sector and his work for human rights and democracy as well as a peace activist between different warring sections of the Ethiopian society.
