= 2008 Ethiopian local elections =

Ethiopia held nationwide elections for local offices in the kebele and woreda assemblies on 13 and 20 April 2008. By-elections were also held for seats in the Addis Ababa City Council, and in the national and regional parliaments that were vacant due to the Coalition for Unity and Democracy's (CUD) refusal to participate at the same time. By law, the local elections were supposed to be held as part of the 2005 general elections, but due to the resulting unrest they were postponed.

== Background ==
This election was important for the victors would control the local government structures, the kebeles and woredas, which are the key institutions for controlling local communities and are the main service providers. "For members of the local councils," writes Aalen and Tronvoll, "re-election is a matter of keeping their daily bread; and for new candidates, membership in one of the councils is viewed as a way of getting access to scarce state resources."

While the international community was a significant player in the 2005 elections, in this election they were on the sidelines. In a letter sent to a group of nations providing foreign aid to Ethiopia, of 26 December 2007, three party leaders -- Beyene Petros (United Ethiopian Democratic Forces), Temesken Zewdie (CUD), and Bulcha Demeksa (Oromo Federalist Democratic Movement) -- desperately pleaded for their intervention: "We are drawing your attention to this critical matter of election observing because we are afraid that the manner in which the NEB is currently running the process leading up to the elections is predictably a way to a non-consensual election outcome." Possible pressure by donor countries on the Ethiopian government was neutralized by the desire to fulfill the Millennium Development Goals, a fact which the government knows well. When a group of donor countries tried to play hard-ball with Prime Minister Meles Zenawi and suspended money payments in the aftermath of the 2005 election, he calmly told them to pack up and go home if they were not interested in supporting the development of the country. "After a few weeks," notes Aalen and Tronvoll, "all donor countries caved in and resumed full development assistance to the country."

== Results ==
The ruling party, the Ethiopian People's Revolutionary Democratic Front (EPRDF), regained control of the Addis Ababa city council, and won all but one of the 39 parliamentary by-elections. In local elections, the EPRDF won more than 3.5 million of the 3.6 million open seats. The National Elections Board of Ethiopia reported the turnout was 93% of eligible voters.

Although this was the first election in Ethiopia since the tumultuous 2005 general election, several opposition parties sat out the election. Bulcha Demeksa, said his party had only been able to put forward 2% of the 6,000 candidates it wanted to because they had been threatened by government supporters. Likewise, another opposition party, the United Ethiopian Democratic Forces said that of its 20,000 candidates who attempted to register, only 10,000 succeeded, and only 6,000 of those actually had their names placed on the lists at polling stations.
