= Murad Abdulhadi =

Ethiopian politician (born 1971)

President of Harari Region
- In office 3 October 2005 – November 2018
- Preceded by: Fuad Ibrahim
- Succeeded by: Ordin Bedri

Personal details
- Born: Murad Abdulhadi; 19 May 1971 Harar, Ethiopia
- Party: Harari National League
- Education: Addis Ababa University (BSc); Open University (MBA)

Murad Abdulhadi Sherif is an Ethiopian politician. He served as the president of the Harari Region between 2005 and 2018, rendering him Ethiopia's most tenured regional leader. He was also head of Harari National League, a political party.

== Early life ==
Murad was born to Harari farmers in the city of Harar near Argobari in 1971. Maternally he is a descendant of the prominent Kabir households. He has a BSc in geology at Addis Ababa University and an MBA from Open University in the United Kingdom.

== Career ==
He held the role of executive committee member in the Harari National League prior to becoming its leader in 2005. In 2006 the city of Harar was selected as a World Heritage Site with Murad keen on committing to transform the city into a tourist spectacle. As president of the Harari Region, Murad visited Harar's twin city Charleville-Mézières in 2009.

He resigned in 2018 and was succeeded by Ordin Bedri.
