= United Ethiopian Democratic Forces =

Former political coalition in Ethiopia (2005–2008)

United Ethiopian Democratic Forces የኢትዮጵያ ዴሞክራሲዊ ኃይሎቸ ሕብረት
- Founded: 2005
- Dissolved: July 2008
- Headquarters: Addis Ababa
- Membership (2005): 2.9 million
- Ideology: Social democracy Social liberalism
- Political position: Big tent

Website
- www.hebret.org

The United Ethiopian Democratic Forces (Amharic: የኢትዮጵያ ዴሞክራሲዊ ኃይሎቸ ሕብረት) was a coalition of several political parties in Ethiopia which combined to compete for seats in the Ethiopian general elections held on 15 May 2005.

The main constituent parties were the Oromo National Congress, Ethiopian Social Democratic Federal Party, Southern Ethiopia People's Democratic Coalition and the Ethiopian Democratic Unity Party. Other parties that joined to create the UEDF include: Afar Revolutionary Democratic Unity Front), All-Ethiopia Socialist Movement (MEISON), Ethiopian Democratic Union - Tehadiso, Ethiopian National United Front, Ethiopian People Federal Democratic Unity Party (HIBREHIZB), Ethiopian People's Revolutionary Party, Gambela People's United Democratic Front, Oromo People's Liberation Organization (OPLO - IBSO), and Tigrean Alliance for Democracy.

In July 2008, the UEDF joined the Oromo Federalist Democratic Movement, the Somali Democratic Alliance Forces, and the Union of Tigrians for Democracy and Sovereignty (also known as Arena) to found the Ethiopian Democratic Unity Front or simply Medrek, a new coalition of opposition parties and activists.

== 2005 election results ==
In the 2005 parliamentary elections held on 15 May 2005, the UEDF gained 52 seats in the Council of People's Representatives (CFR), consisting of 40 from the Oromia and 12 from the Southern Nations, Nationalities, and Peoples Region (SNNPR).

In the August 2005 Regional assembly elections, the party won 105 out of 537 seats in the assembly of the Oromia Region, 1 of the 36 seats in the Harari Region, and 37 of the 348 seats in the assembly of the SNNPR.

In October the UEDF briefly supported the other major opposition party, the Coalition for Unity and Democracy, in a refusal to participate in the CPR until several demands were met. However, at the last moment, party chairman Dr. Merera Gudina and vice-chair Beyene Petros both announced the UEDF would participate, after which a vote of the party's central committee on 24 October 2005 expelled both of them. The current acting party leaders are vice chairman Girma Shumie and Secretary-General Dereje Kebede, and the party Whip is Geberu Mariam Uturu, who represents a district in the West Shewa Zone of Oromia.

== 2008 by-election results ==
Accusing the ruling Ethiopian People's Revolutionary Democratic Front of using intimidation to force 14,000 of its candidates for local seats in the 15 May 2008 by-elections, three days before that election Beyenne Petros announced that the UEDF would boycott the election.

== See also ==
- Ethiopian Democratic Party
- Ethiopian Democratic Union
