= EPRDF Youth League =

Youth league in Ethiopia (2009–2019)

- Founded: May 2009
- Dissolved: 1 December 2019
- Headquarters: Addis Ababa
- Membership: 1,250,445
- Mother party: Ethiopian People's Revolutionary Democratic Front
- Website: http://www.eprdf.org.et/web/youth/home

The EPRDF Youth League (Amharic: የኢህአዴግ ወጣቶች ሊግ) was the youth wing of the Ethiopian People's Revolutionary Democratic Front (EPRDF). The organization was established in May 2009. The EPRDF was organized under the four member organizations of EPRDF and two administrative councils. EPRDF was dissolved on 1 December 2019 and succeeded by the Prosperity Party.
