= Duri Mohammed =

Ethiopian government official

- Born: 15 July 1936; Harar, Hararghe Province, Ethiopian Empire
- Died: 24 April 2015 (aged 79)
- Political party: Harari National League

Academic background
- Education: University College of Addis Ababa; University of California, Berkeley; University of Reading

Academic work
- Discipline: Economics
- Sub-discipline: Philosophy
- Institutions: Addis Ababa University

Duri Mohammed (1936–2015) was an Ethiopian government official. He served as Permanent Representative to the United Nations and was Vice President of the United Nations General Assembly in the 1990s. Duri is also known for co-founding the Harari National League.

== Early life ==
Duri Mohammed was born in Harar in 1936. He earned his BA in 1959 from what was called University College of Addis Ababa, now Addis Ababa University. From there, he was sent to earn an MA in economics from University of California, Berkeley (1962). He completed his doctorate at the University of Reading in the UK (1972).

== Career ==
Duri was president of Addis Ababa University (1977–1985) and (1993–1995). During his first tenure at AAU the academy was preserved and even saw its resurgence despite the turbulent times amid the Ethiopian inserruction. Upon Duri's controversial appointment as president of Addis Ababa University in 1993 by the new government of Ethiopia, 42 staff members were fired including Asrat Woldeyes and former president Alemayehu Teferra. Following the massive sackings, the President of Ethiopia at the time Meles Zenawi stated as director, Duri was at liberty to oversee the institution at his discretion.

He served as Minister for Planning and Economic Development under the Meles Zenawi administration, as well as Ethiopian ambassador to the United Nations from 1996–2001. In 1998 he also briefly served as Vice President of the United Nations General Assembly.
