= Gambela People's Democratic Movement =

Former political party in Ethiopia (2003–2019)

- Founded: 2003
- Dissolved: 1 December 2019
- Preceded by: GPLM; GPDF
- Merged into: Prosperity Party

The Gambela Peoples’ Democratic Movement (GPDM, Amharic: የጋምቤላ ሕዝቦች ዴሞክራሲያዊ ንቅናቄ, romanized: Yä-Gambella Həzbočč Demokrasiyawi Nəqnaqe), also known as the Gambela People’s Democratic Movement or Gambella Peoples’ Unity Democratic Movement (Amharic: ጋምቤላ ሕዝቦች አንድነት ዴሞክራሲያዊ ንቅናቄ, romanized: Gambälla Həzbočč Andinet Demokrasiyawi Nəqnaqe, GPUDM), was a political party in the Gambela Region of Ethiopia. It was the regional ally of the ruling EPRDF coalition.

The GPDM was founded as the new regional EPRDF ally in 2003. Its predecessors were the Gambela People's Liberation Movement (GPLM), which was in existence 1991–1998, and the Gambela People’s Democratic Front (GPDF), in existence 1998–2003.

== History ==
=== Predecessors ===
The GPLM was founded in 1979 and was based in the Anuak ethnic group. This group launched a guerrilla war against both the Derg regime of Ethiopia and the Sudan People's Liberation Army (SPLA). The latter had a major base in Gambela and had committed numerous atrocities against the local inhabitants; however the GPLM was unable to mobilize more than a negligible portion of the population and never held any liberated area before the fall of the Derg in 1991. With the end of the Ethiopian Civil War, Ethiopian People's Revolutionary Democratic Front (EPRDF) forces, accompanied by a small contingent of the GPLM, occupied Gambela and expelled the SPLA. Now in power, the GPLM removed the predominantly Nuer leadership that had dominated the province under the Derg, as well as settling old scores with its ethnic rival. In response, the Nuer organized the Gambela People's Democratic Unity Party (GPDUP), which was immediately recognised by the EPRDF.

Despite the GPLM's hold on power it was weakened by internal disputes, predominantly between Anuak from villages along the Upeno (or Baro River), who known as "the Upeno boys", and those from villages along the Gilo River. The first group, including Regional President Okello Ouman, were expelled from the GPLM before the 1995 General Election. In response to this situation, the EPRDF ordered the remaining members of the GPLM and the GPDUP to merge into the GPDF in 1998.

=== Formation of the GPDM ===
This led dissatisfied Anuak to found the Gambella People’s Democratic Congress. Prior to the 2000 elections, many leaders of this opposition party were detained. In 2003, the central government dissolved the GPDF and replaced it with the GPDM, a coalition of three newly founded ethnic-based parties. The three constituent parties were the Nuer People’s Democratic Organization for the Nuer and Opo, the Anyua People’s Democratic Organization for the Anuak and Komo, and the Majanger People’s Democratic Organization for the Majangir.

=== Election results ===
At the last legislative elections, 23 May 2010, the party won all the 3 seats from Gambela. In the 2010 Regional assembly elections held on the same day, the party won all 156 seats in the Gambela legislature. As of 2010, Omod Ubong, president of the regional government of Gambela, is the GPDM's chairman.

At the previous legislative elections, 15 May 2005, the party won all the 3 seats from Gambela. The Deputy Chairman of the legislature's Social Affairs Committee is a member of the GPDM. In the August 2005 Regional assembly elections, the party won 81 out of 82 seats in Gambela.

In December 2019, the party joined with the Afar National Democratic Party (ANDP), the Amhara Democratic Party (ADP), the Benishangul-Gumuz People's Democratic Unity Front (BGPDUF), the Somali Democratic Party (SDP), the Hareri National League (HNL), the Oromo Democratic Party (ODP) and the Southern Ethiopian People's Democratic Movement (SEPDM) to form the Prosperity Party.
