= Argoba Nationality Democratic Organization =

Former political party in Ethiopia

Argoba National Democratic Organization
- Dissolved: c. 2010
- Merged into: APDO
- Ideology: Minority politics
- House of Peoples' Representatives (2005): 1 / 547
- Special woreda (2008): 65 / 260

The Argoba National Democratic Organization (ANDO; Amharic: የአርጎባ ሕዝቦች ዴሞክራሲዊ ንቅናቄ) was a political party in Ethiopia. At the last legislative elections on 15 May 2005, the party elected Amine Endiris Ebrahim to represent a district in the Semien Shewa Zone of the Amhara Region.

In local elections, the ANDO won two seats in the Afar Regional assembly in the 2000 and again in the 2005 local elections. In the 2008 by-elections, the ANDO won all 65 seats (and control) of the Argobba special woreda, and 260 seats and control of 13 kebeles in that woreda.
