= Berhanu Kebede =

Ethiopian diplomat (born 1966)

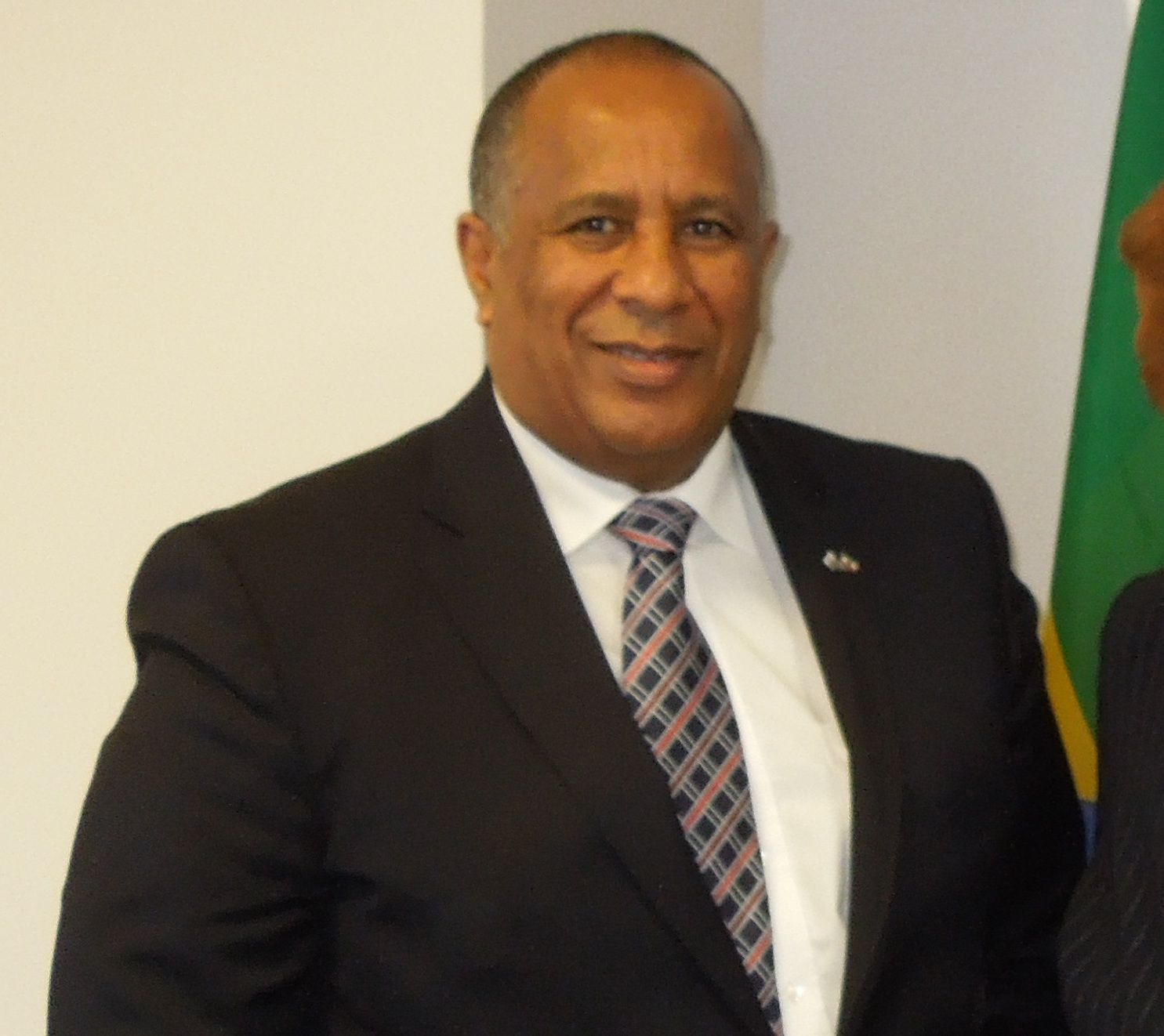
Kebede in November 2012

Berhanu Kebede (born 11 April 1956) is an Ethiopian diplomat who is the current chief of staff at RJMEC – Reconstituted Joint Monitoring and Evaluation Commission for the Agreement on the Resolution of the Conflict in the Republic of South Sudan.

== Early life and education ==
Berhanu Kebede was born in Addis Ababa. He graduated in 1978 with a degree in economics from Addis Ababa University and continued his studies at the Free University of Brussels, earning M.A. degrees in Development Economics (1986) and in Management and Finance (1988).

== Career ==
He joined the Ethiopian Ministry of Foreign Affairs in 1978, serving as Ethiopia/EEC Relations Desk Officer. In 1983 he was mandated to the Diplomatic Mission in Brussels, with the title of economist. Berhanu participated in negotiations leading to the 1981 and 1985 extensions of the Lomé Convention – an agreement concerning international aid and trade between the African, Caribbean and Pacific countries and the European Union – as well as participating in the committees that managed this convention.

In 1992 Berhanu returned to Addis Ababa to lead the Western European Division at the Ministry at the rank of Counselor, before taking on the role of Acting Director General for International Organisation and Economic Cooperation in 1993. Later that year he was promoted to Director General, and it was in this role that he represented Ethiopia at all of the Organisation of African Unity Council and Summit conferences held between 1992 and 2000, as well as the Economic Commission for Africa Ministerial Conferences held in this period, chaired the Economic and Social Council meeting of the African Economic Community in June 1998, and served as deputy leader of the Ethiopian delegation to the United Nations from 1993 to 2000.

On 7 December 2000, he was appointed the Ethiopian ambassador to Russia. In February 2002, he was appointed Ambassador of Ethiopia to Sweden and concurrently Norway, Denmark, Finland and Iceland. In March 2006 he was appointed as Ambassador of Ethiopia to the United Kingdom, a position he held during 10 years.

In 2016, H.E. Berhanu Kebede has been appointed chief of staff at JMEC – Joint Monitoring and Evaluation Commission for the Agreement on the Resolution of the Conflict in the Republic of South Sudan.

Berhanu speaks Amharic, English and French. He is married with three children.
