= Boji Dirmaji =

Administrative division of Ethiopia

Boji Dirmaji (Boojjii Dirmajjii in Afaan Oromo) is one of the woredas in the Oromia of Ethiopia. It is part of the West Welega Zone. It is bounded by Benishangul Gumuz Regional state in the north, Nejo in the west, Boji Chokorsa in the south and Lalo Asabi in the southeast. Its administrative town is called Bila. For the first time in Oromo history the gospel was proclaimed in Boji Dirmaji, at a place called Boji karkaro in 1898.

== Demographics ==
The 2007 national census reported a total population for this woreda of 42,813 in 8,536 households, of whom 20,943 were men and 21,870 were women; 7,291 or 17.03% of its population were urban dwellers. The majority of the inhabitants observed Protestantism, with 90.57% reporting that as their religion, while 6.59% observed Ethiopian Orthodox Christianity.
