= All Ethiopian National Movement =

Political party in Ethiopia

All Ethiopian National Movement የመላው ኢትዮጵያውያን ብሔራዊ ንቅናቄ
- Chairman: Mesfin Shiferraw
- Registered: 3 June 2005
- Headquarters: Addis Ababa

The All Ethiopian National Movement (Amharic: የመላው ኢትዮጵያውያን ብሔራዊ ንቅናቄ, romanized: yemelawi ītiyop’iyawiyani biḥērawī nik’inak’ē, abbreviated መኢብን, 'Meiben') is a political party in Ethiopia. Mesfin Shiferraw is the chairman of the party. The party was registered on 3 June 2005. The election symbol of the party is three fingers.
