= Oromo Federalist Congress =

Political party in Ethiopia

- Leader: Merera Gudina; Bekele Gerba
- Chairperson: Merera Gudina
- Founded: July 2012
- Preceded by: OFDM; OPC
- Headquarters: Addis Ababa
- Youth wing: Oromo Youth League
- Ideology: Oromo nationalism; Anti-centrism
- House of Peoples' Representatives: 11 / 547

Party flag

Website
- oromofederalist.com/party-ideology-and-history/

The Oromo Federalist Congress, (OFC) (Oromo: Koongiresii Federalawaa Oromoo, KFO), is a political party based in Ethiopia that was created in 2012 from the merger of the Oromo Federalist Democratic Movement and Oromo People's Congress.

== Creation ==
In July 2012, Oromo Federalist Democratic Movement and Oromo People's Congress merged, creating the Oromo Federalist Congress.

== Leadership ==
Senior leaders of OFC in early 2020 included Merera Gudina and Bekele Gerba, both who had spent long periods as prisoners. Merera was chair, Bekele was deputy chair, and Desta Dinka was Youth League chair.

Jawar Mohammed became a member of OFC on 28 December 2019.

== Electoral strategies ==
In preparation for the 2021 Ethiopian general election, that had been constitutionally scheduled for May 2020, OFC agreed to form an electoral coalition with Oromo Liberation Front (OLF) and Oromo Nationalist Party (ONP) led by Kemal Gelchu.

== Policies ==
=== Tigray War ===
On 25 November 2021 during the TDF–OLA joint offensive of the Tigray War, OFC called for an inclusive transitional government to be created. OFC described the situation as "an avoidable war ... raging all over the country[,] consuming the lives of tens of thousands and bringing misery for tens of millions ... not limited to armed factions, but also [including] ordinary citizens with no real training for war or [who] have no knowledge of international rules of engagements in war [and who became] active actors of the horror." The OFC's proposal included an immediate ceasefire, the release of all political prisoners, and "a total repudiation of all incitements to violence and hate speech in all forms". The OFC called for the immediate creation of a 3–6 month interim government headed by a mutually accepted person, and the main goal of the interim government being to create an "all-inclusive transitional government that shall last for 18 months", followed by "free, fair and credible elections".
