= Oromo nationalism =

Ethnic nationalism

Flag of the Oromo Liberation Front

Oromo nationalism (Oromo: Oromummaa) is an ethnic nationalism advocating the self-interest of Oromo people in Ethiopia and Kenya. Many Oromo elites, intellectuals and political leaders struggled to create an independent Oromia state throughout 19th and 20th century, since the start of Abyssinian colonialism under Emperor Menelik II. No consensus has been reached yet regarding the motives of this type of nationalism, whether the Oromos liberate themselves to form a nation-state or offer self-determination in federal Ethiopia.

Oromo nationalism is viewed as opposite of the Ethiopian nationalism like other forms of ethnic nationalism, which support civic nationalism and pan-Ethiopianism. It is also accused of fomenting various conflicts within Ethiopia and increasing anti-Amhara sentiments.

== Concept ==
The rise of Oromo nationalism began following resistance against the conqueror Abyssinian force under Emperor Menelik II in the late 19th century, when many Oromo intellectuals and revolutionaries tried to struggle for centralized leadership. Oromo nationalism posited the opposite of Ethiopian nationalism, by claiming the Ethiopians considered people neither civilization nor history. Oromo is the largest ethnic group in Ethiopia comprising about 40% of Ethiopia's population. Historically, they were called "galla" in various Ethiopian literature and beginning to Oromo migrations, the Oromo civilization strived to the Ethiopian dominance, by introducing adoption system (guddifachaa) the democratic rule (the gadaa system).

Oromo nationalism is viewed as a recent phenomenon and has been a controversial subject among the Oromo elites. This fluctuates between Oromo self-determination and the creation of an independent Oromia state within the federal law of Ethiopia. The Oromo elites and nationalists always perceive the Oromo people as "oppressed people" by Ethiopian colonial rule, they suggested in their thesis that Oromia and Ethiopia are mutually exclusive, believing one should be destroyed while the other grows. Gemechu Megersa said that "There is only one big problem for Ethiopia and that is Oromia, and there is one big problem for Oromia and that is Ethiopia".

== History ==
During the Italian invasion of Ethiopia, the Oromo nobility sided with Italy hoping to exercise their power and taking advantage to return their lands. The Italian appointed them as governors of their former lands. In 1935, Raya Azeboos Oromos attacked the Abyssinian armies during the Battle of Maychew. Also, in 1936, Oromos in Jimma expelled Amharas officials to defy the colonial rule. Hence, the Oromo nobility in western Ethiopia declared an independent Oromia state called Western Oromo Confederation (WOC), expressing a mandatory state to the League of Nations. After the end of Italian rule in 1941 and Emperor Haile Selassie return, the Oromos broadly contested the Abyssinian rule and started rebellion against the Shewa Amharan nobility. However, such events were not mentioned in the Ethiopian historiography.

In 1973, the Oromo nationalist founded the Oromo Liberation Front (OLF) and its wing, the Oromo Liberation Army (OLA) in order to counter oppression during Haile Selassie's rule. During the Derg rule, OLF had fought against the Derg administration to create Oromia state. Although OLF marginalized with other rebel group such as Islamic Front for the Liberation of Oromia (IFLO) and the Oromo People's Liberation Front (OPLF), they were able organizing into smaller units like clans and villages. The Oromo resistance continued through the end of Ethiopian Civil War and the rise of EPRDF government in 1991. They sometimes coordinated with but rebelled against the EPRDF to gain autonomy. For instance, the OLF fought small guerella war in the southern Ethiopian region in order to liberate Oromo ethnicity in that area from the central government, while IFLO and OPDO resorted to the government alliance. This resulted in an intragroup conflict between those factions, notably the OLF and IFLO. In July 2000, both groups reached a peace agreement, but this could not allevate the clashes thereafter, most notably between members of OPDO and Oromo Federalist Democratic Movement (OFDM), and numerous Oromo political organizations. The Oromos took small demonstrations to show their representation in all Ethiopian universities. The Tigrayan-dominated government perceived the Oromos as the major threat to their power and persecuted them in various occasions.

Since Abiy Ahmed took power in 2018, many radical Oromo reactionaries attacked him for his working as "neftenya agent" and eroding Oromia constituency. Politicians like Jawar Mohammed stated that only EPRDF could save Ethiopia from disintegration because it exercising a strong military, police and bureaucracy structure. He argued opposition groups had no wielding power during the transition. On other hands, activist Eskinder Negga and Bekele Gerba have another outlook. Eskinder, a pan-Ethiopianist, supported a transition government, though Bekele would prefer transitional administration led by Lemma Megesa.

== Oromummaa ==
Oromumma is an Oromo nationalist and ethnocenteric term. It is thought to define the Oromo integrity, and cultural expression.
