= Siye Abraha =

Ethiopian politician

Siye Abraha Hagos
- ስዬ አብርሃ ሓጐስ

Executive Member of Unity for Democracy and Justice
- In office 2008–2011

Chief executive officer of Endowment Fund for the Rehabilitation of Tigray
- In office 1995–2002

Minister of Defense
- In office 1991–1995
- President: Meles Zenawi
- Prime Minister: Tamrat Layne
- Preceded by: Tesfaye Gebre Kidan
- Succeeded by: Tamrat Layne

Personal details
- Born: 12 June 1955 (age 71) Tembien, Tigray province, Ethiopian Empire
- Party: Independent
- Other political affiliations: Unity for Democracy and Justice (2008–2011); Ethiopian People's Revolutionary Democratic Front (1988–2002); Tigray People's Liberation Front (1974–2002)
- Education: Harvard University (MA); Open University (MBA); Addis Ababa University
- Occupation: Politician

Siye Abraha Hagos (also Seeye Abraha Hagos) (Tigrinya: ስዬ አብርሃ ሓጐስ, siyә abräha; born 12 June 1955) is an Ethiopian politician who served as Ethiopian Minister of Defense from 1991 to 1995. He was a top official of Tigray People's Liberation Front (TPLF) and Ethiopian People's Revolutionary Democratic Front executive committees until 2002. Since 2013, he has been working as Security Sector Reform Advisor for United Nations Development Programme in Liberia.

== Personal life and education ==
Siye Abraha was born in the village of Addeha in Tembien, Tigray Province, Ethiopian Empire. He attended elementary school in Tigray and then General Wingate Secondary School in Addis Ababa. He then attended Addis Ababa University as medical student where he was active in the student movement but left his university study after his first year to join TPLF for armed struggle.

He received a Master of Arts degree in Public Administration from Harvard University in 2012, and a Master of Business Administration degree from the Open University in 1995. He is married to a former Tigray People's Liberation Front rebel fighter and they have one daughter and two sons together.

== Political career ==
=== Before 1991 ===
While at Addis Ababa University the young Siye participated in student moment and later drop out to join TPLF in the mid 1970s. After joining TPLF as a rebel fighter he rose to the high rank of the party and become a commander of the TPLF force in a short time. His prominence in the TPLF has led the Derg authorities to take revenge against his family. Among others, his elder brother was taken out from Atse Yohannes High School in Mekelle, where he was a physics teacher, and shot dead in front of his students.

=== After 1991 ===
==== Minister of Defense (1991-1995) ====
After the defeat of the Derg and the end of Ethiopian Civil War in 1991, Siye served as the Ethiopian Minister of Defense. In his capacity as Minister of Defense and Legislator he negotiated with all other armed rebel groups to their cessation of armed struggle and joining of the Transitional Government. Besides restructuring the Ministry of Defense into a nimble and effective institution and laying the foundations for a new national defense force, Seeye oversaw the implementation of a DDR program affecting over half a million ex-servicemen and ex-combatants. He also had a key role during the 1998-2000 Ethio-Eritrean War both in reversing the Aggression of the other side and in the design of the conditions for the deployment UN Peace Keeping Forces.

==== CEO of Endowment Fund for the Rehabilitation of Tigray (1995-2002) ====
Siye was Chairman of the Board and Chief Executive Officer of the Endowment Fund for the Rehabilitation of Tigray from its founding in 1995 until 2000. He had also played significant role in the introduction of the economic rehabilitation and restructuring policies following the end of the war in the early nineties. As part of the restructuring process he served as board chairman of both Ethiopian Airlines and Ethiopian Telecommunications and led their establishment as autonomous corporate entities. He also was involved in the running of a big Endowment Fund which was involved in diverse development activities.

== Controversy and imprisonment ==
Siye was arrested in July 2002, accused by the Federal Ethics and Anticorruption Commission of abuse of office by aiding his associates to unfairly obtain bank loans and buying state properties. He was afterwards charged with two specific acts: that he had pressured the state-owned Commercial Bank of Ethiopia to provide loans to his brother, Mihretab Abraha; and that he helped Mihretab obtain a 19% discount for 15 trucks he purchased from AMCE, a truck-assembly plant in which the Ethiopian government owned a 30% stake. In a hearing, the Federal judge, Birtukan Mideksa, set Siye free for lack of evidence, however he was subsequently arrested by the government the moment he left the building and imprisoned for six years.

On June 11, 2007, the Federal Supreme Court of Ethiopia dismissed the charge that he had pressured the bank to give his brother loans, while convicting him on the charge that he helped his brother Mihretab get discounts on seven of the 15 trucks. At the same session, Mihretab was sentenced to five years imprisonment and a 1,000 Birr fine, along with a number of their friends and relatives who heard their sentences at the same time. However, because most of them had been imprisoned they were released.

== After release ==
In July 2008, Siye became a founding member of the Forum for Democratic Dialogue (FDD), a new coalition of opposition parties and activists. Since then he, along with ex-President Negasso Gidada, another former member of the EPRDF, have announced that they have joined the Unity for Democracy and Justice Party, a coalition of which the FDD is a member. However, in late 2010 Unity for Democracy and Justice Party was dissolved due to government pressure and imprisonment of top officials of the party.

From 2011 to 2012, Siye Abraha was a fellow in the Mason Program at Harvard Kennedy School (USA). He graduated in mid 2012 and joined United Nations Development Programme.

== United Nations Development Programme ==
In 2013, Siye was appointed as Security Sector Reform Advisor by UNDP. He has been working as Security Sector Reform Advisor in Liberia.
