= Pretoria peace agreement =

Pretoria peace agreement may refer to:

- Pretoria Convention (1880–1881): treaty that ended the First Boer War
- Treaty of Vereeniging (1902): signed in Pretoria; ended the Second Boer War
- Pretoria Accord (2002): agreement that aimed to end the Second Congo War
- Pretoria Agreement (2005): treaty to end the First Ivorian Civil War
- Ethiopia–Tigray peace agreement (2022): signed in Pretoria; treaty to end the Tigray War
