= Merera Gudina =

Ethiopian politician

Merera Gudina Mararaa Guddinaa
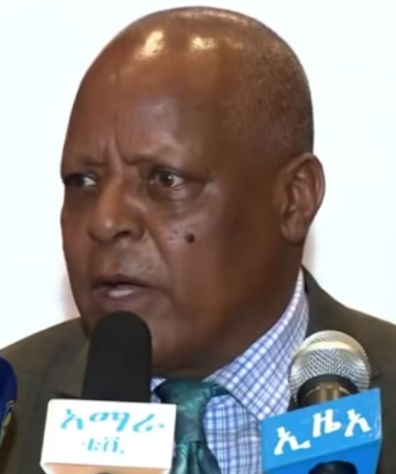
- Born: 5 July 1956 (age 70); Ambo, Shewa, Ethiopian Empire
- Education: Institute of Social Studies, Erasmus University Rotterdam (PhD); American University in Cairo (BA); Addis Ababa University
- Occupations: Political science professor Politician
- Political party: Medrek; Oromo People's Congress

Merera Gudina (Oromo: Mararaa Guddinaa) (born 5 July 1956) is an Ethiopian professor and politician. He is the leader of the Oromo People's Congress (OPC), a political party representing the Oromo people. The organization is opposed to the previous ruling Ethiopian People's Revolutionary Democratic Front and the current authoritarian ruling Abiy Ahmed's Prosperity Party. He has been described as Ethiopian "leading opposition politician".

== Personal life ==
Merera began his college education at Addis Ababa University (AAU), but was imprisoned for seven years due to participating in protests against the dictatorship of Mengistu Haile Mariam. After his release, Merera went to Egypt to complete his education at the American University in Cairo. Merera received his PhD in Political Science July 2002 from the Institute of Social Studies, at the Hague in the Netherlands under the direction of professors M.R. Doornbos and M.A.R.M. Salih, he completed his thesis, "Ethiopia: competing ethnic nationalisms and the quest for democracy, 1960-2000". As of 2009, Merera is an associate professor of political science at AAU. He participates in several scholarly conferences worldwide, including in the United States, concerning political and social developments of Ethiopia.

== Political career ==
Merera founded the Oromo National Congress (ONC) in 1996, which became the largest Oromo opposition group by parliament seats after the 2005 national elections. His OFC had allied with several other parties to form the United Ethiopian Democratic Forces. Due to a court decision in 2007 which awarded the name of the ONC to a splinter group, the original ONC assumed a new name, the Oromo people's Congress.

Merera believes in the self-determination of Oromo people and self-rule under Ethiopia umbrella. His party also wants to make Afan Oromo the co-official language of Ethiopia to empower Oromo people politically, socially and economically. Regarding Oromia secession, he opposes the idea based on mutual strategic and national interest of Oromo and other peoples. Merera has also said Oromo people have historically participated in the creation of modern Ethiopia, including the monarchy. During a parliament discussion with the ruling party, Merera made the observation, "Oromia is the stem of Ethiopia; a stem can not secede, only branches can fall off the stem."

OFC was also reported to have made an alliance with another Oromo opposition party named OFDM to form Oromo Federalist Congress (OFC).

As of January 2010, Merera is the co-chairman of the OPC and the chairman of Medrek.

Merera was detained at the Addis Ababa airport in Ethiopia upon his return from Europe in December 2016. The Ethiopian government cites charges of links to "terrorist" and "anti-peace" protest groups. On 3 March 2017, Ethiopian prosecutors formally charged Merera with supporting terrorism, which he denied.

He was put in prison in 2015. He was released from the Kaliti Prison in January 2018.
