= All-Amhara People's Organization =

Political party in Ethiopia

All-Amhara People's Organization የመላው አማራ ሕዝብ ድርጅት
- Leader: Asrat Woldeyes
- Founder: Asrat Woldeyes
- Founded: 1993
- Dissolved: 2000
- Ideology: Amhara nationalism

The All-Amhara People's Organization (AAPO; Amharic: የመላው አማራ ሕዝብ ድርጅት) is an ethnic based political party in Ethiopia, created in 1993 by Asrat Woldeyes.

== Creation ==
The All-Amhara People's Organization was created by Asrat Woldeyes in 1993 to try to limit the domination of Ethiopian politics by the Tigray People's Liberation Front (TPLF) that took power after the 1991 overthrow of the dictator Mengistu Haile-Mariam.

== 2000s ==
After the 2000 elections, when the AAPO won only one seat in the House of People's Representatives, the party suffered from internal divisions after which the leader founded the All Ethiopian Unity Party (AEUP).

== See also ==
- All Ethiopian Unity Party
