= Medrek =

Political coalition in Ethiopia

Ethiopia Federal Democratic Unity Forum Medrek መድረክ
- Chairperson: Merera Gudina
- Vice-Chairman: Beyene Petros
- Founded: 2008
- Headquarters: Addis Ababa
- Ideology: Social democracy Democratic socialism Ethnic federalism
- Political position: Centre-left to left-wing

Medrek (Amharic: መድረክ), officially the Ethiopia Federal Democratic Unity Forum (Amharic: የኢትዮጵያ ፌዴራላዊ ዴሞክራሲያዊ አንድነት መድረክ, romanized: ye’ītiyop’iya fēdēralawī dēmokirasīyawī ānidineti medireki), is an Ethiopian political coalition founded in 2008 by former defense minister Siye Abraha and former president Negasso Gidada. The election symbol of the party is five fingers. On 2008 election, Medrek won a single seat in the House of Peoples' Representatives, representing an electoral district in Addis Ababa. This was allegedly due to lack of election transparency. Medrek won 30% of the individual vote nationwide but received only one seat in parliament since Ethiopia's elections are conducted under a single-member plurality voting system.

== Background ==
Medrek was established by the Oromo Federalist Democratic Movement (OFDM), the Somali Democratic Alliance Forces (SDAF), and Arena Tigray (the Union of Tigrians for Democracy and Sovereignty, led by Gebru Asrat), former Ethiopian president Dr. Negasso Gidada, and Siye Abraha, former defense minister. In December 2009, Medrek was joined by the largest opposition party, the Unity for Democracy and Justice, led by Birtukan Mideksa. Due to ideological differences and disagreement on ethnic federalism, the Unity for Democracy and Justice left the coalition after one year of participation. The current coalition members include the Oromo People's Congress led by Merera Gudina, Oromo Federalist Democratic Movement led by Bekele Gerba, the Ethiopian Social Democratic Party led by Beyene Petros, the Union of Tigrayans for Democracy and Sovereignty (ARENA) led by Abraha Desta, and the Sidama Liberation Movement (SLM) led by Dr. Million Tumato.

Medrek fielded 270 candidates for the 2015 Ethiopian general election.

== Ideology ==
Medrek supports a social democratic economic model and the current ethnic federalism arrangement that has been implemented in Ethiopia since 1995. Medrek strongly supports preserving Ethiopian unity and sovereignty under the ethnic federal system. Medrek also supports making Afan Oromo, Tigrinya and Somali official languages of Ethiopia alongside Amharic.
