= Arena Tigray For Democracy and Sovereignty =

Political party in Ethiopia

Arena Tigray for Democracy and Sovereignty ዓረና ትግራይ ንዲሞክራሲን ንሉኣላዊነትን
- Abbreviation: Arena Tigray
- Chairperson: Abraha Desta (2020)
- Founder: Gebru Asrat
- Founded: c. 2000
- National affiliation: Medrek
- Regional affiliation: Tigray Peace and Change Council

Arena Tigray For Democracy and Sovereignty (Tigrinya: ዓረና ትግራይ ንዲሞክራሲን ንሉኣላዊነትን, romanized: ʿāranā tǝgǝrāy nǝdimokǝrāsin nǝluʾālāwinatǝn), also known as Arena Tigray, is an Ethiopian political party based in the Tigray Region and participating in the Medrek coalition federally.

== Creation ==
Arena Tigray was created by Gebru Asrat in the early 2000s, when he left the Tigray People's Liberation Front (TPLF) and the Ethiopian People's Revolutionary Democratic Front. Addis Fortune counts Arena Tigray as the second oldest political party in Tigray Region.

=== Leadership ===
Arena's first leader was Gebru Asrat. In 2017, at Arena's fourth congress, Abraha Desta, a philosophy lecturer who had spent two years in prison under TPLF rule, was elected as the new chair.

As of March 2021, Amdom Gebreselassie was head of public relations for Arena Tigray. He held the position of vice head of the Public Relations Bureau of the Transitional Government of Tigray until mid-March 2021, when he was dismissed by the federal government for publicly calling for legal action against perpetrators of sexual violence in the Tigray War and for attributing war crimes in the Tigray War to Amhara Region security forces and Eritrean Defence Forces.

== Politics ==
In 2019, Arena Tigray's leader, Gebru Asrat, was seen as a major leader of ethnic Tigray opposition in Tigray Region.

=== Federalism ===
Arena joined the Medrek national coalition of political parties at the coalition's founding in 2008. As of 2017, Arena continued to be active in Medrek.

=== 2020 Tigray regional election ===
In August 2020, prior to the 2020 Tigray regional election, Arena Tigray announced that it would boycott the election, in agreement with the National Election Board of Ethiopia (NEBE), on the grounds of "political provocations by the TPLF", the COVID-19 pandemic and what it saw as the illegitimacy of the election.

=== Tigray War ===
On 3 February 2021, Arena Tigray party member Goitom Tsegay stated his long-term opposition to the TPLF and his opposition to the Tigray War, objecting to human rights violations by Fano and other Amhara militias and their taking control of Tigray Region territory, communication blocks and a lack of transparency, the extrajudicial executions of civilians, rape, the presence and role of the Eritrean Defence Forces (EDF) in the war, and starvation. Goitom stated that "many" Arena Tigray members were "wholly against the war" but had been unable to organise a formal meeting given the war situation. Goitom concluded that peace negotiations between the federal government and "Tigray militias and political parties" would be needed to return the region to "some normalcy".

== Claims of repression ==
In February 2020, Arena Tigray members reported harassment and physical attacks. Markos Gessese, a member of the Arena Tigray executive committee, was attacked en route to lodging a complaint about harassment. Arena claimed that the attacks and harassment were deliberate, planned and decided by the TPLF. The TPLF claimed that two members of Arena had been arrested under criminal law, not for political reasons, and described Arena's claims as intending to "divide the people of Tigray".
