= Oromo People's Congress =

Former political party in Ethiopia (1996–2012)

- Founder: Merera Gudina
- Founded: April 1996
- Dissolved: 2012
- Succeeded by: OFC
- Ideology: Oromo nationalism Federalism

The Oromo People's Congress (OPC) was a federalist and Oromo nationalist opposition political party in Ethiopia. It was founded in April 1996 as the Oromo National Congress by Merera Gudina, who was its chairman. However, the party licence and name were allegedly given to a marginal splinter group by the National Election Board of Ethiopia in order to undermine the party and create confusion among the voters after the May 2005 election, so the party was forced to change its name to Oromo People's Congress prior to the 2008 by-elections. OPC merged with Oromo Federalist Democratic Movement (OFDM), forming the Oromo Federalist Congress (OFC), in 2012.

== 2005 election results ==
Until the 2005 Ethiopian general elections the OPC had not attempted to build a permanent base of support outside its leader’s home region in Ambo woreda. In that election, as the Oromo National Congress the party was part of the United Ethiopian Democratic Forces, that won 52 out of 527 seats in the Council of People's Representatives; the party won 42 seats in the Federal Parliament and 135 seats in the Oromia regional parliament in its own name.

== 2007–2009 ==
- The leadership of OPC was one of the founding members of the Forum for Democratic Dialogue (FDD). The creation of the Forum was agreed upon on June 17, 2007.
- OPC formed a coalition with the OFDM in January 2009, according to a press release issued by both parties.
- The OPC issued a press release on 5 March 2009 claiming that the ruling Ethiopian People's Revolutionary Democratic Front party committed three separate acts of harassment against its members during the prior weeks. These included a February incident where two teachers in Midakaegn woreda were severely beaten by the local police and woreda officials, and security personnel on 4 March surrounding the high school in Gedo then shooting at the students and wounding at least three (one died later in the hospital). In preparation for the 2021 Ethiopian general election, that had been constitutionally scheduled for May 2020, OFC agreed to form an electoral coalition with Oromo Liberation Front (OLF) and Oromo Nationalist Party (ONP) led by Kemal Gelchu.

== 2012 ==
The OPC merged with the OFDM, forming the Oromo Federalist Congress, in 2012.
