= Beyene Petros =

Ethiopian biologist and politician (1950–2024)

- በየነ ጴጥሮስ

Professor of Biology at Addis Ababa University
- In office 1979 – 17 September 2024

Member of the House of Peoples' Representatives
- In office 1995–2018
- Constituency: Badawacho; Shone constituency

Advisor of the Government Privatization Advisory Council
- In office 3 August 2018 – 17 September 2024

Personal details
- Born: 11 March 1950 Kaffa Province, Ethiopian Empire (present-day Hadiya, Central Ethiopia Regional State, Ethiopia)
- Died: 17 September 2024 (aged 74)
- Party: Medrek; Ethiopian Social Democratic Party
- Children: 4 Mishisalla Beyene Petros, Ermisha Beyene Petros, Bereket Beyene Petros, and Liena Beyene Petros
- Education: Tulane University; University of Wisconsin; Addis Ababa University
- Occupation: Academic; politician

Beyene Petros (Amharic: በየነ ጴጥሮስ; 11 March 1950 – 17 September 2024) was an Ethiopian politician and educator who was the Professor of Biology at Addis Ababa University and a former member of the Ethiopian House of Peoples' Representatives, representing an electoral district in Badawacho of Hadiya Zone. He was the chairman of one of the largest opposition political parties in Ethiopia, the Ethiopian Federal Democratic Forum Medrek.

== Political career ==
Petros joined politics in 1991 when the ruling EPRDF took power. He was then appointed deputy minister of Education but later resigned from government. He has been a major opposition political figure since 1995. Petros was first elected to the parliament as member for Shone constituency in the May 2000 elections. In the 2003 parliament, he served as chairman for the combined Council of Alternative Forces for Peace and Democracy in Ethiopia, the Southern Ethiopia Peoples' Democratic Coalition, and the Hadiya National Democratic Organization. When parties joined to form the United Ethiopian Democratic Forces (UEDF) in 2004, Prof. Beyene became the chairman of the UEDF. He was serving as chairman for Ethiopian Federal Democratic Forum (Medrek).

On 3 August 2018, Petros was promoted to the new Government Privatisation Advisory Council to advise Prime Minister Abiy Ahmed concerning his new economic reforms.

== Personal life and death ==
Beyene Petros was born on 11 March 1950, in Hadiya, Ethiopia. He attended elementary and high school at local schools in southern Ethiopia. He received his BSc from Addis Ababa University, MS from University of Wisconsin and Ph.D. from Tulane University all in Biology.

Petros joined the staff of Addis Ababa University in 1979 when he became a Lecturer. Later he became a Professor of Biology in 2009.

Petros was married and had four children; two girls (Mishisalla BEYENE of WFP), Liena Beyene and two boys Ermisha Beyene and Bereket Beyene . He died on 17 September 2024, at the age of 74.
