= Harari National League =

- Chairman: Ordeen Badri
- Founded: 25 August 1991
- Dissolved: 1 December 2019
- Merged into: Prosperity Party
- Ideology: Harari interests

The Harari National League (Amharic: የሐረሪ ብሔራዊ ሊግ, Harari: ዚሀረሪ መሐዲያ ሊግ) was a political party in Ethiopia. Its chairman, Ordeen Badri, was also president of the Harari Region.

== History ==
One of the Harari National League's co-founder was Duri Mohammed. The party celebrated its tenth anniversary 25 August 2001, under the leadership of chairman Fuad Ibrahim. It held its seventh party congress 30 November-1 December 2008, which was attended by almost 500 members and other participants.

At the last legislative elections, 15 May 2005, the party elected Nuriya Abdurahim Semod to represent a district at the Council of People's Representatives for the Harari Region. In the August 2005 Regional assembly elections, the HNL won 18 of the 36 seats in the assembly of the Harari Region.

In December 2019, the party merged with the Afar National Democratic Party (ANDP), the Amhara Democratic Party (ADP), the Benishangul-Gumuz People's Democratic Unity Front (BGPDUF), the Ethiopian Somali People's Democratic Party (ESPDP), the Gambela People's Democratic Movement (GPDM), the Oromo Democratic Party (ODP) and the Southern Ethiopian People's Democratic Movement (SEPDM) to form the Prosperity Party.

== See also ==
- Murad Abdulhadi
