= Southern Ethiopia Peoples' Democratic Coalition =

Political coalition in Ethiopia formed in 1992

The Southern Ethiopia People's Democratic Coalition is an opposition political coalition in Ethiopia based in the Southern Nations, Nationalities, and People's Region. At the last legislative elections held on 15 May 2005, the Coalition was part of the United Ethiopian Democratic Forces that won 52 out of 527 seats in the Council of People's Representatives (CPR).

It was founded in March 1992, when a number of political parties formed a coalition, which included the Gurage People's Democratic Front, the Omotic People's Democratic Front, the Kaffa People's Democratic Union, the Hadiya National Democratic Organization, the Yem National Democratic Movement, the Wolaita People's Democratic Front, the Sidama Liberation Movement, the Gedeo People's Democratic Organization, and Burji People's Democratic Organization. In November of the same year, four more groups joined the coalition: the Dawro People's Democratic Movement, the Timbaro People's Democratic Union, the Omo People's Democratic Union, and the Kabena Nationality Democratic Organization. In the 2003 session of the CPR, it held 2 seats.

== See also ==
- Southern Nations, Nationalities, and People's Region
