= BGN/PCGN romanization =

US/UK government romanization methods

BGN/PCGN romanization are the systems for romanization and Roman-script spelling conventions adopted by the United States Board on Geographic Names (BGN) and the Permanent Committee on Geographical Names for British Official Use (PCGN).

The systems have been approved by the BGN and the PCGN for application to geographic names, but they have also been used for personal names and text in the US and the UK.

Details of all the jointly approved systems are outlined in the National Geospatial-Intelligence Agency publication Romanization Systems and Policies (2012), which superseded the BGN 1994 publication Romanization Systems and Roman-Script Spelling Conventions. Romanization systems and spelling conventions for different languages have been gradually introduced over the course of several years. The currently used set is available on the UK government site. A complete list of BGN/PCGN systems and agreements covering the following languages is given below (the date of adoption is given in the parentheses). The status "agreement" refers to systems which were created by authorities of the corresponding nations and then adopted by BGN and PCGN.

== Systems ==
File link	Language	System	Notes
BGN/PCGN romanization	Adyghe	2012 system	
BGN/PCGN national romanization system for Afghanistan	Pashto and Dari	2007 system	
BGN/PCGN romanization	Amharic	1967 system	
BGN/PCGN romanization	Arabic	1956 system; BGN 1946, PCGN 1956	
BGN/PCGN romanization	Armenian	1981 system	
BGN/PCGN romanization	Avar	2011 system	
BGN/PCGN romanization	Azerbaijani (Cyrillic script)	2002 table of correspondences	Note that the Government of Azerbaijan abandoned the Cyrillic script in 1991 and adopted the Latin alphabet to replace it.
BGN/PCGN romanization	Baluchi	2008 system	
BGN/PCGN romanization	Bashkir	2007 agreement	
BGN/PCGN romanization	Belarusian	1979 System	
BGN/PCGN romanization	Bulgarian	2013 agreement	The agreement reflects the official Bulgarian system.
BGN/PCGN romanization	Burmese	1970 agreement	
BGN/PCGN romanization	Chechen	2008 table of correspondences	
BGN/PCGN romanization	Chinese	1979 agreement	Chinese characters are romanized by BGN/PCGN by means of the Pinyin system.
BGN/PCGN romanization	Chuvash	2011 system	
BGN/PCGN romanization	Dzongkha	2010 agreement	
BGN/PCGN romanization	Georgian	2009 agreement	
BGN/PCGN romanization	Greek	1996 agreement	Greek is romanized by BGN/PCGN by means of the ELOT 743 system.
BGN/PCGN romanization	Hebrew	(2018 agreement)	
BGN/PCGN romanization	Inuktitut	2013 agreement	
BGN/PCGN romanization	Japanese (Kana)	2017 agreement	Japanese is romanized by BGN/PCGN by means of the modified Hepburn system.
BGN/PCGN romanization	Kabardian	2011 system	
BGN/PCGN romanization	Karachay-Balkar	2008 table of correspondences	
BGN/PCGN romanization	Kazakh	1979 system	
BGN/PCGN romanization	Khmer	1972 agreement	
BGN/PCGN romanization	Korean (North Korea)	BGN/PCGN 1945 agreement	Korean is romanized by BGN/PCGN by means of the McCune–Reischauer system.
BGN/PCGN romanization	Korean (South Korea)	2011 agreement	Korean is romanized by BGN/PCGN by means of the Revised Romanization of Korean.
BGN/PCGN romanization	Kurdish	2007 system	
BGN/PCGN romanization	Kyrgyz	1979 system	
BGN/PCGN romanization	Lao	1966 agreement	
BGN/PCGN romanization	Macedonian	2013 agreement	
BGN/PCGN romanization	Maldivian	1988 agreement, with modifications 2009	
BGN/PCGN romanization	Moldovan	2002 table of correspondences	
BGN/PCGN romanization	Mongolian (Cyrillic)	1964 system; PCGN 1957, BGN 1964	
BGN/PCGN romanization	Nepali	2011 agreement	
BGN/PCGN romanization	Ossetian	2009 system	
BGN/PCGN romanization	Pashto	1968 system, 2017 revision	
BGN/PCGN romanization	Persian	1958 system; updated 2019	
BGN/PCGN romanization	Russian	1947 system; BGN 1944, PCGN 1947	
BGN/PCGN romanization	Rusyn	2016 system	
BGN/PCGN romanization	Serbian (Cyrillic script)	2005 table of correspondences	Serbian is not romanized by BGN/PCGN; instead, the Latin script that corresponds to the Cyrillic script is used.
BGN/PCGN romanization	Shan	2011 system	
BGN/PCGN romanization	Modern Syriac	2011 system	
BGN/PCGN romanization	Tajik	1994 system	
BGN/PCGN romanization	Tatar	2005 table of correspondences	
BGN/PCGN romanization	Thai	2002 agreement	
BGN/PCGN romanization	Tigrinya	2007 system	
BGN/PCGN romanization	Turkmen	2000 table of correspondences	
BGN/PCGN romanization	Udmurt	2011 system	
BGN/PCGN romanization	Ukrainian	2019 agreement	See: Romanization of Ukrainian
BGN/PCGN romanization	Urdu	2007 system	
BGN/PCGN romanization	Uyghur	2023 agreement	Uyghur is romanized by BGN/PCGN by means of the Uyghur Latin alphabet.
BGN/PCGN romanization	Uzbek	2000 table of correspondences	
BGN/PCGN romanization	Yakut	2012 system	

In addition to the systems above, BGN/PCGN adopted Roman Script Spelling Conventions for languages that use the Roman alphabet but use letters not present in the English alphabet. These conventions exist for the following four languages:

- BGN/PCGN romanization of Faroese (1968 agreement)
- BGN/PCGN romanization of German (2000 agreement)
- BGN/PCGN romanization of Icelandic (1968 agreement)
- BGN/PCGN romanization of Northern Sami (Note: The original publication refers to the language as Northern Lappish.) (1984 agreement)
