= Ethiopian People's Revolutionary Democratic Front =

1988–2019 Ethiopian political coalition

- Abbreviation: EPRDF
- Founded: 8 May 1988
- Dissolved: 1 December 2019
- Succeeded by: Prosperity Party
- Headquarters: Addis Ababa
- Newspaper: New Vision
- Youth wing: EPRDF Youth League
- Women's wing: EPRDF Women's League
- Membership (2011): 6,000,000
- Ideology: 1991–2019: Revolutionary democracy Democratic socialism Social democracy Ethnic federalism Poly-ethnic nationalism 1988–1991: Marxism–Leninism; Hoxhaism
- Political position: 1991–2019: Centre-left to left-wing 1988–1991: Far-left
- Colours: Red
- House of Peoples' Representatives (2015): 500 / 547

Website
- eprdf.org.et

Ethiopian People's Revolutionary Democratic Front
- Leaders: TPLF (1988–2018); ODP (2018–2019)
- Dates active: 8 May 1988 – 1 December 2019 (31 years, 207 days)
- Headquarters: Addis Ababa, Ethiopia
- Ideology: Ethnic federalism
- Wars: Oromo conflict, Ethiopian Civil War, Eritrean–Ethiopian War

The Ethiopian People's Revolutionary Democratic Front (Note: Amharic: የኢትዮጵያ ሕዝቦች አብዮታዊ ዲሞክራሲያዊ ግንባር, romanized: Ye’Ītiyop’iya Ḥizibochi Ābiyotawī Dīmokirasīyawī Ginibari; Somali: Jabhadda Dimuqraadiga Kacaanka Shacabka Itoobiya; Oromo: Adda Dimokraatawaa Warraaqsa Ummata Itoophiyaa; Tigrinya: ህዝባዊ ሰውራዊ ደሞክራስያዊ ግንባር ኢትዮጵያ) (EPRDF) was an ethnic federalist political coalition in Ethiopia that existed from 1988 to 2019. It consisted of four political parties: the Tigray People's Liberation Front (TPLF), Amhara Democratic Party (ADP), Oromo Democratic Party (ODP) and Southern Ethiopian People's Democratic Movement (SEPDM). After leading the overthrow of the People's Democratic Republic of Ethiopia, it dominated Ethiopian politics from 1991 to 2019. In November 2019, the EPRDF was dissolved, and Prime Minister and EPDRF chairman Abiy Ahmed merged three of the constituent parties (not including the TPLF) into his new Prosperity Party, which was officially founded on 1 December 2019.

== History ==
During the Ethiopian Civil War, the EPRDF was a rebel group battling the Derg, a military regime led by Mengistu Haile Mariam that was effectively in power from 1974 until it was replaced by the People's Democratic Republic of Ethiopia in 1987. During this period, the Derg was responsible for the deaths of tens of thousands of opponents without trial in the Qey Shibir and the 1983–1985 famine in Ethiopia resulting in 400,000 deaths.

The EPRDF was formed by the union of the TPLF and the Ethiopian People's Democratic Movement (EPDM) in early-1989. They were later joined by the OPDO (the Oromo members of the TPLF, EPLF, and EPDM) and the Ethiopian Democratic Officers' Revolutionary Movement (a small body of Derg officers captured by TPLF, most notably at Shire in February 1989, which was later disbanded after the establishment of the Transitional Government of Ethiopia).

Following the collapse of the People's Democratic Republic of Ethiopia in the early 1990s, the EPRDF gained support from the United States. Michael Johns, an Africa expert with The Heritage Foundation, wrote in 1991 that "there are some modestly encouraging signs that the front intends to abandon Mengistu's autocratic practices".

== Leadership ==
- Meles Zenawi (8 May 1988 – 20 August 2012)
- Hailemariam Desalegn (16 September 2012 – 27 March 2018)
- Abiy Ahmed (27 March 2018 – 1 December 2019)

== Organization ==
The EPRDF was an alliance of four political parties:

- Oromo Democratic Party (ODP), which is based in the Oromia Region (formerly known as OPDO)
- Amhara Democratic Party (ADP) based in the Amhara Region (formerly known as ANDM)
- Southern Ethiopian People's Democratic Movement (SEPDM) based in the Southern Nations, Nationalities, and Peoples' Region
- Tigray People's Liberation Front (TPLF) based in the Tigray Region

The EPRDF was led by a Council as well as an executive committee, whose members were selected every three years by a congress of the party. The four member parties had the same organizational structure. Government and party structures were closely intertwined.

The other five regions of Ethiopia were governed by parties which were either created or heavily influenced by the EPRDF. One of the earliest was the Afar People's Democratic Organization in the Afar Region, which subsequently merged with other Afar political groups to create the Afar National Democratic Party (ANDP). These were the five regional parties:

- Afar National Democratic Party (ANDP) in Afar Region
- Argoba People's Democratic Organization (APDO) for the Argobba people
- Hareri National League (HNL) in Harari Region
- Gambela People's Democratic Movement (GPDM) in Gambela Region
- Ethiopian Somali People's Democratic Party (ESPDP) in Somali Region
- Benishangul-Gumuz People's Democratic Unity Front (BGPDUF) in Benishangul-Gumuz Region

== Ideology ==
=== Revolutionary democracy ===
Revolutionary democracy replaced Marxism–Leninism as the EPRDF's official ideology in the early 1990s, not because the front had lost their belief in Marxism, but rather because of the international situation (the Soviet Union was dissolved in 1991). The main message of revolutionary democracy, similar to that found in Marxist–Leninist thought, is that a vanguard party should rule because it represents the people and has "supposedly superior knowledge of the nature of social development conferred on them by the EPRDF ideology." Similar to Marxism–Leninism, the EPRDF prefers to categorize society into classes such as the peasantry, the bourgeoisie, the proletariat and the comprador bourgeoisie and considers its main adversary to be imperialism.

The peasantry are considered the main class in Ethiopia, since they form a majority of the population, and they are considered the pillar of revolutionary democracy. Upon seizing power, the front was suspicious of the petite bourgeoisie, believing it to be inclined to oppose the front's policies. Despite this, the front believed it could win over the petite bourgeoisie through economic incentives and successful policy. Importantly, if members of the petite bourgeoisie oppose the EPRDF, the front will "empty their 'belly and pocket'". The urban proletariat are in contrast naturally inclined towards the EPRDF, and the EPRDF seeks to recruit members of these class so as to strengthen the front's organizational links with the trade unions. The EPRDF asserts that the "local investor", that is, the capitalist, will naturally be hostile towards the front and its policies, and the front should therefore try to persuade this class to become neutral. Religious organizations are deemed reactionary by the EPRDF.

Some people state that the EPRDF has not espoused a well-defined unified ideology or political philosophy. Its members held a variety of positions that could be broadly defined as being to the left of the opposition parties. The EPRDF traditionally identified itself with a number of general goals, namely rapid export-based economic growth; close cooperation with the United States in foreign and defense policies; close cooperation with China on economic and trade policies: and several newer issues, such as administrative reform. Administrative reform encompassed several themes, namely simplification and streamlining of government bureaucracy; privatization of state-owned enterprises; and adoption of measures, including tax reform, in preparation for the expected strain on the economy posed by a rapidly growing population. Other priorities in the early 1990s included the promotion of a more active and positive role for Ethiopia following the collapse of the People's Democratic Republic of Ethiopia, the internationalization of Ethiopia's economy by the liberalization and promotion of domestic demand (expected to lead to the industrialization) and the promotion of education. A business-inspired commitment to free enterprise was tempered by the insistence of protectionism and tariffs.

==== Relation to liberalism ====
The EPRDF opposed liberal democracy, and liberalism in general. Despite this, revolutionary democracy can be considered a mixture of communist and liberal thought. The front views liberal democracy and free market capitalism as decadent, and has a "romantic attachment" to the beliefs of Vladimir Lenin, who condemned liberal democracy as the dictatorship of the bourgeoisie (literally the dictatorship of the upper class) while supporting Lenin's assertion of the need for a vanguard party which practices democratic centralism. It considers liberal democracy to be "ill-fit and unsustainable", but ironically much of the front's economic policies are based on the tacit acknowledgement of the need of some liberalism in the economic field.

==== Relation to communism ====
With the majority of EPRDF's top leaders being former members of the Marxist–Leninist League of Tigray, a Hoxhaist organization led by among others Meles Zenawi, Marxist ideology still played a prominent role in party discourse, with some even claiming that the front is hiding their ideology. Theodore M. Vestal claims that the front based its ideology on Marxist–Leninist revisionism, believing it explains the regime's authoritarian nature. Of the communists traits in revolutionary democracy, most of them have been borrowed from Mao Zedong Thought, an ideology conceived by Chinese leader Mao Zedong.

== Election results ==
Election	Leader	No. of candidates	No. of seats won	No. of Constituency votes	% of Constituency vote	Government/Opposition
1994	Meles Zenawi		463 / 544			Government
1995	Meles Zenawi	1,881	471 / 546	16,429,727	82.9%	Government
2000	Meles Zenawi		481 / 547			Government
2005	Meles Zenawi		327 / 547	12,237,655	59.8%	Government
2010	Meles Zenawi	1,349	545 / 547			Government
2015	Hailemariam Desalign	1,851	500 / 547	26,403,177		Government
