= Ethiopian Journalists Forum =

Journalist association disbanded in 2014

Ethiopian Journalists Forum (EJF; Amharic: የኢትዮጵያ ጋዜጠኞች መድረክ, romanized: ye’ītiyop’iya gazēt’enyochi medireki) is an independent journalist association in Ethiopia disbanded on 24 June 2014 by the government. The association was founded on 30 January 2014 in Addis Ababa by journalists concerned about the deteriorating state of press freedom and freedom of speech in the country. Its objective was to protect and promote freedom of speech and freedom of the press.

Since its inception, EJF was targeted by the government and other journalist associations. The association was accused of working with foreign powers, human right organizations, and outlawed Ethiopian groups to elicit violence and commit terrorism in the country. Its leaders were subjected to harassment and threats, and were finally forced to flee the country.

The freedom of assembly and association are guaranteed by the 1995 Constitution of Ethiopia. Freedom of the Mass Media and Access to Information Proclamation of Ethiopia also states: “Journalists have a right to organize themselves into professional associations of their choice." However, the government limits the right in practice.

== See also ==
- Human rights in Ethiopia
- Media in Ethiopia
- Internet in Ethiopia
- Zone 9 bloggers
- Eskinder Nega
- Temesgen Desalegn
- Reeyot Alemu
