= List of newspapers in Ethiopia =

This is a list of newspapers in Ethiopia.

== List of newspapers ==
Newspaper	Location	First issued	Publisher / Notes	Languages	Website
Addis Fortune	Addis Ababa	2000	Independent News and Media Plc	English	addisfortune.news/
Africa News Channel	Addis Ababa	2014			
Addis Standard	Addis Ababa	2011	JAKENN Publishing P.L.C.	English	Addisstandard.com
Addis Tribune	Addis Ababa	1992			
Addis Zemen	Addis Ababa	1941	Ethiopian Press Agency (government)	Amharic	
Awramba Times	Addis Ababa	2007		Amharic, English	awrambatimes.com
Bariisaa	Addis Ababa		Ethiopian Press Agency (government)	Oromo	press.et/afanoromo
Berhānenā salām	Addis Ababa	1925			
Capital Ethiopia	Addis Ababa	1998		English	capitalethiopia.com/
Courrier d'Ethiopie	Addis Ababa	1913–1936			
Daily Monitor	Addis Ababa	2000	Monitor Ltd		
Democracia		1974	Ethiopian People's Revolutionary Party		
Efoytā	Addis Ababa	1997	Fānā démokrāsi	Amharic	
Ethiopian Herald	Addis Ababa	1943	Ethiopian Press Agency (government)	English	
Ethiopian Gazette	Toronto	2018	AMG Brands Network	English	ethiopiangazette.com
Feteh		2008–2012	closed; chief editor Temesgen Desalegn arrested		
The Reporter (Ethiopian Reporter)	Addis Ababa	1995	Media Communications Centre	Amharic, English	ethiopianreporter.com/
Serto Ader	Addis Ababa	1980	Commission for Organizing the Party of the Working People of Ethiopia		
Sun	Addis Ababa	1996	G.D Pub. House		
Ṭobiyā	Addis Ababa	1993	ʼAkpāk	Amharic	
Voice of Ethiopia	Addis Ababa	1961–1969	National Patriotic Association		
Yäsäffiw hezb dems		1974			
Ye'Zareyitu Ethiopia / L'Ethiope d'Aujourd'hui	Addis Ababa	1952		Amharic, French	
Yeroo		1999–2000, 2018–		Oromo, English	Yeroo.org
Gebeya Media		2018, –		Amharic, English	gebeyaethiopia.com

== See also ==
- Mass media in Ethiopia: Newspapers
- Internet in Ethiopia
- List of radio stations in Africa: Ethiopia

== Bibliography ==
- "Ethiopia: Directory: the Press". Africa South of the Sahara 2004. Regional Surveys of the World. Europa Publications. 2004. p. 429+. ISBN 1857431839.
