= Habtamu Ayalew =

Ethiopian journalist, political analyst and former opposition prisoner

Habtamu Ayalew Teshome ሀብታሙ አያሌው ተሾመ

Personal details
- Born: Addis Ababa, Ethiopia
- Party: Unity for Democracy and Justice
- Occupation: Analytical journalist
- Known for: Former opposition prisoner: Torture and imprisonment in Ethiopia; 2015 election; Prisoner of conscience (Amnesty International)

Habtamu Ayalew Teshome (Amharic: ሀብታሙ አያሌው ተሾመ) is an Ethiopian journalist and political analyst who was formerly imprisoned and tortured as an opposition leader in Ethiopia during the EPRDF rule.

== Background ==
Teshome analyzes the daily live Amharic Ethio 360 Ethiopian news broadcast from its headquarters in Washington D.C., through satellite TV, and social media since 2019.

The TPLF–led EPRDF regime in Ethiopia claimed consecutive election victories for nearly three decades in the country that was described as a repressive ruling and condemned for a frequent crackdown of opposition parties, journalists, and dissidents. The regime announced wins for 2005, 2010, and 2015 elections with 99.6% and 100% victories in the latter two terms. During the 2015 election, international bodies reported a crackdown on opposition parties and their supporters. HRW reported difficulties for oppositions in registering candidates and acquiring funds, arrests, harassment, intimidation, confiscating their equipment, and denying permits. Closer to the election, the suspicious death of opposition members and candidates was also reported. In addition, the authorities arrested opposition leaders, including Habtamu and charged them with the Anti-Terrorism Proclamation (ATP). See ATP, for the abuse of the anti-terrorism law to persecute opposition.

== Early years ==
Habtamu was active since his youth and enrolled in political programs organized by the ruling party. He then assumed a leadership position for an opposition, Unity for Democracy and Justice (UDJ) party and served in communications, activism, and overall campaigns until he was imprisoned in 2014.

== Detention (July 2014 to December 2015) ==
On 8 July 2014, Habtamu was detained at the Maekelawi prison in Addis Ababa. As required by law, police reportedly did not bring him before a judge within 48 hours of his detention, and he was not formally charged until late October, which is also another violation of the law. Defense Attorneys and families also alleged authorities for denying them visits.

== Terrorism charges ==
Habtamu's terrorism charges were for allegedly providing support to an opposition Ginbot 7 party and which was designated a terrorist group by the ruling party. Reportedly, his charges involved both conspiracies for terrorism and incitement to terrorism. TPLF's Getachew Reda accused the opposition for alleged engagement and connection to terrorist organizations. See ATP, for the abuse of the anti-terrorism law for persecuting opposition.

=== The 2009 Anti-Terrorism Proclamation (ATP) ===
International bodies criticized ATP as a deeply-flawed law that the government abused to limit freedom of the press, silence voices, and persecute members of perceived opponents. The series of abuse that occurred ahead of the 2015 election was characterized as the manifestation of politically motivated hostilities. Amnesty International and other rights bodies reported that Habtamu was one of the political prisoners who was subjected to such terrorism charges and prolonged ill-treatment for nearly two years.

== Torture during imprisonment ==
Habtamu's torture and ill-treatment exposed him to Grade 3 hemorrhoids. Human rights organizations reported that the harsh prison conditions and abusing techniques at the ″notorious″ Maekelawi torture chambers involved hanging, beating, tying prisoners in a stress position, electric shocks, prolonged physical exercises, and detaining people shackled in solitary confinement. Additional techniques included hanging a bottle of water to a prisoner's penis, pulling nails, exposure to cold, nudity, and being subjected to ethnic and other forms of slurs. Detainees were coerced to confess and sign incriminating evidence.

Habtamu got detained in one of the darkest, overcrowded, and terribly confined Maekelawi cells, which is also known as cell No. 7 (the Tawla bet), that he shared with other detainees. Mattresses were often wet due to sewerage flooding. Detainees were generally brought out to access the toilet twice a day around 6 am and 6 pm, for a total of a shared 10 minutes access time. Habtamu revealed that, on top of such restrictions, he was singled out and denied access to the toilet. One of the interrogation techniques applied to him included stabbing his head with an object that induced cold sensations and placed him in a suggestible mental state.

Habtamu told the VOA that prison authorities rejected the court orders, to allow Habtamu access medical treatment due to his deteriorating health conditions. There were also instances when his health reports were confiscated. The New York Times reported that Habtamu was denied communication with lawyers and his family when he missed the meetings organized by prison monitors. The report also pointed out that he was repeatedly beaten, mentally tortured, and held in solitary confinement for months. Prison officers also told him, ″We are the police, we are the prosecutor, we are the judge,″ and ″We are everywhere.″

== Acquittal without release ==
Refworld reported that on 20 August 2015, the High Court acquitted Habtamu of terrorism charges due to a lack of evidence. Amnesty International released another report mentioning that Habtamu and other political prisoners were formally acquitted on 20 September 2015, by which time his health condition had further deteriorated. On 2 December, the Supreme Court upheld the High Court's acquittal of Habtamu.

== Post-acquittal appeal and medical travel restriction ==
Persecutors appealed against Habtamu's acquittal, which allegedly prevented him from taking travels for his medical referrals that were not available in the country. Public Campaigns were held against this restriction, and additionally, international bodies made calls on the government to investigate his torture, ill-treatment, and the causes of his illness.

== Self-imposed exile and political engagements ==
Due to crackdown, harassment, and torture, DOS reported that several Ethiopians sought political asylum in other countries or remained abroad in self-imposed exile. Habtamu remained in the United States following his medical recovery and resumed his work in human rights and Analytical Journalism— for ESAT, then to Ethio360 Media and as an active Social media influencer on Ethiopian politics with over 225, 000 Facebook and 125, 000 Twitter followers.

== Reactions ==
1. Human Rights Watch′s report said the Ethiopian government should immediately drop politically motivated charges brought against dissidents under the country's deeply flawed anti-terrorism law, specifying the 2014 crackdown against four opposition leaders including Habtamu Ayalew of the UDJ party. It added that the charges were part of an intensified crackdown against political opponents.
2. The U.S. House of Representatives introduced a resolution, H. RES. 861 on Human rights Practices that listed the serious human and international rights violations against opposition members and journalists and called it "state-sponsored" violence. The report criticized abuse of the ATP law and authorities' refusal of Habtamu's timely life-saving medical treatment. The report described the unconscious health status that Habtamu was found in due to ill-treatment during his imprisonment.
3. Amnesty International called on Ethiopian authorities to allow Habtamu, an opposition politician to obtain life-saving surgery and medical treatment abroad. The report specified the severe progression of the Grade-3 hemorrhoids. Amnesty also detailed the harsh prison conditions, exposed the tortures, denial of access to toilet facilities and the terrorism charges that the government imposed against opposition voices. It also called on the authorities to promptly and impartially investigate the detention conditions that caused Habtamu's health to deteriorate.
  In a separate statement, the rights group released a report on the 2014/2015 government hostilities, arbitrary pre-trial charges, and detentions, and listed the various torture methods used against opposition party members and suspected dissent— listing the names of detainees including Habtamu, the ATP charges, and denial of access to lawyers and families, jailers coercing detainees to sign incriminating evidence, unfair trials, and the courts' failures to order investigations into the complaints. In its earlier report, it also called on the government to release protestors and to stop crushing political opposition and its hostilities ahead of the May 2015 election, listing Habtamu and others who were charged with ATP.
4. The 2015 and 2016 U.S. Country Reports on Human Rights Practices released a report on violations, tortures, politically motivated terrorism trials, prison conditions, widespread censorship and surveillance, and the long list of violations against journalists, opposition members, dissents, and unofficial detentions of NGOs. The report covered violations of rights to appear in front of a judge within 48 hours of detention, pre-trial imprisonments, and ill-treatment. It also confirmed the lack of evidence for the terrorism charges against Habtamu and other political prisoners, and hence the acquittal.
  In its 2016 report, DOS exposed the continued censorship and surveillance against opposition political party leaders and journalists that involved telephone tapping, electronic eavesdropping, and agents attempting to lure perceived opponents into illegal acts by calling and pretending to be representatives of groups–designated by parliament as terrorist organizations– interested in making financial donations. Other intimidations included using paid informants to report activities of individuals, active political groups, militia members, and unwarranted home visits and searches of their homes. The US also previously released reports on the Habtamu et al. allegations and court cases.
5. Public cyber campaign: the diaspora and media brought awareness to the issues of medical travel restriction against Habtamu.

== See also ==
- Andualem Aragie
- Reeyot Alemu
- Eskinder Nega
- Daniel Bekele
- Arena Tigray
- Bekele Gerba
- Temesgen Desalegn
- List of detained journalists and activists in Ethiopia (2023)
