= Kaliti Prison =

Maximum security prison in Ethiopia

- Interactive map of Kaliti Prison
- Location: Ethiopia; 8.914189°N 38.764308°E
- Status: Operational
- Population: Approximately 8,000 (2012)

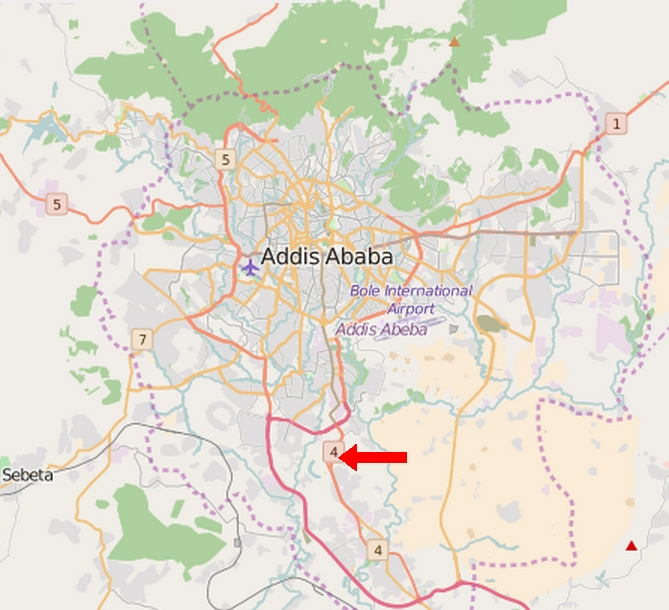
Location of Kaliti Prison within Addis Ababa

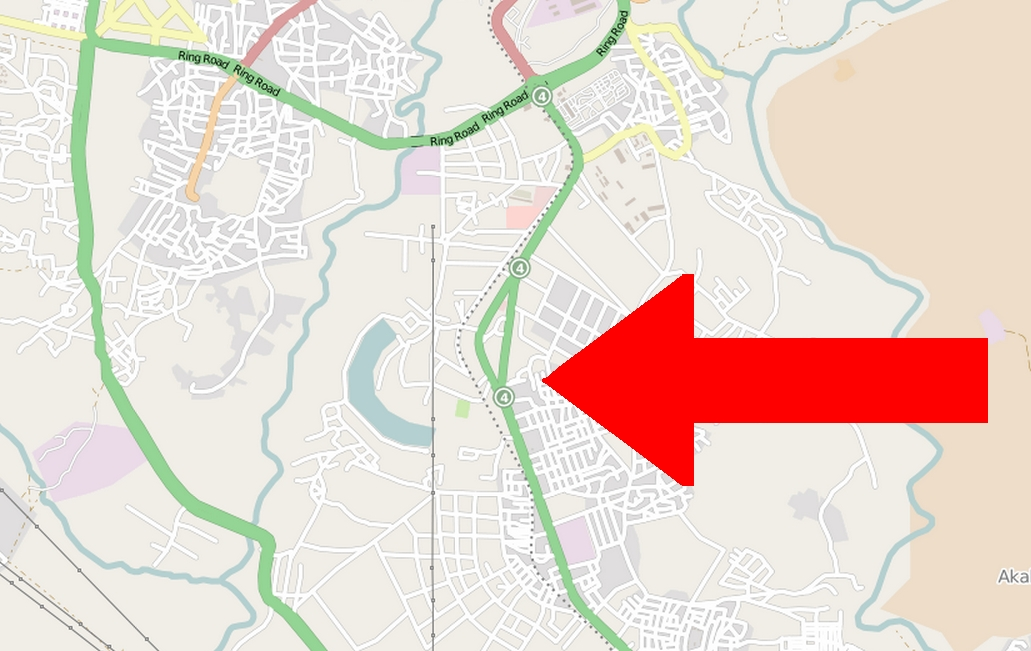
Location within Akaky Kaliti, one of the subcities of Addis Ababa

Kaliti Prison is a maximum security prison in Addis Ababa, Ethiopia. Commonly referred to as a gulag (locally known as "Maremiya" which means correction center) it serves as the main prison of the country. It is 11 km south of central Addis Ababa, in Akaki Kaliti, the southernmost subcity of the nation's capital.

The original prison compound is a makeshift structure that was built after 1991 when the Derg regime fell and was not intended as a prison. Most of the structures built by 2004 had been built by prisoners by their own means and with help from NGOs.

== Description ==
Part of the prison consists of sheet-metal shacks arranged in a dense maze.

Within the prison there are 8 zones (however zone 8 is not in use according to the recollection of Martin Schibbye). The group Zone 9 bloggers is named after a non-existent ninth zone.

Around 2012, the prison held approximately 8,000 inmates. A 2009 Human Rights League of the Horn of Africa (HRLHA) report described overcrowding in the prison with hundreds of inmates being held in single, poorly ventilated cells. They reported that individuals were exposed to tuberculosis, fleas, lice, that there was a lack of sanitation, that water for drinking and washing was insufficient, that inmates had to sleep on cold, concrete floors, and that access to medical care was nearly absent. They also reported that "complaints against all these human rights violations being severely punishable". Personnel at the prison are known to have tortured inmates.

== 2016 fire ==
A fire broke out on 3 September 2016 and continued on until the next day. Prisoners attempted to escape during the chaos, and gunshots were heard. Two prisoners were claimed to have been killed trying to escape, while 21 other inmates were said to have perished from "stampede and suffocation". At least 23 people were killed in total. The fire occurred during the deadly nationwide 2016 Ethiopian protests, and may have been related.

== Prisoners ==
=== Notable inmates ===
- Hamza Borana: Oromo Civil, Political and Human Rights activist. Presently incarcerated as a Political Prisoner.
- Colonel Gamachu Ayyanaa: A Colonel in the Ethiopian Army and Oromo Political activist. Presently incarcerated as a Political Prisoner.
- Merera Gudina, Oromo human rights activist, released in January 2018
- Lammi Begna, an Oromo human right activist and student leader, he was sentenced to 15 years of imprisonment. He was released in October 2013 after completing his terms of prison without parole.
- Aslii Oromo, an OLF army commander and the first female prisoner in history to receive the death penalty. She was released from prison after 18 years of incarceration.
- Siye Abraha, a leader of the Tigrayan People's Liberation Front, spent six years at Kaliti and was released in 2007.
- Teddy Afro, aka Tewodros Kassahun, an Ethiopian singer
- Reeyot Alemu, Ethiopian journalist
- Andualem Aragie, Vice President and Press Secretary for the Unity for Democracy and Justice party
- Tesfahun Chemeda, Oromo rights advocate, died in Kaliti
- Temesgen Desalegn, Ethiopian journalist
- Serkalem Fasil, Ethiopian journalist
- Befeqadu Hailu, Ethiopian writer, activist, blogger, and member of the Zone 9 bloggers
- Birtukan Mideksa is an Ethiopian politician, former judge, founder and leader of Unity for Democracy and Justice, the opposition party. She was held in a cell measuring 2 x 3 metres that she shared with two others.
- Berhanu Nega, Economics professor and politician
- Eskinder Nega, Ethiopian journalist and blogger
- Martin Schibbye, a Swedish journalist who spent 438 days there with photographer Johan Persson
- Hailu Shawul, Ethiopian engineer and chairman of the Coalition for Unity and Democracy
- Woubshet Taye, Ethiopian journalist
- Asaminew Tsige, retired Brigadier-General in the Ethiopian Air Force
- Mesfin Woldemariam, Ethiopian academic and peace activist
- Ingela Jansson, Swedish woman imprisoned for fraud, released in 2018 after spending 8 years at Kaliti.

== Layout ==
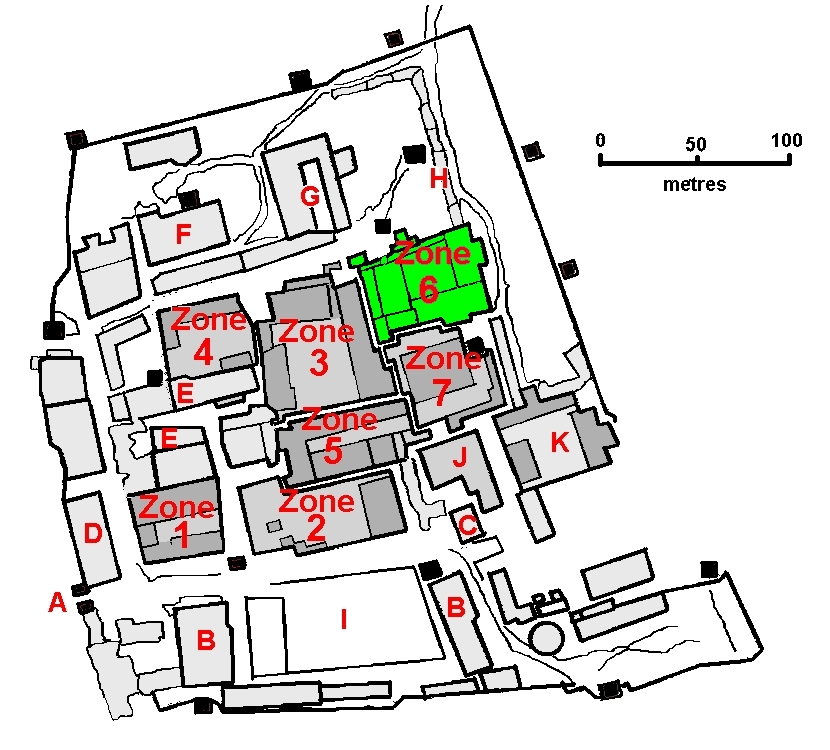
Kaliti Prison
A: Main entrance
B: Administration, office
C: Administration, office, warden's office, meeting place for close relatives and the embassy
D: Monitored meeting rooms for lawyers and prisoners
E: Injera bakery
F: Workshop and vocational school
G: High school
H: Visiting area
I: Soccer field

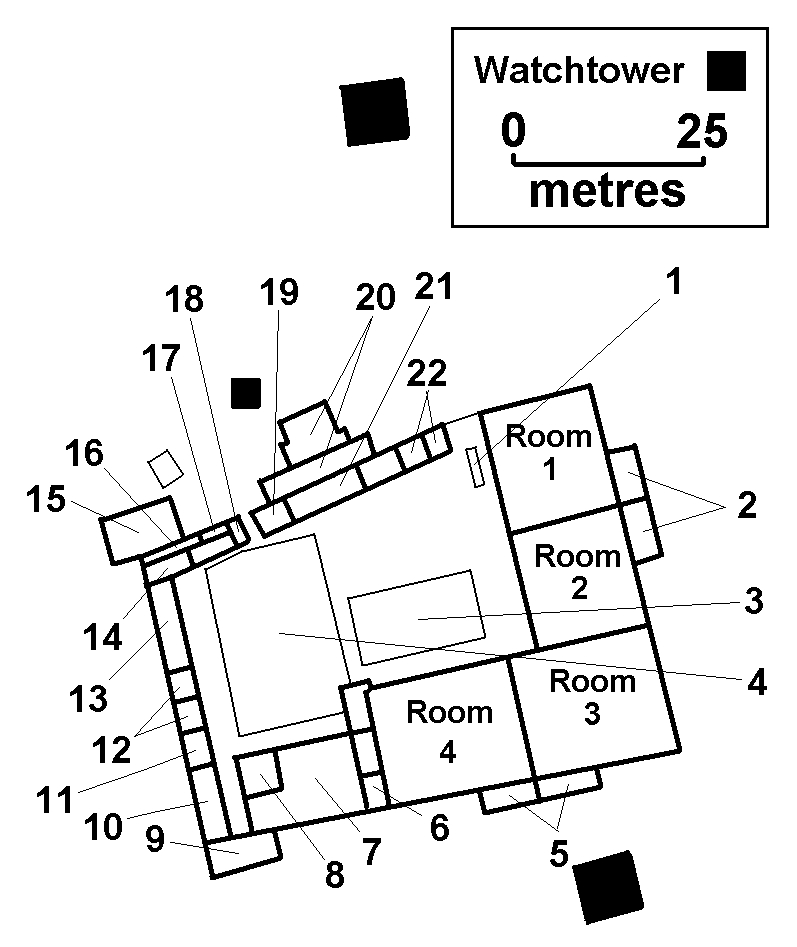
Zone 6
1: Washing place for clothes
2: WC
3: Table for carambole under a roof
4: Cement field
5: WC
6: Kiosk
7: Café
8: Mosque
9: Orthodox church
10: Workshop
11: Tailor's shop
12: Barber
13: Protestant church
14: Economic committee's office
15: Kitchen
16: Prisoner committee's administration
17: Disciplinary committee's officer and punishment room
18: Prisoner committee's room for speakers and music
19: Prisoner committee's office for counseling
20: Office for the zone police officers
21: Library and classroom

== See also ==
- Human rights in Ethiopia
