= Zelalem Kibret =

Ethiopian legal activist

Zelalem Kibret is an Ethiopian human rights activist and legal scholar. He emigrated to the US in 2016.

== Early life and education ==
Kibret grew interested in politics from a young age due to the Soviet-era literature in his childhood home, and from hearing of the violence following the contested 2005 Ethiopian general election, the first in which he could vote.

Kibret worked with the Ethiopian Human Rights Council. He did his LLM at Addis Ababa University, and became a lawyer.

== Career ==
Kibret was appointed professor of law at Ambo University.

In 2011, Kibret turned to blogging as a medium for discussing Ethiopian human rights, after the newspaper Addis Neger was shut down by the government. He blogged as part of the Zone 9 bloggers, which attracted attention from the security forces of Ethiopia. In 2012, Kibret was tortured and in 2014, imprisoned in Kaliti prison alongside his colleagues for criticising the government. After being released after just over a year behind bars, Kibret continued to be harassed by government officials including confiscating his passport so that he could not accept an award for the Zone 9 Bloggers in Paris from Reporters Without Borders.

Kibret could not return to his job at the university. In 2016 he emigrated to the US and took on an African Leadership Initiative fellowship during the presidency of Barack Obama at the University of Virginia and the College of William & Mary. In 2018, Kibret was selected as one of 30 African pioneers by Quartz Africa. He is currently a visiting scholar at the Center for Human Rights and Global Justice at the New York University School of Law.
