= Serkalem Fasil =

Ethiopian journalist

- Born: c. 1978
- Occupation: Journalist
- Known for: 2005 imprisonment during the election
- Spouse: Eskinder Nega
- Awards: IWMF Courage in Journalism Award, 2007

Serkalem Fasil (Amharic: ሰርካለም ፋሲል; born c. 1978) is an Ethiopian journalist and former co-publisher of the newspapers Asqual, Menilik, and Satenaw.

== Career ==
In 1997, Fasil began her journalistic career at the newspaper Wenchef. The following year, at the age of twenty, she founded her own newspaper, Menilik, put out by her own publishing house. She began another, Asqual, in 2001, and a third, Satenaw, in 2004. She served Menilik's deputy editor and the chairwoman of Satenaw's board.

=== Arrested ===
In November 2005, Fasil was arrested along with thirteen other reporters, including her husband, Eskinder Nega, after publishing articles critical of the Ethiopian government's actions during the May 2005 parliamentary elections. Fasil and her co-defendants were charged with "treason, outrages against the Constitution and incitement to armed conspiracy".

=== Prisoner of conscience ===
Amnesty International identified her as a prisoner of conscience, who had not advocated or used violence. She was being held in a Kaliti Prison in Addis Ababa in a rat-, cockroach-, and flea-infested cell. While in prison, Fasil gave birth to her and Nega's son. She was released by presidential pardon on 10 April 2007, along with her husband and 27 other defendants.

=== Award ===
Fasil won a "Courage in Journalism Award" from the IWMF (International Women's Media Foundation) in 2007. She donated the prize money to Amnesty International in thanks for helping to secure her release from prison.

== See also ==
- Human rights in Ethiopia
- List of detained journalists and activists in Ethiopia (2023)
