= Zone 9 bloggers =

Ethiopian blogging collective

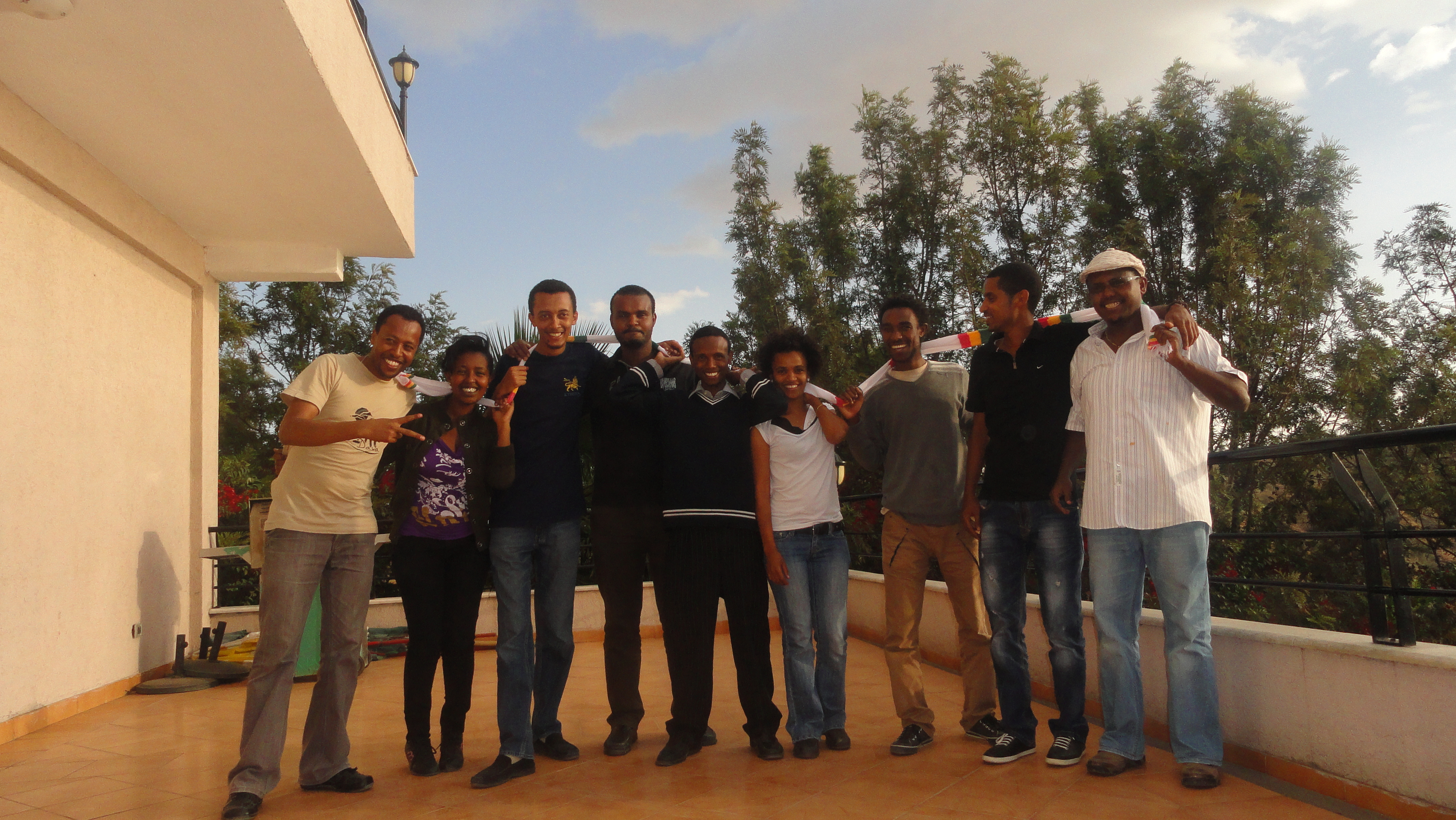
Members of the Zone 9 blogging collective in December 2012

The Zone 9 bloggers (Amharic: የዞን 9 ብሎገሮች, romanized: yezoni zet’enyi bilogerochi) are a blogging collective from Ethiopia, who maintain a blog in Amharic. On 25 and 26 April 2014, the Ethiopian government arrested six members of the Zone 9 bloggers network and three other journalists, who faced terrorism charges for their writing at the time. The action had sparked an online protest.

They were additionally charged with conspiracy for using basic online encryption tools that journalists routinely use to protect their sources. The arrested bloggers and journalists received training in digital security from the Tactical Technology Collective / Front Line Defenders Security in a Box program.

Ethiopia's constitution explicitly protects freedom of speech and the right to privacy, yet the media is controlled by the government. Although the Internet is harder to censor than broadcast or print, the government has exercised control by jailing those who use the Internet to communicate critically about social or political issues in the country. There is only one Internet service provider (ISP) in Ethiopia, Ethio telecom, and it is owned by the government. Also in 2012, Ethio telecom blocked access to the Tor network, which lets users browse the Internet anonymously and access blocked websites.

On 8 and 9 July 2015, five of the bloggers were released from prison and all charges against them were dropped.

In 2015, the Zone 9 bloggers were awarded the International Press Freedom Award from the Committee to Protect Journalists.

== History ==
Zone 9 got its name from an Ethiopian state prison in Addis Ababa called commonly known as Kaliti maximum security prison, which has eight zones. The bloggers, who felt that Ethiopia was becoming a bigger prison (Zone 9), named themselves Zone9ers. The group's motto is "We Blog Because We Care."

The arrest of the Zone 9 bloggers occurred on April 25, 2014, two days after they announced that they would resume blogging on the Zone 9 blog after a silence of nearly six months.

In November 2015, the Zone 9 bloggers were awarded the International Press Freedom Award from the Committee to Protect Journalists. Similarly, in November 2015 the collective was awarded Reporters Without Borders' Citizen Journalism Award. Furthermore, in October 2016, the group was nominated as one of the finalists of the 2016 Martin Ennals Award for Human Rights Defenders.

== Works of the Zone 9 bloggers ==
As a collective focusing on human rights, good governance, education, social justice, corruption and non-violent social transformation, the works of the Zone 9 bloggers can be divided into the following:

1. Opinion pieces and feature articles focused on rule of law, constitutionality, economic, educational and cultural rights in Ethiopia. In these writings the bloggers have encouraged the citizens of Ethiopia, religious groups, ethnic leaders, opposition political groups and civic society groups to respect the constitution and end impunity in the country. As a part of this effort they have conducted four major online campaigns which demanded that the Ethiopian government respect the constitution.
2. Documenting human rights abuses and violations of law by both state and non-state actors in the country. They reported on mistreatment of journalists and citizens by reporting on court hearings, trials, prisons and their experiences of Ethiopia. They have written on telecommunications services, education, environment and gender issues.
3. Bringing the situation of Ethiopia's political prisoners to public attention. They visited political prisoners and published messages from them.

== Arrests and charges ==
The three journalists and six bloggers known as the Zone 9 bloggers were charged with terrorism on 18 July for having links to an outlawed group, for allegedly planning attacks, and for attending digital security training.

The six Zone 9 bloggers and the three journalists who are detained are:

- Befeqadu Hailu – a writer, activist, and blogger
- Mahlet Fantahun – a data expert in Government's Ministry of Health
- Atnaf Berahane – an IT professional in Addis Ababa city administration, a digital security expert and a blogger.
- Natnael Feleke – an employee of the Construction and Business Bank, an economist by profession and a passionate advocate of human rights
- Zelalem Kibret – a lecturer at Ambo University, a lawyer and a blogger
- Abel Wabela – an engineer at Ethiopian Airlines, an engineer and blogger
- Edom Khassay – a freelancer and an active member of the Ethiopian Environmental Journalists Association (EEJA)
- Tesfalem Waldyes – a freelancer for Addis Standard and other renowned media outlets
- Asmamaw Hailegeorgis – a journalist at Addis Guday newspaper

== Timeline ==
=== April 2014: arrest ===
On 23 April 2014, the group announced on social media that they would be resuming their activities, following a temporary suspension of their activities due to increased harassment and surveillance by authorities. Two days later, on 25 April, 6 members of the group were arrested in what appeared to be a coordinated operation at their offices and in the street on the afternoon of 25 April 2014 by both uniformed and plain clothes policemen. All six people were first taken to their homes, which police searched and confiscated private laptops and literature. Freelance journalists Tesfalem Waldyes and Edom Kassaye were also arrested. On 26 April, Asmamaw Hailegiorgis was arrested.

All 9 men and women were taken to the Federal Police Crime Investigation Center commonly known as Maekelawi police station, in Addis Ababa, where detainees are reported to be routinely subjected to coercive torture methods, unlawful interrogation tactics, and poor detention conditions.

=== April–June 2014: court hearings ===
All nine individuals were brought before a judge Criminal Bench at the Arada Federal First Instance Court without the presence of their legal counsel or family members. The court ordered that they should be remanded in custody. Befekadu Hailu, Mahlet Fantahun and Abel Wabela were remanded in custody until 8 May 2014 and the other detainees until 7 May 2014.

Sources claim that the court record shows that the police requested remand for the detainees to obtain further evidence that they were "inciting chaos and violence through different websites pursuant to a plan to destabilize the country using social media by getting financial and intellectual support from a foreign force which calls itself a human rights defender". The name of the organisation is not specified. Such accusations have no lawful basis under Ethiopia's domestic criminal law and therefore conflict with Ethiopia's obligations under the African Charter and the International Covenant on Civil and Political Rights.

On 7 May, Atnaf Berhane, Zelalem Kibret, Natnael Feleke, Asmamaw Hailegiorgis, Tesfalem Waldyes and Edom Kassaye were brought before an Addis Ababa court. At the brief hearing, police requested more time for their investigation. On 8 May, Befekadu Hailu, Abel Wabela, and Mahlet Fantahun were brought before the same court. According to multiple reports, two of the bloggers claimed they were beaten. Police requested more time for their investigation. The next hearing for the three was scheduled to take place on 18 May 2014.

Both hearings were closed to the public, despite many attempts by diplomats and others to attend.

On 17 May, Atnaf Berahane, Zelalem Kibret, Natnael Feleke, Asmamaw Hailegiorgis, Tesfalem Waldyes and Edom Kassaye were brought before the same court for the third time in a row without apparent charge. Police requested and were granted an additional 28 days for further investigation into their suspected violations of the 2009 anti-terrorism law, which can carry sentences from 5–10 years. The next hearing was rescheduled to take place on 14 June 2014 at the same court. On 18 May, in a similar manner to the first group of bloggers the second group of bloggers (Befekadu Hailu, Abel Wabela and Mahlet Fantahun) were brought before the court for the third time. Police requested an additional 28 days for investigation but the court rejected the extended 28 days and asked the police to bring the detainees for the hearing on 1 June 2014, when they were brought before the court for the fourth time without apparent charge. The same court which rejected the extended 28 days request of the police two weeks earlier granted the police 28 days and the next hearing was scheduled for 29 June.

On 14 June, Atnaf Berahane, Zelalem Kibret, Natnael Feleke, Asmamaw Hailegeorgis, Tesfalem Waldyes and Edom Kassaye were brought before the court for the fourth time. Police requested and were granted an additional 28 days for investigation and the next hearing was set to be on 12 July 2014.

=== July 2014: charges ===
On 17 July, prosecutors for Ethiopia's Lideta High Court formally charged seven Zone 9 bloggers (Soliyana Shimeles (in absentia), Mahlet Fantahun, Befeqadu Hailu, Atinafu Birhane, Natinael Feleke, Zelalem Kibiret, Abel Wabela) and affiliated independent journalists (Edom Kassaye, Tesfalem Waldeyes, and Assmamaw H/Giorgis) with having connections to the outlawed opposition political organization Ginbot 7, as well as the also outlawed Oromo Liberation Front (OLF) rebel organization. The charges further allege that Natinael Feleke received a sum of 48,000 birr from Ginbot 7 for the purpose of inciting violence. The defendants had no legal representation present when the charges were issued, because their attorneys and families were not given prior notice about the hearing.

During the last hearing there was an order to amend the terrorism charges. The reason was that the charges did not specify what acts of terrorism the bloggers and journalists were alleged to have performed. Despite the order, no amendment was made to the charges, but a new point was added accusing the bloggers of wanting to change the constitutional order by violence. The bloggers were also repeatedly mentioned together with Ginbot 7, an organization banned as a terrorist network. The bloggers had been openly critical to this group and had denied all association with them. Friends and families of the bloggers were allowed to attend the trial. Also, there seemed to have been a change for the better regarding visits of the female detainees, Mahlet Fantahun and Edom Kassaye. It was reported that they now were allowed to have visitors more frequently. The trial was adjourned for the thirteenth time, and the next hearing was to take place on 16 December 2014.

=== July 2015: release of five bloggers ===
On 8 July 2015, three of the Zone 9 bloggers, Tesfalem Waldyes, Asmamaw Hailegiorgis and Zelalem Kiberet, were freed 439 days after they were sent to jail. All charges against the three men were dropped. Shortly afterwards, Mahlet Fantahun and Edom Kassaye were also freed and their charges dropped on 9 July 2015, along with Ethiopian journalist Reeyot Alemu. Their release precedes a visit by US President Barack Obama to Ethiopia for the first time, which some have speculated created pressure for the journalists to be freed.

=== October 2015: release of four more bloggers ===
On 16 October 2015 charges against four of the Zone 9 bloggers – Soliana Shimelis, Atnaf Berhane, Abel Wabella and Natnail Feleke – were dropped, and they were acquitted. The court did not acquit Befeqadu on a criminal charge of "inciting violence", and adjourned the case until five days from 16 October to decide on bail.

== Charge in Zone 9 case ==
A federal prosecutor presented a ten-page amended charge in the case of the Zone 9 bloggers and journalists which defense lawyers say had not been amended under the court's order.

The Federal High Court nineteenth criminal bench on 12 November ordered Federal Prosecutors to amend their charge to include details such as the specific act of terror the defendants are alleged to have committed and the roles and acts of each defendant.

On Wednesday the amended charge was read out in court in the presence of the nine defendants in custody. One member of the group, Soliyana Shimeles, a blogger, was charged in absentia.

The amendment specified two "Terrorist Acts" specified under Article 3 of the Anti-Terrorism proclamation. As per the amendment, the defendants are accused of causing "serious risk to the safety or health of the public or section of the public" and "serious damage to property".

"There are some changes to the original charge but we do not believe it is amended as ordered by court," Ameha Mekonnen, lawyer of eight of the defendants, said requesting the court to grant them more days to submit their written comment on the amendment.

The case was adjourned to 16 December 2014 to allow defense lawyers to submit their remark on the amended charge.

The defendants originally faced two charges of 'conspiracy to commit acts of terror' and 'outrage against the constitutional order'. However, judges dropped the latter stating that the facts constituting the alleged crime were covered under the terror charge.

The nine bloggers and journalists - Abel Wabella, Befeqadu Hailu, Atnaf Berhane, Natnael Feleke, Mahlet Fantahun, Zelalem Kibret, Tesfalem Waldyes, Edom Kassaye, and Asmamaw Hailegeorgis - had been in custody since April 2014. Edom and Mahlet, the two female defendants, had complained to court about mistreatment at the Addis Ababa Prison Administration in previous hearings. The two defendants alleged that their right to be visited was limited to a few family members and to ten minutes per day.

Speaking outside the court, Ameha said a resolution had been reached with the prison administration regarding visitation rights of suspects.

The prison administration had promised that the defendants can be visited for one hour a day and the only requirement to visit is prior registration, the lawyer has said.

"We hope things will improve. If not, we will bring it back to the attention of the court," Ameha said.

== Advocacy ==
Advocacy organizations across the world have organized campaigns and written articles to call attention to the case of the Zone 9 bloggers. International organizations like Article 19, Global Voices Advocacy, the Electronic Frontier Foundation, Human Rights Watch, and others have been engaged in advocacy efforts, largely aimed at releasing the Zone 9 bloggers and other detained journalists in Ethiopia.

Activists started a Twitter campaign in the summer of 2014 using the hashtag #FreeZone9Bloggers and also began posting pictures on Tumblr displaying support of the jailed bloggers. In May 2014 Global Voices also started a community petition with advocacy organizations from across the globe .

Also in the summer of 2014 the Zone 9 Trial Tracker blog started in an effort to translate relevant case materials into English to help with reporting and advocacy efforts.

== See also ==
- Eskinder Nega
- Human rights in Ethiopia
- Media in Ethiopia
- Internet in Ethiopia
- List of detained journalists and activists in Ethiopia (2023)
