= Human rights in Ethiopia =

According to the U.S. Department of State's human rights report for 2022, there exists "significant human rights issues" in Ethiopia. In addition to extrajudicial killings and instances of "enforced disappearance", other human right issues in Ethiopia include arbitrary arrest, the censorship and unjustified arrests of journalists, the use of child soldiers, and more.

Reports of human rights violations within the country have been levied at the federal government of Ethiopia, and by various militant groups and regional militias; including the Tigray People's Liberation Front.

== History ==
During Emperor Haile Selassie's reign, laws began to be systematically codified, allowing for the enactment of Ethiopia's first two constitutions: the Constitution of 1931 and the Revised Constitution of the Empire of Ethiopia of 1955, as well as six Codes that remain fundamental to Ethiopia's laws today. However, both the 1931 Constitution and the 1955 Constitution systematized the power of the Emperor, leaving out what rights and freedoms his subjects should possess.

After overthrowing Selassie in 1974, Major Mengistu Haile Marium established a military dictatorship that subjected its political opponents to "arbitrary arrests and detentions, torture, enforced disappearances and extra-judicial execution." Five years later, Mengistu began the Derg's planned transition to a civil government, forming a Commission for the Establishment of the Worker's Party in 1979 and declaring a socialist republic, led by the Workers Party of Ethiopia, in 1984. In 1987, the Constitution of the People's Democratic Republic of Ethiopia (PDRE Constitution) formally dissolved the Derg and inaugurated the People's Democratic Republic of Ethiopia (PDRE), a Marxist–Leninist one-party state that was dominated by the military and former Derg members. The PDRE Constitution outlined basic rights and freedoms, including freedom of speech, press, and assembly; freedom of conscience and religion; and the rights of the accused and arrested. Due to the PDRE's socialist ideology, the PDRE Constitution emphasized socioeconomic and cultural rights, such as the right to free education; the right to healthcare; and the freedom to participate in science, technology, and the arts. However, the same rights established in the PDRE Constitution were violated by Mengistu's military state.

Mengistu's authoritarian military regime faced organized opposition for all of its fourteen years of rule. Opposition groups including the Ethiopian People's Revolutionary Party (EPRP), a rival Marxist–Leninist group, and the Tigray-based Ethiopian People's Revolutionary Democratic Front, a coalition of ethnic democratic forces, led armed resistance to the Derg in a conflict known as the Ethiopian Civil War. The Derg used violence, commonly enacted through military campaigns, to suppress dissidents. In 1976, the Derg instigated the Qey Shibir (Ethiopian Red Terror), a violent political repression campaign targeting the EPRP. Under Mengistu's leadership, the Derg did not only rely on state personnel to carry out the Qey Shibir; it also armed militias and civilian supporters and granted "genuine revolutionaries and patriots" impunity, further localizing state violence. The Qey Shibir resulted in approximately 980 000 fatalities. In addition, many victims of the Qey Shibir were subjected to torture, exile, and sexual assault. The Qey Shibir and the 1983-1985 famine, an event partly created and exacerbated by the government's military policies, increased popular support for the EPRDF, which successfully overthrew Mengistu's regime in 1991.

The EPRDF took power in 1991 with the promise of a transitional program that would rehabilitate those negatively impacted by the previous regime, promote democracy, and recognize and protect human and minority group rights. The Transitional Period Charter, which was adopted during the post-war conference in 1991, officially established a transitional government. Drawing from the United Nations' Universal Declaration of Human Rights, Article 1 of the Charter guaranteed basic rights and civil liberties, specifically freedom of expression, association, and assembly; freedom of conscience; and the right to "unrestricted" political participation and party organization, "provided the exercise of such right does not infringe upon the rights of others." The Charter also addressed the state of interethnic relations in Ethiopia. Article 17 of the Charter stated that the Transitional Government of Ethiopia (TGE) would work to de-escalate ethnic conflict as it led the country toward a full democracy. Article 2 proclaimed the rights of ethnic groups in Ethiopia, which are officially referred to as nations or nationalities. Among the rights granted to all Ethiopian "nations, nationalities, and peoples" was the right to self-determination, including the right to secede.

In 1994, the EPRDF adopted the Constitution of the Federal Democratic Republic of Ethiopia, which came into effect following the 1995 general election. Following the blueprint laid out by the Transitional Period Charter, the 1995 Constitution established an ethnic federal system. Like the Charter, the 1995 Constitution draws from the Universal Declaration of Human Rights while also establishing protections of group rights. Articles 14 through 44 of the 1995 Constitution codify "fundamental rights and freedoms," with Articles 14 through 28 pertaining to "human rights" and articles 29 through 44 establishing "democratic rights."

In April 2018, Abiy Ahmed became Prime Minister and promised multiple reforms in terms of human rights. In 2018, his government freed thousands of political prisoners, lifted the state of emergency, ended the Eritrean–Ethiopian border conflict, selected a new cabinet among which half the ministers were women, and appointed a woman judge, Birtukan Mideksa, as the head of the National Election Board of Ethiopia (NEBE).

== Anti-Terrorism Proclamation ==
Ethiopia's Anti-Terrorism Proclamation was introduced in 2009. The broad provisions of the Anti-Terrorism Proclamation allow the authorities to criminalize the exercise of freedom of expression. Amnesty International believes that at least 108 journalists and opposition members were arrested in 2011 primarily because of their legitimate and peaceful criticism of the government. The sheer numbers involved in this wave of arrests represents the most far-reaching crackdown on freedom of expression seen in many years in Ethiopia.

From March 2011 to December 2011 at least 108 opposition party members and six journalists were arrested in Ethiopia for alleged involvement with various proscribed terrorist groups. The detainees had been charged with crimes under the Anti-Terrorism Proclamation and the Criminal Code. Many arrests in 2011 came in the days immediately after individuals publicly criticized the government, were involved in public calls for reform, applied for permission to hold demonstrations, or attempted to conduct investigative journalism in a region of Ethiopia to which the government severely restricts access.

Amnesty International believes the individuals will not receive a fair trial and will be convicted for exercising their right to freedom of expression. Many of the detainees complained that they experienced torture and were forced to sign confessions or incriminating evidence. Almost all were denied access to lawyers and family at the start of detention.

The trials have become deeply politicized owing to the interest of senior government officials including the Prime Minister who declared in the national parliament that all the defendants are guilty. The Prime Minister has publicly threatened to carry out further arrests. In the first week of December 135 people were reported to be arrested in Oromia. Amnesty International calls on the United Nations, European Union, African Union, and governments to: Conduct systematic monitoring of the ongoing terrorism trials and the trials of members of the Oromo people political opposition arrested during 2011 and make findings public.

== Political freedom ==
Two journalists and four opposition politicians of the Unity for Democracy and Justice (UDJ) party, and the Ethiopian National Democratic party, were arrested on 14 September and on 9 September 2011. They were accused of involvement with the Ginbot 7 group, a banned political party.

=== Elections ===
According to Amnesty International citizens were pressured to leave opposition parties in May 2010 elections. Voters in Addis Ababa were reportedly threatened with the withdrawal of state assistance if they did not vote for the EPRDF. There was political violence: One candidate and several activists were killed. Registration as candidates was reportedly prevented by armed forces. Opposition parties said that their members were harassed, beaten, and detained by the EPRDF in the build-up to the elections. Hundreds of people were allegedly arrested arbitrarily in the Oromia region, often on the grounds of supporting the (OLF), an armed group. Detention without trial, torture and killings of Oromos were reported.

The Ethiopian People's Revolutionary Democratic Front (EPRDF) consolidated political control with 99.6 percent victory in the May 2010 parliamentary elections. According to Human Rights Watch the polls were preceded by months of intimidation of opposition party supporters. According to European election observers, the election fell short of international standards. The government had a five-year strategy to systematically close down space for political dissent and independent criticism.

== Freedom of the press ==
The Universal Declaration of Human Rights Article 19 of the freedom of expression states: Everyone has the right to freedom of opinion and expression; this right includes freedom to hold opinions without interference and to seek, receive and impart information and ideas through any media and regardless of frontiers.

=== 1991–2018: EPRDF ===
According to Reporters Without Borders Ethiopia was 139 out of 178 in its latest worldwide index in January 2012. Freedom House stated in 2007 that citizens had little access to media other than the state-owned networks, and most private newspapers struggled to remain open and suffered periodic harassment from the government.

Government censorship, harassment and arrest of bloggers and journalists severely restricts freedom of the press in Ethiopia:

- Between 2005 and 2007, at least 18 journalists who had written articles critical of the government, were arrested on genocide and treason charges. The government used press laws governing libel to intimidate journalists who were critical of its policies. Authorities used concerns over insurgency and terrorism to use torture, imprisonment, and other repressive methods to silence critics following the election, particularly people sympathetic to the registered opposition party Oromo National Congress (ONC).
- In December 2009, Martin Schibbye and Johan Persson were convicted for "rendering support to terrorism" and entering the country illegally "to commit an act that is a threat to the well-being of the people of Ethiopia." Status:Pardoned
- In 2011, Hellman-Hammett Award winner Woubshet Taye Abebe was arrested. He was charged under the anti-terrorism law. Before his arrest, he was the deputy editor of the Awramba Times. Status: In prison
- In 2012, Reeyot Alemu Gobebo, a journalist for Feteh, was convicted on three counts under the terrorism law and initially sentenced to 14 years in prison. This sentence was reduced to 5 years on appeal. Status: In prison.
- In 2012 PEN/Barbara Goldsmith Freedom to Write Award recipient Eskinder Nega was arrested under terrorism charges for his reporting on the Arab Spring;
- In 2014 six members of the Zone 9 blogging collective were arrested under terrorism charges related to their reporting and use of online encryption tools.
- Habtamu Ayalew and other opposition leaders were also imprisoned and tortured from July 2014 to late 2015.

All of the above individuals were held at the Kaliti Prison.

=== 2018–present: Abiy Ahmed ===
During the Abiy Ahmed prime ministership that started in April 2018, thousands of political prisoners were released in May 2018. The rate of imprisonment of journalists during Abiy's first year of power dropped for the first time since 2004. In April 2019, the media remained reluctant to criticize the government out of fear of punishment. From May 2019 to December 2020, Addis Standard counted 33 detentions of journalists. Most were released on bail, some without charges. The longest detention prior to bail among those listed was that of Kenyan freelance journalist Yassin Juma, who was detained for 49 days, accused of "inciting ethnic violence and plotting to kill senior Ethiopian officials".

On 27 March 2020, Ethiopian police arrested journalist Yayesew Shimelis following his report about the COVID-19 pandemic. Following court orders to release him, police added additional charges, including terrorism charges. The Committee to Protect Journalists called the new accusations "dubious", and the One Free Press Coalition highlighted him in its May 2020 list of "10 Most Urgent" list of journalists under attack.

== Freedom of association ==
=== Protesters ===
In 2005, the Ethiopian Police Massacre took place. In this, it was claimed that the Ethiopian police massacred almost 200 opposition protesters, who were protesting in response to the May 2005 General Elections. During this, live gunfire from government forces was directed at protesters and bystanders.

=== Civil society ===
On 6 January 2009, the Ethiopian parliament passed the "Charities and Societies Proclamation (NGO law)", which "criminalizes most human rights work in the country" according to HRW, who added that "the law is a direct rebuke to governments that assist Ethiopia and that had expressed concerns about the law's restrictions on freedom of association and expression." The Charities and Societies Proclamation No. 621/2009 of Ethiopia (Civil Society Law or CSO law) was enacted on 6 January 2009. The 2009 CSO law was part of the many measures behind the government's post-2005 authoritarian turn and sought to and to some degree succeeded in either dominating independent civil society or replacing them with Government Owned Non-Governmental Organizations (GONGOs).

According to a paper by the Center for International Human Rights at Northwestern University School of Law, "The CSO law is the product of the Ethiopian government's deep suspicion of civil society" and has been frequently used to silence any organization that advocates for human rights in Ethiopia. This law is more draconian than a similar Russian law and is most similar to a draft of a Zimbabwean NGO bill that was never signed into law. Research indicates that Ethiopia's CSO law is among the most restrictive in the world.

This law prohibits "foreign" NGO's from engaging in a very wide range of activities including human rights, women's rights, children's rights, disability rights, citizenship rights, conflict resolution or democratic governance. The definition of "foreign" NGO was broadened to include local NGOs that receive more than ten percent of their funding from foreign sources. Given that most local NGO's cannot sustain themselves without some foreign funding, this definition is broad enough to include almost all NGO's in Ethiopia. However, the government of Ethiopia itself receives 50 to 60 percent of its national budget from foreign governments, which according to its own definition would clearly make it a foreign entity as well.

Over the years Ethiopian organizations that have found themselves to be targets of harassment using the CSO Law include the Ethiopian Human Rights Council (EHRCO), the Ethiopian Women Lawyers Association (EWLA) which provided pro bono service to Ethiopian women who could not afford a lawyer. Despite the fact that Article 31 of the Ethiopian Constitution provides that "every person has the right to freedom of association for any cause or purpose", the prohibition of NGO's by the CSO Law has had the effect of severely restricting citizens' right of association, as members of NGO's can not associate freely.

== Electronic communications ==
In 2012, Ethiopia passed a law that criminalizes providing Internet voice communication (VoIP) and requiring inspection of any imported voice communications equipment. Additionally, it prohibits "bypasses the telecom infrastructure established by the telecom service provider", which restricts Internet access to only the ETC.

According to Freedom House's Freedom on the Net 2013 report, Ethiopia ranked 56th out of 60 countries on Internet freedom and 47th out of 53 in 2012.

In October 2016, many Ethiopians protested against the government after they prohibited use of social media, and banned several television channels. As a result, hundreds of people were killed and hundreds more imprisoned.

=== Algorithmic content distribution ===
In 2025, Meta faced a $2.4 billion lawsuit for allegedly inflaming violence in Ethiopia through its algorithmic content distribution on Facebook. The lawsuit, filed by two Ethiopian nationals, accuses Meta of promoting hateful content and incitement to violence, and calls for changes to its algorithm and increased content moderation in Africa. The case was brought by the son of a murdered academic and a former Amnesty International researcher who received death threats on the platform. The Kenyan High Court ruled that the case could proceed in Kenyan courts. In 2022, investigations found Facebook had allowed hate speech to spread in Ethiopia, exacerbating violence, especially during the Tigray conflict. Meta denied the claims but later reduced censorship and fact-checking on the platform.

== Women's rights ==
According to surveys in 2003 by the National Committee on Traditional Practices in Ethiopia, marriage by abduction accounts for 69% of the nation's marriages, with around 80% in the largest region, Oromia, and as high as 92 percent in the Southern Nations, Nationalities, and People's Region.

On 9 November 2021, the Human Rights Watch reported that the blocking of Tigray aid by the Ethiopian government, along with health facilities in Ethiopia's northern Tigray region destroyed, is preventing sexual violence survivors from obtaining essential care. The report named "I Always Remember That Day: Access to Services for Gender-Based Violence Survivors in Ethiopia's Tigray Region," documents the serious health impact, trauma, and stigma experienced by rape survivors since the beginning of the armed conflict in Tigray.

=== Female genital mutilation ===
According to the 2005 Ethiopian Demographic Health Survey, more than 74% of women between the ages of 15 and 49 have undergone some form of genital mutilation and cutting with more than 97% in the Somali Region.

== Disability rights ==
Among certain Omotic Karo and Hamar communities in southern Ethiopia, adults and children with physical abnormalities are considered to be mingi, "ritually impure". The latter are believed to exert an evil influence upon others; disabled infants have traditionally been murdered without a proper burial. The Karo officially banned the practice in July 2012.

== Ethnic violence ==
=== Violence against Oromo people ===
A nationwide series of violent protests, concentrated in the Oromia Region, broke out starting on 23 October 2019, sparked by activist and media owner Jawar Mohammed's allegation that security forces had attempted to detain him. According to official reports, 86 people were killed. On 29 May 2020, Amnesty International released a report accusing the security forces of Ethiopia of mass detentions and extrajudicial killings. The report stated that in 2019, at least 25 people, suspected of supporting the Oromo Liberation Army, were killed by the forces in parts of the Oromia Region. Between January and September 2019, at least 10,000 people were detained under suspicion, where most were "subjected to brutal beatings".

=== Ethnic conflict in the Southern regions ===
==== Other violence in Gedeo and neighboring Woredas ====
Ethnic violence in the south between Oromo, the largest ethnic group in the country, and the Gedeo and, in the east, between the Oromo and the Somalis led to Ethiopia having the largest number of people to flee their homes in the world in 2018. About 1.4 million refugees fled their homes in Ethiopia in 2018. The largest number were from the Gedeo–Oromo clashes, where about 800,000 mostly ethnic Gedeos fled the district of West Guji in Oromia, a higher number and over a shorter period of time, than occurred at the height of Myanmar's Rohingya crisis the year before. The government pressures the refugees to return to their homes even though they fear for their lives, often by denying refugees access to humanitarian aid.

==== The violence against the Anuak people in Gambela ====
Gambela Region has a population of 307,000, mainly indigenous Anuak and Nuer. Its richly fertile soil has attracted foreign and domestic investors who have leased large tracts of land at favorable prices. From 2008 through January 2011, Ethiopia leased out at least 3.6 million hectares of land, an area the size of the Netherlands. An additional 2.1 million hectares of land is available through the federal government's land bank for agricultural investment. In Gambella, 42 percent of the land is marketed for investors. A similar 2012 report by Human Rights Watch also describes the Ethiopian government's 2010–2011 villagization program in Gambela, with plans to carry out similar resettlements in other regions.

In 2013, the Oakland Institute released a report accusing the Ethiopian government of forcing the relocation of "hundreds of thousands of indigenous people from their lands" in the Gambela Region. According to several reports by the organization, those who refused were the subject of a variety of intimidation techniques including physical and sexual abuse, which sometimes led to deaths.

The Ethiopian government has denied the accusations of land grabbing and instead pointed to the positive trajectory of the country's economy as evidence of the development program's benefits.

== LGBT rights ==
Homosexual acts are illegal in Ethiopia. According to Criminal Code Article 629, same-sex activity is punished up to 15 years to life in prison. Ethiopia has been a socially conservative country. The majority of people are hostile towards LGBT people and persecution is commonplace on the grounds of religious and societal norms. Homosexuality came to light in the country after the failed 2008 appeal to the Council of Ministers, and the LGBT scene began to thrive slightly in major metropolitan locations, such as Addis Ababa. Some notable hotels like Sheraton Addis and Hilton Hotel became hotbeds of accusations for alleged lobbying.

The Ethiopian Orthodox Church plays a frontal role in opposition; some of its members formed anti-gay organizations. For example, Dereje Negash, one prominent activist, founded "Zim Anlem" in 2014, which is a traditionalism and anti-gender movement. According to the 2007 Pew Global Attitudes Project, 97 percent of Ethiopians believe homosexuality is a way of life that society should not accept. This was the second-highest rate of non-acceptance in the 45 countries surveyed.

== Law enforcement ==
Police force unlawful use of force has become a recent phenomena in Ethiopia. During the Derg regime, the security sector had a primary role to repress opposition groups and rebel rivals. There have also been sightings of abusing the local population. The violation also existed during the EPRDF era; in the protest of the 2005 general election, 193 people were killed by police forces initiated by government crackdown. In Article 52 of the Constitution, the Federal Police was obligated to administer state police force and maintain public order and peace within the state.

Police brutality reappeared during Abiy Ahmed tenure. On 26 August 2019, a video of a handcuffed man beaten by two officers went viral on Twitter, with many shared outrage against the government administration.

=== Incidents ===
According to a report released by Human Rights Watch (HRW) in June 2008, the Ethiopian army has committed widespread executions, torture and rape in Ogaden, as part of a counterinsurgency campaign. The Ethiopian Ministry of Foreign Affairs responded with a big press release stating that they performed an investigation during August and September of that year, which "found no trace of serious human rights violation let alone war crimes or crimes against humanity" during their response to the Abole oil field raid, but claimed the investigation found "a mass of evidence of further systematic abuses committed by the ONLF." However, the U.S. State Department's annual report on human rights notes that Lisan Yohannes, a "former ruling party insider", led the investigation, an appointment which "opens questions about the independence of the investigation."

Following the State of Emergency declared in 2016, there were reports of thousands of deaths of citizens. After protests in Oromo, Amhara, and the Southern Nations, Nationalities, and People's region, The Ethiopian Human Rights Council reported that there were 669 deaths on aggregate. According to other NGOs and Oromo region officials, there were hundreds of deaths due to militia groups in the eastern side of Ethiopia.

On 30 June 2020, Amnesty International called upon the Ethiopian authorities to thoroughly and impartially investigate the 29 June killing of popular Oromo singer Hachalu Hundessa.

=== Detention centers ===
In a 2017 HRCO report, detention centers in Ethiopia came under scrutiny. The prisons are overcrowded, for example a prison in Asella has a capacity of 400 people, but holds 3000 detainees. The prisoners were beaten and some killed, like Ayele Beyene in Kilinto who was beaten by guards and then his wounds were ignored which eventually led to his death. Once people are placed in the prison system their families have little knowledge of their whereabouts. Detainees in some places cannot receive visitors and there is no database or organization to find the location of prisoners.

In the 2017 HRCO report, the conditions of the Finote Selam Prison in Amhara, the Awash Arba Prison, and Kilinto Prison, were revealed. In the Finote Selam Prison the reports indicated the detainees were beaten and tortured, and the Amahara and Oromo ethnicities were given worse treatment than other groups. Detainees were also subjected to spend time immersed in latrine pits of human feces. In the Awash Arba Prison, they were overcrowded, unfed, beaten, and forced to do manual labor. In addition, the detainees spent time outside walking barefoot and sitting in the sun for consecutive days. In Kilinto, the prisoners were forced to give confessions at the threat of physical punishment, while being mistreated.

In 2018, under the new leadership of Prime Minister Abiy Ahmed, the Ethiopian Government closed Jail Ogaden in the Somali Region of Ethiopia. Jail Ogaden was operated under the former leader of the Somali Region, Abdi Mohamoud Omar, with many of the imprisoned there without charges against them. A Human Rights Watch report indicates that the prisoners were malnourished, beaten, and kept in small confines that promoted rampant disease spread. The former head of the prison Shamaahiye Sheikh Farah was arrested in September 2018 for his role in the prison. Shamaahiye's most infamous incident of torture was having a month of hunger, where none of the prisoners were allowed to eat.

== Historical situation ==
The following chart shows Ethiopia's ratings from 1972 to 2011 in the Freedom in the World reports, published annually by Freedom House. A rating of 1 is "free"; 7, "not free".^{1}

Historical ratings

Year	Political Rights	Civil Liberties	Status	Ruler/President^{2}
1972	5	6	Not Free	Haile Selassie I
1973	5	6	Partly Free	Haile Selassie I
1974	6	5	Not Free	Haile Selassie I
1975	7	6	Not Free	Tafari Benti
1976	7	6	Not Free	Tafari Benti
1977	7	7	Not Free	Tafari Benti
1978	7	7	Not Free	Mengistu Haile Mariam
1979	7	7	Not Free	Mengistu Haile Mariam
1980	7	7	Not Free	Mengistu Haile Mariam
1981	7	7	Not Free	Mengistu Haile Mariam
1982^{3}	7	7	Not Free	Mengistu Haile Mariam
1983	7	7	Not Free	Mengistu Haile Mariam
1984	7	7	Not Free	Mengistu Haile Mariam
1985	7	7	Not Free	Mengistu Haile Mariam
1986	7	7	Not Free	Mengistu Haile Mariam
1987	6	7	Not Free	Mengistu Haile Mariam
1988	6	7	Not Free	Mengistu Haile Mariam
1989	7	7	Not Free	Mengistu Haile Mariam
1990	7	7	Not Free	Mengistu Haile Mariam
1991	6	5	Partly Free	Mengistu Haile Mariam
1992	6	4	Partly Free	Meles Zenawi
1993	6	5	Partly Free	Meles Zenawi
1994	6	5	Not Free	Meles Zenawi
1995	4	5	Partly Free	Meles Zenawi
1996	4	5	Partly Free	Negasso Gidada
1997	4	5	Partly Free	Negasso Gidada
1998	4	4	Partly Free	Negasso Gidada
1999	5	5	Partly Free	Negasso Gidada
2000	5	5	Partly Free	Negasso Gidada
2001	5	5	Partly Free	Negasso Gidada
2002	5	5	Partly Free	Girma Wolde-Giorgis
2003	5	5	Partly Free	Girma Wolde-Giorgis
2004	5	5	Partly Free	Girma Wolde-Giorgis
2005	5	5	Partly Free	Girma Wolde-Giorgis
2006	5	5	Partly Free	Girma Wolde-Giorgis
2007	5	5	Partly Free	Girma Wolde-Giorgis
2008	5	5	Partly Free	Girma Wolde-Giorgis
2009	5	5	Partly Free	Girma Wolde-Giorgis
2010	6	6	Not Free	Girma Wolde-Giorgis
2011	6	6	Not Free	Girma Wolde-Giorgis

Report from Freedom of the World since 2017
Historical ratings

Year	Political Rights	Civil Liberties	Status	Ruler/President^{2}
2017	4	8	Not Free	Mulatu Teshome
2018	4	8	Not Free	Sahle-Work Zewde
2019	7	12	Not Free	Sahle-Work Zewde
2020	10	14	Not Free	Sahle-Work Zewde
2021	9	13	Not Free	Sahle-Work Zewde
2022	12	11	Not Free	Sahle-Work Zewde

== International treaties ==
Ethiopia's stances on international human rights treaties are as follows:

International treaties

Treaty	Organization	Introduced	Signed	Ratified
Convention on the Prevention and Punishment of the Crime of Genocide	United Nations	1948	1948	1949
International Convention on the Elimination of All Forms of Racial Discrimination	United Nations	1966	-	1976
International Covenant on Economic, Social and Cultural Rights	United Nations	1966	-	1993
International Covenant on Civil and Political Rights	United Nations	1966	-	1993
First Optional Protocol to the International Covenant on Civil and Political Rights	United Nations	1966	-	-
Convention on the Non-Applicability of Statutory Limitations to War Crimes and Crimes Against Humanity	United Nations	1968	-	-
International Convention on the Suppression and Punishment of the Crime of Apartheid	United Nations	1973	-	1978
Convention on the Elimination of All Forms of Discrimination against Women	United Nations	1979	1980	1981
Convention against Torture and Other Cruel, Inhuman or Degrading Treatment or Punishment	United Nations	1984	-	1994
Convention on the Rights of the Child	United Nations	1989	-	1991
Second Optional Protocol to the International Covenant on Civil and Political Rights, aiming at the abolition of the death penalty	United Nations	1989	-	-
International Convention on the Protection of the Rights of All Migrant Workers and Members of Their Families	United Nations	1990	-	-
Optional Protocol to the Convention on the Elimination of All Forms of Discrimination against Women	United Nations	1999	-	-
Optional Protocol to the Convention on the Rights of the Child on the Involvement of Children in Armed Conflict	United Nations	2000	2010	-
Optional Protocol to the Convention on the Rights of the Child on the Sale of Children, Child Prostitution and Child Pornography	United Nations	2000	-	-
Convention on the Rights of Persons with Disabilities	United Nations	2006	2007	2010
Optional Protocol to the Convention on the Rights of Persons with Disabilities	United Nations	2006	-	-
International Convention for the Protection of All Persons from Enforced Disappearance	United Nations	2006	-	-
Optional Protocol to the International Covenant on Economic, Social and Cultural Rights	United Nations	2008	-	-
Optional Protocol to the Convention on the Rights of the Child on a Communications Procedure	United Nations	2011	-	-

== See also ==
- Ethiopian Judicial Authority v Swedish journalists 2011
- Human trafficking in Ethiopia
- Internet in Ethiopia#Censorship
- Kaliti Prison, a notorious prison where numerous journalists are held
- LGBT rights in Ethiopia
- Politics of Ethiopia
- Woineshet Zebene
- Yegna, feminist pop group
- List of detained journalists and activists in Ethiopia (2023)
- Tigray War
  - War crimes in the Tigray War
  - Sexual violence in the Tigray War
  - Famine in northern Ethiopia (2020–present)
- Fundamental rights in Ethiopia

== Notes ==
1.Note that the "Year" signifies the "Year covered". Therefore, the information for the year marked 2008 is from the report published in 2009, and so on.
2.As of 1 January.
3.The 1982 report covers the year 1981 and the first half of 1982, and the following 1984 report covers the second half of 1982 and the whole of 1983. In the interest of simplicity, these two aberrant "year and a half" reports have been split into three-year-long reports through interpolation.
