= EJF =

EJF may refer to:

- Environmental Justice Foundation, an international environmental organization
- Ethiopian Journalists Forum
- European Jewish Fund
