= Zone 9 =

Zone 9 may refer to:

- London fare zone 9, of the Transport for London zonal system
- Hardiness zone, a geographically defined zone in which a specific category of plant life is capable of growing
- Zone 9 of Milan
- Zone 9 bloggers, a blogging group from Ethiopia
