= Meseret Mamo =

Ethiopian public official

- Born: Ethiopia
- Occupations: Commissioner for Women and Children Affairs

Meseret Mamo is an Ethiopian politician who served as a Commissioner on the national commission for women and children’s affairs. She was reappointed by the Ethiopian House of Peoples’ Representatives in 2018 as Commissioner to the Children and Women Affairs Commission.

== Career ==
Mamo served as a Commissioner to the Children and Women Affairs Commission from 2010 to 2013. She was reappointed on July 7, 2018. Her role involves oversight and advocacy on issues related to the protection and promotion of the rights of women and children in Ethiopia.

== See also ==
- Human rights in Ethiopia
