= Ethiopian Judicial Authority v Swedish journalists 2011 =

Legal proceedings against journalists

Ethiopian judicial authority v Swedish journalists 2011 was about the legal proceedings relating to claims that Swedish journalists Johan Persson and Martin Schibbye were supporting terrorism in Ethiopia. Relations between Sweden and Ethiopia were seriously affected by this case. In 2011, Ethiopia was claimed to detain more than 150 innocent people, including reporters. Johan Persson and Martin Schibbye were released in September 2012 as part of a mass pardon, and returned home to Sweden.

The European Union (EU) raised concerns about freedom of media in Ethiopia as a result of the case. Both the EU and the United States (U.S.) also said they were concerned by the case. According to Sweden's State Secretary for Foreign Affairs, Sweden kept up efforts to free the two men by contacting Ethiopian ministers and consulting with the U.S. and the EU.

Swedish Foreign Minister Carl Bildt met Johan Persson and Martin Schibbye, and eventually also Prime Minister Meles Zenawi, in Ethiopia in May 2012. Criticism expressed that Bildt did not put sufficient pressure on the Ethiopian government to release Schibbye and Persson.

== Arrest and court ==
In July 2011, two Swedish journalists were captured by Ethiopian troops in the Ogaden during a clash with ONLF. Swedish journalist Martin Schibbye and Swedish photographer Johan Persson were arrested in Ethiopia. They admitted illegal entry from Somalia to the Ogaden. Ethiopian troops captured Persson, 29, and Schibbye, 31. They were detained during a clash with rebels in Ogaden, eastern Ethiopia's ethnic Somali region, where there has been a fight for independence since the 1970s. They were wounded in a security operation which killed 15 rebels.

On 27 December 2011, a court in Ethiopia sentenced the Swedish journalists to 11 years in prison on charges of supporting terrorism after they illegally entered the country with Somalis. No phone calls or letters were allowed by relatives. Shibbi's mother was allowed to visit her in prison at the request of the Swedish Embassy. The two journalists were incarcerated in Kaliti Prison.

== Work ==
According to the journalists, they investigated alleged human rights abuses in a region, the Ethiopian authorities will not allow journalists to enter. Ethiopia recently designated the ONLF as a terrorist organisation. Schibbye and Persson were gathering news about a Swedish oil company exploring oil in the region for a Swedish reportage magazine. Persson had heard claims from refugees in the Dadaab camp in Kenya about Ogaden's oilfields. They wanted to go to Ogaden to check if the claims were correct.

They were in the region to investigate activities in the Ogaden of an oil explorer which in 2009 bought licenses in Ethiopia from Lundin Petroleum.

Sweden's Foreign Minister Carl Bildt was a board member of Lundin Oil and its successor Lundin Petroleum between 2000 and 2006. According to Reuters Swedish media have questioned whether Bildt has a conflict of interest in the case. Oil company had activities in the Ogaden and Darfur. According to Reuters Lundin was accused in one of the European Coalition on Oil in Sudan report of being complicit in the commission of war crimes and crimes against humanity in that country between 1997 and 2003. The European Coalition on Oil in Sudan (ECOS) was established in 2000 by eighty European NGOs. The Swedish Prosecution Authority launched a preliminary investigation into the allegations in 2010.

== ONLF ==
According to Reuters the U.N. called for an independent investigation into allegations of human rights abuses by Ethiopian forces in the Ogaden region already some years ago. There was an offensive in late 2007 related to Chinese-run oil facility. Large parts of the region was inaccessible to outside agencies by Ethiopian troops in 2007. Ethiopia says the Ogaden basin may contain 4tn cubic feet of natural gas and major oil deposits. The rebels have warned of attacks against foreign firms working in the region. Now the ONLF Ogaden National Liberation Front is blacklisted as a terrorist group. ONLF has been fighting to make the region of Ogaden in eastern Ethiopia an independent state.

== Other cases ==
Ethiopia sentenced three other reporters and two opposition leaders in prison in the end of January 2012: Ethiopian Review Internet editor Elias Kifle (life sentence, not present in court), Awramba Times –weekly magazine editor Wubshet Taye (14 years) and Feteh weekly magazine editor Reeyot Alemu (14 years). Two opposition politicians received 17 years and 19 years prison judges. Amnesty insisted on their immediate release.

== Critics ==
Amnesty International called for the pair to be released immediately and unconditionally. There was nothing to suggest that the men entered Ethiopia with any intention other than conducting their legitimate work as journalists.

EU raised concerns about freedom of media in Ethiopia. Both the European Union (EU) and the United States (U.S.) also said that they were concerned by the case. Sweden kept up efforts to free the two men by contacting Ethiopian ministers and consulting with the U.S. and the EU.

== Pardon in 2012 ==
Ethiopia pardoned some 1,900 prisoners in 2012 who were released in September 2012. The two Swedish journalists were part of the group. The government source said the pardon was approved before Prime Minister Meles Zenawi's death on August 20, 2012. Addis Ababa often grants mass pardons and announces the decisions ahead of major holidays, in particular the Ethiopian New Year which is celebrated on September 11.

== See also ==
- Somali Civil War
- Human rights in Ethiopia
