= Reeyot Alemu =

Ethiopian journalist

- Born: 16 April 1980 (age 45); Addis Ababa, Ethiopia
- Scientific career
- Fields: Journalism

Reeyot Alemu is an Ethiopian journalist who served a 5-year prison sentence following an unfair trial in which anti-terrorism laws were used to silence her writing. She won the UNESCO/Guillermo Cano World Press Freedom Prize in 2013.

== Biography ==
Reeyot Alemu was born in 1980. She was a high school teacher until 2000, when she started working as a columnist for several local newspapers including the independent weekly newspaper Feteh. In 2010, she founded her own publishing house and became the editor in chief of her own monthly magazine called Change, both of which were closed. Her articles covered social and political affairs as well as poverty and gender issues.

In June 2011, she was arrested by Ethiopian authorities on charges of terrorism, for which she was convicted and sentenced to 14 years of imprisonment and a fine of 33,000 birrs (US$1,850).

In August 2012, an appeals court subsequently reduced the 14-year prison sentence to 5 years and dropped most of the terrorism charges against her. She was serving a five-year term at Kaliti Prison.

Reeyot was released on July 9, 2015, after serving four years.

== Awards ==
In 2012, the International Women's Media Foundation (IWMF) bestowed a Courage in Journalism Award on her in absentia for her “refusal to self-censor in a place where that practice is standard, and her unwillingness to apologize for truth-telling, even though contrition could win her freedom.” She has also won Hellman/Hammett press freedom prize.

In May 2013, she was awarded the UNESCO/Guillermo Cano World Press Freedom Prize to honor her exceptional courage, resistance and commitment to freedom of expression.

== See also ==
- Andualem Aragie
- Eskinder Nega
- Daniel Bekele
- Arena Tigray
- Bekele Gerba
- Habtamu Ayalew
- Temesgen Desalegn
- List of detained journalists and activists in Ethiopia (2023)
