= Terrorism in Ethiopia =

In July 2009, Ethiopia passed Anti-Terrorism Legislation to counter insurgencies and terror acts. The legislation is heavily criticized by opponents who argued the legislation is a cornerstone for government to initiate crackdowns and jailing opposition leaders and dissents. Proponents defended that the law combats terrorist acts in the country in accordance with the United Nations Security Council resolution 1373 (2001). The Ethiopian government often used to justify political repressions by limiting freedom of expression wherein many journalists and critics jailed for many years. In addition, the EPRDF regime used to dismantle propaganda against certain political parties such as the Oromo Liberation Front (OLF), which was designated as terrorist group until 2018.

An act of terrorism is manifested through the armed rebellion of Al-Shabaab since War in Somalia. Al-Shebaab has been fighting the Ethiopian security forces since the late 2000s. Al-Shabaab made major incursion to the Ethiopia's Somali Region in July 2022 which killed 17 people including three civilians and Ethiopian police officers inside Somali territory and 63 of its fighters.

== Domestic terrorism ==
In July 2009, Ethiopia passed anti-terrorism law which has been subjected to criticism and accusations. A debate regarding the implementation of the law was held in August 2013 whether the law was strictly promulgated for deliberate. Proponent argued that the law counters dangerous terrorist situations in the country in line with Ethiopia's requirement to the United Nations Security Council resolution 1373 (2001). Opponents argued the implementation would bring an opportunity for government to initiate crackdowns and jailing opposition leaders and dissents. It has raised a concern of justifying an oppression through limiting freedom of expression and press. Fetah weekly newspaper editors Woubshet Taye, Reyot Alemu, Zerihun Gebre-Egzabher was arrested by Addis Ababa Police in June 2011 for alleged terrorist act. Following their arrest, police searched their homes, documents and equipment were reportedly confiscated, including copies of their respective newspapers. On 2 January 2020, lawmakers adopted the Anti-Terror Legislation as human rights groups called it ineffective reform from the previous one. Amnesty International highlighted that the new law failed to protect government critics from crackdown.

In 2011, the Oromo Liberation Front (OLF) was designated as terrorist group by the former EPRDF government. Following Abiy Ahmed's premiership, the Ethiopian parliament delisted OLF, alongside ONLF and Ginbot 7 from terrorist organization database on 5 July 2018. A ceasefire agreement took place on 7 August 2018 between the government and OLF leaders in Asmara, leading up to the formation of Oromo Liberation Army (OLA), an armed resistance movement that dissatisfied by the signatory term of disarming its members. In August 2020, the OLA announced that they forged alliance with TPLF – which opposed the central government at that time – fought the Tigray War. OLA has been designated as a terrorist group in May 2021 by the Parliament following the war.

== War in Somalia ==
In December 2006, Ethiopia invaded Somalia to oust the Islamic Courts Union (ICU). An armed engagement occurred as a result of Ethiopian military occupation between the Islamic militant groups and the Ethiopian National Defense Force (ENDF) peacekeepers in the next two years, leading to the formation of Al-Shabaab, serving as the wing of ICU. Hence, when most members of ICU fled to neighboring countries, the militant began retreating to south, organizing guerilla tactics, bombing and assassinating the Ethiopian forces.

Al-Shabaab invaded the Somali Region of Ethiopia on 20 July 2022 during the Tigray War as the militant taking advantage from the war in order to establish its province in southern Ethiopia. it raided to Yeed and Aato villages in Somalia's Bakool region, killing 17 people including three civilians and Ethiopian police officers inside Somali territory while 63 of its fighters were killed. In June 2023, Ethiopia's Foreign Ministry said they thwarted al-Shabab operation in Dollo town near Ethiopia-Somalia border.
