= Desalegn =

Desalegn (Amharic: ደሳለኝ) is an Ethiopian surname that may refer to

- Betlhem Desalegn (born 1991), an Ethiopian-born Emirati middle-distance runner
- Hailemariam Desalegn (born 1965), an Ethiopian politician
- Temesgen Desalegn, an Ethiopian journalist
