= Centre for Advancement of Rights and Democracy =

- Formation: 2019
- Type: Non-governmental organization Non-profit origination
- Headquarters: Addis Ababa, Ethiopia
- Executive Chairman: Cherer Aklilu
- Website: cardeth.org

The Centre for Advancement of Rights and Democracy (CARD) is an Ethiopian non-governmental, non-profit organization based in Addis Ababa. Established in 2019, CARD works to promote human rights, democratic principles, and the rule of law in Ethiopia through advocacy, research, and capacity building. The organization is particularly noted for its work on monitoring digital rights, freedom of expression, and the implementation of controversial legislation such as Ethiopia's Hate Speech and Disinformation Prevention and Suppression Proclamation.

== History and mission ==
CARD was co-founded in 2019 by Befekadu Hailu, Addisalem Gobena and Atnafu Brhane with the aim of the advancement of civic, media, and digital space to cultivate democratic mass culture in Ethiopia, this is done through Digital Rights Advocacy, Research and Reporting, and Civic and Voter Education.
