= Andualem Aragie =

Ethiopian politician (born 1972)

- አንዷለም አራጌ

Vice President and Press Secretary for the Unity for Democracy and Justice Party
- In office 2009–2011
- Preceded by: position established
- Succeeded by: Gizachew Shiferaw

Personal details
- Born: 4 November 1972 (age 53) Debre Tabor, Gondar Province, Ethiopian Empire
- Children: Nolawi Andualem; Ruh Andualem
- Parent(s): Aragie Wale (father); Kassanesh Gebeyehu (mother)

Andualem Aragie (Amharic: አንዱዓለም አራጌ; born 4 November 1972) is an Ethiopian politician and activist who is the Deputy Leader of Ethiopian Citizens for Social Justice (ECSJ), an opposition party formed after the merger of 7 smaller opposition parties in May 2019. He was formerly the vice president and press secretary for the Ethiopian-based Unity for Democracy and Justice Party (UDJP). Andualem was sentenced to a life sentence on terrorism charges after being imprisoned on September 14, 2011 along with prominent journalist Eskinder Nega and opposition party members and reporters. His arrest has been ascribed by human rights organizations as a crackdown on dissent. Human Rights Watch also reported his detention as well as other members of the opposition and the potential for serious abuse during his imprisonment. He is now released from prison after the government pardoned him and other prisoners of conscience.

== Early life ==
=== Childhood, education and career ===
Andualem was born in Fart'a county, Gondor, Ethiopia. He was the first son (second child) of Aragie Wale and Kassanesh Gebeyehu. He attended Meskerem Elementary School, Addis Ababa, while living with his Aunt.

Andualem initially attended Kokebe Tsibah High School in Addis Ababa finishing grades nine and ten, but transferred to Saint Joseph High School in Ethiopia, when he won a competitive scholarship. Upon graduation in 1996, he went on to study history at Addis Ababa University. In 1999, he graduated with a Bachelor of Arts degree in history.

His first job after graduation was at the World Bank where he was a researcher. He later worked for the Ethiopian Economic Association.

== Politics ==
Andualem started his political career in 2000 as a founding member of the Ethiopian Democratic Party (EDP). He was later elected to the position of Deputy General Secretary of EDP. In 2005, he was an officer of a large coalition of opposition parties formally known as the Coalition for Unity and Democracy or informally as Kinijit. The Kinijit was made up of the All-Ethiopian Unity Party, the Ethiopian Democratic Party, the Rainbow Party, and the Ethiopian Democratic League Party.

In 2005, he ran for parliament representing his district in South Gondar Zone and the Coalition for Unity and Democracy. He also participated in some of the election debates representing the CUD, as reported at the time by Addis Fortune. In the election disputes that followed shortly after the Ethiopian government announced that it had won the election and banned demonstrations, Andualem was imprisoned for more than two years at Kaliti Prison along with journalists, more than 200 opposition party leaders, independent election observers, and civil society activists. International election observers, while praising the lead up to the elections, mostly condemned the election results which the opposition claimed to have won both at the national, local, and parliamentary level. The Carter Center declared that "there were a considerable number of the constituency results that had significant problems and whose credibility was in question." The European Union Election Observation Mission started its final report by stating that "EU observers witnessed cases that suggested serious irregularities with election results, including figures that were implausible.

After his negotiated release from prison in 2007, along with the rest of opposition members, he continued his political career by co-founding, on June 20, 2008, the Unity for Democracy and Justice party. In 2009, he was elected Vice President and Press Secretary of the new party. Andualem ran for parliament representing UDJ.

Andualem remained the Vice Chair and the Head of Public Relations of his party until his re-arrest and imprisonment by the Ethiopian government on September 14, 2011 on terrorism charges. Despite international pressure for his release from the European Union and the United States of America, he was sentenced to life in prison on June 27, 2012. The official government news agency also announced the guilty verdict stating that the defendants "were attempting to dismantle the constitution."

In May 2019, he was elected the Deputy Leader of Ethiopia Citizens for Social Justice (ECSJ).

== World reaction to imprisonment ==
- Human Rights Watch, September 16, 2011, called for his release.
- Amnesty International, September 16, 2011, called on the Ethiopian government to end crackdown on government critics, listed Andualem as one of the victims of the government crackdown

== Current status ==
- Andualem was freed along other journalists on April 5, 2018.

== See also ==
- Reeyot Alemu
- Eskinder Nega
- Daniel Bekele
- Arena Tigray
- Bekele Gerba
- Habtamu Ayalew
- List of detained journalists and activists in Ethiopia (2023)
