= Feteh =

Ethiopian weekly newspaper

- Type: Weekly
- Founder: Temesgen Desalegn
- Founded: 2008; 17 years ago
- Political alignment: Independent
- Headquarters: Ethiopia

Feteh (Amharic: ፍትሕ) is an Ethiopian independent weekly newspaper founded in 2008 by Temesgen Desalegn. The paper is known for its critical coverage of Dr. Abiy's government. Its name translates into English as "Justice".

According to the US-based Committee to Protect Journalists (CPJ), between 2008 and July 2011, the Ethiopian government filed 41 lawsuits against Desalegn for his work with the paper. In 2011, one of its columnists, 28-year-old Reeyot Alemu, was arrested on terrorism charges.

On 4 May 2012, Desalegn was found guilty of contempt of court after Feteh published the full text of a courtroom statement by independent journalist Eskinder Nega, who was on trial for terrorism charges. In the statement, Nega asserted his innocence and criticized the charges against him. Desalegn was given a suspended four-month prison term and a 2,000 birr (US$113) fine. CPJ protested the sentence, calling it an example of "growing severity of censorship in Ethiopia".

In July 2012, Feteh was closed by government order, and 30,000 copies of the paper were seized. A prosecutor stated that the paper's coverage had been found to be "detrimental to the country’s national security".

On 10 August, Desalegn learned through a radio broadcast that he was being charged under three articles of Ethiopia's Criminal Code: Article 613, "defamation and calumny"; Article 486, "inciting the public through false rumours"; and Article 238, "outrages against the Constitution or the Constitutional Order", a capital offense. The charges were in response to articles published in August 2011, February 2012, and March 2012, in which Feteh had reported on youth protests against the government. The UK-based anti-censorship organization Article 19 issued a statement in support of Desalegn and called for the charges to be dropped.

On 23 August, three days after the death of long-time prime minister Meles Zenawi, Desalegn was arrested on defamation charges as part of a general crackdown on government critics. After a court denied him bail, he was taken to Kaliti prison.

== See also ==
- List of newspapers in Ethiopia
