= Fundamental rights in Ethiopia =

Fundamental rights in Ethiopia include the constitutional rights of assembly, expression and press, right to life and liberty, religion and among others. The current constitution granted all rights to citizens but the government implementation on these issues has been great concern, regarding human rights violations.

As of 2023, the Freedom House labeled Ethiopia "Not Free" state, scoring 21 out of 100. This indicates that Ethiopia is far from protection of fundamental rights.

== Freedom of expression and press ==
Under Article 29 of the 1995 FDRE Constitution, Ethiopia granted freedom of expression, press and prohibit censorship by allowing information exchange. The article stipulates "people have the right to seek, share and hold information without any interference. Everyone has the right to freedom of expression without any interference." This includes the right to "seek, receive and impart information and ideas of all kinds without limitation" using written, oral and visual medium.

In July 2009, the Ethiopian government enacted Anti-terrorism Law and the Mass Media and Access to Information Proclamation in 2008. Critics argued these laws are systematic tool for government to initiate crackdowns, restricting political freedoms as well as detaining journalists.

Journalists have been arrested since Meles Zenawi's premiership that includes hundreds media personnel without trial. Since 2019, Ethiopia, along with Cameroon, Rwanda and Tunisia, is considered the "worst jailer in Africa" classified by the Committee to Protect Journalists (CPJ). During Abiy Ahmed premiership, political repression further intensified by restricting certain media outlets in YouTube, arresting their founders and charging with "terrorism". According to CPJ annual prison census report on 1 December 2023, Ethiopia is the second country to imprison journalists, with eight journalists are in serious condition and four of these were without charge or trial. This was during the 2023 state of emergency following a clash between Fano militia and ENDF force.

Among detained journalists, Belay Manaye, co-founder of the YouTube channel Ethio News, Bekalu Alamirew, founder and editor-in-chief of the online media Alpha TV, confined seven to ten months mostly held in Awash Arba military camp; Tewodros Zerfu, host of YouTube channel Yegna TV held for ten months and released two days earlier. In February 2024, French journalist Antoine Galindo detained in Skylight Hotel in Addis Ababa by security forces in civilian plainclothes. He was a reporter of Paris-based private news agency, the Africa Intelligence.

Amidst in Tigray War, Ethiopia was 130 out of 180 countries of World Press Freedom Index in November 2022. In 2021, a media law was enacted by the Council of Ministers under Proclamation No. 1238/2021 that established the Ethiopian Media Authority as regulatory and licensing agency. The law repealed the 2007 broadcasting service Proclamation No. 533/2007. This enables political freedom and media autonomy in contrast to the previous promulgation. Nevertheless, credible independent journalist association like the Ethiopian Media Council allowed authority to dismantle ethnic journalism.

== Freedom of religion ==
Since the establishment of the Derg regime in 1974, Ethiopia has been a secular state. During this period, state atheism was widely declared as state religion when the Marxist-Leninist government consolidate its power. Nevertheless, the Derg maintained all religion should be equal as socialist policy, even though religious persecution was strongly promoted. As the growth of nationalization occurred nationwide, the Derg regime prohibited privileges to the church such as the right to tax the land and seizure the church land by the government, fearing religious emancipation could strength ethnic difference and endangered the government power.

The 1995 Constitution guarantees freedom of religion, belief, opinion, either by choice or by worship and observance under Article 27. However, as much as exercising freedom of religion, there is also concerns in pragmatic implementation with many human rights groups indicate serious violation and limitation. Ethiopia has religious diversity with high population of Christian and Muslim community. Ethiopian Orthodoxy is the largest with 43.8%, followed by Islam (31.3%) and Protestant (22.8%). To address religious harmony, tolerance, peace and security, the Inter-Religious Council of Ethiopia was founded in 2010.

In 2012, Ethiopian Muslim civil rights movement accused the government of meddling with their religion, alleging that the EPRDF government backed a foreign Islamic entity called Al-Ahbash. In the Ethiopian Orthodox, an illegal appointment of bishops supposedly by the government caused great concern. For instance, the appointment of Bishops in the Southwest Shewa zone of the Oromia region was condemned by the Holy Synod, who state the government used to illegal appointment to divide the church in favor of supporting certain faction groups. Most importantly, the 25-episcopate group of bishop in Oromia and Southern Nations, Nationalities, and Peoples' Region, led by Abune Sawiros, was condemned by the Holy Synod, who excommunicate from attending the church service. The event ensued crisis between the Ethiopian Orthodox Church and newly formed convocation. On 4 February, clashes occurred in Shahemane between the followers and security officials that led the death of three Orthodox youths.

== Freedom of assembly ==
The Constitution Article 30 enshrined the right of peaceful assembly, organize, whether in demonstration, protest or petition. The Article 31 states the Freedom of Association of any institutions and organizations legally. However, exercising the freedom faces restrictions due to ineffectiveness from the government policy.

== See also ==
- Human rights in Ethiopia
