= Yasaffiw hezb dems =

Newspaper of the All-Ethiopian Socialist Movement

Yasaffiw hezb dems (Amharic: የሰፊው ሕዝብ ድምጽ, 'Voice of the Masses') was a newspaper in Ethiopia. It was the central organ of the All-Ethiopian Socialist Movement (Meison).

Yasaffiw hezb dems was launched as an underground weekly newspaper in August 1974, as the organ of the group that later became known as Meison. It was published in the capital despite the military regime's censorship of the press. Together with the rival Democracia, Yasaffiw hezb dems was the most frequently distributed radical tract in Addis Ababa in the early phase of the Ethiopian revolution.

Yasaffiw hezb dems pressured the Derg military junta to suspend the imperial constitution, depose the Emperor, nationalize industries and banks, disband the old spying networks and imprison aristocrats of the old imperial regime. In a series of articles, in particular in its October 22, 1974 and January 27, 1975, editions, Yasaffiw hezb dems presented an elaborate criticism of the "Ethiopian Socialism" doctrine (hibrtesebawenet) of the Derg junta. The newspaper argued that there could not be "Ethiopian electricity" or "Somali electricity". Rather Yasaffiw hezb dems argued in favour of scientific socialism.

By late 1975, the feud between Meison and its main adversary on the left, the Ethiopian People's Revolutionary Party (EPRP), became public and attacks on EPRP frequently appeared in Yasaffiw hezb dems.

MEISON published its withdrawal of "critical support" to the Derg in its August 19, 1977 edition of Yasaffiw hezb dems.
