= Consortium of Ethiopian Human Rights Organizations =

Ethiopian government agency

The Consortium of Ethiopian Human Rights Organizations (CEHRO)
- የኢትዮጵያ የሰብዓዊ መብቶች ድርጅቶች ህበረት (ኢሰመድህ)

Agency overview
- Formed: 2018; 8 years ago
- Type: Non-governmental organization
- Headquarters: Addis Ababa, Ethiopia
- Website: cehro.org

Consortium of Ethiopian Human Rights Organizations founded in 2018 is an organization of 18 civil society organizations (CSO), working on the human rights, peace building and democracy. It's a body that is aim at bringing CSOs together to have one voice. It is made up of over 1500 members and 5 founding associations. The headquarters is located at Addis Ababa, Ethiopia.

== Funding and partnerships ==
CEHRO receives funding from international donors, development partners, and member contributions to support its programs and secretariat. The consortium has partnered with UN agencies, diplomatic missions, and international NGOs on human rights and civil society strengthening projects. Financial and narrative reports are submitted to the Authority for Civil Society Organizations in accordance with Ethiopian law.

== Thematic areas of work ==
Beyond general human rights advocacy, CEHRO and its members work on several thematic areas:

- Business and human rights: Monitoring the human rights impacts of investment and development projects.

== Founding groups ==
The founding associations include:

- Ethiopian Human Rights Council (EHRCO),
- Vision Ethiopian Congress for democracy (VECOD)
- Advocates Ethiopia (AE),
- Developmental Justice National Association (DJNA) and
- Sara-Justice from All Women Association.
