= 2009 Ethiopian Anti-Terrorism Act =

Anti-Terrorism Proclamation No. 1176/2020

Ethiopian government
- Territorial extent: Ethiopia
- Enacted by: Ethiopian government
- Enacted: 7 July 2009
- Status: In force

On 7 July 2009, Ethiopia passed Anti-Terrorism Legislation Proclamation 652/2009. The law has been controversial due to its promulgation. Proponent argued that the law is necessary to combat terrorism as ordinary laws inadequately enforced in accordance with United Nations Security Council resolution 1373 in 2001. Opponent argued the law dismissed fundamental rights, and used to justification of crackdowns against dissents and oppositions by the government.

== 2013 debate ==
In August 2013, a debate panel was held regarding the law application whether it needed or contentious issue. One of the issues that was raised in the debate was the rationale to pass the law. The ruling party Ethiopian People's Revolutionary Democratic Front (EPRDF) representatives defended the law, citing real danger of terrorism in Ethiopia and the ordinary laws ineffectiveness to combat terrorism. The major opposition party, the Ethiopian Democratic Party also concurred the rationale of the law, adding the UN Security Council resolution 1373 is mandatory for enactment, while UN Security Council also instruct every states including Ethiopia to pass anti-terror laws.

Representatives from other oppositions party stated that although terrorist threats would occur in Ethiopia, it is not much extent that lead to justify the law. They claimed that the law used as a tool for government crackdown and imprisonment.
