= Woineshet Zebene =

First Ethiopian woman to legally challenge a bridal abduction

Woineshet Zebene Negash, also known as Woineshet Zebene, is a rape victim whose case was responsible for a change in Ethiopian law. She was the first Ethiopian ever legally to challenge a bridal abduction.

Traditionally in rural Ethiopia, if a man wants to marry a woman but does not have the money to pay a bride price for her, he kidnaps and rapes her, after which she is expected to marry him because she is considered "ruined" and will probably be unable to find anyone else willing to marry her.

When Woineshet was 13 she was kidnapped and raped. The leader of the men who participated in this (Aberew Jemma Negussi) was briefly arrested, but then released on bail, at which point he kidnapped Woineshet again and held her for over a month until she managed to escape, but only after he had forced her to sign a marriage certificate. At this time, Ethiopian law stated that a man could not be charged with rape if he married the victim.

On July 22, 2003, Aberew Jemma Negussie was sentenced to 10 years’ imprisonment without parole for kidnapping and rape, and his four accomplices were each sentenced to 8 years’ imprisonment without parole, making Woineshet's case the first case in which accomplices were also charged and convicted for kidnapping. However, just four months later, on December 4, 2003, the High Court of the Arsi Zone sitting on appeal overturned the decision of the lower court and released the five men from prison.

On May 9, 2005, the new Ethiopian Penal Code came into effect, which removed the marital exemption for kidnapping and rape, largely due to a campaign by Equality Now inspired by Woineshet's case.

On March 10, 2016, Africa's human rights-focused Union court based in The Gambia ruled that "Ethiopia had violated the girl's rights to equality, dignity and a fair trial, among others," ordering the state to pay Woineshet $150,000 as compensation.
