= Befeqadu Hailu =

Ethiopian writer and activist (born 1980)

Befeqadu Hailu Techanie also written as Befekadu Hailu Techane (Amharic: በፍቃዱ ኃይሉ; born 19 February 1980) is an Ethiopian writer, activist, and blogger. He is a member of the Zone 9 bloggers group that were arrested in April 2014 due to their blogging activities. Befekadu is now released on bail and is defending himself before court on a downgraded charge of 'inciting violence through writing'.

His novel, Children of their Parents (2013), won third place in the 2012 Burt Award for African Literature. In 2015, along with the other Zone 9 bloggers, he was awarded the International Press Freedom Award from the Committee to Protect Journalists.

== Biography ==
Befekadu was born on February 19, 1980, in Addis Ababa, Ethiopia. He earned a Bachelor of Science degree in Management and Information Systems from Zegha Business College in 2006 and worked as an MIS Expert at St. Mary's University College. Since 2009, he has worked as a journalist for various publications and at one point served as Managing Editor for Enqu, a prominent Ethiopian magazine.

Befekadu also writes poetry and has published poetry compilations online.

Befekadu first began blogging on his personal blog, The Q Perspective, where he wrote about socio-political issues in Ethiopia. He later became one of the founding members of Zone 9, a collective of bloggers sharing commentary about political repression and social injustice in Ethiopia. Befekadu is also a member of Global Voices Online, an international network of bloggers and translators.

In 2019, Befekadu and his fellows founded the Center for Advancement of Rights and Democracy, a non-governmental, non-profit civil society organization following the legal reform for civil society organizations in Ethiopia.

=== Arrest ===
Due to his activities as part of the Zone 9 group, Befekadu was arrested on April 25, 2014, and charged with terrorism. Specifically, he was charged with violating Article 4 of the 2009 Anti-Terrorism Proclamation as well as various other laws. The government accused Befekadu of being a leader of a terrorist enterprise and inciting violence. They also accused him of collaborating with Ginbot 7, a banned political party that the government has labelled a terrorist organization. At his hearing, Befekadu stated that he was forced to make false confessions. On 21 October 2015, Befekadu was acquitted of terrorism charges and released on bail of 20,000 ETB (est. equivalent of US$1,000) to defend himself before court, to be cleared of downgraded charges of 'inciting violence through writing'.

Befekadu was re-arrested on November 10, 2016, after giving an interview for Voice of America's Amharic Service about Ethiopia's state of emergency. He was subsequently released in December, along with thousands of other political prisoners detained during the state of emergency.

== Publications ==
- Children of their Parents. Addis Ababa: CODE-Ethiopia, 2013. ISBN 9789994487608. OCLC 890808411. 228 pages.

== Awards ==
- 2012: Burt Award for African Literature, third place, from the Canadian Organization for Development through Education (CODE), administered by Canada Council for the Arts, for Children of their Parents.
- 2015: International Press Freedom Award, from the Committee to Protect Journalists, New York City, awarded to the group of Zone 9 bloggers.
- 2019: PEN Pinter Prize, International Writer of Courage Award
