= Democracia =

Organ of the Ethiopian People's Revolutionary Party

Demos
- Type: Weekly (at time of foundation)
- Publisher: Ethiopian People's Revolutionary Party
- Founded: July 1974
- Language: Amharic

Democracia (Amharic: ዴሞክራሲያ, 'Democracy') is the organ of the Ethiopian People's Revolutionary Party. It was launched as a clandestine weekly newspaper in July 1974, as the Central Committee of the Ethiopian People's Liberation Organization (as the EPRP was known at the time) returned to Ethiopia from exile. At the time the EPRP was often known simply as the Democracia group, as the existence of the party was not publicly known.

== Overview ==
Democracia quickly acquired a significant readership in the student and trade union movements. Along with its sister publication Abyot (which had become associated with EPRP), Democracia played an important role in defining the Ethiopian revolution; at one point Democracia had a larger readership than the government publications. According to Markakis and Waller, Democracia "became the most avidly read publication in Ethiopia's history". But the publication was also subjected to repression. During the early phase of the revolution, possession of a copy of Democracia could lead to imprisonment, torture or execution. On the other hand, the fact that EPRP was able to print Democracia in the capital Addis Ababa in spite of tight control by the security forces has led to speculations that the party might have had sympathizers within the police ranks.

Democracia labelled the political rhetoric of the Derg military junta as vague, in reference to its discourses of hibretesebawenet (egalitarian socialism) and itiyopia tikdem ("Ethiopia First"). Key demands raised in Democracia included democratic rights for the masses, freedom to organize associations, and the transfer of power from the Derg to a provisional popular government. Democracia pressured the Derg to suspend the imperial constitution, depose the Emperor, nationalize industries and banks, disband the old spying networks and imprison aristocrats of the old imperial regime. Democracia labelled the moves taken by the Derg in this direction to be insufficient and superficial. The only positive commentaries raised by Democracia towards the Derg junta concerned its land reform programme. However, Democracia considered that the Derg reform did not enable people to take direct control under a worker's government, but allowed the transfer of lands to bureaucratic capitalists.

By late 1975, the feud between the EPRP and its main adversary on the left (the All-Ethiopian Socialist Movement or Meison) became public, and attacks on Meison frequently appeared in Democracia. In the beginning of 1976, Democracia began to express concern regarding the plans of the Derg to build a one-party state in Ethiopia.
