= Ambo University =

National university in Oromia Region, Ethiopia

- Yuunivarsiitii Amboo
- Motto: Better Future Through Knowledge and Wisdom
- Type: National university
- Established: 11 May 2011
- Accreditation: Ministry of Education
- President: Dr. Bayissa Leta Danno
- Academic staff: 1,800
- Total staff: 6,500
- Students: 25,150
- Undergraduates: 19,000
- Postgraduates: 6,000
- Doctoral students: 150
- Location: Ambo, Oromia Region, Ethiopia; 8.982235°N 37.844778°E
- Website: www.ambou.edu.et
- Location within Ethiopia

Ambo University (Amharic: አምቦ ዩኒቨርሲቲ; Oromo: Yunivarsiitii Amboo) is a national university in Ambo, Oromia Region, Ethiopia. It is approximately 114 kilometres (71 mi) west of Addis Ababa, Ethiopia. The Ministry of Education admits qualified students to Ambo University based on their score on the Ethiopian Higher Education Entrance Examination (EHEEE). Ambo University was established on 11 May 2011, by government proclamation (Council of Ministers 212/2011).

== History ==
Ambo University was founded on May 11, 2011, by government proclamation (Council of Ministers 212/2011). It is non-profit public higher education institution. The university is recognized by the Ministry of Education as coeducational Ethiopian higher education institution. Originally, the university's foundation traced back to 1947, becoming one of the oldest higher educational institutions where basic education began in a building constructed by a few French engineers. Languages taught at that period limited to Amharic, Mathematics, French, etc., and there were four Ethiopian and four French teachers.

Ambo envisages surpassing academic, research, and community service qualifications to attain a higher education standard. Ambo currently has 75 graduate programs, 71 undergraduate programs, 10 PhD programs, and 4 specialty programs with nine colleges/institutes/schools, and academic departments. In addition, Ambo expanded its branch to four campuses, such as Main Campus, Hacalu Hundessa, Mamo Mezemer, and Waliso.

== See also ==
- List of universities and colleges in Ethiopia
- Education in Ethiopia
