= Unity for Democracy and Justice =

Former political party in Ethiopia (2008–2019)

- Chairperson: Birtukan Midekssa; Yacob Haile-Mariam
- General Secretary: Andualem Aragie
- Standing Committee: National Executive Committee
- Deputy Chairpersons: Gizachew Shiferaw; Hailu Araaya; Negaso Gidada; Siye Abraha; Asrat Tasie
- Founder: Birtukan Midekssa
- Founded: 20 June 2008
- Dissolved: May 2019
- Merger of: Ethiopian Citizens for Social Justice
- Headquarters: Addis Ababa
- Ideology: Liberalism

The Unity for Democracy and Justice was an Ethiopian political party. It was founded by Birtukan Midekssa on 20 June 2008, based on the parties that constituted the Coalition for Unity and Democracy. It was a major component in the eight-party Medrek coalition, the largest opposition coalition in the 2010 election. In May 2019, the party merged with the Ethiopian Citizens for Social Justice, bringing an end to the party.

== Overview ==
The Unity for Democracy and Justice Party (UDJP), commonly known as Andenet (Amharic for Unity), is an Ethiopian national opposition political party established by former leaders and members of Coalition for Unity and Democracy Party (CUD). Andenet is a short form of UDJP's Amharic name, Andenet ledemocracy ena lefitih. It was formed by former CUD leaders and members advocating for free and fair Ethiopian elections in the then-upcoming 2010 elections. The UDJP was chaired and vice-chaired by Birtukan Midekssa and Yakob Haile-Mariam, respectively. Both were detained and sentenced to life in prison before they were controversially pardoned on 6 October 2008 and September 2007, respectively. Their arrests were considered by Ethiopian political opposition parties as a Majority Government attempt to block fair and free election and democratic process.

== Current performances ==
UDJP was formed with 42 parliament members and the representatives of former CUD leaders and members on 17 June 2008. Support organizations abroad. Members representing woredas in Ethiopia were also in attendance. This meeting was supposed to be held at Imperial Hotel on 13 June 2008, but due to government problems, it was postponed. The meeting was later held in a tent in the compound of the party. After 6 hours of discussion, 60 permanent and 15 temporary central committee members were elected out of 105 nominated representatives. The same meeting elected the party's 18 executives (of which 6 are top executives): The chair was Midekssa.

UDJP was formed on 17 June 2008. On 15 December 2009, the National Executive Committee of UDJ made the following assignments and reassignments of duties:

- Wzt. Birtukan Mideksa – Chairperson
- Engineer Gizachew Shiferaw – Deputy Chairperson (formerly Deputy Chairperson and Head of Organizational Affairs)
- Hailu Araaya – Deputy Chairperson and Head of Study and Research
- Negaso Gidada – Deputy Chairperson and Head of Foreign Affairs
- Ato Siyye Abraha – Deputy Chairperson and Head of Public Relations
- Ato Asrat Tasie – Head of Organizational Affairs
- Ato Andualem Aragie – General Secretary
- Ato Haileyesus Mekonnen – Deputy Head of Organizational Affairs
- Ato Shimelis Habte – Deputy Head of Public Relations

On the same day, the bylaws and manifesto that the party adopted from its predecessor, CUD, was reviewed and adopted. After three reviews by NEBE and the corresponding amendments and explanation by UDJP, the chairwoman obtained the registration certificate of the party.

UDJP has support organizations on all continents. It has 34 offices in Ethiopian regions of Amhara, Oromia, Southern state, Afar, Harari and Addis Ababa.

== Ideology ==
=== Constitutional reform ===
- Stable Constitution
- The right for self
- Determination up to secession is in the interest of Revolutionary Democracy
- Respect for citizens rights as individuals or groups
- Private, public and communal ownership and for the sale and purchase of land.
- Federal regions set up on criteria accommodating the various interests, wishes attitudes of the people. Federal regions shall take into account the people's will historical and cultural links, language, settlement pattern, geographical location, developmental viability and administrative efficiency.
- The city council of Addis Ababa shall be clearly accountable to the House of the Federation.
- Legislative power shall be applied to help accommodate the interests, heeds, and attitudes of the people and shall be effective enough to ensure non-incursion by the executive power as well as ensure that the media, Electoral Board and the Civil Service Commission are accountable to Parliament.
- The principle of the vote of confidence to guard against executive abuse of power.
- The House of Federation has the same legislative powers as does the House of Peoples' Representatives. If the House of the Federation has legislative power, it cannot have the power to interpret the Constitution because, to prevent legislating from violating the Constitution.
- The President to have the power to serve as the symbol of the unity of the people, to resolve conflicts and coordinate humanitarian activities with neutrality.
- Term of office of the Prime Minister limited to two terms.
- The duties and responsibilities of the Council of Ministers will not infringe upon the legislative and judiciary bodies. The Council of Ministers will be improved to enable it to have the power to call a vote of confidence on the Prime Minister.
- Defense forces and police will be improved to protect human and democratic rights.
- The provisions on the establishment National Electoral Board and the appointment of its members will be improved to guarantee the neutrality and independence of The Board.

=== Economic rehabilitation ===
- Private, community, and government land ownership
- Interrelated agricultural and industrial developments
- 12 years of elementary and high school education
- Infrastructural development
- Preventive healthcare with focus on HIV/AIDS

=== Foreign relations ===
- Reinstating Ethiopia's right to port
- Building a mutually beneficial use of international rivers and boundary demarcation.

=== Governance ===
- Bicameral parliament with a directly elected president
- Federal government comprising regional states formed on geography, culture, and identity
- Freedom of religion, speech, and respect for human rights
- Free media, election board and public service

== Arrest and torture of its leaders ==
Ahead of the 2015 election, Habtamu Ayalew, who served on the leadership team was detained and tortured from July 2014 to December 2015.
