= Ethiopian Human Rights Council =

Non-governmental organisation created in 1991

- Established: 10 October 1991 (35 years ago)
- Types: non-governmental organization
- Aim: human rights
- Country: Ethiopia
- Website: ehrco.org

The Ethiopian Human Rights Council or EHRCO is an Ethiopian human rights non-governmental organisation created in 1991 by Mesfin Woldemariam and 31 colleagues shortly after the dictator Mengistu Haile Mariam was overthrown. EHRCO's funds and staff were greatly reduced in 2009 as a result of a law limiting the role of foreign funds in citizens' associations, and restored by 2020, after Abiy Ahmed became the new prime minister, allowing EHRCO to expand its operations. EHRCO published its preliminary report on the Mai Kadra massacre of the Tigray War on 25 December 2020. It is part of the Consortium of Ethiopian Human Rights Organisations.

== Creation ==
The Ethiopian Human Rights Council was created on 10 October 1991 by Mesfin Woldemariam and 31 colleagues in 1991 shortly after Mengistu Hailemariam was replaced by the Transitional Government of Ethiopia, dominated by the Ethiopian People's Revolutionary Democratic Front (EPRDF). In 1993, EHRCO filed a lawsuit against the Ethiopian government for refusing its registration as a citizens' association. The government claimed that EHRCO was "a political organisation", "side[d] with the opposition" was "ethnically oriented" and made inaccurate reports, EHRCO disagreed. Mesfin was detained by the authorities in 1993 and later released on bail, without charges nor trial.

== Leadership ==
EHRCO was headed by Mesfin Woldemariam from its creation in 1991 through to 2005. Yoseph Badwaza led EHRCO from 2007 to 2009. In 2018, Ameha Mekonnen headed EHRCO. Dan Yirga was acting executive director in October 2020.

== Aims ==
The initial aims of EHRCO were described as helping the 1991 Transitional Government of Ethiopia in "respecting, protecting and fulfilling human rights."

== Actions ==
Dan Yirga, executive director of EHRCO in 2020, summarised EHRCO's main actions as having consisted of investigating human rights violations; providing human rights awareness training to police, judges, lawyers and community representatives, carrying out human rights advocacy and providing free legal aid. EHRCO planned a one-day human rights workshop for media organisations and political parties for 20 October 2020.

EHRCO protested against the forcible 1998–1998 deportation of 52,000 "Eritrean" Ethiopians to Eritrea. Mesfin Woldemariam stated the deportations were "causing a build up of hatred" that if continued, would "lead to indiscriminate violence that [would] go on for generations".

In 2020, EHRCO planned to provide voters' education and election monitoring, claiming extensive experience from the 2005 Ethiopian general election.

On 25 December 2020, EHRCO published its preliminary report on the Mai Kadra massacre of the Tigray War, finding that 1100 civilians had been killed, attributing the killings to youth from the Samri and other kebeles, supported by Tigray Special Forces and militia. Survivors stated to EHRCO that ethnic Tigrayans had protected and aided potential victims in escaping; these Tigrayans had left due to fear and weren't contactable by EHRCO.

== Repression ==
Repression of EHRCO members included arrests, beatings and killing by security forces. Executive Committee member Assefa Maru was killed.

In 2009, Ethiopian authorities froze Br 8,797,184.28 in EHRCO's bank accounts following the Charities and Societies Proclamation No. 621/2009 (law) that required at least 90 per cent of associations' incomes to come from local instead of international sources. The freeze forced EHRCO to close ten out of thirteen (or eight out of eleven) of its offices and to sack 80 (or 52) staff members. EHRCO was also forced by the 621/2009 law to drop "Ethiopian" from its name, since it had representation in less than five regions. The European Union created a fund considered to be locally Ethiopian, the Civil Society Fund, which in 2015, provided EHRCO and other Ethiopian non-governmental organisations with legally permitted financial support.

In 2018, EHRCO wrote to the new Ethiopian prime minister Abiy Ahmed asking for the freeze to be lifted. Following the Civil Societies Proclamation 1113/2019, EHRCO legally restored its original name. EHRCO's frozen funds were restored by 2020.
