= Daniel Bekele =

Ethiopian lawyer and human rights activist (born 1967)

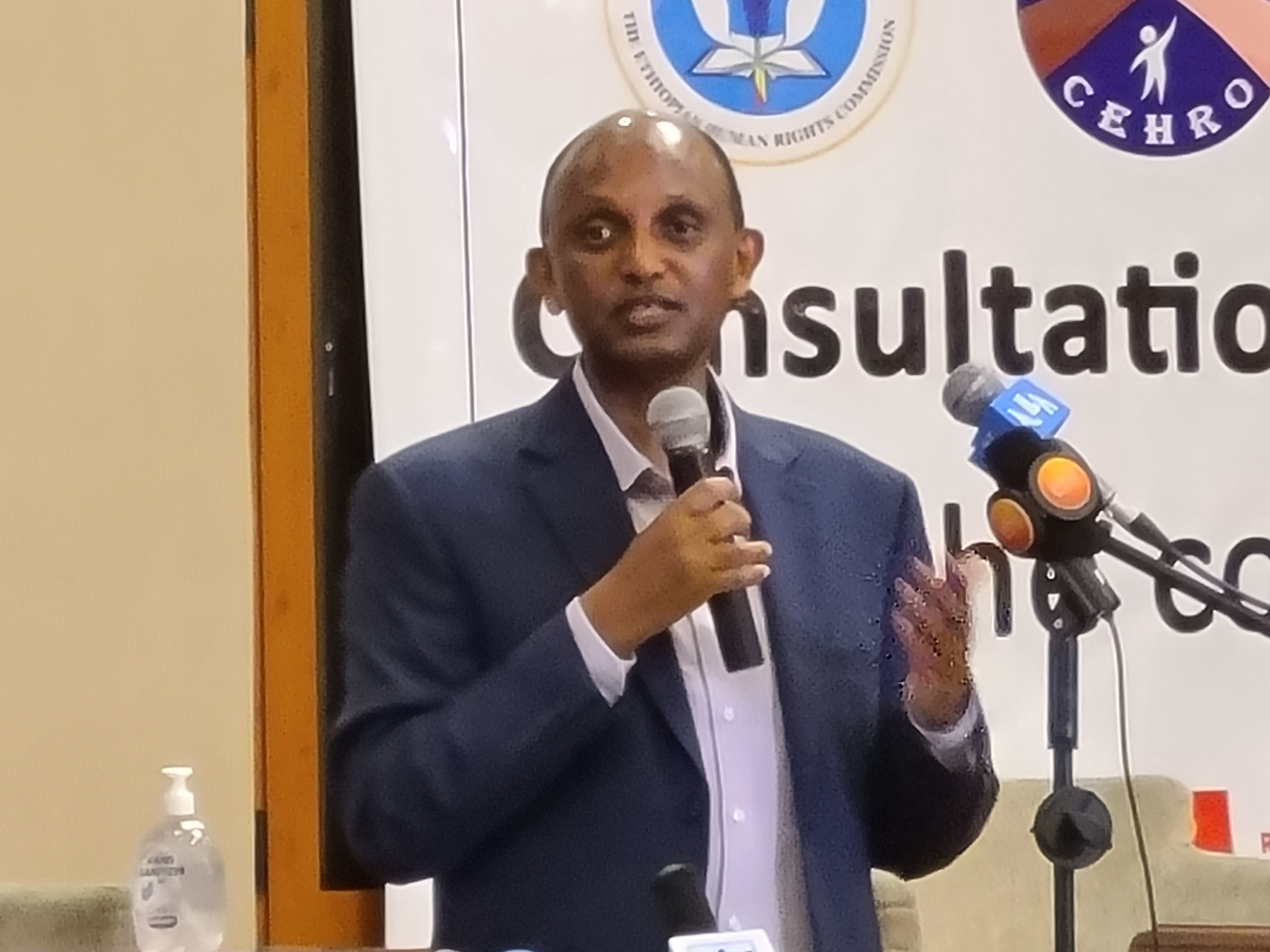
- Born: 17 February 1967 (age 59); Addis Ababa, Ethiopian Empire
- Education: Addis Ababa University (LLB, MA); Oxford University (MA, PhD)
- Occupations: Lawyer, Human Right Expert and Advocate
- Title: Chief Commissioner of the Ethiopian Human Rights Commission
- Term: 2019–2024
- Awards: German Africa Prize (2021); EU Schuman Award (2024); Alison Des Forges Award for Extraordinary Activism (HRW 2009)

Daniel Bekele (Amharic: ዳንኤል በቀለ; 17 February 1967) is an Ethiopian lawyer, human rights expert and activist. He was detained from 2005 to 2008 for his election monitoring report and complaints about irregularities of the 2005 Ethiopian general election. He was executive director of the Africa division at Human Rights Watch from 2011 to 2016. He also served as Senior Advisor at Amnesty International (2018 - 2019); as Policy Research and Advocacy Director at ActionAid Ethiopia. In 2019, Daniel was appointed Chief Commissioner of the Ethiopian Human Rights Commission. After the end of his 5 years term, he announced in July 2024 that he is not seeking re-election for a second term. In 2025, Berhanu Adelo was appointed Chief Commissioner replacing Daniel Bekele.

== Youth and education ==
Daniel Bekele was born in the city of Addis Ababa on 17 February 1967. He graduated in 1989 with a bachelor's degree in law (LL.B) and in 2001 with a master's degree (MA) in Development Studies from Addis Ababa University. He further obtained a second master's degree in Legal Studies in 2003 and a PhD in International Law/Human Rights Law in 2019 from Oxford University

== Early career ==
Daniel was a legal advisor to Ethiopian Sugar Corporation during 1989–1990, and then became an independent Attorney & Legal Consultant. He specialized in supporting civil society, human rights education, and promoted legal and policy reform for improving human rights including protections for women's rights. Daniel became Head of Policy Research and Advocacy at ActionAid in 2004, as he continued to support civil society including voter education and election monitoring initiative by CSOs. He also served in the private sector where he held a senior position as Director of Legal Services and Secretary of the Board in United Insurance Company. Daniel was one of the leaders of the Ethiopian component of the Global Call to Action Against Poverty campaign.

== 2005–2008 detention ==
Daniel was one of the key civil society Leaders coordinating voter education, monitoring of the 2005 Ethiopian general election. He criticized the procedures of how the election was held and involved in peace initiative to resolve the electoral dispute and impasse. On 16 October 2005, he was "badly beaten by unidentified armed men", which Amnesty International interpreted to be a result of his human rights work and criticisms of the electoral procedures. Daniel was detained on 1 November 2005. In December 2007, he and Netsanet Demissie were convicted in trumped up charges at the Ethiopian Federal High Court for "provoking and preparing 'outrages against the Constitution'" by a majority of two judges out of three, after a two-year flawed trial. Daniel and Netsanet were released on 28 March 2008. Amnesty International considered Daniel's and Netsanet's detention and conviction to have been only based on their human rights activities, and defined both as having been prisoners of conscience. Amnesty director for Africa, Erwin van der Borght, stated, "It is deplorable that civil society activists who are prisoners of conscience like Daniel Bekele and Netsanet Demissie can be arrested and unfairly convicted simply for peacefully conducting human rights work."

== Human rights bodies ==
Daniel was executive director of the Africa division of Human Rights Watch (HRW) from 2011 to 2016, and later became its senior director for Africa advocacy. He also served as Senior Advisor for Amnesty International and European Center for Electoral Support (2018 - 2019) In July 2019, Daniel was appointed as Chief Commissioner of the Ethiopian Human Rights Commission (EHRC), selected from among 88 candidates by the House of Peoples' Representatives (HoPR, the lower house of Ethiopian parliament) replacing Addisu Gebreegziabhier. He was replaced by Berhanu Adelo in 2025 following appointment by the parliament of Ethiopia.

Daniel received several awards including the EU Schuman Human Rights Award in 2024, The German Africa Award in 2021 2021 German Africa Prize for his commitment to defending human rights and democracy., Ethiopia Annual Bego Sew Award in 2022 for Public Service Leadership, Alison Des Forges Award for Extraordinary Activism in 2009 from Human Rights Watch, and The Prisoners of Conscience Post-Graduate Study Award in 2009 from Prisoners of Conscience Appeal Fund

== Points of view ==
In addition to his advocacy for human rights, peace, justice and development, Daniel has written on a wide range of topics including "Getting Natural Resources Governance Right"; How the Truth Commission in The Gambia should complement Justice; How Africa's leaders should address the problems that hinder the development of the continent's natural resources; Urging Nigeria's former President Buhari to apologize for his sexist remarks; Urging the AU to put human rights first; as well as urging the United States and the European Union to put human rights first and instead of "pay[ing] lip service" to human rights violations in

== See also ==
- Andualem Aragie
