= List of detained journalists and activists in Ethiopia (2023) =

This is a list of journalists and activists detained in Ethiopia in 2023. CPJ reported that in April 2023 alone, 47 human rights organizations made calls on the government of Ethiopia (Abiy Ahmed) to end internet shut downs and digital communications access.

The current Oromo-led Prosperity Party continued its crackdown against ethnic Amhara and related public defenders in 2023. Various arrests of oppositions and media have already been reported since the government came to power in 2018, and condemned by various international groups. Most of these detentions and arbitrary arrests are reported as part of government crackdowns. Those still imprisoned prior to 2023 and still detained are also listed in a separately table.

Previous arbitrary arrests by the TPLF-dominated EPRDF parties were criticized for abusing the Anti-terrorism Proclamation (ATP) law to limit freedom of the press, silence voices, and persecute members of perceived opponents. Similarly, most of the charges imposed against the 2023 detainees by the Prosperity Party regime are also ATP-related.

== Definitions ==
- United Nations: According to Article 9 of the International Covenant on Civil and Political Rights (1966), "No one shall be subjected to arbitrary arrest or detention. No one shall be deprived of his liberty except on such grounds and in accordance with such procedure as are established by law."
- Center for Justice and Accountability: "Arbitrary or unlawful detention occurs when an individual is arrested and detained by a government without due process and without the legal protections of a fair trial, or when an individual is detained without any legal basis for the deprivation of liberty."
- International human rights instruments: "Everyone has the right to liberty and security of person. No one shall be subjected to arbitrary arrest or detention. No one shall be deprived of his liberty except on such grounds and in accordance with such procedure as are established by law."
- Harvard Law: "UN Human Rights Committee's General Comment No. 35 summarizes the treaty body's interpretation of the right to liberty of person, including protection against arbitrary detention, under the International Covenant on Civil and Political Rights is one of the principal human rights treaties at the global level."

== Reactions ==
Amnesty International published a report calling on the government to respect the right to peaceful protest and immediately release detained media staff. The report emphasized that journalists and media workers need to do their work without threat, intimidation and harassment.

Committee to Protect Journalists: Published a series of reports with details of arbitrary arrests of ethnic Amhara journalists and activists, and called for immediate releases.

Ethiopia Human Rights Council: Listed the names of detainees and condemned the mass arrests of media groups and public defenders.

Ethiopian Human Rights Defenders Center (EHRDC): the group called on the Ethiopian government to the immediate release of journalists and to stop the restriction of access to the free flow of information.

== List ==
These lists are not complete. In May 2022 alone, at least 4000 Amhara dissidents were arrested by the Prosperity Party regime, and their status is unknown.

Detained prior to 2023 and still imprisoned
Name	Region	Position	Date arrested	Status	Description & reference
Zemene Kassie (Patriot)	Bahir Dar, Amhara region	Amhara Public Resistance Force (Fano and Militia), leader	September 21, 2022	Released in bail as of June 6, 2023	Part of "major" crackdown by regional and federal security forces.
Tadios Tantu (~80-year-old-man)	Addis Ababa (originally from Wolayta)	Author, historian, and human rights defender	Since May 5, 2021 (disappeared)	Still imprisoned	Part of crackdown and arbitrary arrest of Human rights defenders. Appeared in court to face charges of terrorism and using force to overthrow the government.

Detained in 2023
Name	Region	Position	Date arrested	Status	Description & reference
Ermias Mekuria	Addis Ababa	May 12, 2023	Humanitarian worker for Debre Birhan IDPs	Detained	Part of crackdown and mass arbitrary arrest of Amhara journalists and activists in 2023
Gobeze Sisay	Unclear	May 6, 2023	Amhara Voice internet broadcaster, Founder and journalist	First detention in 2023. Overall, he was arrested at least twice since 2022.	Part of crackdown and mass arbitrary arrest of Amhara journalists and activists in 2023.
Zerihun Gessesse	Amhara region	May 2023	Activist	Released in bail as of May 12, 2023	Part of crackdown and mass arbitrary arrest of Amhara journalists and activists in 2023.
Aynaddis Walelign	Debre Markos, Amhara region	May 3, 2023	Activist	Detained	Part of governments' crackdown and arbitrary arrest of Human rights defenders, and activists.
Mohammed Yimam	Hayk, South Wollo, Amhara region	Opposition leader	April 30, 2023	Detained and beaten as of May 11, 2023	Part of governments' crackdown and arbitrary arrest of Human rights defenders, and oppositions.
Infant of Keleb Seyoum (4-month-old infant)	Addis Ababa	Infant, child of Keleb Siyoum	April 30, 2023	Detained with her mother Contracted infection during detain and released when her mother bailed as of May 3, 2023	Part of crackdown and mass arbitrary arrest of Amhara opposition, journalists and activists in 2023.
Keleb Seyoum	Addis Ababa	Opposition officer, Balderas for True Democracy Party	April 30, 2023	Detained Released with bail (as of May 3, 2023)	Part of crackdown and mass arbitrary arrest of Amhara opposition, journalists and activists in 2023.
Ameha Dagnew	Not specified	Vice President of opposition, Balderas for True Democracy Party	April 18, 2023	Detained.	Part of crackdown and mass arbitrary arrest of Amhara journalists and activists in 2023.
Senayet Ayalew & Elias Debas	Bahir Dar, Amhara region	Ashara media internet broadcaster, journalist	April 13, 2023	Released in bail (as of April 27, 2023)	Part of crackdown and mass arbitrary arrest of Amhara journalists and activists in 2023.
Tewodros Asfaw	Addis Ababa	Ethio Selam internet broadcaster	April 13, 2023 Second arrest	Released in bail on June 10, 2023	Part of crackdown and mass arbitrary arrest of journalists and activists in 2023. Accused of inciting violence.
Dawit Begashaw	Bahir Dar, Amhara then transferred to Addis Ababa	Arat Killo YouTube channel, Founder	April 12, 2023	A freelance journalist	Part of mass arrest of Amhara journalists and activists.
Meskerem Abera	Addis Ababa	Ethio Nikat YouTube channel, Founder	April 9, 2023	Third arrest since 2022. Part of mass arrest of Amhara journalists and activists	Accused of giving alleged "shooting exercise" to informal groups.
Aleligne Mihretu	Not specified	Defense lawyer, represented Amhara detainees. Known for representing Colonel Demeke Zewdu, during EPRDF regime.	April 7, 2023	Released in bail as of April 25, 2023	Part of mass arrest of Amhara defenders.
Genet Asmamaw	Addis Ababa	Yeneta (Medlot) YouTube journalist	April 6, 2023	Abused by Addis Ababa police during arbitrary arrest. Detained	Part of mass arrest of Amhara journalists and activists.
Abay Zewdu	Addis Ababa	Amhara Media Center YouTube channel, editor-in-chief	April 6, 2023	Released in bail as of April 25, 2023	Accused of inciting violence & unrest.
Worku Tesfaye Woldemariam	Not specified	Activist	April 4, 2023	Detained	Part of crackdown and mass arbitrary arrest of Amhara journalists and activists in 2023.
Henok Addisu	Not specified	Activist	April 4, 2023	Detained.	Part of crackdown and mass arbitrary arrest of Amhara journalists and activists in 2023.
Tesfaye Yehualaeshet Fasil	Not specified	Activist	April 4, 2023	Detained	Part of crackdown and mass arbitrary arrest of Amhara journalists and activists in 2023.
Solomon Lemenih Ketema	Not specified	Activist	April 4, 2023	Detained	Part of crackdown and mass arbitrary arrest of Amhara journalists and activists in 2023.
Menbere	Not specified	Activist	April 4, 2023	Detained	Part of crackdown and mass arbitrary arrest of Amhara journalists and activists in 2023.
Dr. Bekele	Not specified	Activist	April 4, 2023	Detained	Part of crackdown and mass arbitrary arrest of Amhara journalists and activists in 2023.
Dawit Ababu Bitew	Addis Ababa	Activist	April 4, 2023	Detained	Part of crackdown and mass arbitrary arrest of Amhara journalists and activists in 2023.
Tadesse Weyinew Tessema	Addis Ababa	Activist	April 4, 2023	Detained	Part of crackdown and mass arbitrary arrest of Amhara journalists and activists in 2023.
Muluken Wonde Bitew	Addis Ababa	Activist	April 4, 2023	Detained	Part of crackdown and mass arbitrary arrest of Amhara journalists and activists in 2023.
Tewodros Teshome Ayenew	Addis Ababa	Activist	April 4, 2023	Detained	Part of crackdown and mass arbitrary arrest of Amhara journalists and activists in 2023.
Samuel Assefa	Addis Ababa	EMS (Ethiopian Media Services), reporter	April 4, 2023	Detained	For reporting the demolition of residential houses in Addis Ababa.
Maeregu Biyabeyen	Not specified	assistant professor	April 2023	Detained	Part of mass arrest of Amhara defenders.
Sisay Awgichew	Not specified	assistant professor, and Shewa Peace and Development Association, Leadership	April 2023	Detained	Part of mass arrest of Amhara defenders.
Assefa Adane (PhD)	Not specified	assistant professor and Negere Wolkait Media editor	April 2023	Detained	Part of mass arrest of Amhara defenders.
Aragaw Sisay	Addis Ababa	Roha News (YouTube streaming media), Founder and Editor-in-chief	March 26, 2023	Released in bail as of April 25, 2023	Accused of terrorism and inciting violence on social media.
Getenet Ashagre	Addis Ababa	Voice of Amhara YouTube-based broadcaster, Editor-in-chief	March 26, 2023	Released in bail as of April 25, 2023	Accused of inciting of violence on social media. Charges not specified.
Beyene Wolde	Addis Ababa	Gurage Media Network news website, Founder and editor	March 2, 2023	Still detained as of March 22, 2023	Accused of terrorism and incitement.
Eskinder Nega	Bahir Dar, Amhara Region	Journalist, activist, and founder and former Balderas for True Democracy Party leader	February 24, 2023. In the past 30 years, he was imprisoned numerous times.	Released in February 26 (or 27), 2023	Charges not specified.
Tewodros Asfaw	Addis Ababa	Ethio Selam internet broadcaster	February 14, 2023 First arrest	Released on bail on February 18, 2023 (RSF reported February 22, 2023. Has left the country)	Accused of inciting violence and sowing distrust of the government related to the attack against the Ethiopian Orthodox Tewahedo Church.
Amanuel Asfaw	Addis Ababa	Ethio Selam internet broadcaster	February 14, 2023	Still in custody as of February 18, 2023	Accused of inciting violence and sowing distrust of the government related to the attack against the Ethiopian Orthodox Tewahedo Church.
Meseret Tamiru	Addis Ababa	Ethio Selam internet broadcaster	February 14, 2023	Still in custody as of February 18, 2023	Accused of inciting violence and sowing distrust of the government related to the attack against the Ethiopian Orthodox Tewahedo Church.
Yosef Ketema (Deacon)	Addis Ababa	EOTC TV— Oromo language reporter	February 13, 2023	Released on February 21, 2023	Accused of terrorism and inciting violence for covering a split related to the attack against the Ethiopian Orthodox Tewahedo Church.
Sentayehu Chekol	Addis Ababa	Member of the Balderas opposition party	February 12, 2023	Released on April 11, 2023, following the mass Amhara protest in the country	Part of the crackdown of members of the Ethiopian Orthodox Tewahedo Church.
Daniel Tesfaye	Addis Ababa	EHRCO's human rights officer	January 5, 2023	Unknown	Arrested for investigating illegal evictions and demolitions in Addis Ababa.
Bezuayehu Wondimu	Addis Ababa	EHRCO's human rights officer	January 5, 2023	Unknown	Arrested for investigating illegal evictions and demolitions in Addis Ababa.
Bereket Daniel	Addis Ababa	EHRCO's human rights officer	January 5, 2023	Unknown	Arrested for investigating illegal evictions and demolitions in Addis Ababa.
Nahom Husen	Addis Ababa	EHRCO's human rights officer	January 5, 2023	Unknown	Arrested for investigating illegal evictions and demolitions in Addis Ababa.

Yidnekachew Kebede (Addis Ababa) (Activist lawyer, Social Media Influencer and Journalist) (Arrested on August 17, 2023 and released on September 1, 2023) (Reason: Part of the crackdown on Amhara activists and cause) https://www.voanews.com/a/ethiopia-arrests-3-journalists-under-new-state-of-emergency/7258701.html

== See also ==
- Human rights in Ethiopia
