= Eskinder Nega =

Ethiopian politician and rebel leader (born 1969)

- እስክንድር ነጋ
- Eskinder Nega in 2018

Leader of the Amhara People's Army
- Incumbent
- Assumed office 20 May 2023
- Preceded by: position established

Chairperson of Balderas For Genuine Democracy Party
- In office September 2019 – 11 August 2022
- Preceded by: position established
- Succeeded by: Amaha Dagnew

Personal details
- Born: 7 November 1969 (age 56) Addis Ababa, Ethiopian Empire
- Spouse: Serkalem Fasil
- Children: 1
- Education: Addis Ababa University
- Occupation: Journalist; politician; blogger; political activist
- Awards: Oxfam Novib/PEN Award

Military service
- Allegiance: Fano
- Years of service: 2023–present
- Commands: Amhara People's Army
- Battles/wars: War in Amhara

Eskinder Nega (Amharic: እስክንድር ነጋ, born 7 November 1969) is an Ethiopian politician and rebel leader of the Fano militia.

Born in Addis Ababa to educated parents, Eskinder attended to Stanford School in Addis Ababa then moved to American University to study in college. Upon the Derg regime fall in 1991, he has worked with journalist and blogger. He founded newspapers like Askual, Satenaw, and Menelik. Eskinder has been subjected to conviction and imprisonment by the Ethiopian government under EPRDF rule for alleged treason and terrorism following the 2005 general election. He was also convinced in 2012 for terrorism allegation. A new government under Abiy Ahmed premiership released many political prisoners and opposition leaders behind the government of EPRDF, and he was released in February 2018.

In September 2019, Eskinder founded the Balderas Party and became a chairman thereafter until he left in August 2022. He was again imprisoned during the protest after the murder of singer Hachalu Hundessa in June 2020 for "inciting violence and chaos", and freed in January 2022. In 2023, the disagreement between the Ethiopian government and regional special forces in Amhara region ignited Fano insurgency. Eskinder then formed and led Fano's main command named Amhara People's Army since May 2023.

== Early life ==
Eskinder was born to highly educated parents, his father having done graduate work at Rutgers University and his mother at the American University of Beirut. They eventually divorced and his mother, with whom Eskinder lived, opened a clinic. Eskinder is of Amhara origin.

Eskinder attended Sandford School in Addis Ababa. Eskinder moved to the United States in 1980s where he attended college, then studied economics at American University.

== Career ==
Eskinder returned to Ethiopia in 1991 after the Marxist Derg was ousted by EPRDF forces. In fact he became one of the adversaries to the regime in the years to come He founded his first newspaper, Ethiopis, in 1993. He also founded other newspapers such as, Askual, Satenaw, and Menelik.

=== 2005: Treason conviction ===
As editor of the newspaper Satenaw, Eskinder was arrested on 28 November 2005 following demonstrations against the results of the Ethiopian general election on 15 May 2005. Nega was charged with the capital offenses of treason, "outrages against the Constitution" and "incitement to armed conspiracy". Amnesty International designated him a prisoner of conscience, "detained solely for exercising his right to freedom of expression", and called for his immediate release. The group also protested the "poor and unsanitary" conditions of his detention at Karchele prison.

Eskinder was found guilty and served seventeen months' imprisonment before being released by presidential pardon at the end of 2007. Following the conviction, Nega's license to practice journalism was revoked and his newspaper was closed by authorities in 2007. He instead began to publish online.

=== 2012: Terrorism conviction ===
Eskinder was arrested again along with four politicians on 14 September 2011 after publishing a column that criticized both the Ethiopian government's detainment of journalists as suspected terrorists and its arrest of Ethiopian actor and activist Debebe Eshetu. Ethiopian anti-terrorism legislation prohibits "any reporting deemed to 'encourage' or 'provide moral support' to groups and causes the government deems 'terrorists'".

Eskinder and his co-defendants, including Andualem Aragie, were accused of involvement in Ginbot 7, a group that was recently added to Ethiopian list of terrorist organizations. In November, he and his co-defendants were accused by state media of being "spies for foreign forces". He was found guilty of terrorism charges on 23 January 2012. On 13 July 2012, Eskinder was sentenced to eighteen years in jail on charges of terrorism. In 2013, a UN panel found Eskinder Nega's jailing a violation of international law.

After delaying a decision on seven occasions, the Federal Supreme Court upheld Eskinder's 18-year sentence on 1 May 2013. On 24 July 2013, Eskinder's "Letter from Ethiopia's Gulag" was published as a New York Times op-ed.

=== 2018–2020: Release, further arrests and release again ===
In January 2018, the prison holding Eskinder Nega was announced to be shut down, with political prisoners freed in order to "foster national reconciliation". He was only allowed freedom if he signed a confession saying that he was a member of the Ginbot 7 group designated terrorists by the federal government; but Eskinder refused, saying that it was a false confession. Eskinder Nega was freed on 14 February 2018, along with several other political prisoners. He then launched Ethiopis, a weekly Amharic newspaper.

On the evening of 25 March 2018, the Ethiopian Security Forces have re-arrested Eskinder and other journalists and politicians at a social event outside the capital, Addis Ababa. Eskinder was accused of displaying a prohibited national flag and gathering in violation of an official state of emergency but was later released without a charge on the evening of 5 April after spending twelve days of unwarranted, inhumane imprisonment.

In September 2019, Eskinder Nega founded Balderas for True Democracy Party.

On 25 April 2020, Eskinder was once again arrested by Addis Ababa Police on grounds that are yet to be specified but released the same day. On 30 June 2020, he was arrested again during the Hachalu Hundessa riots for inciting violence and chaos.

On 7 January 2022, during Orthodox Christmas, Eskinder Nega has been freed after one and half year in prison.

On 20 April 2022, Eskinder and other members of Balderas for True Democracy Party were arrested in Arba Minch town while the party was gathering signatures to expand their party to other areas outside of Addis Ababa.

=== 2023–present: Leading Fano insurgency ===
Nega is currently the leader of the Amhara People's Army faction of the Fano insurgency which is fighting against the government in the Amhara region. During the summer of 2024, an attempt to integrate Fano forces under a single leadership was made and Nega was named head of the organization. However his leadership was rejected by several factions within Fano, and as of August 2024 no unified leadership had been established for the group.

== Awards and honors ==
- 2012 PEN/Barbara Goldsmith Freedom to Write Award
- 2014 World Association of Newspapers' Golden Pen of Freedom Award
- 2017 International Press Institute World Press Freedom Hero
- 2018 Oxfam Novib/PEN Award

== See also ==
- Temesgen Desalegn
- Andualem Aragie
- Reeyot Alemu
- Daniel Bekele
- Arena Tigray
- Bekele Gerba
- Habtamu Ayalew
- List of detained journalists and activists in Ethiopia (2023)
