= Temesgen Desalegn =

Ethiopian journalist

- ተመስገን ደሳለኝ
- Born: Ethiopian
- Occupation: Journalist
- Organization: Feteh
- Known for: Imprisoned journalist: Editor for Feteh and Le’elina newspapers; Prisoner of conscience (Amnesty International)

Temesgen Desalegn (Amharic: ተመስገን ደሳለኝ) is an Ethiopian journalist.

== Background ==
As an editor of the independent weekly newspaper Feteh, Desalegn went to court many times and was imprisoned from 2014 to 2017 as a result of his criticism of the national government, drawing protests on his behalf from the international press freedom groups Committee to Protect Journalists and Article 19 and from Amnesty International. In its 2014 report, the U.S. Department of State also reported its concern against Temsgen's 3 years sentence by the government, emphasizing that Freedom of expression and freedom of the press are fundamental elements of a democratic society and government. The Human Rights Watch also reported his charge in August 2012 and his three years sentence in 2014.

== Journalism ==
Desalegn was the Chief Editor of Feteh, which was created in 2008 until its closure by Ethiopian authorities in 2012. In 2013 he wrote in the Ethiopian Review in support of fellow journalist Eskinder Nega and criticised the Ethiopian court system as "Meles Zenawi's kangaroo court". HRW also reported that Temsgen worked as journalist for Feteh and Le’elina newspapers, and for the Addis Times Ethiopian magazine prior to his 2012 imprisonment.

== Legal cases and detentions ==
=== 2022 ===
On May 26, 2022, Temsgen was charged with the new Prosperity Party regime and accused of disclosing military secrets. On July 4, 2022, the Federal Supreme Court granted him bail without release. However, the persecutor appealed to continue holding Temsgen to prevent “leaking secrets.” CPJ condemned his imprisonment and the abuse of the judicial system while calling on the government to drop the charges and stop criminalizing journalism. He was imprisoned for 7 months at the Kilinto prison and released with bail in November 2022. VOA reported the release with bail and that the court didn't communicate a date for the next appearance.

=== 2017–2018 ===
Desalegn was freed after three years of imprisonment in mid-October 2017. On 25 March 2018, he was arrested again and held in a 5-metre by 8-metre room with around 200 other detainees. He was then admitted to hospital due to severe back pain.

== Three years sentence (2014) ==
The U.S. Department of State reported that Temsgen was sentenced to three years for "provocation and dissemination of inaccurate information.” The report also emphasized its concern about the rights violations against the journalist, stating that Freedom of expression and freedom of the press are fundamental elements of a democratic society and government. In addition to his conviction, HRW also reported that Temsgen's family faced repeated harassment and threats.

=== 2012 ===
On 4 May 2012, Desalegn was found guilty of contempt of court after Feteh published the full text of a courtroom statement by independent journalist Eskinder Nega, who was on trial for terrorism charges. In the statement, Nega asserted his innocence and criticized the charges against him. Desalegn was given a suspended four-month prison term and a 2,000 birr (US$113) fine. CPJ protested the sentence, calling it an example of "growing severity of censorship in Ethiopia".

In July 2012, Feteh was closed by government order, and 30,000 copies of the paper were seized. A prosecutor stated that the paper's coverage had been found to be "detrimental to the country’s national security".

On 10 August, Desalegn learned through a radio broadcast that he was being charged under three articles of Ethiopia's Criminal Code: Article 613, "defamation and calumny"; Article 486, "inciting the public through false rumours"; and Article 238, "outrages against the Constitution or the Constitutional Order", a capital offense. The charges were in response to articles published in August 2011, February 2012, and March 2012, in which Feteh had reported on youth protests against the government. The UK-based anti-censorship organization Article 19 issued a statement in support of Desalegn and called for the charges to be dropped.

On 23 August, three days after the death of long-time prime minister Meles Zenawi, Desalegn was arrested on defamation charges as part of a general crackdown on government critics. According to Amnesty International, he was the first journalist to be arrested since Zenawi's death. The organization described the arrest as "a worrying signal that the government intends to carry on targeting dissent", stating that Desalegn appeared to have been arrested "for exercising his right to freedom of expression in advocating for peaceful protests to take place, among other criticisms of the government". CPJ also called for Desalegn's release, stating, "Temesghen is not a criminal for expressing his constitutional right to freedom of expression."

The government dropped the charges against him without comment on 29 August, and he was released from prison. The charges against Temesgen's publisher were also dropped, but Temsegen stated it was uncertain when Feteh would be able to restart publishing.

In October 2012, Feteh and opposition party newspaper Finote Netsanet reported that the state-owned printer had refused to continue printing their papers, and that independent printers had canceled their contracts. Temesgen stated that one printer had stated it had been ordered by the Ministry of Justice to no longer print Feteh. The newspaper was unable to print copies for several weeks.

=== 2008–2011 ===
According to the US-based Committee to Protect Journalists (CPJ), between 2008 and July 2011, the Ethiopian government filed 41 lawsuits against Desalegn.
