= Dawit Kebede =

Ethiopian journalist

- ዳዊት ከበደ
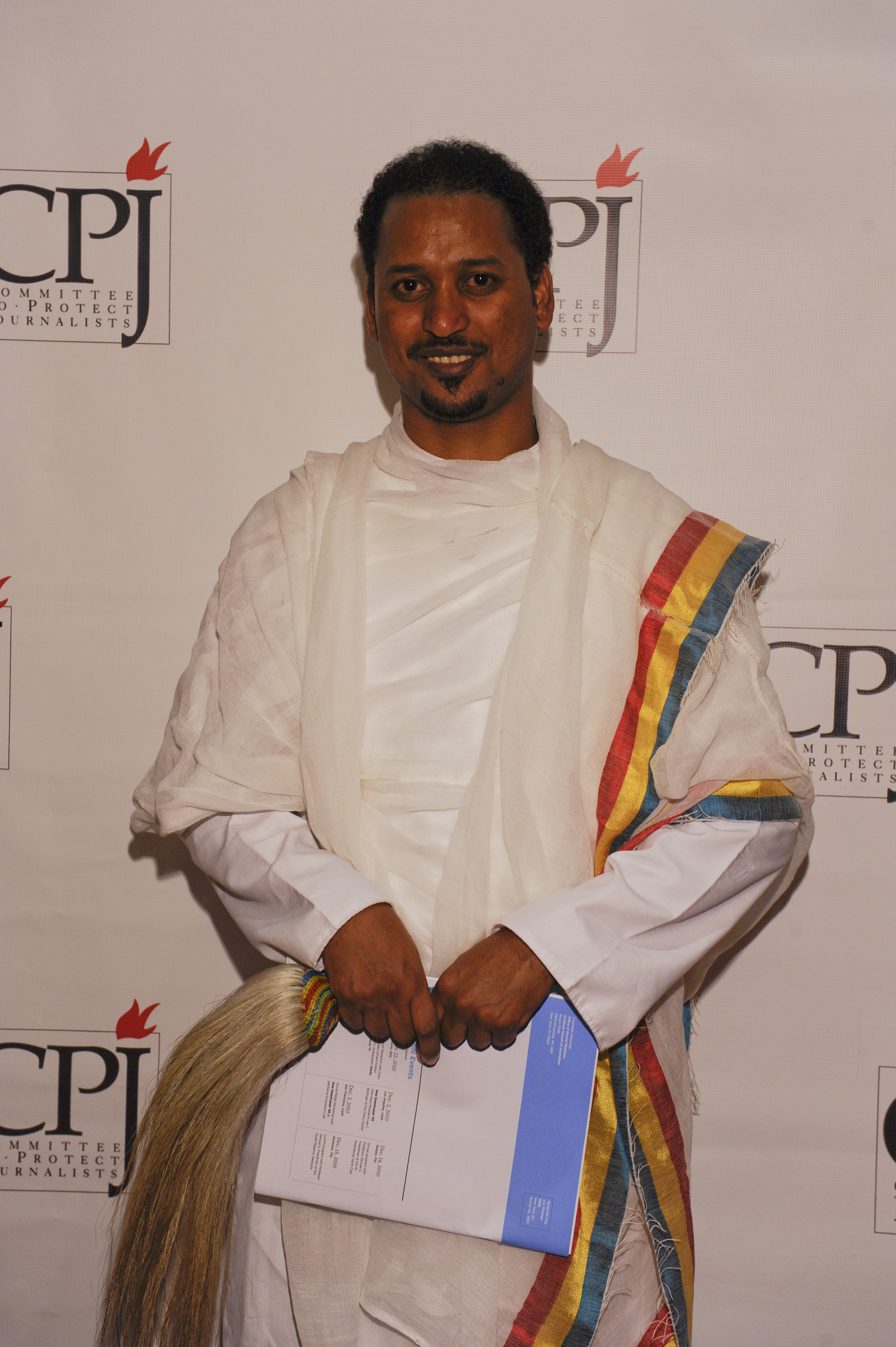
- Kebede at the 2010 ceremony for the CPJ International Press Freedom Awards
- Born: 11 September 1980 (age 46); Adwa Ethiopia
- Education: Unity University
- Occupation: Journalist
- Awards: CPJ International Press Freedom Award (2010)

Dawit Kebede (Amharic: ዳዊት ከበደ; born 11 September 1980 in Adwa) is an Ethiopian journalist who spent 21 months as a political prisoner after criticising his country's government in the lead up to the 2005 general election. He was released on a presidential pardon nearly two years later and sought asylum in the United States in 2011. He returned to Ethiopia in 2014. Dawit was awarded the 2010 CPJ International Press Freedom Award for his dedication to journalism.

== Early career ==
Dawit was born in Adwa Ethiopia but grew up in Addis Ababa, the oldest of three children. He received his BA in journalism from Unity University and a Master's from Arizona State University's Walter Cronkite School of Journalism and Mass Communication. He started his career as a columnist in Ethiopian newspapers on socio-political issues in 2001, followed by a stint at Habesha Journal, a bilingual health magazine. In 2004, after Habesha folded, he founded and became editor-in-chief of Hadar magazine. Hadar became popular due to its critical analysis of Ethiopian politics, including of Prime Minister Meles Zenawi's government.

During the 2005 Ethiopian general election, police opened gunfire in June 2005 against unarmed opposition supporters in Addis Ababa. On 8 June, Dawit published an article in Hadar condemning the government's response to the protestors. In it, he referring to article 15 of the nation's constitution: "Every person has the right to life. No person may be deprived of his life except as a punishment for a serious criminal offence determined by law." Hadar was subsequently banned and he was arrested that November along with senior leaders of the then-leading opposition group, Coalition for Unity and Democracy, for alleged involvement in the demonstrations. The group was also charged with "genocide, attempt to subvert the constitutional system [and] high treason."

In 2007, after nearly two years in prison, he pleaded guilty to "inciting and conspiring to commit outrages to the constitutional order." He was given a life sentence before being released from Kality Prison on a conditional pardon along with journalist Wosonseged Gebrekidan of Addis Zena on 20 July 2007. While many editors and journalists decided to flee the country after their pardon, Dawit decided to remain. The government initially denied him a publishing license, which would allow him to continue his work, but eventually granted it after public pressure.

In March 2008, Dawit began publishing the Awramba Times newspaper, described by the Committee to Protect Journalists (CPJ) in 2010 as the "country's only Amharic-language newspaper that dares question authorities" and by CNN's Diane McCarthy as "one of Ethiopia's last remaining independent publications" in 2011. Dawit was awarded the CPJ's International Press Freedom Award in November 2010 to honor his work and commitment, specifically "risking his freedom and security in the course of his reporting." In June 2011, CNN covered his story as part of its AfricanVoices program. During the interview, Diwa said that the Ethiopian press existed in a climate of fear, claiming that, after the 2005 election, it wasn't "easy for journalists in Ethiopia to do their work independently." The same month, Awramba's deputy editor, Woubshet Taye, was imprisoned on terrorism charges, which CPJ determined was due to his work at Awramba. He served seven years before being pardoned in 2018.

== Exile and return ==
In November 2011, Dawit was given a tip-off that the Ministry of Justice and the Government Communication Affairs was planning to revoke his pardon and put him back in prison. This followed Addis Zemen's publication about him, a smear column alleging him of being linked to terrorist organisations and demanding the government and security forces "take action" against him. He had sued the newspaper earlier in the year for defamation but the judge threw out the case in July. After Dawit fled to the United States, a representative of the Ministry of Justice and a federal prosecutor both denied that any plans for his arrest existed. While Awramba Times ceased publication when he left the country, he relaunched it as an online newspaper based in Washington, D.C. in May 2012.

In July 2013, Horn Affairs reported that Dawit had fallen out of favour with opposition groups, particularly the right wing, who called him a "government agent." Zehabesha.com accused him of secretly meeting with Ethiopia's foreign minister, Tedros Adhanom, at the Ethiopian Embassy in Washington, which Dawit refuted by providing plane tickets showing he had been in Arizona at the time of the purported meeting. Seemingly in retaliation, Awramba published more pieces criticising major opposition personalities and leaked a recording of Berhanu Nega discussing a bribe he had received from Eritrea to finance Ginbot 7's "military activities", the online network ESAT and "domestic peaceful struggles and diplomatic activities".

In October 2014, after two years in the U.S., Dawit announced his decision to hand over his asylum papers and return home, saying that, while he had reasonable grounds to flee, the problems were "not insurmountable" in hindsight. He added that the difficulty of doing journalistic work from abroad was the main deciding factor. He continued to manage the Awramba Times after his return to Ethiopia.

The Tigray War 2020

Tigray war was one of the challenging moments for Dawit Kebede. He used to continuously disclose News and information on Awramba Times' official youtube channel (100k plus subscribers) and on his social media platforms such as Twitter, (79K followers) and on his verified personal facebook account (250k followers) on these platforms his main topics were related to ethnic profiling of Tigrayans; Tigrayan refugees being stopped from fleeing to Sudan; and Abiy Ahmed's mischaracterisation of the refugees' demographics. On 30 November 2020, Dawit was detained at a restaurant in Addis Ababa for publishing "false information" and damaging the government's image. He was ordered to appear in court on 2 December and 15 December. On his first court date, he was accused of "disseminating inaccurate information, inciting violence, and attempting to violate the constitution", and the police were granted permission to hold him for 13 days while the investigation continued. The second date saw him accused of working with opposition media that aligned with the Tigray People's Liberation Front, spreading false information through social media and inciting violence on his Twitter page. The police were allowed to keep him in custody for 10 more days. His next court date was set for 10 January 2021. After repeated court appearances, the judge granted his release on a 50,000 ETB bail on January 29, 2021.

Immediately following his release, Dawit returned to his professional duties. One of his notable early works was an exclusive interview with the Ethiopian Human Rights Chief Commissioner, Daniel Bekelle (PhD). In this interview, Dawit challenged the commissioner on the organization's response to widespread atrocities in Tigray following the outbreak of the war, including mass killings in Axum, Mariam Dengelat, and other areas.

Focusing primarily on human rights and accountability, Dawit also interviewed former U.S. Ambassador to Ethiopia David Shinn regarding the U.S. government’s perceived reluctance to address the atrocities in Tigray.

In addition to his role as Managing Editor at Awramba Times, Dawit has contributed articles on various topics to prominent Ethiopian media outlets. A notable piece, titled "The Erasure of Tigrayans and Amharanisation of Western Tigray," was published in the Tghat online journal on September 30, 2023. In it, Dawit detailed the controversial situation in Western Tigray, documenting how Tigrayans faced death and inhumane treatment after war broke out on November 4, 2020. He argued that while an alleged attack on the Northern Command served as the official casus belli for the military campaign, the Ethiopian federal government had already been signaling its readiness for war. The conflict involved the Ethiopian National Defense Force (ENDF), Eritrean forces (EDF), and allied Amhara regional forces, including local militias, Amhara Special Forces, and the informal armed group Fano.

Dawit noted that the broader campaign targeted institutional memory—destroying schools, hospitals, archives, and databases, while demolishing approximately 75% of Tigray's water infrastructure. Citing research from institutions such as Ghent University, the article highlighted devastating civilian casualties and noted that sexual violence against Tigrayan women was weaponized to destroy the region's social fabric.

When Tigray faced severe drought, Dawit authored an op-ed in Addis Standard on January 13, 2024, titled "Dying in Silence: Tigray’s unprecedented famine and government apathy." The piece addressed the region's severe famine and criticized official inaction. Citing internal government documents, Dawit reported over 2,000 starvation deaths.

On May 25, 2024, Dawit published another piece in The Reporter, titled "Tigray's post-war trauma: A struggle for healing amidst political discord." Here, he detailed the challenges of post-war psychological recovery in Tigray, compounded by ongoing political conflict and division.

Dawit continues to work as a journalist based in Addis Ababa.
