= Hailu Shawul =

Ethiopian politician and civil engineer (1936–2016)

Hailu Shawul ሃይሉ ሻዉል
- Born: 1936; Shewa, Ethiopia
- Died: 6 October 2016 (aged 79–80); Bangkok, Thailand
- Education: Wayne State University
- Occupations: Politician; Civil engineer
- Political party: Coalition for Unity and Democracy (2005–2007); All Ethiopian Unity Party (1996–2014)

Hailu Shawul (also spelled Shawel or Shawil; Ge'ez: ሃይሉ ሻዉል; 1936 – 6 October 2016) was an Ethiopian politician and civil engineer who was the leader of the Coalition for Unity and Democracy (CUD) during the 2005 Ethiopian general election. He was also the leader of All Ethiopian Unity Party from 1996 to 2013. He died on 6 October 2016, while receiving treatment at a hospital in Bangkok, Thailand.

== Early life ==
Hailu was born in northern Shewa, Ethiopia. He attended elementary and high school in Addis Ababa at Minilik II School. At the age of 18 he moved to the United States to pursue higher education and enrolled at Wayne State University. He did both his bachelor's and master's degree in Civil Engineering and returned to Ethiopia in 1960 soon after his graduation.

He was married to Almaz Zewde whom he met at his friend's wedding. They had six children together.

== Professional career ==
After returning to Ethiopia, Hailu started his career as a research engineer at Abay Gorge by working with the team who has been studying about the gorge in a project funded by the US government. Following that he worked for 13 years in the different managerial positions at Shell international.

In 1973–1974 at the height of the Ethiopian student movement, Hailu was appointed as head of Ethiopian Transportation Authority and served for three years. Following the Somalia invasion on Ethiopia in 1977 he was called for national service and participated in designing an aircraft for the Ethiopian air force.

After the Somali war was ended by Ethiopian victory, Hailu was appointed general manager of Ethiopian Sugar Corporation and managing director of Wonji Sugar Company and Metehara Sugar Company and then Minister for State Farms Development of Ethiopia, at the height of Qey Shibir or Red Terror. In mid-1978, Hailu absconded in exile to the United States. In 1983 Hailu formed a successful company, Shawel Consultancy inc, which is now run by his economist son Shawel Hailu. Until his return to Ethiopia to join politics He was general manager of Shawl Consultancy which conducted construction work in cooperation with international institutions such as UN, and African Development Bank.

== Political career ==
Hailu Shawul joined politics by succeeding Professor Asrat Woldeyes as the head of the All-Amhara People's Organization (AAPO). However, some sources dispute his presidency and show that the AAPO's split into two factions - the All Ethiopian Unity Party (AEUP) and the United Ethiopian Democratic Party-Medhin - was due to Hailu Shawel not gaining the presidency and thus creating his own party. Many believe that the division was tactically mediated by the EPRDF government interference.

Late in 2004, a year before 2005 general election, a series of negotiations started among Hailu Shawul, Lidetu Ayalew, leader of Ethiopian Democratic Party, Berhanu Nega, the then leader of Rainbow Ethiopia: Movement for Democracy and Social Justice, and Chekol Getahun, the leader of Ethiopian Democratic League, which led to the formation of Coalition for Unity and Democracy. Hailu was elected leader of the CUD to challenge the ruling EPRDF party on 2005 general election.

During 2005 Ethiopian general election, the CUD under Hailu's leadership was able to win 137 out of 138 seats of the Addis Ababa city council and 109 seats in the federal parliament. The result was disputed both by the ruling EPRDF and CUD. Following the dispute and alleged voting irregularities Observers from the European Union assessed that closing and counting processes negatively in almost half of urban polling stations, counting was slow, a remarkably high number of ballots were ruled invalid, and there was a lack of transparency in the results. The situation deteriorated further as the negotiation between EPRDF and CUD fall apart and finally on late October 2005, protest erupted across the country against the ruling party.

As a result of the protests, the government placed Hailu Shawul and other high-ranking leaders under house arrest for weeks. When the CUD held an initially peaceful protest the highly armed government security forces augmented the situation by using excessive force which turned it violent, leading to the deaths of more than 200 peaceful demonstrators in the capital alone and an unknown number in the countryside in October 2005. The government claimed the death of four police officers. Hailu Shawel and 23 other CUD leaders were arrested and imprisoned on charges of treason and genocide[Wenedesen S].

While in imprisoned, in December 2005, Hailu Shawul with other CUD prisoners went on a hunger strike, which has aggravated his diabetes and threatens his vision. As a result of the hunger strike, Hailu Shawul has lost much of his sight, and gained access to medical care only after being visited by foreign diplomats.

In December 2007 the Federal Supreme Court of Ethiopia pardoned all twenty-four of the CUD members after they pleaded guilty and made public apologies; his fellow CUD member, Birtukan Mideksa, who was imprisoned and pardoned with him, claims that their pleas and apologies were coerced.

== Illness and death ==
After being freed from prison, Hailu Shawul traveled to America in January 2008 to get medical care for his diabetes. In mid-2013 he resigned from his tenure as leader of All Ethiopian Unity Party due to his deteriorating health condition.

From 2014 to 2016 he spent his time abroad receiving medical treatment. On 6 October 2016, Hailu died while receiving treatment at a hospital in Bangkok, Thailand.

== Notes ==
Wenedesen S.
