= Ethnic discrimination in Ethiopia =

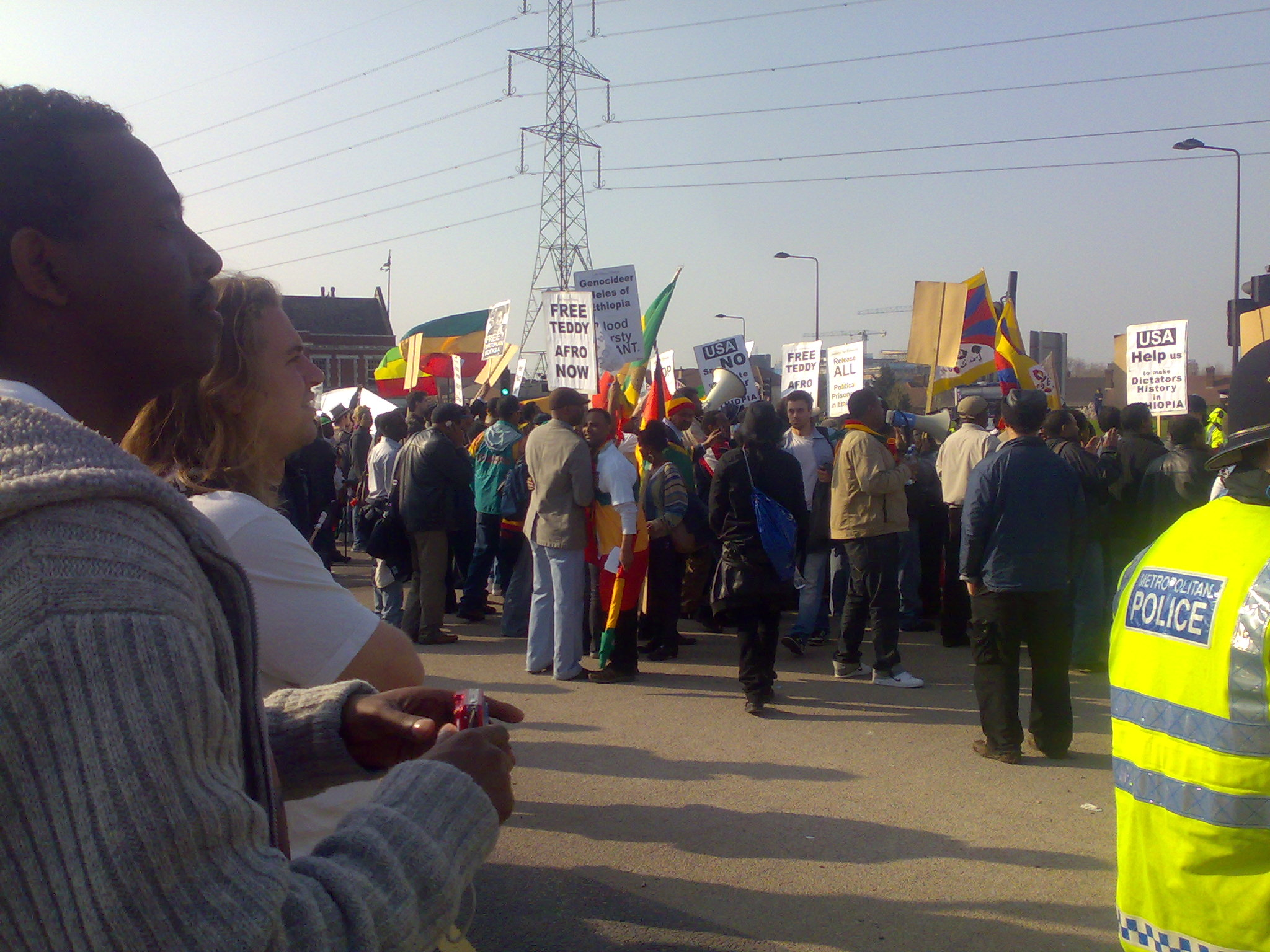
Protestors demand democratization in Ethiopia at the 2009 G20 protests outside the ExCel Centre in London

Ethnic discrimination in Ethiopia during and since the Haile Selassie epoch has been described using terms including "racism", "ethnification", "ethnic identification, ethnic hatred, ethnicization", and "ethnic profiling". During the Haile Selassie period, Amhara elites perceived the southern minority languages as an obstacle to the development of an Ethiopian national identity. Ethnic discrimination occurred during the Haile Selassie and Mengistu Haile Mariam epochs against Hararis, Afars, Tigrayans, Eritreans, Somalis and Oromos. Ethnic federalism was implemented by Tigray People's Liberation Front (TPLF) leader Meles Zenawi and discrimination against Amharas, Ogaden, Oromos and other ethnic groups continued during TPLF rule. Liberalisation of the media after Abiy Ahmed became prime minister in 2018 led to strengthening of media diversity and strengthening of ethnically focused hate speech. Ethnic profiling targeting Tigrayans occurred during the Tigray war that started in November 2020.

== Ethiopian Empire and Derg ==
Data from the Minorities at Risk (MAR) project were used by Charles E. Riddle to study the degrees of discrimination by the dominant Amharas against the non-dominant ethnic groups in Ethiopia from 1950 to 1992, during the later reign of Emperor Haile Selassie and that of Mengistu Haile Mariam of the Derg. Amharas dominated during the Haile Selassie epoch. Systematic discrimination against Afars occurred throughout the period. Tigrayans were initially culturally assimilated with the Amharas, speaking Amharic, and suffered little discrimination. Under the Haile Selassie government, the Oromo language was legally banned from education, public speaking and use in administration. During the Haile Selassie regime, the Harari people were persecuted. The imperial forces ordered the confiscation of Harari property and mass arrests of Harari men, as a result an estimated 10,000 Hararis fled their homeland in 1948.

The Derg culturally rejected the Tigrayans, who decreased their usage of Amharic, reverting to Tigrinya, and discrimination against the Tigrayans became strong. Eritreans, treated by MAR and Riddle as an ethnic group, and Somalis were strongly discriminated against throughout the period. The Oromos were initially strongly discriminated against, but adopted Amharic as their official language when the Derg came to power, and discrimination against them dropped. Both the Haile Selassie and the Derg governments relocated numerous Amharas into southern Ethiopia where they served in government administration, courts, church and even in school, where Oromo texts were eliminated and replaced by Amharic. In the aftermath of the Ogaden War during the 70s, Hararis, Somalis and Oromo Muslims were targeted by the Derg Government.

== TPLF/EPRDF ==
Meles Zenawi of the Tigray People's Liberation Front (TPLF), who replaced the Derg in 1991, introduced a political restructuring of Ethiopia called ethnic federalism. Alemante G. Selassie, writing in The Yale Journal of International Law, argued that the new structure, formalised in the 1995 Constitution of Ethiopia, gave too much formal power to ethnicity. He recommended Nigeria and Switzerland as better examples of multi-lingual, multi-ethnic states in which ethnic diversity is de facto recognised in administrative and territorial structuring, but is overridden by smaller scale territorial divisions and is not given direct political authority.

Ethnic states that were not part of the core traditional Abyssinian realm such as the Afar, Somali and Harari regions were excluded from the ruling EPRDF coalition. Former house speaker Dawit Yohannes claimed parties were denied membership into EPRDF due to their Muslim religious affiliation.

Ethiopians classified as "ethnically Eritrean" were deported from Ethiopia to Eritrea in a program that started in June 1998, during the Eritrean-Ethiopian War. By January 1999, 52,000 "Eritrean" Ethiopians had been deported to Eritrea. The Ethiopian Human Rights Council protested against the deportations.

In 2001, 12,000 Amharas were expelled from Oromia Region.

As of 2003, Oromos, Amharas and other members of the majority population in the Harari Region were discriminated against in favour of the Harari people, constituting 7% of the residents of the region. Only those speaking the Harari language and showing Harari ethnicity on their identity cards were allowed to vote in regional elections. Academic Sarah Vaughn and Christophe van der Beken both explain that the Harari state was created to overturn the marginalization of Hararis within their homeland since the Abyssinian invasion of the Harar Emirate in 1887 which turned the Muslim city of Harar into an Amhara Christian military garrison.

In 2017, the Ethiopian Satellite Television station ESAT was argued by Zeray Wolqait to be a "Voice of Genocide". He stated that ESAT "call[ed] and encourag[ed] massacres of the population of Tigray and listing or threaten to list people who deserved to die and should be exterminated." Zeray stated that ESAT was run by the Ginbot 7. He quoted ESAT journalist Mesay Mekonnen calling for "drying the water so as to catch the fish" as a way of removing Tigrayan dominance in Ethiopia. Zeray interpreted this as a call for genocide against Tigrayans.

== Abiy Ahmed ==
In 2020, during the Abiy Ahmed, post-TPLF government of Ethiopia, Terje Skjerdal and Mulatu Alemayehu Moges found that freedom of print, broadcast and journalistic online media had increased greatly, but had also become highly polarised in terms of promoting ethnic nationalism. They found very strong growth in regional media, which tended to avoid or weaken reports on incidents showing "us" (the region and ethnicity with which a news medium is associated) negatively and to strengthen reports showing "them" (another region or ethnicity) as perpetrators of injustice. Online hate speech was found to have increased considerably, mostly originating from the Ethiopian diaspora in Western universities.

=== Tigray war ===
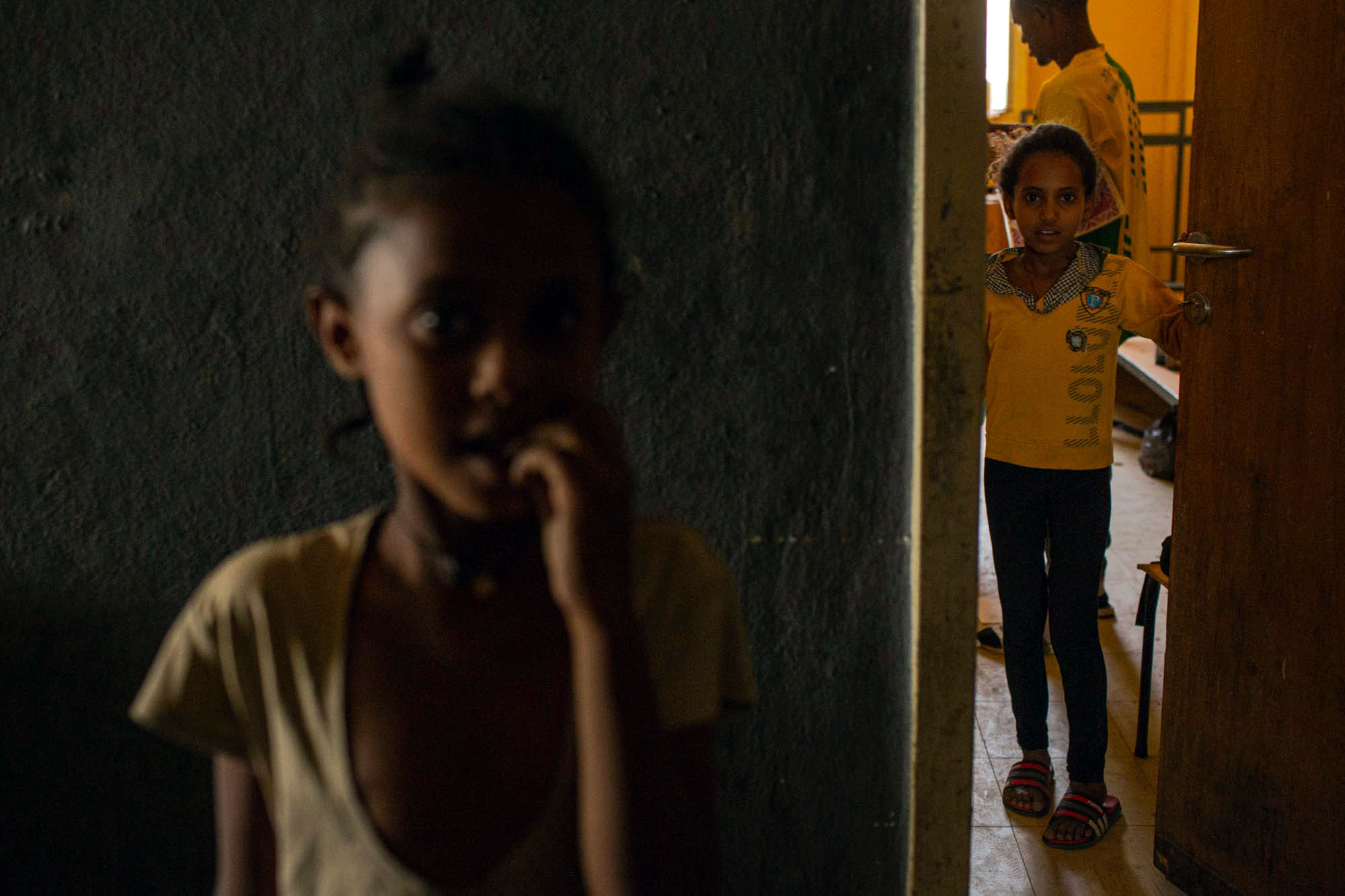
The Tigray conflict has separated more than 6,000 children from their parents

During the Tigray war that started in November 2020, ethnic profiling against Tigrayans occurred, with Ethiopians of Tigrayan ethnicity being put on indefinite leave from Ethiopian Airlines or refused permission to board, prevented from overseas travel, and an "order of identifying ethnic Tigrayans from all government agencies and NGOs" being used by federal police to request a list of ethnic Tigrayans from an office of the World Food Programme. Tigrayans' houses were arbitrarily searched and Tigrayan bank accounts were suspended. Ethnic Tigrayan members of Ethiopian components of United Nations peacekeeping missions were disarmed and some forcibly flown back to Ethiopia, at the risk of torture or execution, according to United Nations officials. On 31 January 2021, Semhal Meles, daughter of former prime minister Meles Zenawi, stated that she had been blocked from boarding a flight leaving Addis Ababa despite having valid documents. She stated that she was "illegally and unlawfully profiled." Semhal stated that in 2020, she had been detained by 20 armed police in Mekelle and held for 48 hours without access to a lawyer and without being informed of the reason for her detention. She was threatened with decapitation by one police officer. Semhal interpreted the arrest as being for the "dual crime, it seems, [of] being born into a political family with a Tigrayan identity.

The Ethiopian Human Rights Commission (EHRC) reported Tigrayans being forced to take leave from work and prevented from overseas travel. Tigrayan employees of Ethiopian Airlines – pilots, caterers, technicians and security guards – were told to return their identification badges to the airline and not return to work until further notice. The Daily Telegraph interviewed six Ethiopian Airlines employees, who estimated that 200 staff with "Tigrayan sounding names" had been put on indefinite leave. Staff member Kiros Alemu stated that passengers with Tigrayan names had been prevented from boarding flights. In early November, an office of the World Food Programme (WFP) was visited by federal police, who requested a list of ethnic Tigrayan staff based on an "order of identifying ethnic Tigrayans from all government agencies and NGOs". The WFP stated to the police that it doesn't identify staff by ethnicity. Federal authorities stated that the investigation related to "suspects linked to Tigrayan authorities, not Tigrayans" and that the reports of the visit were a "complete misrepresentation of the event". The head of security for the African Union headquarters, in Addis Ababa, Gebreegziabher Mebratu Melese, was fired based on recommendations by the Ethiopian Ministry of Defence in early November.

Human Rights Watch (HRW) reported Tigrayans having their homes arbitrarily searched by federal security forces. Bank accounts opened in the Tigray Region were suspended from mid-November to 3 December.

Tedros Adhanom Ghebreyesus, the head of the World Health Organization, a former senior member of the TPLF, was accused of trying to supply weapons to the TPLF. Tedros denied that he was taking sides, and stated that he was "only one side and that is the side of peace."

Around 200 to 300 Tigrayan soldiers participating in an African Union peacekeeping mission in Somalia had their weapons removed in early November. An official stated that the reason was "not ... due to ethnicity but due to infiltration of TPLF elements in various entities which is part of an ongoing investigation". Some of the Tigrayan soldiers in Ethiopian contributions to peacekeeping missions, including four in South Sudan and 40 in Somalia, were forcibly flown back to Ethiopia. United Nations officials expressed concern that the returning soldiers could be tortured or executed. The senior military attaché at Ethiopia's United Nations mission in New York, a Tigrayan, was also fired.

==== Detentions ====
According to Gedion Timotheos, at the time federal Attorney-General, about 700 ethnic Tigrayans were detained in Addis Ababa in November 2020, dropping to around 300 in December 2020, on suspicion of links to the Tigray People's Liberation Front (TPLF).

In April 2021, 500 ethnic Tigrayans were held in a detention centre in Addis Ababa, which Addis Standard interpreted as arbitrary arrest based on ethnic identity. A health worker who was one of the detainees said after his release that "a priest, two women with small children and a beggar" were among the detainees, and that conditions were "miserable", with around 30 detainees per room. Lawyer Desta Mesfin stated in May that none of the Tigrayan detainees had been brought before a judge.

In July 2021, a further wave of arrests of ethnic Tigrayans and of journalists took place. The EHRC stated that it was "monitoring the situation closely" and that "Such measures could aggravate the public's concerns on the risk of ethnic profiling." A federal police spokesperson stated that the police "did not and does not arrest citizens based on their identity unless otherwise they are involved in criminal acts."

Another wave of arrests of Tigrayans took place in early November 2021, including "dozens of priests, monks, deacons and others" of Tigrayan ethnicity arrested in Addis Ababa according to an Ethiopian Orthodox Church official. The Ethiopian Human Rights Commission stated that the "arrests appeared to be based on ethnicity". The New York Times said that the November mass detentions "swept up anyone of Tigrayan descent, many of whom had no ties to the rebels or even affinity for them," including "mothers with children and the elderly". The detainees were selected based on "a mix of hints: their surnames, details listed on identification cards and drivers licenses, even the way they speak Amharic..." Laetitia Bader of HRW described the state of emergency, which formally permitted the mass detentions, as "'legitimizing and legalizing unlawful practices' and creating a 'real climate of fear'."

==== Hate speech ====
Online hate speech increased in November 2021. Journalists, politicians and pro-federal-government activists used hate speech on online social media, calling ethnic Tigrayans "traitors", calling for neighbours to "weed" them, and calling for authorities to detain ethnic Tigrayans in "concentration camps".

In late November 2021, Andargachew Tsege, a federal Ethiopian government advisor and British citizen, made statements that researcher Mehari Taddele Maru interpreted as incitement to genocide. Andargachew stated to a crowd that soldiers should use "the most savage of cruelties". He stated, "I tell you, you must not hesitate from resorting to the most barbaric of cruelties when you face [Tigrayan armed forces]. You must be merciless, you must act beyond what our [ethnic] Amhara or Ethiopian cultural values permit."

==== International reactions ====
The United Nations High Commissioner for Human Rights expressed concern about the ethnic profiling of Tigrayans during the conflict.

=== Voting rights ===
Prior to the 2021 Ethiopian general election, the National Electoral Board of Ethiopia (NEBE) aimed to limit voting rights for Harari minorities living outside their region. This action was later reversed by the High Court of Ethiopia; nonetheless, it revealed attempts to undermine affirmative action.

== See also ==
- Tigray war massacres and other war crimes: Adigrat, Hagere Selam, Hitsats, Humera, Mai Kadra, Aksum
- Human rights in Ethiopia
- Slavery in Ethiopia
- Anti-Oromo sentiment
