= 2005 Ethiopian general election violence =

Incident following the 2005 Ethiopian general election

- Addis Ababa, (Ethiopia)
- Date: 7 June – November 2005
- Location: Addis Ababa, Ethiopia
- Caused by: Arrest of college student Mesafint Endalew at the main campus
- Methods: Mainly sporadic protests

Casualties
- Deaths: 193
- Injuries: +763
- Arrested: 30,000

The 2005 Ethiopian general election violence, known generally as the Ethiopian police massacre, refers to the killing of civilians by government forces during June and November 2005 which led to the deaths of 193 protesters and injury of 763 others, mostly in the capital Addis Ababa, following the May 2005 elections in Ethiopia. More than 30,000 people were detained by security forces following the election, most released in 2006.

The first violent incident was flashed on 7 June 2005 at 11:20 when the police force had arrested one 4th year student Mesafint Endalew, at the main campus. Following the arrest many students marched to the police station in the camp. Despite the student released in the moment, the students immediately escalate their question towards the election votes.

Protests of the results were supposedly led by the Coalition for Unity and Democracy (CUD), began on 1 November 2005, and have prompted more than 60,000 arrests. Live gunfire from government forces has been directed at protesters and bystanders. All the top opposition leaders were arrested, as was the mayor-elect of Addis Ababa.

== Aftermath ==
=== Death toll ===
On October 18, 2006, an independent report said Ethiopian police massacred 193 protesters. The information was leaked before the official independent report was handed to the parliament. The leak made by Ethiopian judge Wolde-Michael Meshesha found that the government had concealed the true extent of deaths at the hands of the police. Gemechu Megerssa, a member of the independent Inquiry commission, whom Justice Meshesha once worked with, criticized Justice Wolde-Michael's act, stating that by taking the report "out of context and presenting it to the public to sensationalise the situation for his political end is highly unethical".

The official report described by the parliament and the government gave exactly the same details as the leaked inquiry. It said that 200 people had been killed, including 6 policemen. Some 763 people were also injured. Police records showed 20,000 people were initially arrested during the anti-government protests. The commission members living in Addis Ababa also criticised the government:

We are not saying the government was totally clean. The government has a lot to be accountable for. The mentality of the police needs to be changed, and then we will be able to minimize those kinds of casualties in the future. Building of [democratic] institutions is required, but that is going to take time. [So] The government was not prepared to tackle violence like that which took place last year. They could have brought an alternative way of dispersing rioting crowds.

But, the Independent Inquiry's members added, Wolde-Michael's trip to Europe and reporting of information out of context was "dishonest" politics as well as insensitive to the process of developing Ethiopia's young democracy. The Commission said Ethiopians need to solve their problems themselves so that this kind of violence wouldn't recur. It encouraged Ethiopians who respect authority to work together, and directed the government to "think seriously" about changing the mentality of the police.

=== Reactions ===
Despite the post-election complications, the Carter Center, US Government and British MPs continued to praise the democratic process in Ethiopia, but have each demanded the release of CUD leaders. After meeting with some opposition parties, the British MPs stated that the Ethiopian government should stand firmly against those who try to use "undemocratic and unconstitutional means" to change government. The other top opposition parties, the United Ethiopian Democratic Forces (UEDF) and the United Ethiopian Democratic Party-Medhin Party (UEPD-Medhin), are working with the government for negotiations on the democratic process. Opposition parties are still represented in the Ethiopian Parliament, where representatives from Oromia State hold most positions, and representatives from Amhara State hold the second most positions, in correlation with the comparative population of the corresponding states. Various opposition parties including the UEDF, UEPD-Medhin, Somali People's Democratic Party, EDL, Gambela People's Democratic Movement, All Ethiopian Unity Party, Oromo Federalist Democratic Movement and the Benishangul-Gumuz People's Democratic Unity Front hold positions in the parliament.

=== Prisoners ===
Until June 2007, many of the main opposition party's (CUD) leaders were detained for an alleged attempt to overthrow the government and initiating the post election violence. All of these charges are denied by CUD leadership both in Ethiopia and internationally, and the European Union advocated for the political prisoners to be released after a speedy trial. Some of these elected CUD officials endured very harsh conditions inside Ethiopia's poorly maintained prisons and they are at risk of various medical complications. As a result of the violence after the elections, many thousands were arrested and imprisoned. Even though the vast majority have been freed, some still remain in prison. Up to the end of 2005, around 8,000 Ethiopian rioters were freed.

== See also ==
- Amhara genocide
- Gimbi massacre
- Metekel conflict
- Mai Kadra massacre
