= Andargachew Tsege =

Ethiopian politician and writer (born 1955)

Andargachew Tsege አንዳርጋቸው ጽጌ
- Born: 9 February 1955 (age 71); Addis Ababa, Ethiopian Empire
- Education: University of Greenwich; Addis Ababa University
- Occupation: Politician
- Political party: Ginbot 7 (2008–2019); CUD (2005–2007); EPRP (1974–1979)
- Spouse: Yemsrach Hailemariam

Andargachew Tsege (Ge'ez: አንዳርጋቸው ጽጌ; born 9 February 1955), also known as Andy Tsige or Andy Tsege, is an Ethiopian politician. He is the chief executive officer of ESAT, a nonprofit independent media outlet in Ethiopia. He previously served as the secretary-general of Ginbot 7, a political party that was labeled as a terrorist group by the Ethiopian government until 2018. On 23 June 2014, he was abducted by Ethiopian security forces while in transit in Yemen's Sanaa International Airport and held at an unknown location in Ethiopia. On 29 May 2018, he was freed by the Ethiopian government following political reform by Prime Minister Abiy Ahmed.

== Early life ==
Andargachew was born in Addis Ababa, Ethiopia. He attended Teferi Mekonnen School and later as a Mechanical Engineering student at Addis Ababa University. While attending Addis Ababa University Tsege became very active in the student movement. Following the Ethiopian revolution of 1974 when a military dictatorship, Derg, seized power he drop out of Addis Ababa University joined the Ethiopian People's Revolutionary Party (EPRP) and went underground, like most of the Ethiopian youth, in their struggle against the Marxist regime.

During the Derg's Red Terror campaign of 1974, his younger brother Ameha Tsege was murdered by the security forces and Andargachew fled Ethiopia. Later, due to an ideological difference in the EPRP party, Tsege crossed into Sudan. In 1979 he was granted asylum in the United Kingdom (UK), where he later gained citizenship. In the UK he studied Philosophy at University of Greenwich in the early 1980s and wrote his dissertation on the German philosopher Immanuel Kant.

== Return to Ethiopia ==
When Derg was overthrown in 1991, Tsege went back to Ethiopia to help the newly formed Ethiopian People's Revolutionary Democratic Front (EPRDF) government led by his former university friend Meles Zenawi. Within two years, he was disillusioned with the ethnicity-oriented politics advocated by EPRDF and left the government. He moved back to London and started writing articles that were critical of the regime and its divisive politics.

== The 2005 general election ==
In 2005, Tsige returned to Ethiopia and published a book in Amharic which loosely translates to "Freedom fighter who does not know freedom", an analysis of the state of Ethiopian politics at the time. Soon, with an invitation from then deputy leader of Coalition for Unity and Democracy (CUD) party Berhanu Nega, he joined the party and helped the party in the ill-fated election of May 2005.

In June 2005, Tsige was imprisoned during the crackdown by the Ethiopian government after the election. After his release, he returned to London, where he was able to campaign against the regime by testifying at different government or international organisations including the US congress and European Commission of Human Rights as well as think tanks such as Chatham House. He became the principal spokesperson for the CUD party in exile and was instrumental in mobilizing the global Ethiopian diaspora for a worldwide campaign to secure the release of the CUD leaders and all prisoners of conscience.

== Post 2005 general election ==
In May 2008, he founded Ginbot 7 Movement for Justice, Freedom and Democracy with Berhanu Nega, one of the exiled leaders of CUD. He was elected as Secretary General of Ginbot 7.

On 22 December 2009, an Ethiopian court sentenced Tsige to death, in absentia, while 33 others were sentenced to life in prison along with four others who were also sentenced in absentia.

On 7 November 2013, Ginbot 7 claimed it foiled an assassination plot that targeted Tsige, secretary of Ginbot 7, as well as commanders and high-ranking officers of Ginbot 7 Popular Force.

On 23 June 2014, he was once again imprisoned by the Ethiopian regime. He was arrested by Yemeni security forces, in collaboration with Ethiopian intelligence service members, at Yemen's Sanaa International Airport while in transit from the United Arab Emirates to Eritrea. He was detained in an unknown location and no official statement was forthcoming from either the Yemeni or Ethiopian governments.

In February 2015, an early day motion was tabled within the UK parliament, recognising Tsige's 60th birthday, and calling for pressure to be applied to the Ethiopian government, in order to secure his release. In October 2016 Tsige's family wrote to ex British Prime Minister Tony Blair to use his "advisory role with the Ethiopian government" to call for Tsige's release. Blair's Tony Blair Africa Governance Initiative had an embedded team of advisors in Ethiopia.

In October 2017, it was reported that both the president of the Law Society and the chair of the Bar Council had urged the UK's Foreign Secretary to work to secure Tsege's release.

== 2018 reform and release from prison ==
Following the ascent of Abiy Ahmed to the premiership which results an opening of the political scene, on 29 May 2018, Andargachew was released from prison, resulting in celebrations in the city of Addis Ababa. In May 2019 Andargachew announce his retirement from party politics following the merge of Ginbot 7 in the new party Ethiopian Citizens for Social Justice but he continues as an advisor for Ethiopian Citizens for Social Justice party. Later in July 2019 Andargachew published his second book "Tiwlid AyeDenager Egnam EniNager" Volume 1.

In January 2020 it was announced that Andargachew becomes the CEO of one of the prominent private television in Ethiopia ESAT. Later in November 2020 he published his third book "Yetafaghu mastawesha" which is a story that narrators his abduction from Yemen airport to his experience as prominent political prisoner for four years in unknown location in Addis Ababa.

== Tigray War ==
In late November 2021, Andargachew made statements that researcher Mehari Taddele Maru interpreted as incitement to genocide. Addressing a crowd that included soldiers, Andargachew said that soldiers should use "the most savage of cruelties," stating: "I tell you, you must not hesitate from resorting to the most barbaric of cruelties when you face [Tigrayan armed forces]. You must be merciless, you must act beyond what our [ethnic] Amhara or Ethiopian cultural values permit." Andargachew later disputed this interpretation, arguing that his speech was a call for resistance against an invading force rather than an incitement to genocide.

== Personal life ==
Andargachew is married to Yemserach Hailemariam (Yemi). They have three children together (Hilawit, Menabe and Yilak). His family live in London. In 2015 Hilawit was awarded the Christine Jackson Young Person Award by the charity Liberty in recognition of her ongoing battle for the release of her father. Andargachew is a fan of Arsenal FC.
