= Ethiopian Citizens for Social Justice =

Political party in Ethiopia

Ethiopian Citizens for Social Justice የኢትዮጵያ ዜጎች ለማህበራዊ ፍትህ
- Abbreviation: ECFSJ ኢዜማ; EZEMA
- Leader: Eyob Mesafint
- Deputy Leader: Nigatu Welde
- Founded: May 2019
- Merger of: Patriotic Ginbot 7 EDP; AEDP; Semayawi Party; NGP; GRM; UDJ
- Headquarters: Addis Ababa
- Ideology: Economic liberalism; Political unitarism
- Political position: Centre
- Colours: Blue
- Seats in the House of Peoples' Representatives: 13 / 547

Website
- ethzema.org

Ethiopian Citizens for Social Justice (Amharic: የኢትዮጵያ ዜጎች ለማኅበራዊ ፍትህ, romanized: ye-Ïtiyop'iya zēgochi le-mahiberawī fitih; abbreviated ኢዜማ, EZEMA) is a liberal political party in Ethiopia. It was formed in May 2019 from the merger of the Patriotic Ginbot 7, Ethiopian Democratic Party (EDP), All-Ethiopian Democratic Party (AEDP), Semayawi Party, New Generation Party (NGP), Gambella Regional Movement (GRM), and Unity for Democracy and Justice (UDJ) party. In July 2019, ye-Ethiopia Ra'iy Party (ERaPa) also merged into EZeMa. The party's logo consists of scales of justice with a large pencil acting as a pole connecting the scales.

Its leader is Eyob Mesafint after the cofounder Berhanu Nega stepped away in March 2026, and its deputy leader is Nigatu Welde. Yeshiwas Assefa and Chane Kebede are chairperson and deputy chairperson, respectively.

The party’s leader currently serves as the Minister of Education of Ethiopia. Several other members of the party have also assumed leadership and administrative positions at the regional level. EZEMA is the largest opposition political party in Ethiopia, with branch offices established across all regions of the country. The party deliberately avoids rigid ideological alignment, instead embracing social justice as its core philosophical foundation and guiding principle, while grounding its political agenda in citizenship-based politics and democratic federalism as its central pillars.

== Election results ==
=== House of Peoples' Representatives elections ===
Election	Leader	Votes	%	Seats	+/–	Rank	Government
2021	Berhanu Nega	1,007,136	2.99%	4 / 473	▲4	▲2nd	Opposition
2026	Eyob Mesafint	N/A	N/A	13 / 486	▲9	2nd	Opposition
