= Inter Africa Group =

Ethiopian non-profit organisation

- Abbreviation: IAG
- Formation: 1989; 37 years ago
- Founder: Abdul Mohammed, Jalal Abdel-Latif
- Founded at: Addis Ababa, Ethiopia
- Type: Non-profit organisation
- Headquarters: Addis Ababa, Ethiopia
- Region served: Horn of Africa

The Inter Africa Group (IAG) is an Ethiopian independent non-profit organisation established in 1989 that works on sustainable development, democratic institutions, and peace and security in the Horn of Africa. The organisation's mandate covers Djibouti, Eritrea, Ethiopia, Kenya, Somalia, Sudan, and Uganda.

== History and founding ==
The Inter Africa Group was founded in 1989 by Abdul Mohammed and Jalal Abdel-Latif. The organisation was established to provide a centre for dialogue on humanitarian, peace, and development issues in the Horn of Africa region. IAG's mission is to advance humanitarian principles, peace and development through programmes combining research, dialogue, public education and advocacy.

During the June 1992 regional elections, the organisation conducted an independent evaluation of the electoral process and hosted post-election debriefing sessions. The organisation also participated in monitoring those elections alongside other civic organisations.

In subsequent elections, IAG organised political debate forums. During the 2000 and 2005 Ethiopian general elections, the group facilitated debate forums among political parties. In 2008, IAG received permission from the National Electoral Board of Ethiopia to organise debates in 12 towns including Addis Ababa, Bahirdar, Harrar, and Awassa, with 19 registered political parties participating.

== Research and publications ==
IAG came to prominence through its work on humanitarian policy and famine in Ethiopia. In 1994, the organisation convened a symposium marking the tenth anniversary of the 1984–1985 Ethiopian famine, the proceedings of which have been cited in academic scholarship on the politics of humanitarian relief in the country.

The organisation has published research on regional peace and security issues, including the monograph; The African Union and peace and security (2002), which is held in the African Union Commission Library.

In May 1993, IAG organised a constitutional symposium in Addis Ababa titled "The Symposium on the Making of the New Ethiopian Constitution," which was funded by USAID and other international donors including SIDA, CIDA, the Ford Foundation, and Oxfam.
