= Sophia Yilma =

Ethiopian journalist and politician

- ሶፍያ ይልማ

Vice-President of the Ethiopian Democratic Party
- Incumbent
- Assumed office 5 June 2005
- Preceded by: Hailu Araya

Personal details
- Born: Sophia Yilma Deressa; October 2, 1942 (age 84) Addis Ababa, Ethiopian Empire
- Party: Ethiopian Democratic Party
- Spouse: Tegegne Yeteshawork (w. 1974)
- Children: Yared Tegegne
- Education: Addis Ababa University; Free University of Berlin

Sophia Yilma (Amharic: ሶፍያ ይልማ, born May 20, 1942) is an Ethiopian journalist and politician. As the first female reporter for the Ethiopian Herald, Sophia was a pioneer in Ethiopian journalism, and rose to occupy important positions in both the Herald and the government. Later, following the Ethiopian Revolution and Civil War, she became a senior leader of the Ethiopian Democratic Party, and is currently its Vice-President.

== Early and personal life ==
Sophia was born in 1942, in Addis Ababa, the daughter of Elsabeth Workeneh and Yilma Deressa, a member of the Oromo nobility of Welega province. Her father would eventually become one of the leading figures of the Ethiopian government, serving as Finance Minister (1957–1970) and Minister of Foreign Affairs (1958), Ambassador to the United States, and a member of the Ethiopian Senate.

Growing up in the United States, to whom her father was ambassador, she attended the Georgetown Day School and the Baldwin School. She returned to Ethiopia to attend Haile Selassie I University, but dropped out to work for Ethiopian Radio, where she was inspired by other women such as broadcaster Romanework Kassahun. She then joined the Ethiopian Herald in 1961, where, at 19, she became both the newspaper's youngest and first female reporter. In 1962 she was appointed as editor of the Women's Page, making her a recognisable figure. She studied journalism for two years at the Free University of Berlin on a scholarship. Afterwards, she married the editor of the Herald, Tegegne Yeteshawork, having a son, Yared Tegegne. She became Public Relations Officer at the Ethiopian Telecommunications Office, producing their in-house magazine and leading both internal and external public relations.

== Revolution, imprisonment, and career ==
Following the 1974 coup d'état that overthrew Emperor Haile Selassie I and his government, both her father and husband were arrested by the Derg. Her husband was executed along with sixty other imperial officials on November 23, 1974, while her father died of cancer whilst in prison in 1979.

Sophia herself was arrested in 1976 and, with her mother, held in detention for seven months at the Kerchele Prison (commonly called Alem Bekagn - "Farewell to the World"), the same prison at which her husband had been executed. Having to support her family, she returned to Ethiopian Telecommunications, working in its public relations and customer service departments, where despite the company's small size it was considered a model even for companies in Europe. She retired in 1997.

Following this, she worked for eight years as Public Relations Officer for the Integrated Holistic Approach Urban Development Project founded by Jember Tefere.

== Politics and opposition ==
In 2005 she founded the short-lived Ethiopian Democratic Action Group (EDAG), a liberal democratic party. She was approached by Lidetu Ayalew to join the Ethiopian Democratic Unity Party, where she became the party's Vice-President. The party was part of the Coalition for Unity and Democracy opposition front, but was one of the few to take their seats in parliament, splitting with the remainder of the coalition.

She ran again for parliament in the 2010 elections, but was defeated in the landslide where the ruling Ethiopian People's Revolutionary Democratic Front took 545 out of 547 seats, and the EDUP none. Despite this setback, she worked to rebuild the party, re-branded as the Ethiopian Democratic Party, and has taken an increasingly vocal role in the Ethiopian opposition. She remained Vice President, securing membership in the Africa Liberal Network.
