= Ayalew =

Ayalew is a personal name, following the Habesha name system, of Ethiopian origin. Notable people with the name include:

- Ayalew Birru (1892–1945), Ethiopian military officer
- Aweke Ayalew (born 1993), Bahraini middle-distance and long-distance runner
- Hiwot Ayalew (born 1990), Ethiopian long-distance runner
- Lidetu Ayalew (born 1969), Ethiopian politician
- Wude Ayalew (born 1987), Ethiopian long-distance runner
