= Sheko and Mezenger People's Democratic Unity Organization =

Political party in Ethiopia

- Founded: c. 2000
- House of Peoples' Representatives (2005): 1 / 547

The Sheko and Mezenger People's Democratic Unity Organization (Amharic: የሸኮና መዠንገር ህዝቦች ዴሞክራሲያዊ ግንባር, SMPDUO) is a political party in Ethiopia. At the last legislative elections, 15 May 2005, the party elected Kassahun Jarka Ziyatu to represent a district in the Bench Maji Zone of the Southern Nations, Nationalities, and Peoples Region (SNNPR).

== History ==
The SMPDUO was founded in 2000 at the encouragement of the ruling Ethiopian People's Revolutionary Democratic Front (EPRDF), who had hoped to contain within the legal political framework local desire to combine three woredas -- Godere in the Gambela Region, and the Sheko and Yeki woredas from the SNNPR—into a new ethnic zone. However, this organization quickly gained a reputation for incendiary racialized rhetoric that dissuaded either the EPRDF or the opposition Southern Ethiopia People's Democratic Coalition from working with it.

In the elections held at the end of 2001, the SMPDUO won control of a majority of kebeles in Sheko and claimed control of Yeki woreda. One of the party's first acts when it gained power was to disarm kebele militias in the areas where the National Election Board of Ethiopia claimed the SMPDUO had not won the elections, but met with resistance. After months of frustration, individuals associated with the SMPDUO marched on Tepi, leading to ethnic violence there.

In the August 2005, Regional assembly elections, the SMPDUO won only one of the 348 seats in the SNNPR legislature. In the 2008 by-elections, the SMPDUO won 7 seats in one kebele in Yeki, gaining control of that local governmental unit.
