= Melatework Hailu =

Ethiopian politician and journalist

- ሜላተ ወርቅ ሀይሉ

Chairperson of the National Election Board of Ethiopia
- Incumbent
- Assumed office 19 December 2023
- Prime Minister: Abiy Ahmed
- Deputy: Wubshet Ayele
- Preceded by: Birtukan Mideksa

Melatework Hailu (Amharic: ሜላተ ወርቅ ሀይሉ) is an Ethiopian politician and journalist. She is the current chairperson of the National Election Board of Ethiopia (NEBE) since 2023.

== Career ==
Following Birtukan Mideksa resignation from National Election Board of Ethiopia (NEBE) chairperson on 26 June 2023, NEBE conducted a bid election for next presiding position on 2 December. Among the two bids, both Melatwork and Tadesse Lemma meet the criteria of the chair of NEBE. On 19 December, she was appointed by the House of Peoples' Representatives (HoPR) and nominated by Prime Minister Abiy Ahmed.
