= Eyob Mesafint =

Ethiopian lawyer and politician

Leader of Ethiopian Citizens for Social Justice
- Incumbent
- Assumed office 8 March 2026
- Preceded by: Berhanu Nega

Personal details
- Occupation: Lawyer, politician

Eyob Mesafint (Amharic: ኢዮብ መሳፍንት) is an Ethiopian lawyer and politician who is the leader of Ethiopian Citizens for Social Justice (EZEMA), the liberal opposition party, as of 2026.He is also a member of parliament after winning a constituency in Addis Ababa in 2026 Ethiopian general election.

== Career ==
Eyob Mesafint was a lawyer before becoming the CEO and Executive Committee member of Ethiopian Citizens for Social Justice (EZEMA). During this time, he led the party's policy alternatives, constitutional revision, institutional reform and promoting youth participation. On 8 March 2026, Eyob was elected as the leader of the EZEMA, succeeding Professor Berhanu Nega.
