= Samia Zekaria =

Ethiopian politician

Ambassador of Ethiopia to Qatar
- Incumbent
- Assumed office 2018

Personal details
- Born: 1955 (age 70–71) Harar, Ethiopian Empire
- Education: Haramaya University, Texas Tech University

Samia Zekaria Gutu is an Ethiopian diplomat. She serves as the Director General of the Central Statistical Agency of Ethiopia and was chairwoman of the National Election Board of Ethiopia until 2018.

== Early life ==
Samia was born in the city of Harar and raised in Dire Dawa. She credits her mother who was president of the Harari community association (Afocha) for instilling leadership skills in her at a young age. Samia has a BA in agricultural economics at Haramaya University and an MA in econometrics/economic statistics at Texas Tech University.

== Career ==
Samia was chairwoman of the National Election Board of Ethiopia until she was replaced by Birtukan Mideksa in 2018. She was also previously the Ethiopian ambassador to Nigeria and is currently the Ethiopian ambassador to Qatar.
