= Ethiopian Democratic League =

Political party in Ethiopia

The Ethiopian Democratic League is a political party in Ethiopia. In the 2005 general election, the party was part of the Coalition for Unity and Democracy, which won 109 out of 527 seats in the House of Peoples' Representatives. Its leader is Chekol Getahun.
