= Yacob Haile-Mariam =

Ethiopian politician and former Senior Prosecutor for the ICTR

Dr. Yacob Hailemariam (born 1944) is a retired professor of business law at Norfolk State University, former Senior Prosecutor for the International Criminal Tribunal for Rwanda, and an elected member of the Ethiopian parliament who had been held as a "prisoner of conscience" in Ethiopia.

When the May 2005 Ethiopian election was promoted as the first democratic election in the country's history, Haile-Mariam, affectionately called "Dr. Yacob" by his former students, took an early retirement from NSU to run for a parliamentary seat in his home district. Haile-Mariam became a member of the Coalition for Unity and Democracy (CUD), the main opposition party in Ethiopia, which gained strong and widespread support from the public. Despite the threats to his life and various forms of harassment, Haile-Mariam won his race by a landslide against the incumbent member of the ruling party. On October 31, 2005, the government arrested Haile-Mariam and other CUD party leaders, following electoral disputes, all of whom faced possible execution. In an effort to raise awareness and promote government action and about the former professor, various NSU student organizations hosted a candlelight vigil at Norfolk State University on Tuesday, April 18, 2006.

While an Ethiopian federal court declared him guilty with 37 other CUD members 11 June 2007, and subsequently sentenced him to life imprisonment, Dr. Yacob Haile-Mariam was released in September 2007, along with his fellow CUD members, after accepting a pardon from the federal government.
