= Anti-Tigrayan sentiment =

Ethnic hatred against Tigrayans in Ethiopia

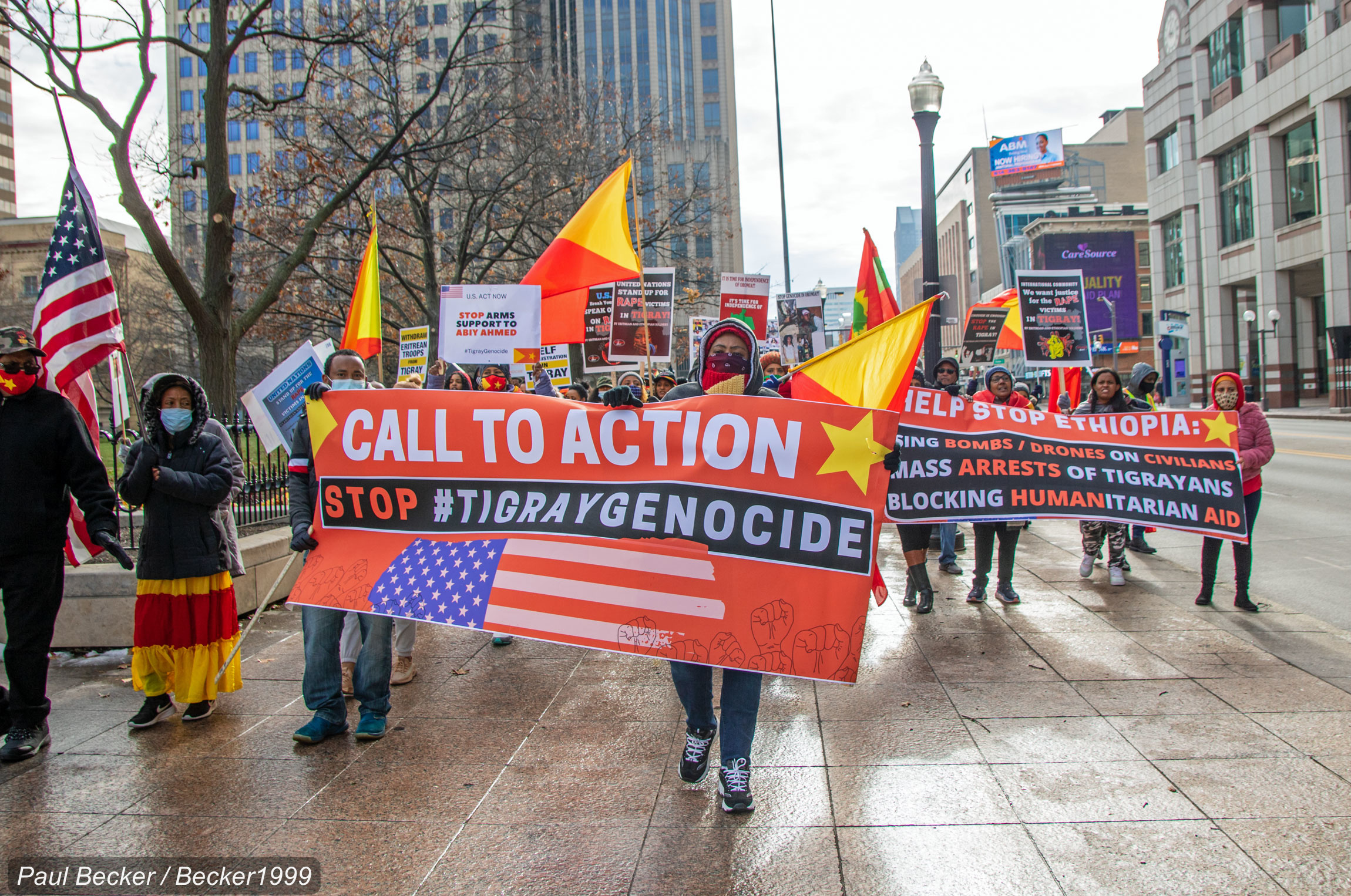
Demonstrators of Tigrayan origin during the Tigray War in Columbus, Ohio

Anti-Tigrayan sentiment is a broad opposition, discrimination, hatred and bias against Tigrayans that reside in northern Ethiopia. During the EPRDF era, anti-Tigrayan views have been common among Ethiopians, particularly after the 2005 general election. Not only the irregularities of election caused the sentiment, but also the EPRDF (dominated by majority Tigrayans) was becoming more authoritarian dictatorship. It also created discontent among Amharas and Oromos; the Oromos demanded justice after an abrupt master plan to expand boundaries of Addis Ababa into Oromia Region, resulted in mass protests.

== During the Tigray War ==
The Tigray War has manifested negative attitude against the Tigrayans. The Ethiopian federal government promoted hate speech statements against the ethnic group, as well as dehumanizing them in rare occasions. They have been subjected to massacres by the federal troops, Amhara regular and irregular forces, and Eritrean soldiers. Around 500,000 Tigrayans died as a result war crimes, famines and shortage of healthcare supplies.

From July 2021, the Ethiopian Federal Police began arresting thousands of Tigrayans in Addis Ababa. The Police claims that they have been arrested because they are supporting the Tigray People's Liberation Front (TPLF). Amnesty International said that they were detained because of ethnicity. The United Nations estimated that more than 15,000 Tigrayans civilian were arrested between November and February alone amidst the state of emergency. About 9,000 were still in detention as opposed to the government assertion that they have now released. Human Rights Watch stated that the government used arbitrary arrests, mistreatment, and force disappearance against Tigrayans where thousands are deported from Saudi Arabia instead receiving assistance from United Nations High Commissioner for Refugees (UNHCR).

=== Eritrean Army involvement ===
Eritrean involvement in the Tigray War has increasingly committed war crimes against Tigrayans after sending its thousands of soldiers in support of Ethiopian federal forces. According to rights groups, aid workers and news outlets, the Eritrean troops massacred hundreds of civilians, looted businesses and arbitrarily detained civilians already facing extraordinary suffering.
