= Ethiopian Democratic Party =

Ethiopian Democratic Party Amharic: የኢትዮጵያውያን ዴሞክራሲያዊ ፓርቲ (Ke-Ītyop’iyāwiyān Dēmokirasīyāwī Pārtī)
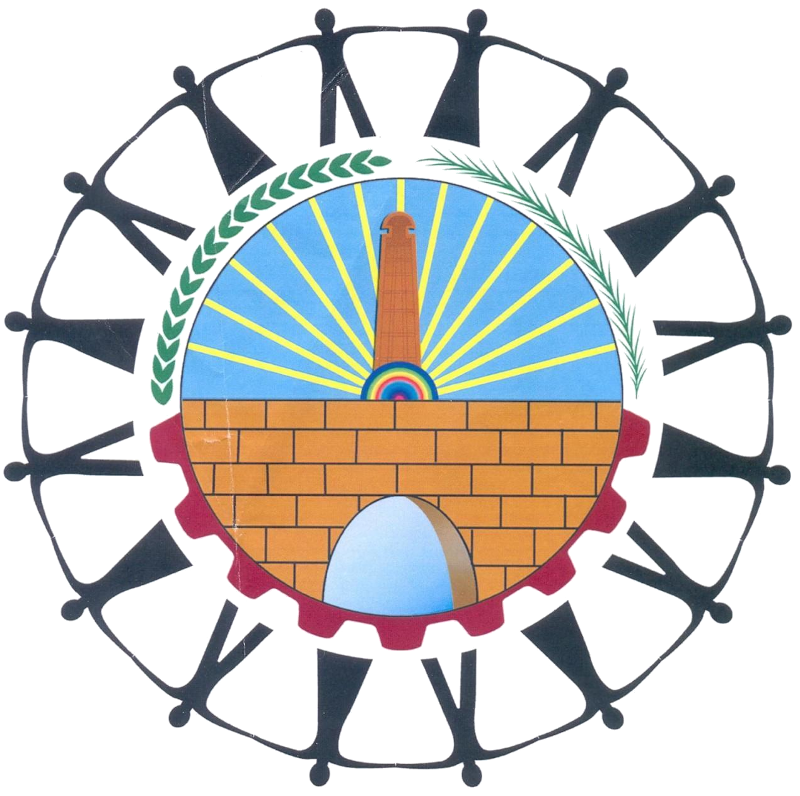
- President: Adane Tadesse
- Secretary-General: Sahlu Baye
- Founded: 1974 (EDU); 1999 (EDP)
- Dissolved: January 2021
- Merged into: Hibir Ethiopia Democratic Party
- Headquarters: Addis Ababa
- Ideology: National liberalism Economic liberalism Ethiopian nationalism
- Political position: Centre
- Regional affiliation: Africa Liberal Network
- International affiliation: Liberal International

Website
- edponline.org

The Ethiopian Democratic Party (Amharic: ከኢትዮጵያዊያን ዴሞክራሲያዊ ፓርቲ) (Ke-Ītyop’iyāwiyān Dēmokirasīyāwī Pārtī) is a political party in Ethiopia. The result of no less than five mergers of liberal and conservative liberal opposition parties, it could trace its roots to the Ethiopian Democratic Union, which mounted armed monarchist resistance to the Derg in the immediate aftermath of the overthrow of Haile Selassie I. In the legislative elections held on 15 May 2005, the United Ethiopian Democratic Party – Medhin, as it was then known, was part of the United Ethiopian Democratic Forces, that won 52 out of 527 seats in the Council of People's Representatives. It won no seats in the 2010 elections.

== Founding, mergers, and consolidation ==
In October 1999, the Ethiopian Democratic Party (EDP) was registered following "40 weeks of political discussion". In mid-2000, the party held its first congress, electing Admassu Gebeyehu, Hailu Araya and Lidetu Ayalew as Chairman, Vice Chairman, and General Secretary, respectively.

In September 2003, the EDP merged with the Ethiopian Democratic Union, becoming the United Ethiopian Democratic Party. Mengesha Seyoum became the party's honorary chairman, but played little role in the party administration, living in exile, and the post was quietly abolished.

In September 2004, it merged with the Ethiopian Medhin (Salvation) Democratic Party founded by former Foreign Minister Goshu Wolde and became the United Ethiopian Democratic Party – Medhin. In early 2005, it absorbed the short-lived Ethiopian Democratic Action Group of Sophia Yilma, daughter of former Minister of Finance Yilma Deressa. In August 2005, Lidetu Ayalew was elected Party President, Sophia Yilma Vice President, and Mushe Semu Secretary General.

=== Merger history ===
The following is an illustration of the party's mergers and name changes.

- Ethiopian Democratic Party (EDP) (renamed 2007)
  - UEDP – Medhin (merged 2004)
    - United Ethiopian Democratic Party (UEDP) (merged 2003)
      - Ethiopian Democratic Union (EDU)
        (1974–2003)
      - Ethiopian Democratic Party (EDP)
        (1999–2003)
    - Ethiopian Medhin Democratic Party (EMDP)
      (1993–2004)
  - Ethiopian Democratic Action Group (EDAG)
    (2005)

== Electoral performance ==
It agreed to contest the 2005 parliamentary elections as part of the Coalition for Unity and Democracy (CUD), winning 52 seats. It was one of the few to take their seats in parliament, splitting with the remainder of the coalition.

There were soon inner power struggles within the CUD, however. Former Chairman Hailu Araya had backed the leadership of Berhanu Nega, but was defeated in the Party Congress in August. Lidetu and Mushe were suspended from the CUD Central Council in October, and the party central committee voted to leave the coalition.

Lidetu was a victim of character assassination and defamation following the 2005 elections by the former CUD leaders. However, the election campaign in 2010 revealed that Lidetu and his party were not behind the unsuccessful unity. Despite this vindication, the party did not win any seats in the election, with the opposition overall winning only one seat.

UEDP-Medhin at present uses its original name EDP – Ethiopian Democratic Party. In March 2011, Mushe Semu became party president, succeeding Lidetu.

== Political positions ==
The EDP is one of the few Ethiopian parties with non-leftist origins, and had ties with the pre-revolutionary establishment. Correspondingly, it takes strong exception to the "ethnic federalist" and "democratic developmentalist" ideology of the ruling EPRDF.

=== Approach to governance and politics ===
The EDP is strongly opposed to the policy of Ethnic federalism and the division of Ethiopia on ethnic lines, supporting the restoration of the traditional provinces of Ethiopia within a federalist structure. It also supports the establishment of an independent judiciary, the observance of rule of law and human rights, as well as the strengthening of the rights of the federal regions. It rejects ethnic politics and as well as the general left-wing discourse of Ethiopian government.

However, it is supportive of peaceful opposition and opposes armed struggle against the present government, condemning the endorsement of Berhanu Nega for the establishment of an armed resistance (later actualised as the "Ginbot 7 Popular Force") against the EPRDF government. It was this refusal to support armed struggle that was behind much of the allegations that the EDP was insufficiently opposed to or in collaboration with the EPRDF in the run-up to the 2010 elections.

=== Economic positions ===
Opposing the state interventionist policies of the government, the party contends that government policies have weakened the Ethiopian private sector and hampered prospects for long-term growth. It opposes continued state ownership of land and supports the reform to allow for private ownership of land, as well as increasing the property rights of smallholders. It is opposed to the price controls imposed to counter the high rate of inflation, saying that expansionary fiscal policies were to blame, and that punishing lending requirements on the private sector- private banks are required to set aside 27% of their lending for treasury bonds to fund large infrastructure projects- were hampering the economy, a position supported by the IMF, World Bank, and pro-business Ethiopian organisations like the Chamber of commerce and Capital Ethiopia.

== Party leaders ==
=== Ethiopian Democratic Union ===
- Leul Ras Mengesha Seyoum (1974–1978)

=== Ethiopian Democratic Party ===
- Ato Admassu Gebeyehu (2000–2005)
- Ato Lidetu Ayalew (2005–2011)
- Ato Mushe Semu (2011–2013)
- Dr. Chane Kebede (2013–2019)
- Ato Adane Tadesse (2019–present)
