= Ethiopian Democratic Union =

Former political party in Ethiopia (1975–1987)

The Ethiopian Democratic Union (Amharic: የኢትዮጵያ ዴሞክራሲያዊ ህብረት) or EDU, also known as Teranafit (formerly a separate group based in Shire before it merged with the EDU), was one of the political parties that formed in opposition to the Derg regime of Ethiopia. It merged with the Ethiopian Democratic Party to form the Ethiopian Democratic Unity Party.

== Armed struggle ==
Founded in the aftermath of the revolution and the military coup that toppled Emperor Haile Selassie in September 1974, the EDU professed a conservative agenda. Established under the tutelage of the hereditary Prince of Tigray, Ras Mengesha Seyoum, the EDU was made up of various elements that included land owners who were opposed to the nationalization of their land holdings, monarchists, high-ranking military officers displaced by the mutineers who had led the coup against the Emperor, and conservative and centrist opponents of the Marxist-Leninist Derg. From mid-1976 into 1977, the EDU broadcast radio programs into Ethiopia from the Sudan, and also launched a military campaign into Begemder that almost captured Gondar. Although democratic ideals were voiced by the party, and vaguely promoted a constitutional monarchy, it never made its political program clear, a failing which eventually weakened the EDU when its various factions began to diverge politically. Ethnic rivalries between the Tigrean loyalists of Ras Mangasha and the non-Tigrean elements of the EDU also widened the split.

Other rebel movements politically opposed to the EDU, which included the Tigrayan Peoples' Liberation Front in Tigray and the Ethiopian People's Revolutionary Party in Begemder, fought against them and helped the Derg forces push the EDU out of the territories it held. In 1978, the leadership of the EDU split due to serious political differences that had developed between them and it withdrew from the armed struggle against the Derg regime. It remained active among Ethiopian exile communities, particularly in Europe and in the Sudan.

The group was responsible for a pogrom against Ethiopian Jews in 1978.

== Opposition party ==
The EDU reorganized in Addis Ababa as a legal opposition party after the TPLF led the Ethiopian People's Revolutionary Democratic Front to power. It was at this time the party assumed a pan-Ethiopian liberal republican ideology. The party had a representative at the July 1991 London conference which led to the establishment of the Transitional Government of Ethiopia. However some small factions continued to resist the EPRDF, particularly in Begemder province.

== Merger ==
In September 2003, the EDU merged with the Ethiopian Democratic Party, becoming the United Ethiopian Democratic Party. Seyoum Mengesha became the party's honorary chairman, but played little role in the party administration, living in exile, and the post was quietly abolished.
