= Kemal Bedri =

Ethiopian judge

President of the Federal Supreme Court
- In office 1996–2009
- President: Negasso Gidada
- Prime Minister: Meles Zenawi
- Deputy: Membere Tsehay Tadesse

Chairperson of the National Election Board of Ethiopia
- In office 1991–1996

Personal details
- Born: Harar, Ethiopia
- Party: Harari National League
- Education: Addis Ababa University (LLB)
- Occupation: Judge

Kemal Bedri is an Ethiopian judge. He served as the founding chairman of the National Election Board of Ethiopia (NEBE) and later President of the Federal Supreme Court of Ethiopia until 2009.

== Early life ==
Kemal was born in the city of Harar. He received a Bachelor of Laws (LL.B.) from Addis Ababa University in 1973. During the Derg regime, he was appointed judge and was involved in various judiciary roles.

== Career ==
Following the collapse of the Derg in 1991, the new transitional government of Ethiopia nominated him as the chairman of the National Election Board of Ethiopia. In 1996 he would leave his position as head of NEBE to become President of the Federal Supreme Court of Ethiopia.

He was an adherent of the now defunct Harari National League.
