= Birtukan Mideksa =

Ethiopian politician and former judge

- ብርቱካን ሚደቅሳ
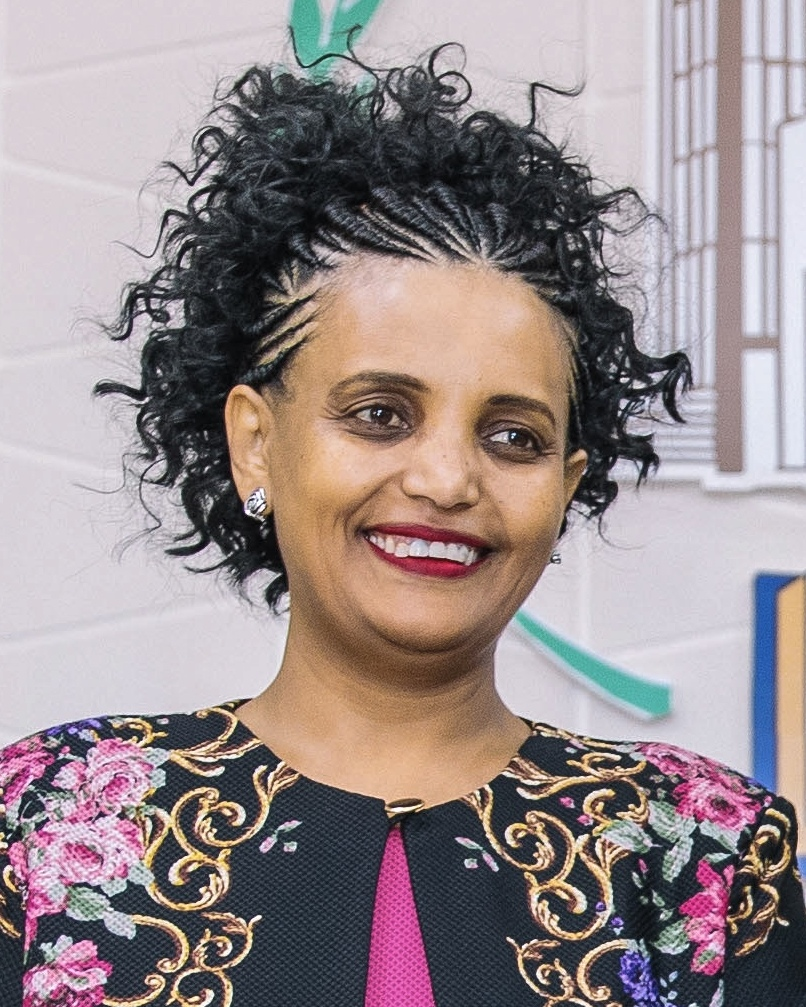
- Birtukan in 2018

Chairperson of the National Election Board of Ethiopia
- In office 23 November 2018 – 7 August 2023
- Deputy: Wubshet Ayele
- Preceded by: Samia Zekaria
- Succeeded by: Melatework Hailu

President of Unity for Democracy and Justice
- In office 2008–2010

First Vice-President of Coalition for Unity and Democracy
- In office 2005–2007

Judge at 3rd district of the Federal High Court of Ethiopia
- In office 1998–2003

Personal details
- Born: 27 April 1974 (age 52) (Note: With her daughter Haale Mideksa interview, she states "One day I said to my mother 'Happy Birthday' [DOB: 27 April 1974]. But when I ask her how many days are left before she is released, she does not give me an answer. She does not say she will be released or not released. I long for her so much!") Addis Ababa, Ethiopian Empire
- Party: Independent
- Other political affiliations: Unity for Democracy and Justice (2008–2010); Coalition for Unity and Democracy (2005–2007)
- Education: Addis Ababa University (LLB); Harvard University (MA)
- Occupation: Political activist Lawyer; Judge

Birtukan Mideksa (Amharic: ብርቱካን ሚደቅሳ; born 27 April 1974) is an Ethiopian politician and former judge who has served as chairwoman of the National Election Board of Ethiopia (NEBE) from 2018 to 2023. She was the founder and leader of the opposition Unity for Democracy and Justice (UDJ) party from 2008 to 2010.

On 26 June 2023, Birtukan announced that she would resign from her post as NEBE chairperson effective on 7 August.

== Early life and education ==
Birtukan Mideksa was born in Addis Ababa. She attended Miazia 23 missionary elementary school and later the Yekatit 12 secondary school also known as Etege Menen School. After graduating from high school, she attended Addis Ababa University where she graduated with a Bachelor of Laws (LL.B.). In 2014, Birtukan received Master of Arts (M.A.) in Public Administration from Harvard University. She is the mother of a daughter named Haale Mideksa who was born in 2005.

== Professional career ==
Birtukan started her career as an associate judge. Later she was appointed to be a judge at the 3rd district court of the federal first instant court. In July 2002, she presided over a high-profile case of a former top-ranking official of the Tigray People's Liberation Front (TPLF) and former Minister of Defense Siye Abraha, who was accused of corruption. She set the defendant free on bail, and was surprised minutes later when federal authorities arrested Siye while he was walking out of the court accompanied by his family and friends. Following the re-arrest of Siye, Birtukan received threats and intimidation from government security officials. She then resigned from the federal court and started an independent Law firm. She worked as a lawyer from late 2003 to 2005.

== Political career ==
Birtukan decided to join a political party to help bring about change, including recognition of the rule of law, and full respect for the implementation of the constitution. She joined the Rainbow Ethiopia: Movement for Democracy and Social Justice Party, and later Coalition for Unity and Democracy (CUD). In the election of 2005, her party won over a third of the seats. Party members believed they would have won even more seats if not for voting and counting irregularities. After the election, the governing party started to round up opposition party leaders including Birtukan, who was convicted of attempting to overthrow the constitutional order and was sentenced to life in prison. She was pardoned in 2007 after lengthy negotiations and after she, along with other leaders of the opposition, spent 18 months in prison.

Birtukan later founded the Unity for Democracy and Justice (UDJ) with the same principles that guided CUD. The need for having the new party name came from the fact that the ruling party's election commission was awarded to a splinter group from CUD (aka Kinijit). Birtukan was elected to be a chairwoman of the UDJ, which has the goal of bringing about change in Ethiopia by peaceful means.

On 28 December 2008, Birtukan was re-arrested. Her 2007 pardon was revoked and she was sentenced to life in prison. Human Rights Watch called the arrest politically motivated. The Ethiopian government claimed that her pardon had been conditional on "an apology for her crimes," and that it had ordered her re-arrest after hearing reports that she had publicly denied having apologized for her actions or asking for a pardon. Elizabeth Blunt of the BBC said that since her arrest, Birtukan, whom she described as "one of the younger and more charismatic leaders of the coalition which did so astonishingly well against the ruling party in the 2005 elections," had become "even more of a heroine, attracting widespread sympathy as a single mother separated from her baby daughter."

In December 2009, Amnesty International categorized Birtukan's imprisonment as "unjust and politically motivated" The organization also launched an international campaign demanding her release, challenging the Ethiopian government's claim that her incarceration was a legal matter.

== Post-imprisonment and exile ==
On 6 October 2010, Birtukan was released from prison. According to government spokesman Shimeles Kemal, Birtukan submitted a pardon plea in October 2010, while the justice ministry quoted a statement in which she expressed regret for denying her 2007 pardon. The United Kingdom's Minister for Africa, Henry Bellingham, welcomed her release, stating "This is an important step forward. We have always taken the view that her re-imprisonment was not in Ethiopian interest and a solution to Ethiopian political problem."

In 2011, Birtukan resigned from politics and went to the US, to study at Harvard. She was awarded the Reagan-Fascell Democracy Fellowship of the U.S. National Endowment for Democracy, giving her five months in Washington, D.C. to "study the principles of democracy." As of March 2013, Birtukan was a fellow at Harvard University's W.E.B. Du Bois Institute for African and African American Research.

Starting from mid-2014, she had been working as Researcher at National Endowment for Democracy until her return to Ethiopia in November 2018 following the 2016 Ethiopian protests which resulted in an end to the 27 years of the TPLF led EPRDF government.

== Return to Ethiopia ==
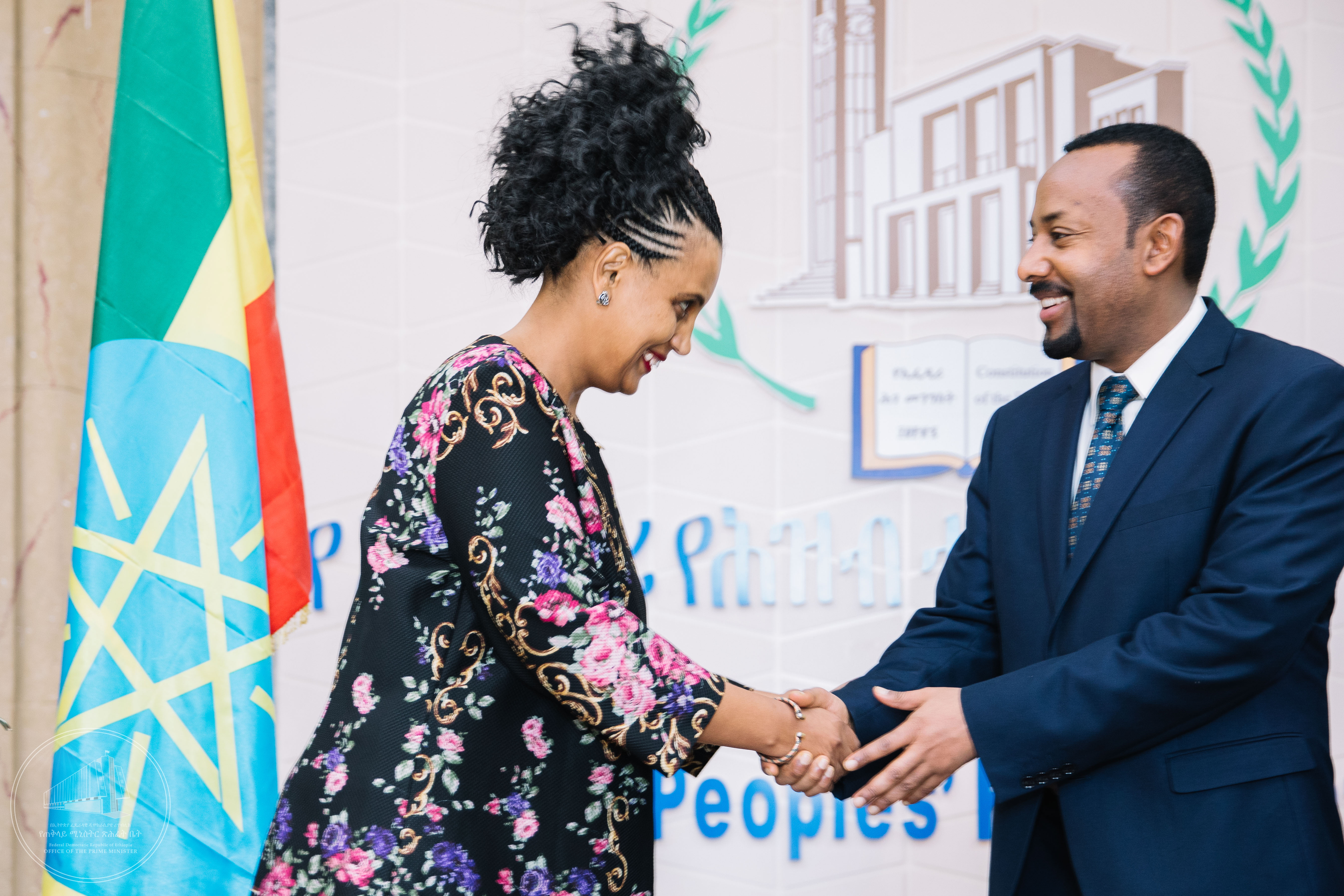
Birtukan appointed as chairwoman of the National Electoral Board of Ethiopia in November 2018

Encouraged by the political reforms started by Prime Minister Abiy Ahmed in April 2018, Birtukan returned to Ethiopia in November 2018. On 23 November 2018, she was elected and sworn in as chairwoman of the National Election Board of Ethiopia (NEBE) replacing incumbent Samia Zekaria. Birtukan announced her resignation from this position on 26 June 2023 through her Facebook page; she submitted her resignation to Speaker of the House of People's Representatives on 12 June and will continue to serve as NEBE chairperson until 7 August.
