= Rainbow Ethiopia: Movement for Democracy and Social Justice =

Political party in Ethiopia

- Founder: Mesfin Woldemariam
- Founded: 2000s
- House of Peoples' Representatives: 109 / 527 (2005)

The Rainbow Ethiopia: Movement for Democracy and Social Justice (RE:MDSJ), also known as Keste Damena Ethiopia, was a political party in Ethiopia. At the 2005 legislative elections, the party was part of the Coalition for Unity and Democracy in the Council of People's Representatives, which later became Unity for Democracy and Justice. In an electoral upset that year, the city council of Ethiopian capital Addis Ababa was taken by the opposition coalition, including Rainbow Ethiopia.

The founding chairman was Dr. Berhanu Nega. The public relations head of the party was Professor Mesfin Woldemariam.
