= ESAT =

U.S. based Ethiopian television network

- Country: Ethiopia
- Network: Television network
- Headquarters: Addis Ababa, Ethiopia; Washington D.C., United States

Programming
- Languages: Amharic; English; Oromo
- Picture format: 576i (HDTV), 16:9

Ownership
- Owner: The Ethiopian Satellite Television & Radio (ESAT)
- Key people: Andargachew Tsige (CEO)

History
- Launched: April 24, 2010; 16 years ago

Links
- Website: ethsat.com

Ethiopian Satellite Television (ESAT) is an Ethiopian satellite news network headquartered in Washington D.C., United States. It is a nonprofit and independent media outlet mostly privately funded by donors from the broader Ethiopian diaspora.

== History ==
ESAT was established on April 24, 2010 by a group of leading exiled journalists, most of whom were jailed, tortured or forced into exile, to provide accurate, objective and balanced news, analysis and information, perspective as well as entertainment, talk shows, documentaries, sports and cultural programming pertaining to Ethiopia and the rest of the world.

== Programming ==
Content is mostly focused on political news from Ethiopia, but also covers some international news. The majority of broadcasts are in Amharic (the federal language of Ethiopia) with some programs in Afaan Oromo and English. It has studios located in Washington D.C., Amsterdam and London (UK). In addition to a satellite and online TV service, ESAT also added a daily radio broadcast in September 2011.

== Political significance ==
ESAT from its inception was a source of contrary voices highly critical of the Ethiopian government. It was one of the pivotal media organizations reporting on anti-government protests that swept across Ethiopia starting in 2015 and lasting until 2018. There were one of many media organization banned and charged in absentia for inciting violence and promoting acts of terror by the Ethiopian government. The charges were dropped in late May or early June 2018. The station has long been linked with the Ginbot 7 political opposition group, something that has not been verified by ESAT itself. Prior to moving to the Ethio 360 Media, Habtamu Ayalew contributed to the network.

=== Hate speech ===
In 2017, according to a Horn Affairs report, an ESAT journalist, Mesay Mekonnen, stated in a 6 August 2016 public broadcast by ESAT that the Tigray People's Liberation Front (TPLF) domination of Ethiopia was that of "a small minority ethnic group, representing five percent of the Ethiopian population, who wants to rule Ethiopia subjugating others" and that "the solution for what we are facing at this time is 'drying the water so as to catch (kill) the fish.'" Horn Affairs interpreted the statement as a call for genocide of Tigrayans in order to destroy the TPLF.
