= Coalition for Unity and Democracy =

Former political coalition in Ethiopia

Coalition for Unity and Democracy ቅንጅት ለአንድነት እና ዴሞክራሲ
- President: Hailu Shawul
- Spokesperson: Lidetu Ayalew
- First Vice-President: Birtukan Mideksa
- Vice-president: Berhanu Nega
- Foreign Relations Head: Yacob Haile-Mariam
- Founded: 2004
- Dissolved: 2007
- Headquarters: Addis Ababa
- Youth wing: CUD Youth League
- Membership (2004): 4.6 million
- Ideology: Ethiopian nationalism Civic nationalism Liberalism; Federalism; Populism
- Political position: Centre-right
- National affiliation: UDJ; Ginbot 7 AEUP; SP

Website
- kinijitethiopia.org

The Coalition for Unity and Democracy (Ge'ez : ቅንጅት ለአንድነት እና ዴሞክራሲ), commonly referred to by its English abbreviation CUD, or occasionally CDU (its Amharic abbreviation, used in Ethiopia, is Qinijit; in English writing often referred to as Kinijit), was a coalition of four existing political parties of Ethiopia which combined to compete for seats in the Ethiopian General Elections held on May 15, 2005, and around the end of that year, became a full-fledged political party (the Coalition for Unity and Democracy Party). Its leader was Hailu Shawul and the political party was dissolved in 2007.

== 2005 Ethiopian elections ==
The four parties that combined to form the CUD are: Ethiopian Democratic League, All Ethiopian Unity Party (AEUP), United Ethiopian Democratic Party-Medhin Party and Rainbow Ethiopia: Movement for Democracy and Social Justice. At the legislative elections, 15 May 2005, the party won 89 out of 527 seats in the House of Peoples' Representatives, representing the Regions of Amhara, Oromia, and of the Southern Nations, Nationalities, and Peoples (SNNPR), as well as in the chartered cities of Dire Dawa and Addis Ababa.

Despite the CUD winning 99% of Addis Ababa, the ruling party continued to govern the city. The CUD and the EU election observers said there was heavy election rigging and the opposition might have won more seats.

Engr. Hailu was placed under house arrest in early June 2005 after a government investigation into his alleged involvement in the planning of riots, which the government claims over 40 were killed, but were referred to by the CUD as street protests, concluded he was responsible.

In the elections for the Regional assemblies, the CUD won 137 of the 138 seats in the Addis Ababa administrative district, 106 of 294 in the Amhara Region, 11 of 89 in the Benishangul-Gumuz Region, 1 of 82 in the Gambela Region, 3 of 36 in the Harari Region, 33 of 537 in Oromia, and 39 of 348 in the SNNPR. But the split inside CUD has caused big problems. One of the parties that split was the old UEDP-Medhin and this was a major problem for the AEUP because without UEDP-Medhin, CUD support in Addis Ababa would have been "no more than marginal."

After implying that the ruling Ethiopian People's Revolutionary Democratic Front (EPRDF) committed election fraud, on 6 November the CUD leadership called for a week of riots and a boycott of businesses owned by members of the EPRDF, as well as boycotting the new parliament. In response, the TPLF/EPRDF stripped CUD legislators of their parliamentary immunity, and arrested a large number of CUD members.

As of December 2025, most of the leaders of the AEUP subparty remain imprisoned, awaiting the outcome of their trial that has spanned nearly a year starting from their arrest. Porous roofs, cramped conditions, extreme temperatures have all contributed to the numerous emergency room visits that the main leaders of the party have experienced. During this time the health of three of the major figures—Hailu, Professor Mesfin Woldemariam, Berhanu Nega—has suffered during their incarceration, and required visits to the Police hospital. There is an international effort in motion that is trying to create harmony between EPRDF and CUD, but it has not made any progress.

The spirit of CUD and the Kinijit movement is still in motion. Berhanu Nega has written a book, published by MM publishing, providing his account not only of the CUD's role in the election, but also of his imprisonment, as well as of his fellow detainees.

== Criticisms ==
Engineer Hailu, a leader of the AEUP, was one of the ministers working for the previous Ethiopian Derg regime led by Mengistu Haile Mariam. Under the Derg government, it was one of the darkest eras for Ethiopia, which some sources claim up to 1,500,000 Ethiopians were victims of the genocide. Due to this, many people have been worried about his rise into the executive leadership of this opposition party. Engineer Hailu held an insignificant ministry, The Ministry of State Farms and his role was primarily technical management of farms. He was never a significant player in the regime and had little influence on issue that had to do beyond the State Farms.

Also various negotiations between the UEDP-medhin opposition party and the AEUP opposition party failed. And this was a major problem for the AEUP that was originally united with UEDP-Medhin to make up the CUD because without UEDP-Medhin, CUD support in Addis Ababa would have been "no more than marginal." Most people, including UEDP-Medhin and Rainbow party, have pointed out the hardliners inside AEUP, particularly Hailu Shawel, were the reasons for the disagreements. Some members said AEUP leaders like Hailu Shawel "are chauvinists and dictators who think that they are the only best opposition party."

The other issue was about accepting the parliamentary seats of the CUD party. When UEDP and others Disrespected the vote of the people and took their seats, some AEUP members, forced by Hailu, did not take their seats because they believed there was election fraud. Later, they organized a demonstration. Some said the hardliners in AEUP knew there would be massive riots beforehand. One SBS journalist, Olivia Rousset, indicated that the government used too much force to calm the rioters.

A major issue arose when even the closest people to Hailu rejected his stance and wanted to take their parliamentary seats instead of joining the banned protests that turned to riots. One of them, Berhanu Nega, stated that elected MPs and City Councilors would be betraying their constituents if they failed to take their seats. But at the end, the minority in AEUP, including Hailu Shawel, forced CUD members to change direction, thus causing a permanent division between UEDP and AEUP. Most sources claim that the Rainbow party also split from Hailu's AEUP but the decision of mayor choice issues between UEDP and Rainbow allowed Hailu to dictate Rainbow's destiny. Following the split in the party, most subparties in CUD itself are working in the parliament as are the other opposition parties, with the exception of Hailu's AEUP members who have been charged with inciting the riots that resulted in many deaths.

== Recent developments ==
The Walta Information Center reported 9 October that the CUD lost its legal life with the conclusion of the 2005 election, and is no longer accredited as a political party. Although a number of members of the Ethiopian Parliament still possess identification cards issued by the CUD, National Election Board of Ethiopia (NEBE) deputy head Tesfaye Mengesha stated that this does not guarantee eligibility. The CUD that existed in the pre-election had long taken its exit, he concluded. "Today's CUD has borne nothing of the former, but the name."

In a surprise development, the General Assembly of the CUD met on 22 October in the Hall of the NEBE in Addis Ababa, and elected new officials. Ayele Chamesso was elected party chairman and the former Chairman Temesgen Zewde was elected deputy chairman in absentia, while Sasahulh Kebede became Secretary General. However Temesgen Zewde stated that the meeting was held against party rules and its decisions were illegal. When asked why the NEBE allowed the assembly to take place on its premises, Mekonnen Wondimu, the Acting Registrar of the NEBE Political Parties Registration Office, replied that the request had been made in writing by the deputy chairman of the party, and that the NEBE has never turned down the requests of political parties when they made similar requests.

After a split between inside CUD in the diaspora, another split occurred to CUD in Ethiopia during the Ethiopian intervention in Somalia. A CUD group led by Temesgen Zewde disapproved the decision by the government to go into Somalia, while a CUD group led by Tadesse Bekele (CUD's elected representative for Addis Ababa City Council) supported the ruling party's decision to go into Somalia. Tadesse said "Ethiopians have never been divided on the issue of the sovereignty of the country, and the stand of the CUD group led by Temesgen and some opposition parties has failed to prioritize national interest."

After a long trial, the Ethiopian court found 38 CUD officials guilty of breaching Ethiopia's constitution. General charges ranged from armed rebellion to "outrage against the constitution". In addition to organizing and provoking the violence, witnessed also accused some CUD leaders of attempting assassinations on government heads. Various human rights organizations have accused the trial of being politically motivated.

== Freedom and revival ==
After spending 20 months in jail and being convicted by the court, Kinijit leaders, after undergoing through amnesty board, were finally released on July 20, 2007. According to the government and the mediator elders, the CUD prisoners signed an apology letter admitting partial responsibility for the post election violence and promising not to use unconstitutional means for any political aims. In addition to their release, the prisoners' right to vote and seek public office also have been restored. Following their release, the American government said "The United States appreciates the efforts of Ethiopian elders and civil society leaders that resulted in today’s pardon by the Ethiopian Government of 38 opposition leaders and journalists detained in the wake of political violence in 2005."

== Senior executives ==
Chairman: Eng. Hailu Shawel
1st Vice Chairperson: Birtukan Mideksa
Secretary: Muluneh Eyuel

Executive staff:
Abayneh Birhanu, Abdurahman Ahmedin, Akalu Gergrie, Hailu Alemayehu, Befikadu Degifie, Dereje Amensisa, Elala Tezera, Major Getachew Mengistu, Eng Gizachew Shiferaw, Leniesil Asfaw, Mulalem Tarekegn, Mesfin Ayalew, Seleshi Tena, Shimel Tekletsdik, and Yakob Hailemariam

In a past development Hailu Shawel was said to be sacked and replaced by first vice-chairperson, Birtukan Mideksa, who as of November 2009 has been in prison since December 2008 and is considered to be a political prisoner by Human Rights Watch.
