= Lidetu Ayalew =

Ethiopian politician and businessman (born 1969)

Lidetu Ayalew ልደቱ አያለዉ

Member of Parliament for Ethiopian Democratic Party
- In office 2005–2010

Personal details
- Born: 1970 (age 55–56) Lalibela, Begemder Province, Ethiopian Empire (now Amhara Region, Ethiopia)
- Party: Ethiopian Democratic Party
- Other political affiliations: Coalition for Unity and Democracy (2004-2006)
- Education: Degree in History, Masters Degree in Developmental Economics in Europe university
- Profession: Politician; Businessperson

Lidetu Ayalew (Ge'ez: ልደቱ አያለዉ; born 1969) is an Ethiopian politician who is the founder and the leader of the Ethiopian Democratic Party. He was a deputy chairman and chief spokesperson of Coalition for Unity and Democracy (CUD), during the 2005 Ethiopian general election.

== Early life ==
Lidetu was born in 1969 in the historical town of Lalibela, Ethiopia - also known as Bugna woreda. He came from a modest family background, started his career working in NGOs later owning a profitable auto import business. He enrolled in Addis Ababa University and earned B.A. in History. He also earned Master's degree in Development economics from SOAS University of London.

== Political career ==
Lidetu rose to political prominence by forming the Ethiopian Democratic Party (EDP) in 1992 with an initial membership of 120 men and women. He was the secretary General of the EDP until he led the forming of a new coalition called UEDP, which later join Medhin and became UEDP-Medhin. Over the years, he has been a thorn on the side of PM Meles Zenawi and the ruling EPRDF party by matching Meles' rhetoric word-to-word. He organized various demonstrations protesting some of the policies of the government, particularly alongside students. One of his achievements was his organizational role in founding the CUD (Kinijt) and bringing it to national political dominance. He was the vice chairman of this coalition party until internal issues caused the coalition to break up. The coalition Kinijit party won 109 of the 546 seats in the government, however when Mr. Ayalew's UEDP-Medhin party split from Kinijit, it took some of their seats as well. UEDP-Medhin had won the majority of seats in the Addis Ababa council at the 2005 elections.

His party is also known for starting a new movement called "the Third Way." While some Ethiopians including Berhanu Nega disapprove this concept, others state that it is a progressive and exemplary political concept.

After the elections, Lidetu authored a book called Yearem Ersha (Amharic, "The weed farm"). In his book, he detailed the foundation of his party, the issues resulting to the breakup of the Kinijit party and the general elections. He also discusses the big gap in the thinking between Ethiopian politicians from the 1970s and early 1980s as compared to politicians from 1990s and 21st century. He concluded that both the old politicians of the ruling party and various opposition parties have been clearly ineffective and inflexible. He stated that no matter how democratic they claimed to be in public, the older groups had the remnants of the old leftist Ethiopian movement as opposed to the 1990s democratic school of thought his party developed.

Lidetu played a leading role in bringing about the limited rights opposition parties enjoyed leading to the 2005 Ethiopian Election. In the days leading to this election, people from the Derg and EPRP era joined Lidetu's opposition struggle through the formation of CUD. After the relatively free votes in Ethiopia (especially in the capital Addis Ababa) election results started to show in favor of the opposition group CUD. The power-hungry Derg and EPRP era politicians couldn't resist the temptation to outmaneuver Lidetu to power. This resulted in a fallout between Lidetu and other opposition leaders such as Berhanu Nega. Lidetu's political reputation was seriously damaged due to his unorthodox alliance with senior members of the EPRDF which led many to conclude that he played a destructive role in the dissolution of the CUD and for the imprisonment of most of the coalition's senior officials due to their refusal to take up their parliamentary seats. After joining the Federal Parliament while his former-CUD colleagues were jailed for serious charges, Lidetu’s political image in Ethiopia suffered a further blow. His popularity plummeted significantly in the aftermath of the elections as he was considered to be a puppet of the ruling EPRDF, as a result of former-CUD leader's massive propaganda to defame him.

One of the most important issues Lidetu Ayalew's party has addressed since 2006 was inflation in the country. EDP stressed that people living in the urban centers are suffering from the rise of prices including food items, utilities, etc. Despite government intervention, Lidetu said it is not working so far and there should be a salary increase until a "sustainable solution".

After the 2010 Ethiopian General Election, Lidetu left the Federal parliament as he did not win a seat. In 2011, he left the presidency of EDP to Mushe Semu since his party's regulation does not allow one person to hold the presidency for more than two consecutive periods (eight years). EDP is the only Ethiopian political party with such relaxed regulation despite other party presidents who monopolize power for decades.

On 3 August 2018, Lidetu was promoted to the new Government Privatisation Advisory Council to advise Prime Minister Abiy Ahmed concerning his new economic reforms.
