= Mesfin Woldemariam =

Ethiopian academic and human rights activist (1930–2020)

- መስፍን ወልደ ማርያም
- Born: 23 April 1930; Addis Ababa, Ethiopian Empire
- Died: 29 September 2020 (aged 90); Addis Ababa, Ethiopia
- Resting place: Holy Trinity Cathedral, Addis Ababa, Ethiopia
- Education: Punjab University, Chandigarh; Clark University
- Occupations: Academician; human rights activist; political theorist
- Title: Professor of Geography and Philosophy; Founder of the Ethiopian Human Rights Council

Mesfin Woldemariam (Ge'ez: መስፍን ወልደ ማርያም; 23 April 1930 – 29 September 2020) was an Ethiopian academic and human rights activist.

== Early life and education ==
Mesfin Woldermariam was born on 23 April 1930 in Addis Ababa, Ethiopian Empire. Mesfin received his early education at Teferi Mekonnen School, and was a student of the Ethiopian Orthodox Church, receiving ordination as a deacon in 1946. He completed his further education in London in 1951, and won a scholarship to study abroad. He received his BA from Punjab University, Chandigarh in 1955 and his MA and Ph.D. from Clark University in 1977 by dissertation rural vulnerability to famine in Ethiopia. Mesfin was professor of geography at Haile Selassie University (now Addis Ababa University), and for a time was head of the geography department. He was also a senior Fulbright scholar in 1971, 1986 and 1987. He retired in 1991.

== Political activism ==
Responding to a student petition, on 8 April 2001 Mesfin and Berhanu Nega held a day-long panel discussion at the hall of the National Lottery on academic freedom. They were arrested on the allegations that this panel incited a student protest at AAU the next day, but released on bail 5 June and neither were ever tried.

In November 2005, the government of Ethiopia detained Mesfin on charges of treason, genocide and outrage against the constitution, along with other leading members of the Coalition for Unity and Democracy. This charge was considered to criminalize actions of free speech, freedom of association and freedom of expression that are guaranteed by international human rights laws, and has been condemned by many international observers including Amnesty International, Human Rights Watch and the European Union. He was held at Kaliti Prison. During his incarceration, Mesfin took part in two hunger strikes in December 2005 and January 2006, protesting his detention and trial. He later contracted pneumonia, collapsing in his prison cell 18 August, and was taken to the hospital. The court was supposed to deliver the verdict on 19 February 2007. However, Mesfin, and 37 others were pronounced guilty on 11 June 2007.

This judgment occurred after Mesfin refused to defend himself, insisting that the arrest, charges, detention and trial were politically motivated and that the trial was not likely to be fair. Along with 37 others, he was convicted on the basis of the prosecution evidence and prevented from making a statement in court after the prosecution case ended. The prosecutor is said to have presented video and audio evidence. The judge ruled that as they had not submitted a defense and were guilty as charged.

Mesfin, along with the 37 other Ethiopian opposition party officials, prominent human rights defenders and journalists on trial with him, were freed on 20 July 2007. They received a pardon and had their political rights restored four days after most were sentenced to life in prison and others to prison terms of up to 15 years.

== Death and funeral ==
Mesfin died on 29 September 2020 from complications brought by COVID-19, at the age of 90. Mesfin's funeral took place on 6 October 2020, with many government officials, celebrities and family members attended. Professor Berhanu Nega, spokesperson of the House of Federation Tagesse Chaffo, the mayor of Addis Ababa Adanech Abebe, and the President of Oromia Region Shimeles Abdisa also presented.

In his funeral service statements, he was credited as the founder of the Ethiopian Human Rights Council (EHRCO) and he also conducted various researches on famine and drought related topics, various socio economic thematic areas.
