= Wubshet Ayele =

Ethiopian lawyer (born 1955)

- ውብሸት አየለ

Vice chairperson of the National Election Board of Ethiopia
- Incumbent
- Assumed office 13 June 2019
- Prime Minister: Abiy Ahmed

Personal details
- Born: 1955 (age 70–71) Addis Ababa, Ethiopian Empire
- Education: Addis Ababa University
- Occupation: Lawyer

Wubshet Ayele (Amharic: ውብሸት አየለ; born 1955) is an Ethiopian lawyer and politician who has served as deputy/vice chairman of the National Election Board of Ethiopia (NEBE) since 2019.

== Early life and career ==
Wubshet Ayele was born in Addis Ababa in 1955. He studied law at Addis Ababa University and graduated in 1988. He has worked in Ministry of Justice and other offices as legal advisor. He founded the first Center for Reconciliation and Mediation in Ethiopia and the first rehabilitation center that provide corrections for young prisoners. Since 2018, Wubshet was involved to reform of the National Election Board of Ethiopia (NEBE) and appointed as a member of the Election Board in 2020.

He also worked as advisor to the Federal Supreme Court on judicial reforms, as well as participated in various civic organizations and social movements, such as Alemayehu Haile Foundation, Pan African Lawyers Association, Ethio-Parents' School Parents Association, Cancer Associations and others. On 13 June 2019, the House of Peoples' Representatives (HoPR) appointed Wubshet as vice chair while Birtukan Mideksa has been the chairperson of the board.
