= Semayawi Party =

Former political party in Ethiopia (2012–2019)

- Chairman: Ato Yeshiwas Assefa
- Vice Chairman: Ato Sileshi Feyisa
- Founded: Early 2012
- Dissolved: May 2019
- Merged into: Ethiopian Citizens for Social Justice
- Headquarters: Addis Ababa, Ethiopia
- Ideology: Liberalism

The Semayawi Party or Blue Party was an Ethiopian political party established in 2012. The party operates throughout the country. Its ideology was liberalism and was uniquely fond of conservative and nationalist views and promotes individualism. In May 2019, the Blue Party was brought to an end when it merged with the Ethiopian Citizens for Social Justice.
