= Berhanu Nega =

Ethiopian politician (born 1958)

- ብርሃኑ ነጋ
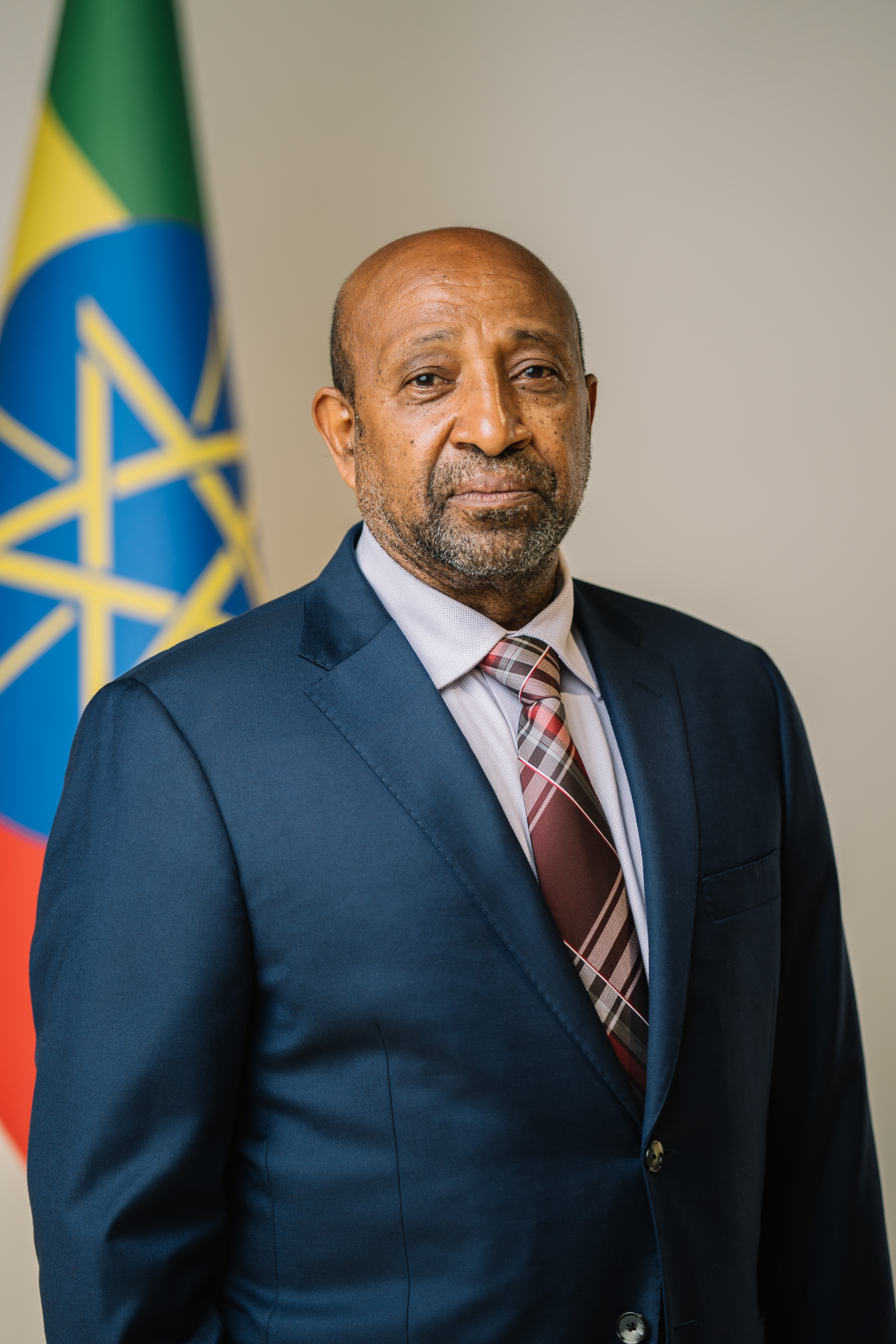
- Official portrait, 2025

Minister of Education
- Incumbent
- Assumed office 6 October 2021
- President: Sahle-Work Zewde; Taye Atske Selassie
- Prime Minister: Abiy Ahmed
- Preceded by: Getahun Mekuria

Chairman of the Ethiopian Citizens for Social Justice
- In office May 2019 – 6 March 2026
- Preceded by: Party established
- Succeeded by: Eyob Mesafint

Mayor-elect of Addis Ababa
- In office 20 August 2005 – 13 October 2005
- Preceded by: Arkebe Oqubay
- Succeeded by: Berhane Deressa (acting)

Personal details
- Born: 6 December 1958 (age 67) Debre Zeyit, Shewa Province, Ethiopian Empire (now Bishoftu, Oromia Region, Ethiopia)
- Party: Ethiopian Citizens for Social Justice
- Other political affiliations: Ethiopian People's Revolutionary Party; Coalition for Unity and Democracy; Ginbot 7 Movement for Justice, Freedom and Democracy; Ethiopian Citizens for Social Justice
- Spouse: Nardos Minasse
- Children: 2
- Education: Addis Ababa University; State University of New York at New Paltz (BS); The New School (PhD)
- Occupation: Economics professor; politician

Berhanu Nega (Amharic: ብርሃኑ ነጋ; born 6 December 1958) is an Ethiopian politician who is serving as the current Minister of Education since 2021. Berhanu was the founder of Ethiopian Citizens for Social Justice in May 2019, and served as the chairman until March 2026. He previously was the mayor-elect of Addis Ababa, Ethiopia, in the 2005 Ethiopian general elections. He is a founding chairman of the Rainbow Ethiopia: Movement for Democracy and Social Justice and a Deputy Chairman of Coalition for Unity and Democracy (CUD), for whom he served as chief election campaign strategist. He is also the co-founder and leader of Ginbot 7, an anti-government rebel group. Until mid-2018, he was labelled a terrorist by the Ethiopian government.

== Early life ==
Berhanu was born on 6 December 1958 in Debrezeit, the son of Ato Nega Bonger (d. 2021), a prominent businessman, and Woizero Abebech Woldegiorgis, the second-eldest of 12 children. He attended Addis Ababa University where he participated in the student movement against the ruling Derg government in his freshman year. When the government acted against political dissidents in 1977, Berhanu with other radical student activists fled to Mount Asimba in northern Ethiopia. After a division within the Ethiopian People's Revolutionary Party (EPRP), he was detained for openly criticizing killings within the EPRP. After a few months, he was released by his captors and crossed into the Sudan where he lived for two years until he was granted political asylum in the United States.

He did his undergraduate degree in economics at the State University of New York at New Paltz and got his PhD in economics from the New School for Social Research, in New York City. During that time, he became one of the organizers of an annual conference on the "Horn of Africa" that debated and analyzed the political, social and economic conditions in the sub-region. For over five years, it served as a forum for intellectual dialogue among political leaders, policy analysts and researchers interested in developments in that part of Africa.

Having completed his PhD studies, he joined the faculty of economics at Bucknell University, where he became a lecturer in economics for three years. Later he founded Imbilta, a bi-monthly magazine focusing on economic, political, social and current affairs in Ethiopia and he was the founding chairman of Ethiopian Economic Association.

== Return to Ethiopia ==
Berhanu, with his wife and his two children, Noah and Iyassu, returned to Ethiopia in 1994. Berhanu became an entrepreneur and founded the Ethiopian Agro-Maize, a fertilizer-producing company, and Addis Village Family Home Builders. Berhanu has also served as a lecturer at the Addis Ababa University, Department of Economics. From 1996 to 2000, he served as the president of the Ethiopian Economic Association. He has also served as the head of the Ethiopian Economic Policy Research Institute, a non-profit organization that he helped to establish. He also did consulting work for the United Nations Economic Commission for Africa.

On 8 April 2001 Berhanu and Professor Mesfin Woldemariam held a day-long panel discussion at the hall of the National Lottery on academic freedom, which was followed by student protest on the main campus of Addis Ababa University. They were arrested on the allegations that this panel incited a student protest at Addis Ababa University the next day, but were released on bail on 5 June, and neither were ever tried.

== The 2005 general election ==
During the 2005 elections, Berhanu debated Meles Zenawi. Despite the post-election political impasse, CUD members, who had won 137 of the 138 seats on the city council, met on 20 August and elected Berhanu mayor of Addis Ababa. Dr. Admasu Gebeyehu and Assefa Habtewold were elected Deputy Mayor and Speaker of the city assembly respectively at the same meeting.

However, the October protests led to Berhanu's imprisonment, along with CUD chairman Hailu Shawul, Professor Mesfin Woldemariam, and Former Senior UN Prosecutor Dr. Yacob Haile-Mariam and other leaders of the CUD, as well as a number of civil rights activists and independent journalists. They were charged with genocide and treason. Amnesty International and the European Union recognized the prisoners as political prisoners and requested immediate and unconditional release.

While in Kaliti Prison, Berhanu wrote and published a book Yenetsanet Goh Siked ("The Dawn of Freedom"), which was published, according to the print on the book, in Kampala, Uganda by MM Publisher May 2006. However the real publishers were a group of young intellectuals in cooperation with Alafa printers that is located in Addis Ababa. The book, over 600 pages long, was highly popular and was sold out in its first weekend, selling out over 10,000 copies and garnering a black market with price 5 times its retail - so much so that the government started harassing people found with the book, stopping traffic and searching cars, while the public was selling copies of the book in black market. More copies were brought in from outside as local publishers were afraid of publishing the book.

== After imprisonment ==
In the 2005 Addis Ababa city countil election, Berhanu's CUD party won 137 seats of the 138 seats. The elected council members of the party held an election for mayor and elected Berhanu to be the mayor. Then, the ruling party refused to hand in the city and eventually imprisoned all the leaders of the party including Berhanu. After 21 months in prison along with all opposition leader, Berhanu left the country in 2007 and returned to teach at the economics department of Bucknell at Bucknell University. While in the U.S., Berhanu announced the founding of a new political group, Ginbot 7, as the old one was dismantled by the government. Ginbot 7, established to pursue civil resistance through an all-inclusive means, attracted thousands of people in Ethiopia and abroad. Ginbot 7 now is one of the prominent opposition organizations fighting for liberty and democracy in Ethiopia.

The ruling government claimed on 24 April 2009 that it had foiled a coup attempt led by members of Ginbot 7 to overthrow the government, arresting 35 people they claimed were part of the plot. Those arrested included General Tefera Mamo, Berhanu's cousin Getu Worku, and Tsige Habte-Mariam, the 80-year-old father of another well-known opposition figure at the time in exile, Andargachew Tsige. Ginbot 7 has claimed this allegation is part of the government's overall suppression of dissent by accusing its opponents of illegal activities and sentencing them in a kangaroo court.

In late 2009 an Ethiopian court sentenced Berhanu to death, in absentia, along with four others (who were also sentenced in absentia), while 33 were sentenced to life in prison. Berhanu became a full professor at Bucknell University on spring of 2015.

In July 2015, Berhanu went to Eritrea, to permanently join the "freedom fighters" that have been receiving help from the government of Isayas Afewerki, a long time leader of the Red Sea state. In January 2016, he returned to the United States to "update" his supporters and raise funds for his organization.

== 2018 reform and return to Ethiopia ==
Following the ascent of Abiy Ahmed to the premiership and the resultant opening of the political scene (including the high-profile release of Ginbot 7's secretary-general, Andargachew Tsige), charges were dropped against Berhanu, as part of a wide-scale, unilateral amnesty and he returned to Ethiopia to reassume the role of peaceful political opposition. In May 2019, Berhanu's Ginbot 7 merged with six other conservative-nationalist opposition parties, including the Unity for Democracy and Justice and Blue Party to form the Ethiopian Citizens for Social Justice (EZEMA) party, of which Berhanu was elected leader.

== Ministry of Education ==
After the 2021 Ethiopian general election, the Prosperity Party led by PM Abiy Ahmed won a landslide victory. As a result, Prime Minister Abiy Ahmed formed a new government. Berhanu Nega's party EZEMA won 4 seats. As promised during his election campaign, PM Abiy invited opposition party leaders who participated in the election to join for a cabinet position. On 6 October 2021, Berhanu Nega was appointed Minister of Education by PM Abiy Ahmed. Later that day the House of Peoples' Representatives approved his appointment along with other Ministers. The working handover of power from the preceding Minister of Education, Getahun Mekuria, to Berhanu took place on 13 October 2021.

== Personal life ==
Berhanu married Dr. Nardos Minasse, an Ethiopian-born American optometrist, in 1989. They have two children together—Noah, an engineering graduate from Carnegie Mellon University, and Iyassu, a graduate of the University of Pennsylvania and Harvard Business School working in finance. His family continues to live in Pennsylvania where his wife, Dr. Nardos, practices optometry. Berhanu is a fan of Arsenal F.C, the Cleveland Cavaliers, and the Philadelphia Eagles.
