= All Ethiopian Unity Party =

The All Ethiopian Unity Party (Amharic: የመላው ኢትዮጵያ አንድነት ፓርቲ) was a political party in Ethiopia founded in 2002. Members split off of the All-Amhara People's Organization over whether or not the party should remain ethnically-oriented. At the legislative elections on 15 May 2005, the party was part of the Coalition for Unity and Democracy that won 109 out of 527 seats.
