= National Election Board of Ethiopia =

Ethiopian autonomous government agency

- የኢትዮጵያ ብሔራዊ ምርጫ ቦርድ; Ye-Ītyōṗṗyā Biḥērawī Mirich’a Borid

Agency overview
- Formed: 1991
- Jurisdiction: Ethiopian government
- Headquarters: Airport Road, Addis Ababa, Ethiopia; 9.008414°N 38.764329°E
- Agency executives: Melatework Hailu, Chairperson; Wubshet Ayele, Deputy
- Website: nebe.org.et/en

The National Election Board of Ethiopia (NEBE) (Amharic: የኢትዮጵያ ብሔራዊ ምርጫ ቦርድ, romanized: Ye-Ītyōṗṗyā Biḥērawī Mirich’a Borid) is an autonomous federal government agency which supervises the national elections of Ethiopia. The NEBE was established by Proclamation number 64/1992, and answers to the House of Peoples' Representatives. Melatework Hailu is the current chairperson of NEBE since 19 December 2023.

== History ==
NEBE was established in 1991 subsequently appointing Kemal Bedri as its founding chairman. The agency would preside over the 1992 local elections as well as the 1994 Ethiopian Constituent Assembly election.

The election board was however made official by Article 102 of the 1995 Constitution of Ethiopia.

Article 102
Election Board

1. There shall be established a National Election Board independent of any influence, to conduct in an impartial manner free and fair election in Federal and State constituencies.

2. Members of the Board shall be appointed by the House of Peoples' Representatives upon recommendation of the Prime Minister. Particulars shall be determined by law.

== Chairpersons History ==
Chairperson
Kemal Bedri (1994 - 2007)
Merga Bekana (1999 - 2009)
Samia Zekaria (2018 - 2019)
Birtukan Mideksa (2019 - 2023)
Melatework Hailu (as of June 2026)

== Structure ==
The NEBE consists of two components: the Board and the Secretariat. According to Article 6 of the amended Proclamation number 532/2006, the Board of the NEBE consists of nine members who are nominated by the prime minister and appointed by the House of Peoples' Representatives. These members are selected based on national diversity, and gender representation. The Secretariat is the operational branch of NEBE. The Secretariat is headed by a Chief Executive, and has the responsibility for the preparation and conduct of the electoral process.

== Reforms ==
In November 2018, during the prime ministership of Abiy Ahmed that started in April 2018 promising major reforms, the judge Birtukan Mideksa was appointed as the head of NEBE replacing incumbent Samia Zekaria.

== See also ==
- Elections in Ethiopia
