= Ginbot 7 =

Political party in Ethiopia

Ginbot 7 ግንቦት 7
- Leader: Berhanu Nega
- Chairperson: Berhanu Nega
- General Secretary: Andargachew Tsige
- Founder: Andargachew Tsige; Berhanu Nega
- Founded: 2008
- Merged into: Ginbot 7 Movement for Justice Freedom and Democracy
- Headquarters: Ethiopia; Eritrea
- Ideology: Civic nationalism Ethiopian nationalism

Ginbot 7 (Amharic: ግንቦት 7) is an Ethiopian opposition political organization, founded in 2008 by Andargachew Tsige and Berhanu Nega.

According to their mission statement, Ginbot 7's goal is "the realization of a national political system in which government power and political authority is assumed through peaceful and democratic process based on the free will and choice of citizens of the country." According to the US State Department Human Rights report of 2011, Ginbot 7 "espouses violent overthrow of the (Ethiopian) government". According to The New Yorker in 2014, Ginbot 7 are "an exiled pro-democracy party that the Ethiopian government labelled a terrorist group in 2011, under a vague and widely condemned proclamation."

== History ==
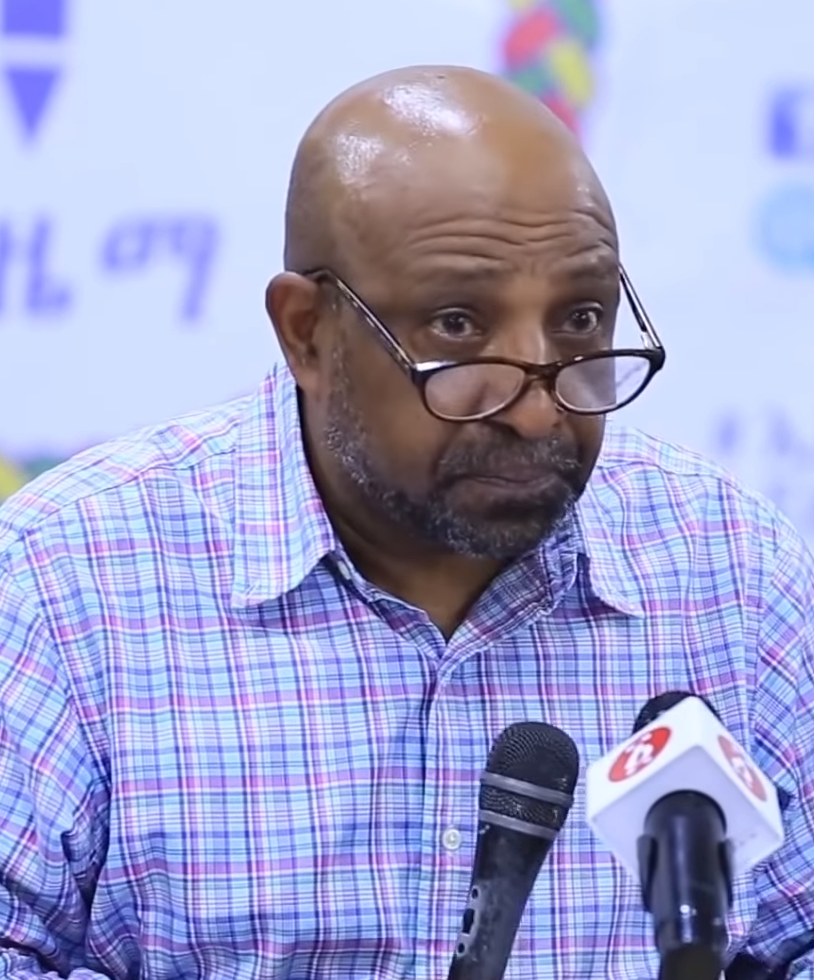
Berhanu Nega is the founder and was leading figure of the party

Ginbot 7 means "15 May", the date of the 2005 Ethiopian general election, which was "marred by protests over alleged fraud that led to the deaths of about 200 people." Ginbot 7 allied with many political organizations and freedom movements. In October 2016, it signed an understanding to work with Afar Peoples Party, Sidama People's Democratic Movement, Tigray Peoples Democratic Movement (TPDM) and Oromo Democratic Front (ODF). In January 2015, it signed a unification agreement with the Ethiopian People's Patriotic Front, the first movement that stood on Eritrean soil to make a military struggle to overthrow the EPRDF/TPLF government. Before 2015, the EPPF movement was led by Meazaw Getu as chairman, Mengistu Wolde Selassie as Political Head, Kifetew Assefa as head of intelligence and information and Nurjeba Assefa as Foreign Affairs Head. Ginbot 7 at the time had Berhanu Nega as chairman, Abebe Bogale as Vice Chair, and Ameneshewa Tahelew also known as Assefa Maru as Head of military operations before the unification.

After unification, their name changed to "Patriotic Ginbot 7 Movement for Unity and Democracy". From the unification afterwards, a new committee of 82 members with 41 members from each Front was formed, and a new executive committee with Berhanu Nega as a chairman, Meazaw Getu as Vice Chair, Zemene Kassie as political head and Ameneshewa Tahelew also known as Assefa Maru as head of military operations. This unification was fruitful and in the interest of many Ethiopians. It brought some hope in the Ethiopian camp at the time of hopelessness and oppression (especially after the kidnapping of the Ginbot 7 Secretary General Andargachew Tsige while transiting through Yemen). As the objective of these two movements was the same, their unification was natural. Ginbot 7 was much of a collection of active politicians that fled Ethiopia in fear of persecution and some even having a death sentence on their head. Ethiopian Peoples Patriotic Front leaders and members, on the other hand, spent their lives in the front for decades, having a well-tested military skill and determination.

After unification, the Movement was getting stronger as the people's resistance in Ethiopia was becoming strong and fierce against the government. In the middle of the chaotic situation in Ethiopia in August 2009, the Patriotic Ginbot 7 Movement for Unity and Democracy has made a leadership change. It also asserted a three-year plan to overthrow the TPLF/EPRDF government. The new central committee of the Movement has 13 members. Berhanu Nega stayed as chairman, and the new committee has four sub committees: Political sub led by Ephrem Madebo, civil disobedience subcommittee led by Dr. Tadesse Biru, Secretariat subcommittee led by Mequanint Abeje – later replaced by Jankebed Zerihun, and the People's Resistance or Military Operations subcommittee headed by Ameneshewa Tahelew. Later, his release from prison Andargachew Tsige was assigned as Secretary of the Movement. In 2010, Ginbot 7 reportedly allied with the Afar People's Party and the Ethiopian Movement for Unity and Justice to create a coalition called the "Alliance for Liberty, Equality and Justice in Ethiopia" (ALEJE). Until mid-2018, Ginbot 7 was considered a terrorist organization by Ethiopia and the IGAD.

== Notable members, past and present ==
- Berhanu Nega, co-founder and leader of Ginbot 7, and chairman of ALEJE.
- Andargachew Tsige, founder and secretary general of Ginbot 7.

== Coup allegations ==
On 24 April 2009, the Ethiopian government claimed, through the Ethiopian News Agency, that it had foiled a coup attempt led by members of Ginbot 7 to overthrow the government. Ginbot 7 described the allegation that it had attempted a coup as a "baseless accusation" that fitted a pattern of distraction and scapegoating by the government.
