= 2005 Ethiopian general election =

- 15 May 2005

All 547 seats to the House of Peoples' Representatives 274 seats needed for a majority
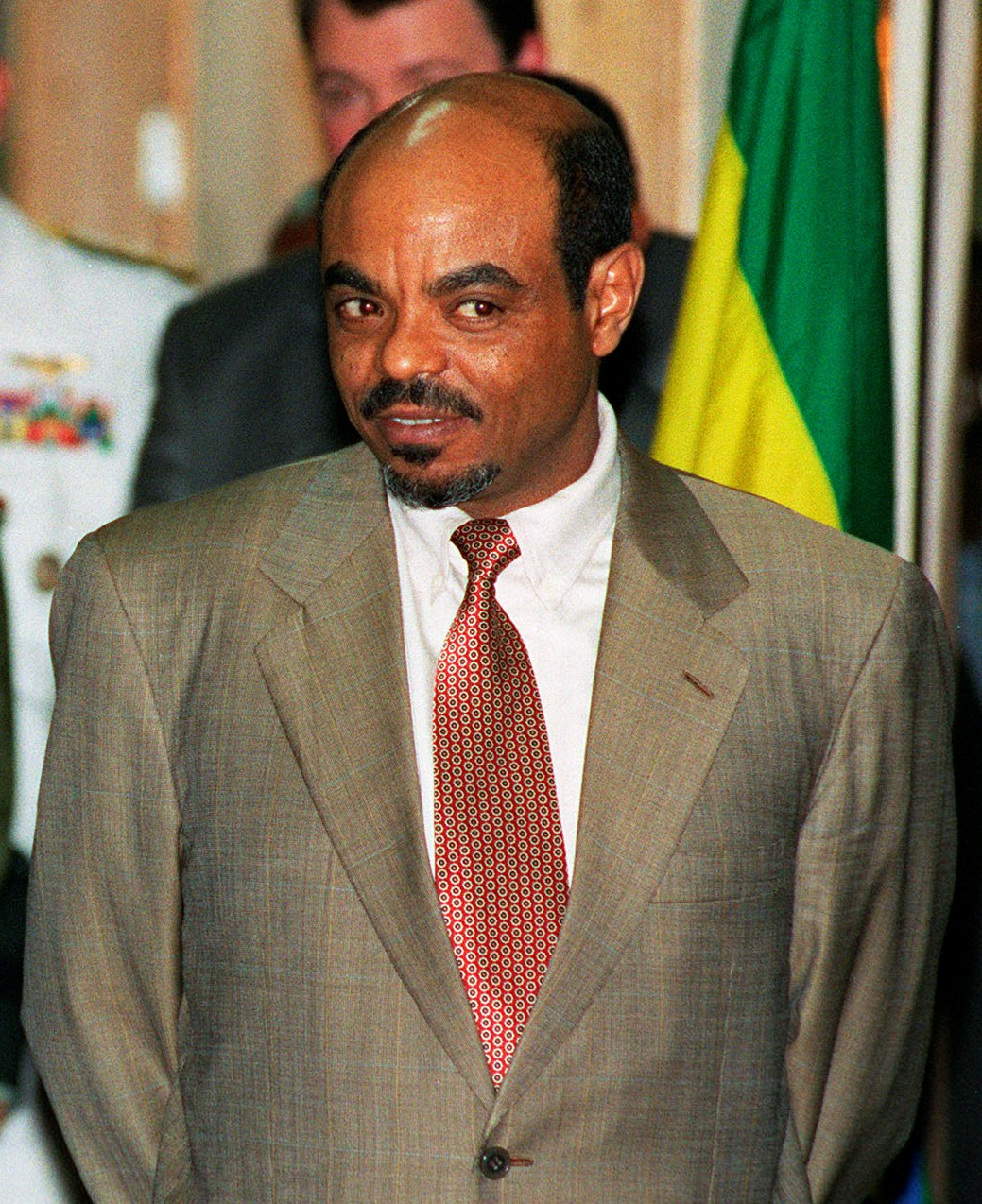
	First party	Second party	Third party
Leader	Meles Zenawi	Hailu Shawul	Beyene Petros
Party	Tigray People's Liberation Front	All Ethiopian Unity Party	Ethiopian Social Democratic Party
Alliance	Ethiopian People's Revolutionary Democratic Front	Coalition for Unity and Democracy	United Ethiopian Democratic Forces
Last election	481	did not stand	did not stand
Seats won	327	109	53
Seat change	▼154	New	New
Popular vote	12,237,655	3,983,690	2,058,294
Percentage	62.65%	20.39%	10.54%
Prime Minister before election
Meles Zenawi
EPRDF
Prime Minister
Meles Zenawi
EPRDF

General elections were held in Ethiopia on 15 May 2005, for seats in the House of Peoples' Representatives and four regional government councils. Under pressure from the international community, Prime Minister Meles Zenawi promised that this election would be proof that more democracy would come in this multi-ethnic nation; international elections observers from the European Union (EU) and the U.S.-based Carter Center were present to observe the results. This election succeeded in attracting about 90% of the registered voters to the polls. A government ban on protests was imposed throughout the election period.

== Campaigning ==
EU observers remarked on the "significantly enlarged freedoms for political campaigning in comparison to previous elections". Political parties campaigned actively, and opposition parties appeared to be increasingly active in the rural areas. The observer mission described the atmosphere "during the campaign was calm, culminating in two massive, peaceful rallies in Addis Ababa, one by the EPRDF and one by the opposition."

Despite this, opposition parties alleged numerous cases of intimidation, and arrests of its supporters. While the EU observers could not investigate all of the alleged cases, it did confirm those it investigated. International human rights groups likewise cataloged a number of cases of human rights violations. However, the EU observers wrote in their final report, they "recorded no arrests of EPRDF supporters for campaign offences."

Towards the close of the campaigning, the language became more vicious, with each side accusing the other of numerous violations of the campaigning rules. "Campaign rhetoric became insulting," the EU observer's report noted, then continued:

The most extreme example of this came from the Deputy Prime Minister, Addisu Legesse, who, in a public debate on 15 April, compared the opposition parties with the Interhamwe militia, which perpetrated the 1994 Rwandan genocide. The Prime Minister made the same comparison on 5 May in relation to the CUD. The EPRDF made the same associations during its free slots on radio and TV. The opposition coalition UEDF then used the comparison against the government in a TV spot showing footage of the movie "Hotel Rwanda". Such rhetoric is unacceptable in a democratic election.

== Early results ==
Early results showed the opposition with a big lead, sweeping all of the contested seats in the capital Addis both in the race for parliamentary as well as local government. By the afternoon of 16 May, the opposition claimed it was halfway towards winning a majority in the national parliament with only about a third of the constituencies reporting complete results. Later that day, trailing badly in the preliminary report covering just under 200 seats released by the National Election Board, the ruling Ethiopian People's Revolutionary Democratic Front (EPRDF) announced that it had won more than 317 seats out of 547, while conceding that opposition parties won all 23 seats in the capital city Addis Ababa. The two major opposition parties, the Coalition for Unity and Democracy (CUD) and the United Ethiopian Democratic Forces (UEDF) claimed on that same day that they had won 185 of the approximately 200 seats for which the National Election Board of Ethiopia (NEBE) had released preliminary results. That was a significant improvement over the 12 seats the opposition had in the previous parliament.

By law, the NEBE was required to announce the official results on 8 June. However, the vote tallying process was jeopardized when the opposition claimed that the Addis Ababa vote was rigged and during the evening of 16 May, the Prime Minister declared a state of emergency, outlawed any public gathering, assumed direct command of the security forces, and replaced the capital city police with federal police and special forces drawn from elite army units. The NEBE, simultaneously, ordered the vote tallying process to stop, an order which was not rescinded for nearly a week, yet another action against which the opposition and the independent election monitors strongly objected.

The next official report from the NEBE, released on 27 May, showed that the EPRDF had won 209 seats, and affiliated parties 12 more. The report indicated the opposition parties had won 142 seats. "These results are provisional, and these results could change because we are looking into complaints by some of the parties," said NEBE spokesman Getahun Amogne.

== Alleged voting irregularities ==
Observers from the European Union afterwards "assessed the closing and counting processes negatively in almost half of urban polling stations observed, a very high figure for international observers to record, and even worse in rural polling stations observed." Counting was slow, a remarkably high number of ballots were ruled invalid, and there was a lack of transparency in the results. "Result sheets were only displayed at 29 per cent of rural polling stations observed and 36 per cent of urban polling stations observed at the completion of counting. In 25 per cent of polling stations observed, political party representatives were not provided with a copy of the results."

The situation only deteriorated with the following day, according to the observers,

starting with a blanket ban, issued immediately after the end of voting, on freedom of assembly in the capital. Media coverage also worsened. State media published statements by government/EPRDF personnel claiming victory in the elections, despite the fact that counting was still underway, but refused to publish opposition statements. Incidents involving students started on the night of 5 June and extended on 6 and 7 June with hundreds being arrested. During a demonstration in Addis Ababa on 8 June, security forces killed at least 36 citizens and in the aftermath arrested thousands of persons, mostly linked to the opposition, who were accused of spreading "political unrest".

The CUD lodged complaints in 139 constituencies, the UEDF lodged 89 complaints, while the EPRDF has raised concerns over irregularities in more than 50 seats. Including the complaints lodged by small parties, complaints concerning the results in 299 parliamentary seats were lodged. According to an official of the NEBE, political parties had until June 3 to provide evidence of fraud, or their complaints would be dismissed. However investigations led to elections being re-run at a minimum of 16 voting stations, and affecting elections for at least six seats. Writing in November of that year, scholar Christopher Clapham noted that "the official results of the elections are both complex in themselves, and deeply affected by fraud". On one hand, he pointed out that the EPRDF lost heavily in those cities of Ethiopia which were bellwethers of public opinion; on the other,

some of the constituencies declared for the EPRDF defy any plausible assessment of public opinion in the areas concerned: that it should have won about half of the seats both in Sidama and in western Welega, for instance, is entirely incredible. In Sidama, as a result of the May 2002 massacre, and in western Welega, as the heartland of OLF support, hostility to the regime runs very deep, and the declared results can only be the result either of heavy-handed government pressure before and during the vote, or else of fraud after it.

Provisional results were scheduled to be released on May 23, but the need to investigate claims of voting irregularities and disruptions in two southern regions — Southern Nations, Nationalities, and Peoples Region and Oromia — delayed the release of these results until June 8, the date originally scheduled for releasing the official results. When the ruling party was unofficially reported the winner of the election, demonstrations protesting alleged election fraud broke out, and continued into June. Hundreds of students were arrested in at least nine cities, including Gondar, Bure, Bahir Dar, Debre Marqos, Dessie and Awassa for demonstrating despite a month-old ban on protests imposed on the government. At the same time, security forces arrested dozens of locally prominent CUD members in Gondar, Dessie, Wondo Genet, Kombolcha and Jinka; unconfirmed reports of arrests following a similar pattern came from several other towns. On June 8, police shot 42 people gathering at the Piazza and Merkato markets of Addis Ababa. The government afterwards stated that an appropriate level of force was used and accused the CUD of fomenting dissent; the CUD denied these accusations, and claimed that the government was attempting to distract attention from election fraud. This led to the leaders of the CUD, including head Hailu Shawul, being put under house arrest while hundreds of security forces patrolled the streets of the capital.

== Official results ==
Ethiopian 2005 general election results. Only parties with more than 10 seats shown. Red: EPRDF Blue: CUD Green: UEDF Light red: SPDP Light green: OFDM Grey: Others

On July 8, the NEBE released the first official results for 307 of the 547 national parliamentary seats. Of the 307 seats, the EPRDF had won 139, while CUD and UEDF won 93 and 42, respectively. Smaller parties and independent candidates won the remaining 33 seats. However, Berhanu Nega, vice-chairman of the CUD, had criticized the process on July 20, claiming that "The investigation process was a complete failure. Our representatives and witnesses have been harassed, threatened, barred and killed upon their return from the hearings."

Meanwhile, the NEBE investigated voting fraud and other irregularities, while also arranging new polls to resolve some disputes. On August 9, official results were released, acknowledging that the ruling EPRDF had won 296 of the total 524 seats — about 56% — enabling it to form a government, while its allied parties won 22 seats. The UEDF won 52 seats. Berhanu said his party, which had officially won 109 seats, was debating whether they would challenge the results in court. Repeat elections were scheduled for August 21 in 31 areas where either irregularities were reported or results were challenged.

Opposition parties had decided to boycott the related August 21 elections in the Somali Region. The CUD withdrew 10 of the 17 candidates it was fielding in Somali region, while the Western Somali Democratic Party, the Somali Democratic Alliance Forces and Del Wabe People's Democratic Movement who had planned to field 43 candidates for the Federal Parliamentary Assembly and 273 candidates for the regional parliament in the regional capital of Jijiga, also announced that they would boycott this election.

On September 5, the NEBE released its final results, in which the EPRDF retained its control of the government with 327 seats; within the EPRDF, the Oromo People's Democratic Organization won 110 seats, the Southern Ethiopian People's Democratic Movement 92 seats, the Amhara National Democratic Movement 87 seats and the Tigray People's Liberation Front 38 seats. Opposition parties won 174 seats.

Party	Votes	%	Seats
Ethiopian People's Revolutionary Democratic Front			327
Coalition for Unity and Democracy			109
United Ethiopian Democratic Forces			53
Ethiopian Somali People's Democratic Party			24
Oromo Federalist Democratic Movement			11
Afar National Democratic Party			8
Benishangul-Gumuz People's Democratic Unity Front			8
Gambela People's Democratic Movement			3
Sheko and Mezenger People's Democratic Unity Organization			1
Hareri National League			1
Argoba Nationality Democratic Organization			1
Independents			1
Total			547
Total votes	22,610,690	–	
Registered voters/turnout	27,372,888	82.60	
Source: IPU

== Protest ==
Protests of the results, led by Coalition for Democracy and Unity, began on November 1, 2005, and have prompted more than 60,000 arrests. Live gunfire from government forces has been directed at protesters and bystanders, killing at least 42. A number of policemen were also killed suggesting that violence was not all on the side of the state.

=== Massacre claims and public inquiry ===
On October 18, 2006, the draft report of a 10-member public inquiry into election-related unrests was released to Associated Press (AP). It concludes that a total of 199 people (193 civilians and six policemen) were killed and 763 were injured, a significantly higher figure than the Ethiopian government's claim that 61 civilians and seven policemen were killed. The vice chairman of the inquiry, judge Wolde-Michael Meshesha, who fled Ethiopia a month prior after he had received anonymous death threats, told AP that "this was a massacre ... these demonstrators were unarmed yet the majority died from shots to the head." He added that the government attempted to pressure and intimidate members of the inquiry after learning about its controversial finding. The Ethiopian government did not immediately comment on the leaked report, but the next day, it told BBC that its contents were "hearsay." The European Union's chief observer during the elections, Ana Maria Gomes, stated that the draft report "only confirms what we have said in our report on the elections," and "that indeed there were massive human rights violations."
