= Meles Zenawi =

Prime Minister of Ethiopia from 1995 to 2012

- መለስ ዜናዊ
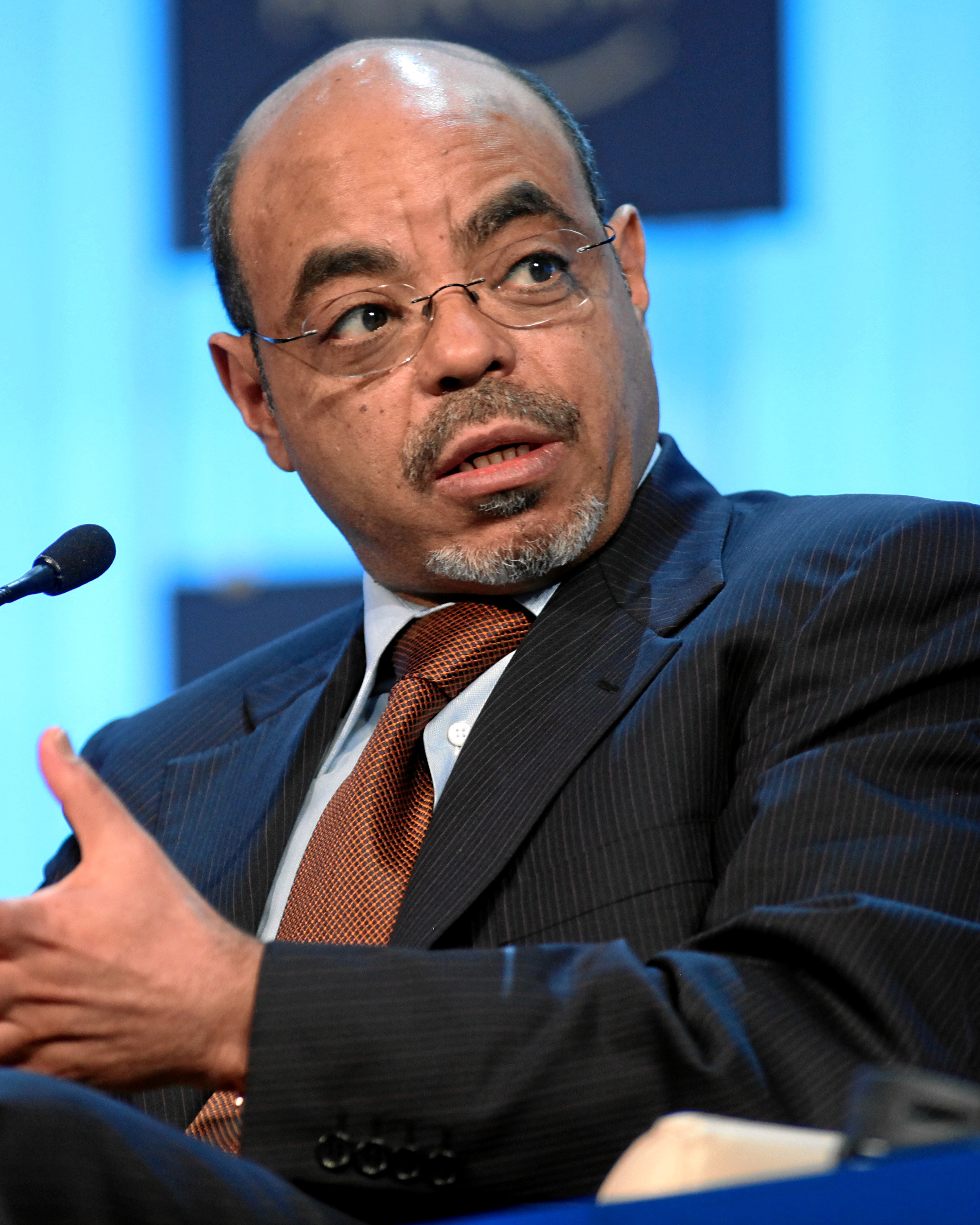
- Meles in 2012

Prime Minister of Ethiopia
- In office 22 August 1995 – 20 August 2012
- President: Negasso Gidada; Girma Wolde-Giorgis
- Preceded by: Tamirat Layne
- Succeeded by: Hailemariam Desalegn

Interim President of Ethiopia
- In office 28 May 1991 – 22 August 1995
- Prime Minister: Tesfaye Dinka; Tamirat Layne
- Preceded by: Tesfaye Gebre Kidan (Acting)
- Succeeded by: Negasso Gidada

Member of the House of Peoples' Representatives
- In office 19 May 1995 – 20 August 2012
- Constituency: Adwa

1st Chairman of the Ethiopian People's Revolutionary Democratic Front
- In office 8 May 1988 – 20 August 2012
- Preceded by: Party established
- Succeeded by: Hailemariam Desalegn

Personal details
- Born: Legesse Zenawi Asres; 9 May 1955 Adwa, Ethiopian Empire
- Died: 20 August 2012 (aged 57) Brussels, Belgium
- Party: Tigray People's Liberation Front
- Other political affiliations: Ethiopian People's Revolutionary Democratic Front; Marxist–Leninist League of Tigray
- Spouse: Azeb Mesfin
- Children: 3
- Education: Open University (MBA); Erasmus University Rotterdam (MSc)

Military service
- Allegiance: TPLF (1975–1991); Ethiopia (1991–2012)
- Battles/wars: Ethiopian Civil War; Insurgency in Ogaden; Eritrean–Ethiopian War; Somali Civil War (2006–2009)

Meles Zenawi Asres (Tigrigna and Amharic: መለስ ዜናዊ ኣስረስ; pronounced [mɛllɛs zenawi asrɛs]; born Legesse Zenawi Asres; 9 May 1955 – 20 August 2012) was an Ethiopian politician and former rebel militant commander who served as president of Ethiopia from 1991 to 1995 and as prime minister from 1995 until his death in 2012.

Born in Adwa to an Ethiopian father and an Eritrean mother, Meles became actively involved in politics after changing his original first name from Legesse to Meles, adopted following the execution of fellow university student Meles Takele by the Derg government in 1975. In that year, he left Haile Selassie I University to join the Tigray People's Liberation Front (TPLF) and fight against the Derg (the Mengistu Haile Mariam-led military dictatorship in Ethiopia). In 1989, he became the chairman of the TPLF, and the head of the Ethiopian People's Revolutionary Democratic Front (EPRDF) after its formation in 1988.

After leading the EPRDF to victory in the Ethiopian Civil War, he served as president of the Transitional Government of Ethiopia from 1991 to 1995, then as the 2nd prime minister of Ethiopia from 1995 to his death in 2012. Meles Zenawi's administration brought Ethiopia to ethnic federalism; he expressed his populist view that ethnic groups should share their own languages, culture and lands. An Eritrean referendum was held during his four-year presidency, which resulted in Eritrean secession from Ethiopia in 1993, but the two countries entered into a war owing to the territorial dispute from 1998 to 2000, during which 98,217 people were killed. In the 2005 general election, Meles's party EPRDF won and he remained as prime minister, while opposition parties strongly complained that the election was "stolen" and unfair. Shortly during and after the election, disastrous riots and protests sparked across Addis Ababa, in which 193 people were killed by police brutality.

During his tenure, Ethiopia became one of Africa's fastest-growing economies. Meles undertook major reforms to the country, including land reforms attempt to reduce serious droughts, school expansions, and agricultural interests. Meanwhile, his government described by many human rights groups and analysis as authoritarian, marked by perpetual personality cult, suppressing civil liberties by initiating government crackdowns, arresting political opponents and fueling ethnic clashes. "Zenawism" refers to his principles and policies of ethnic federalism, especially those the TPLF advocated, and is the subject of academic study. He died in Brussels, Belgium, on 20 August 2012 from an undisclosed illness.

== Early life and education ==
Meles was born in Adwa in northern Ethiopia, to Zenawi Asres, a Tigrayan from Adwa and Alemash Ghebreluel, an Eritrean from Adi Quala. He was the third of six children. His first name at birth was Legesse (thus Legesse Zenawi, Ge'ez: ለገሰ ዜናዊ legesse zēnāwī). He eventually became better known by his nom de guerre Meles, which he adopted in honor of university student and fellow Tigrayan Meles Tekle who was executed by the Derg government in 1975. He received primary education at Queen of Sheba Junior High School in Adwa. Because he started school at age 11 or 12 it took him 5 years to complete the regular 8-year program as he was able to skip grades. He then joined the prestigious General Wingate High school in Addis Ababa on full scholarship and completed high school in 1972. Upon graduating with honors from General Wingate, he was awarded the Haile Selassie I Prize, a selective award given only to the most outstanding students. In 1975, Meles left the university to join the Tigray People's Liberation Front.

Meles Zenawi was an Ethiopian Orthodox Christian.

== Early political career ==
=== Ethiopian Civil War (1974–1991) ===
Meles was first with the Tigrayan National Organization (TNO), the forerunner of the Tigray People's Liberation Front (TPLF). Aregawi Berhe, a former member of the TPLF, notes that historians John Young and Jenny Hammond "vaguely indicated" Meles as a founder of the TPLF in their books. Aregawi insists that both he and Sebhat Nega joined the Front "months" after it was founded. While a member of the TPLF, Meles established the Marxist-Leninist League of Tigray (MLLT).

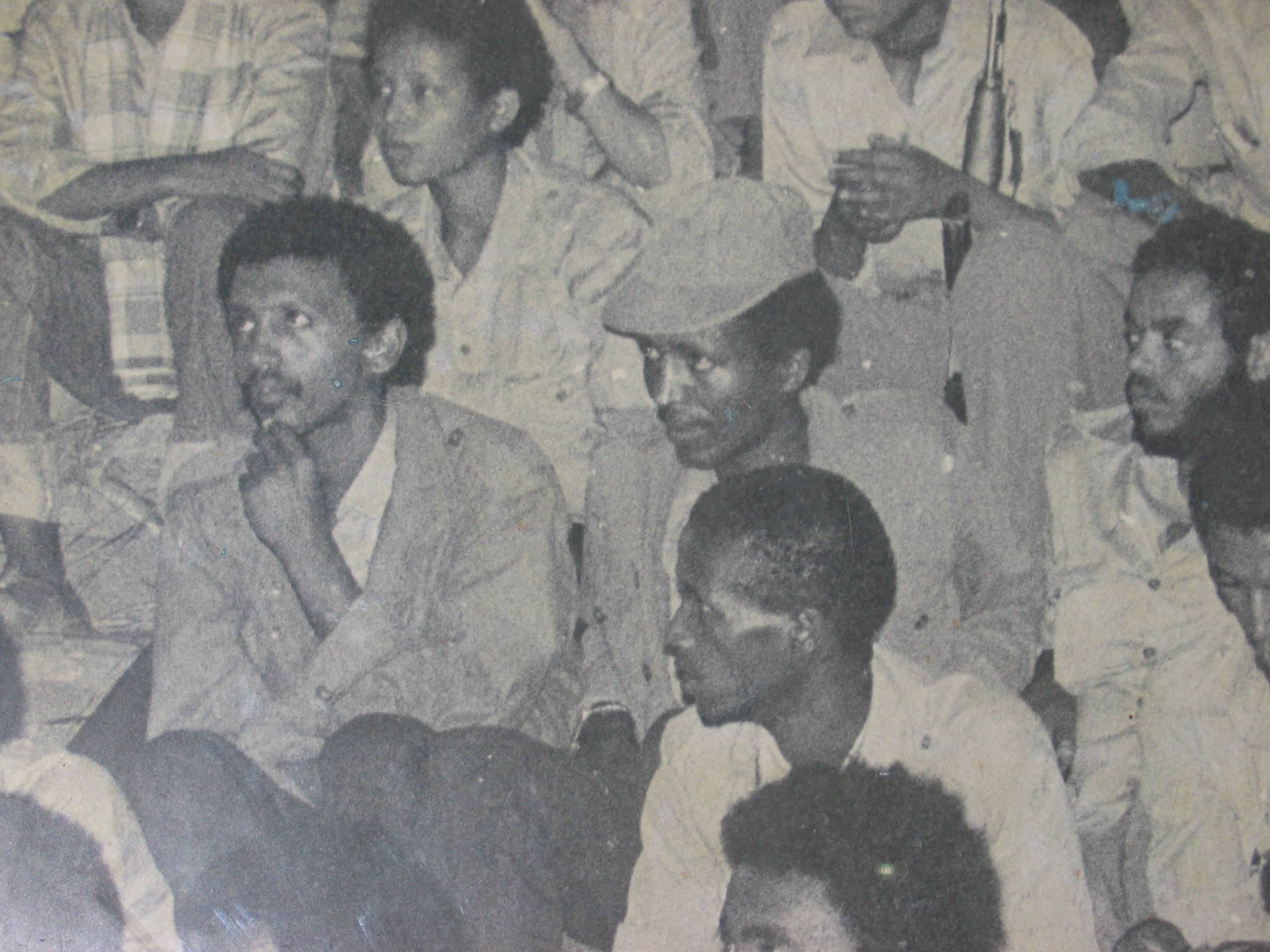
Meles (far right) sitting next to Bereket Simon in a 1970s political meeting

The TPLF was one of the armed groups struggling against the Derg, the junta which led Ethiopia from 1974 to 1991. Meles was elected member of the leadership committee in 1979 and chairman of the executive committee of TPLF in 1983. He was the chairperson of both the TPLF and the EPRDF. After the EPRDF assumed power at the end of the Ethiopian Civil War in 1991. He was president of the Transitional Government of Ethiopia during which he paved the way for Eritrea to secede from the country.

== President of Ethiopia (1991–1995) ==
=== Domestic affairs ===
Meles stated that EPRDF's victory was a triumph for the thousands of TPLF-fighters who were killed, for the millions of Ethiopians who were victims of the country's biggest famine during the Derg regime, when some estimates put up to 1.5 million deaths of Ethiopians from famine and the Red Terror. Accordingly, he maintained that the big support it received from peasants and rural areas helped EPRDF maintain peace and stability. Foreign support was diverse; the Arab League, as well as Western nations, supported the EPRDF rebels against the communist Soviet-supported government (although the TPLF was at the time Marxist) at the height of the Cold War.

"What the implications of this will be in terms of relations between Ethiopia and the European Union, we will have to wait and see but I don't think you will be surprised if Ethiopia were to insist that it should not be patronised."

The United States facilitated peace negotiations between the Ethiopian government and major rebel groups, including the EPRDF, bringing an end to the 17-year Ethiopian Civil War in 1991. The talks did not bear any fruit as EPRDF's force were moving to the capital and Mengistu fled the country. The United States agreed to support the EPRDF which would have, nevertheless, seized power without anyone's support. Many angry demonstrators in Addis Ababa reacted to this by protesting against Herman Cohen, the U.S. State Department's chief of African affairs who attended a conference that demonstrators viewed as legitimizing the EPRDF.

In July 1991, the Convention of Nationalities was held. It was the first Ethiopian multinational convention where delegates of various nations and organizations were given fair and equal representation and observed by various international organizations including the United Nations, Organization of African Unity, European Economic Community, and the United States and the United Kingdom.

=== Eritrean-Ethiopian relations ===
Although Meles and his administration claimed they preferred a united but federal state that included the Eritrean state, since Meles' TPLF fought together with EPLF, Meles did not have a choice but to leave the decision to Eritrean leadership in the hope that the independence referendum would vote against secession, according to Time magazine's 1991 analysis. The Eritreans were given the choice for independence or to stay in the union. They voted for independence on 24 May 1993, Isaias Afewerki became the leader of Eritrea. Meles was in Asmara, Eritrea as the keynote speaker. Many in the Meles administration, as well as opposition parties, were angry over the decision to grant Eritrea its independence.

Despite working together against the Derg regime, Meles and Isaias positive relationship turned sour after Meles succumbed to U.S. pressure to hold an election within a year, but Afewerki abandoned his original promise to create a transitional government in the early 1990s. The Eritrean-Ethiopian War began in May 1998 following the Eritrean troops invasion of Badme and parts of Sheraro woredas. Following the invasion, Ethiopia demanded the complete withdrawal of Eritrean forces from the disputed territories. When the Eritrean government refused to pull out, Ethiopian forces launched a major counteroffensive, capturing the disputed town of Badme along with significant portions of western Eritrea. Following these military gains, Ethiopian President Negaso Gidada announced an end to major offensive operations, and a formal peace agreement—the Algiers Agreement—was signed shortly thereafter, leading to the withdrawal of Ethiopian troops from Eritrean territory. Though Ethiopian troops controlled Badme, after the Boundary Commission, established in the Algiers Agreement (2000), ruled that Badme belonged to Eritrea, Ethiopia continued to maintain a presence of its soldiers in the town.

== Prime Minister of Ethiopia (1995–2012) ==
A new constitution was approved in 1994, providing for a parliamentary system. The president served as ceremonial head of state, with the prime minister as head of government and chief executive. The EPRDF handily won the 1995 elections, and Meles was sworn in as prime minister when the new Federal Democratic Republic of Ethiopia was formally inaugurated on 21 August 1995.

=== First term (1995–2000) ===
Meles was appointed as Prime Minister after the 1995 general election, and was chairman of the Tigray People's Liberation Front. Under his government, Meles encouraged privatization of government companies, farms, lands, and investments which reversed the previous Derg communist rule.

==== Ethnic federalism ====
Flag of Ethiopia since 1995. The radiant star insignia indicates equality between nations and nationalities of Ethiopia

Meles' government implemented ethnic based federalism as a response to what he considered to be the "old imperial rule of Amhara people". Meanwhile, the Oromo Liberation Front (OLF), while drafting the constitution counted Amharas and Tigrayans dominated the imperial rule likewise. Reasons posited the aim of ethnic federalism empowers all ethnic groups in Ethiopia to share their cultures and languages, and ethnic-based liberation front preferred to join the July Convention of Nationalities in 1991. Critic always commented this system brings to divisions, which on other hands, Meles argues it gives several interests, equitable distribution and wealth to them. He added that the system provides recourse to fight poverty, peasants must choice their own decisions in their own languages. Meles views emphasized an economic growth claiming "if you think it is threat, it will be; if you think it a benefit, then it will be. Ethnicity will become less an issue as the economy grows and Ethiopia's process of assimilation does its job."

His government criticized for decentralizing of language system. Critics concerned that this policy would fracture Ethiopian national identity. Regions of Ethiopia have their official state language. For example, Afaan Oromo is the official language of Oromia Region, Afar for Afar Region, Harari for Harari Region. Amharic is official working language to Amhara, Benishangul-Gumuz, Gambela, and Southern Nations, Nationalities, and People's Region.

==== Freedom of religion ====
Religion in Ethiopia (2016 estimate)
1. Ethiopian Orthodox (43.8%)
2. Muslim (31.3%)
3. Protestant (22.8%)
4. Catholic (0.70%)
5. Traditional faiths (0.60%)
6. Other (0.80%)

Meles' government allowed freedom of religion formally in 1991. Previous issues including Orthodox Church dominance prior 1974, seizure of church by the Derg regime, state sponsored persecution against non-Orthodox Christians, second-class citizenship accorded to Ethiopian Muslims, and land owning issues by non-Orthodox population almost resolved. However, most analysis stated that there was sporadic clashes since equality and rights granted by national or new religions.

==== Freedom of press ====
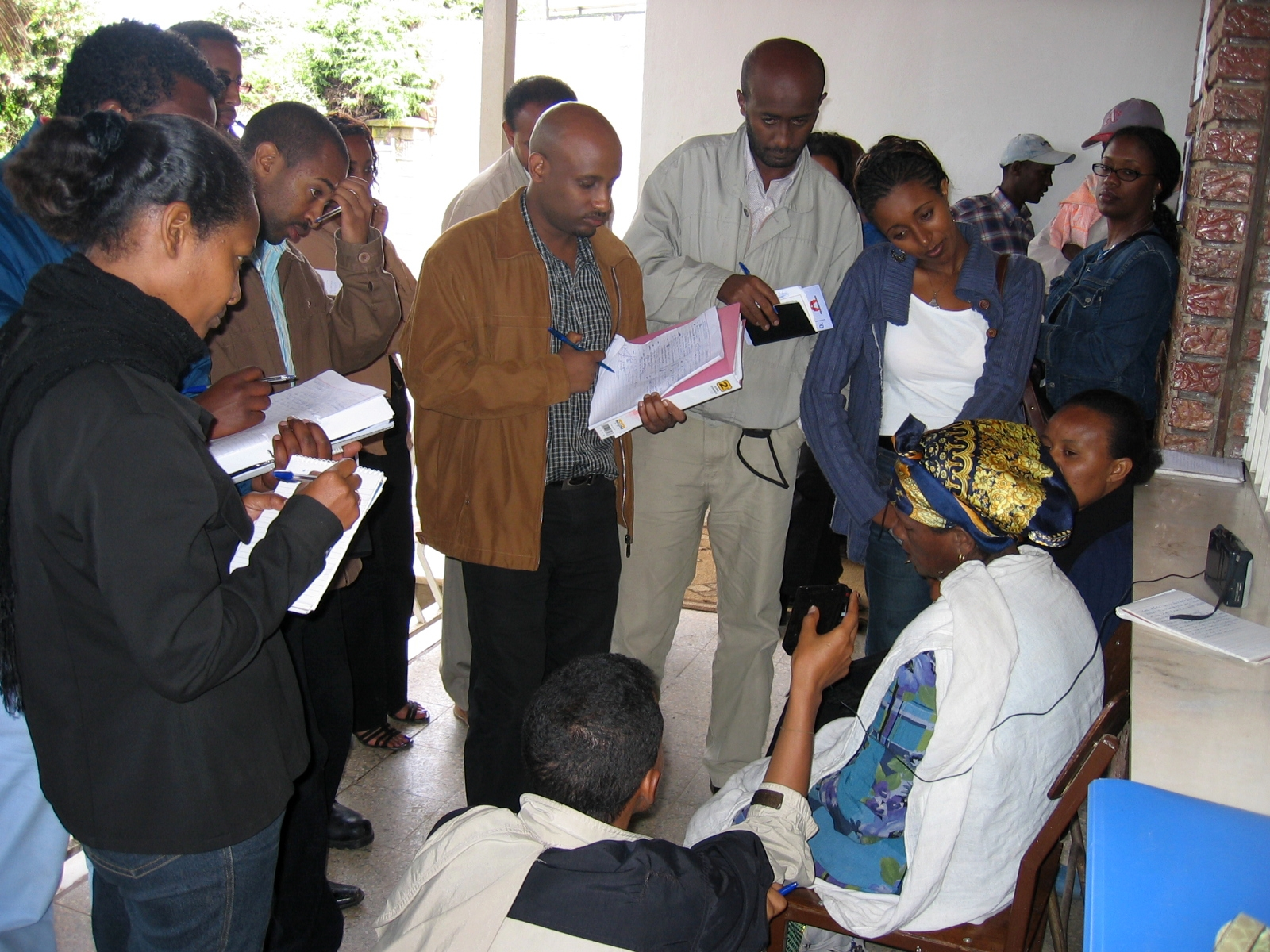
Journalists training in 2005

Prior to federalism, both the Haile Selassie and Derg government limited media rights. During Meles' administration, however, politically inflicted media organization became decelerated, while entertainment surging in opposite. It was believed that FM radio stations were licensed under regional governments, community organizations and private companies. The government licensed seven regional state television transmission agencies, but there are not private broadcasters in the country.

==== Equity and growth ====
Meles government advocated "pro-poor" domestic policy. According to World Bank's East African leadership, the Ethiopian government ranked first to share GDP for "pro-poor" sectors. It also created regional development to Amhara Development Association, Tigray Development Association, Oromia Development Association and many others. Meles government worked the country to economically grow steadily since he took an office. During the last seven years, Ethiopia's GDP growth had shown 9 percent of rate. The country also topped to the category "policies of social inclusion and equity" in domain of "economic management", while Ethiopia was successful scoring "structural policies" and "public sector management and institutions". Gross primary enrollment rate which was initially poor, went 93% in 2004 from 72% in 1990, raising literacy rate from 50% in 1997 to 65% in 2002. Opposition parties contested those growth rate, stating double-digit inflation comes from a result of ruling party government economic failure. Ethiopia became the fastest growing countries in Africa.

=== Second term (2000–2005) ===
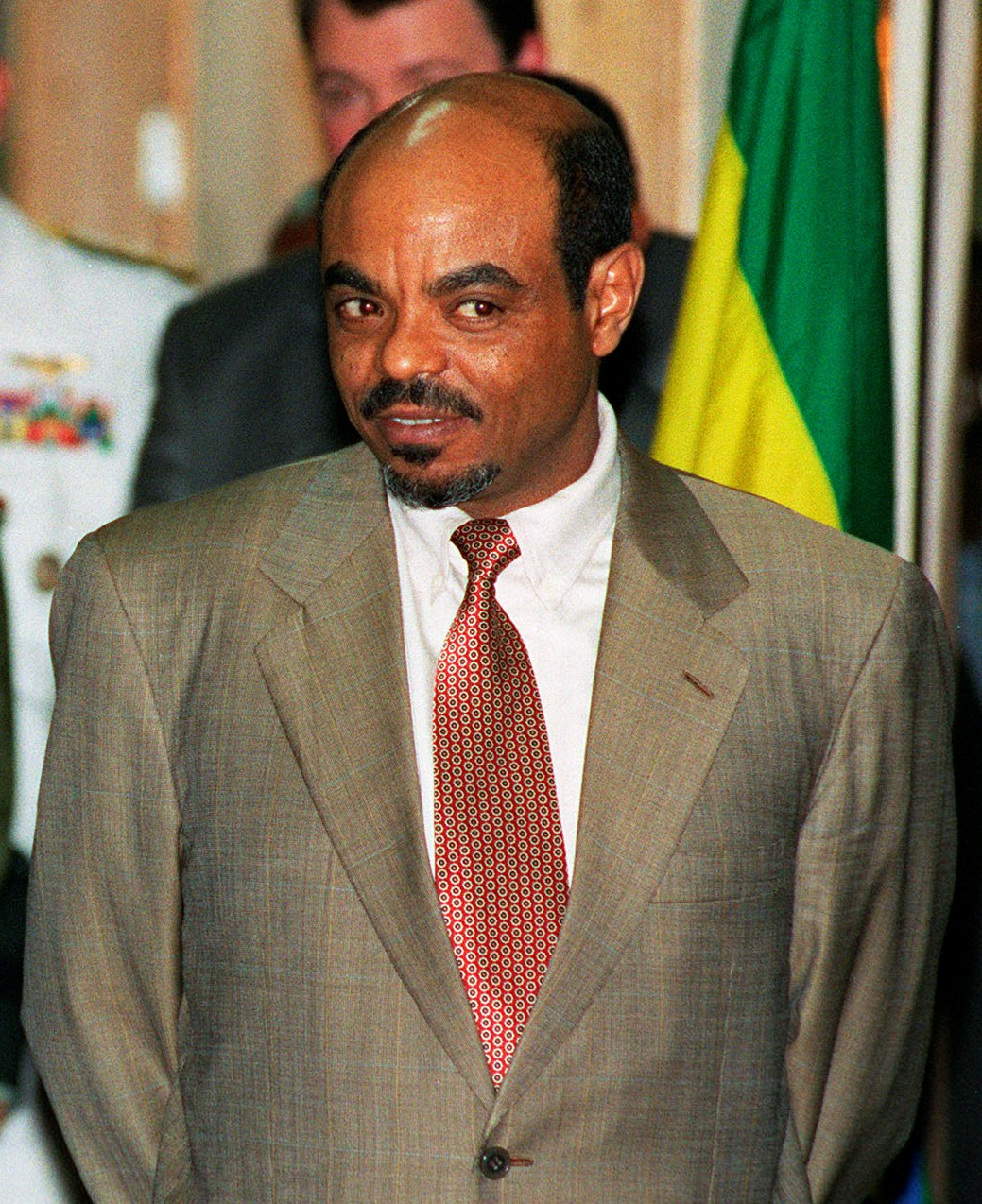
Meles in 2002 photographed by Helene C. Stikkel

In 2000 general election, Meles reelected as prime minister, with opposition parties like United Ethiopian Democratic Forces (UEDF) shared parliament seats. According to Ethiopian Human Rights Council, local UN staff, diplomatic missions, political parties, domestic non-governmental organizations, both general and regional elections were free and fair in most areas. However, there was misconduct in the Southern Nations, Nationalities, and People's Region, particularly in the Hadiya Zone.

==== School expansions ====
Ethiopia has expanded schools partially since 1990 without regional coverage. Meles rearranged school expanding scheme with million of Ethiopian birr; while his policy focussing around agricultural sector, the jobs in urban areas became declined, resulting in opposition from students and urban residents as well. In 1991, 27% of Ethiopian children attended school. The growth enrollment doubled to 77% and reached 85% in November 2006. As of 2005, there were 13,500 elementary schools and 550 secondary schools. Secondary schools were aided by satellite program called "School-Net".

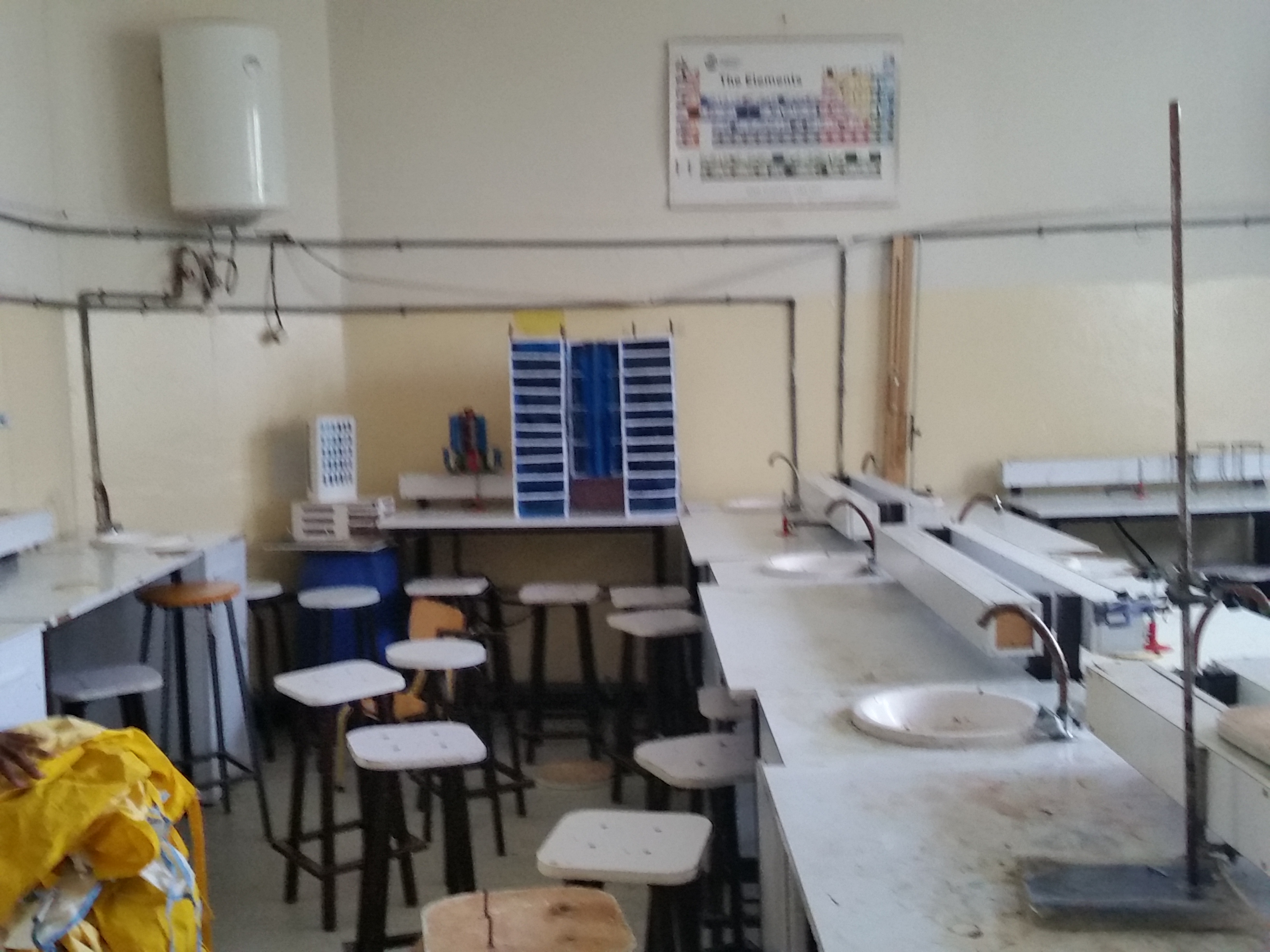
High school laboratory in Addis Ababa

Under his leadership, many universities and colleges unprecedentedly expanded and constructed. Those higher institutions include Adama University, Jimma University, Mekelle University, and newly built Debub University. Other are Awassa College and Bahir Dar University. It also implemented various departments and faculties. and the new Wolaita Soddo University started taking in students in February 2007.

==== Land and agriculture ====
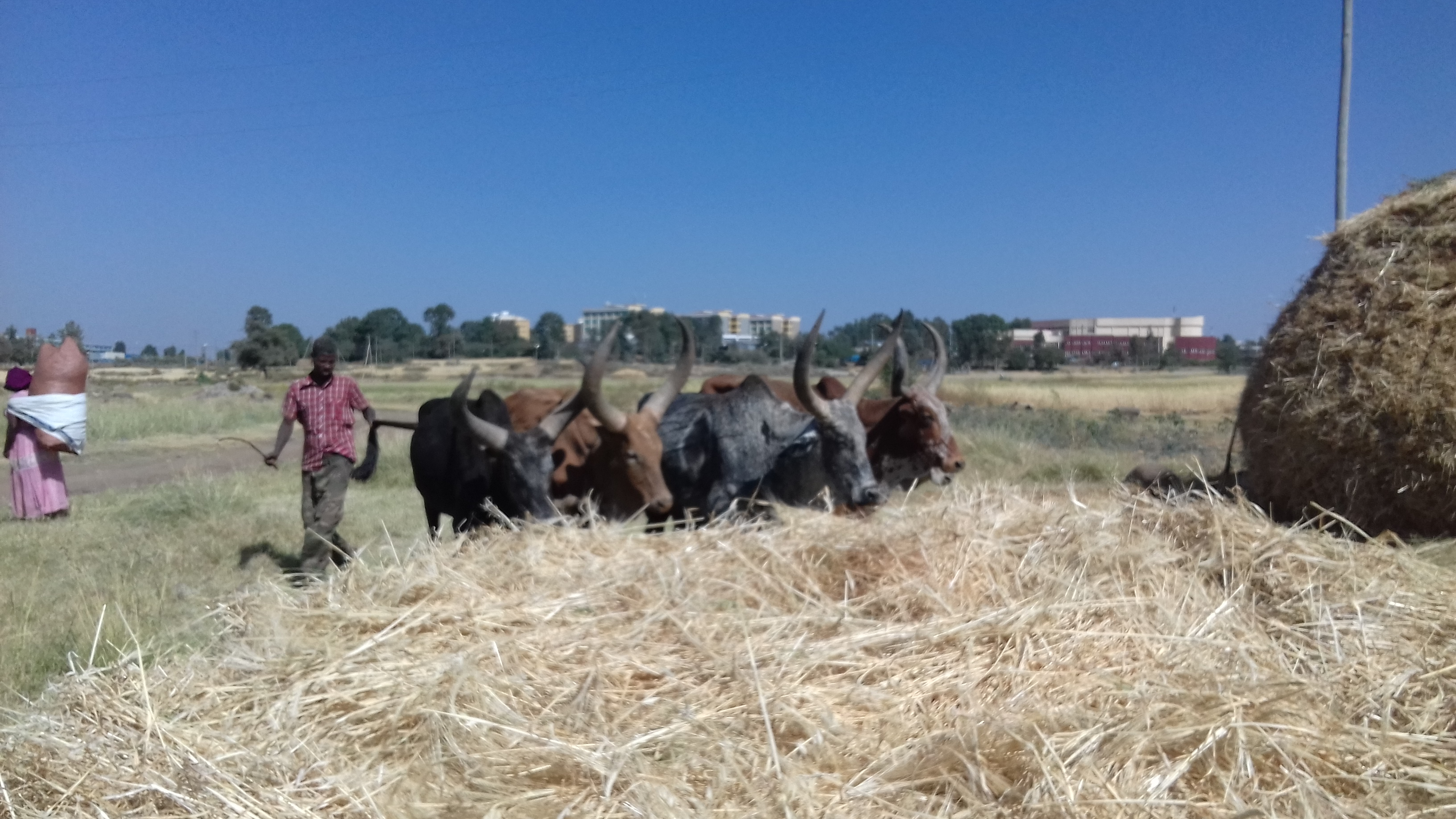
Oxen threshing in Tigray Region

Ethiopia frequently suffered from droughts throughout its history. Under his office, major droughts occurred in 1999/2000, 2002/2003 and 2009/2010.

Meles government encouraged collectivist land reforms and redistribution at local levels. However, the constitution deemed has shortcomings. Article 40, section 3 states that, "The right to own rural and urban land as well as natural resources belongs to only to the state and the people." The farmers use uncertain transfer rights whilst using lands. Since 2008, the government announced "empty" land leasing to foreign investors. This outlook considered by some holders "land grabbing" with a risk of losing their plots.

The EPRDF once convinced that land should not be privatized, farmers would pay their land after drought. His government believed privatization should be implemented potentially, but not presently.

=== Third term (2005–2010) ===
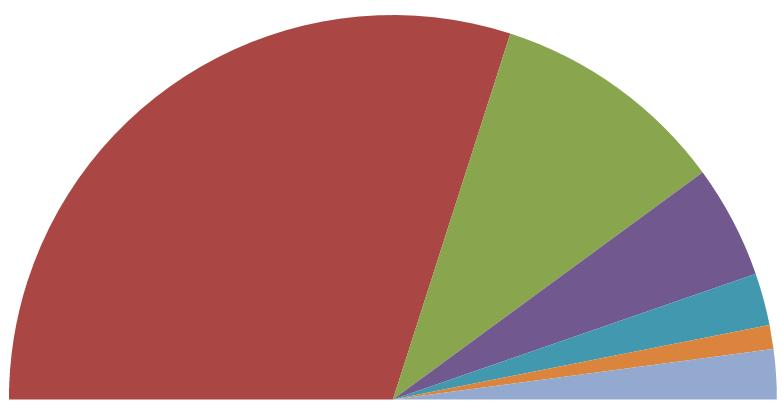
Ethiopian general election, 2005: parliament composition. Image only shows parties with more than 10 seats. The group "others" includes parties under 10 seats. Red : EPRDF Green : CUD Purple : UEDF Dark blue : SPDP Orange : OFDM Light blue : Others

The EPRDF faced an unprecedented challenge from opposition groups like the Coalition for Unity and Democracy (CUD), UEDF, and the Oromo Federalist Democratic Movement in the 2005 election. It was one of the most controversial elections in Ethiopian history, and the opposition accused the EPRDF of electoral fraud. Demonstrations broke out in Addis Ababa and protesters were massacred by government forces—763 people were killed and over 10,000 were imprisoned.

In spite of the 2005 Ethiopian general election violence, the Administrator of USAID recognized an EPRDF electoral victory and accused European Union election observers who were critical of the outcome of doing a "bad job" and of "favoring opposition groups".

=== Fourth term (2010–2012) ===
The TPLF administration strongly regards gender equality; Meles' wife and First Lady Azeb Mesfin was forefront advocator in women rights. Meles government encouraged all-encompassing women participations, organized forums to discuss backward issues in national television. Discussions include concerning tangential issues, HIV transmission, premature marriage, job opportunities and more. Various organizations emerged for example the Ethiopian Women Lawyers Association (EWLA), Kembatti Mentti Gezzima-tope and Network of Ethiopian Women's Associations.

==== 2012 journalist verbal attack ====
On 18 May 2012, Meles attended to Food Security 2012 G8 Summit in Washington D.C to discuss agricultural transformation in Africa to deal with unification of farmers and private sectors. Abebe Gelaw, a Washington-based Ethiopian journalist disrupted the conference by yelling at the podium against Meles with words:

Meles Zenawi is a dictator! Meles Zenawi is a dictator! Free Eskinder Nega! Free political prisoners! You are a dictator. You are committing crimes against humanity. Food is nothing without freedom! Meles has committed crimes against humanity! We need freedom! Freedom! Freedom!

Abebe was escorted by guards and detained. Abebe noted in his latest speech, "I voiced the anger, frustration and aspiration of the Ethiopian people in front of world leaders...Some are calling me a hero, others says I deserve honours. While I appreciate all the outpour of support, this is not about me. It is not about my heroism but the truth that must be told with utmost clarity. It is about our country, people, and the freedom and dignity we deserve."

=== Foreign affairs ===
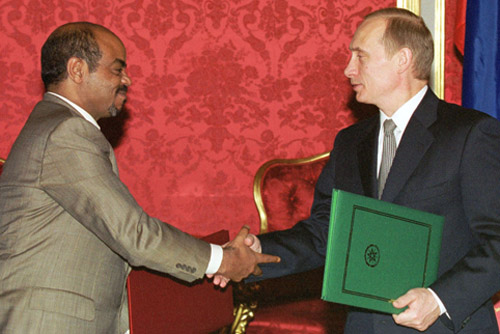
Meles with Russian President Vladimir Putin on 3 December 2001

Meles moved to have Ethiopia gain a larger share of the Nile River water. Part of this entailed using Ethiopia's hydropower prospects as leverage in exporting power to Egypt, amongst others. He had also aided the Sudan People's Liberation Army/Movement prior to independence of South Sudan as the rebels fought the government in Khartoum. Since the war on terrorism, Meles sought to consolidate hegemony of Ethiopia in East Africa, including his mediation efforts with Sudan and South Sudan, as well as stabilizing Somalia towards the end of the mandate of the Transitional Federal Government. Though he had controversially sent troops to fight against the Islamic Courts Union, he had been praised for working towards a stable situation along with the African Union since 2009.

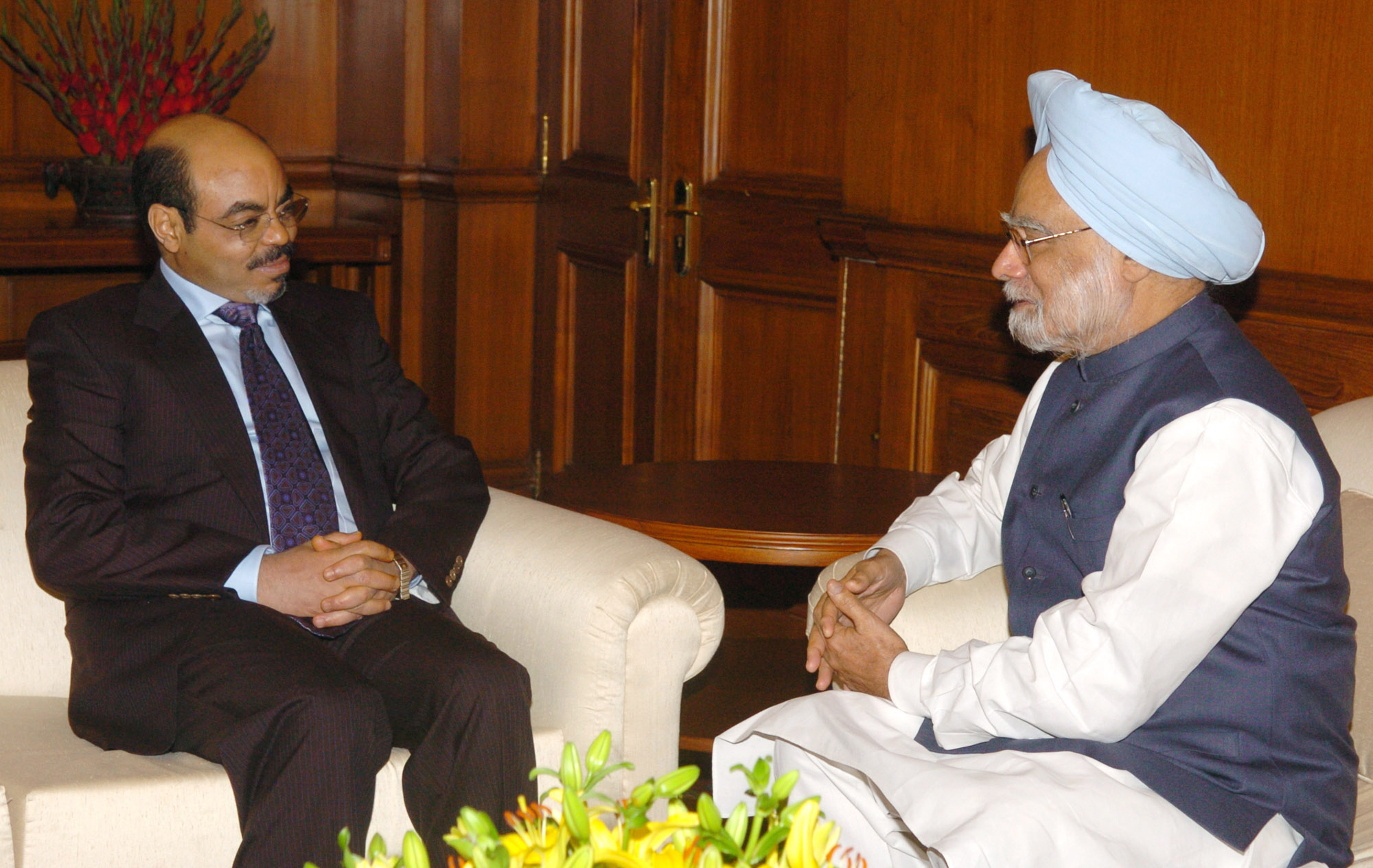
Meles with Indian prime minister Manmohan Singh in New Delhi on 6 November 2007

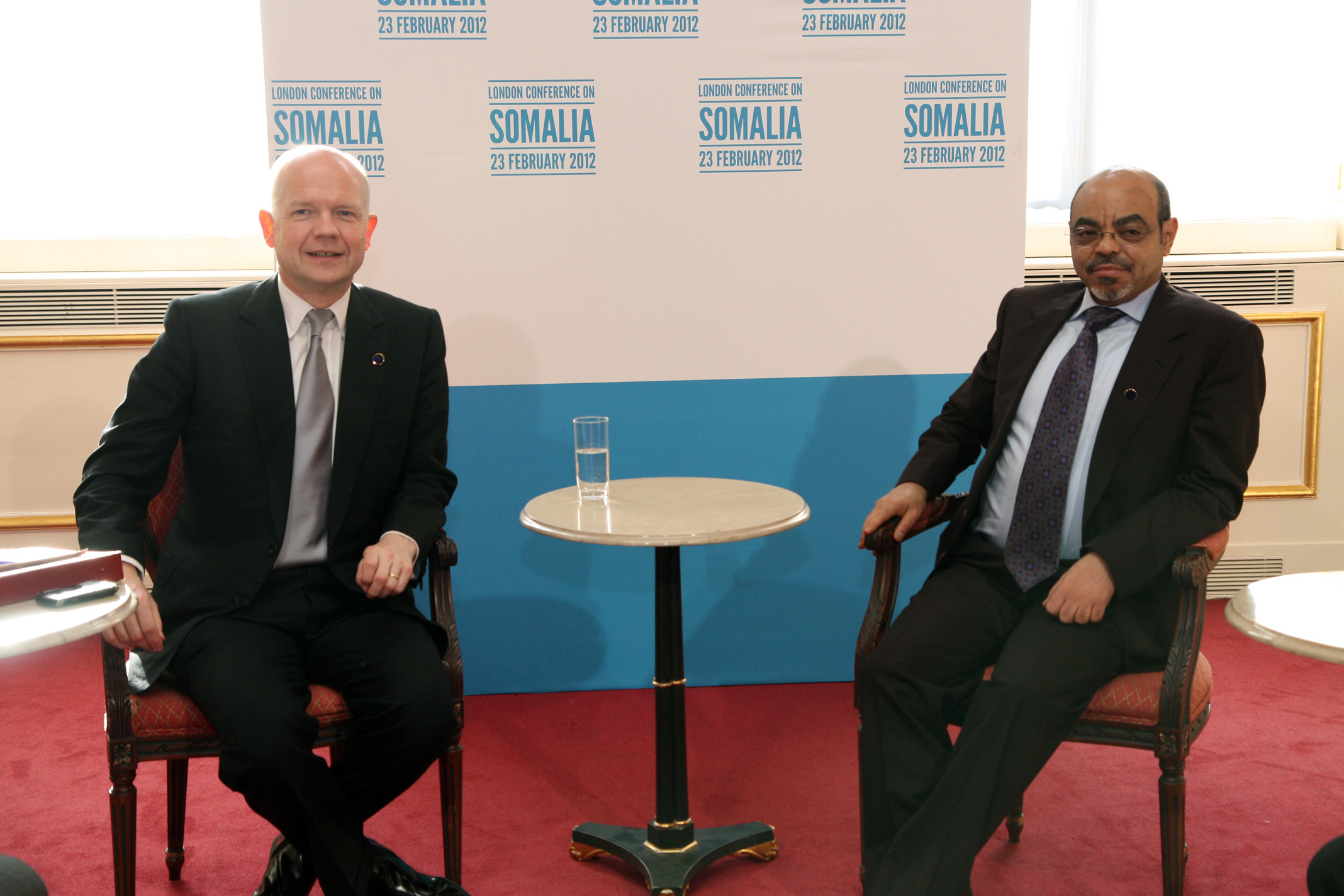
Meles with British Foreign Secretary William Hague on 23 February 2012

==== Eritrea ====
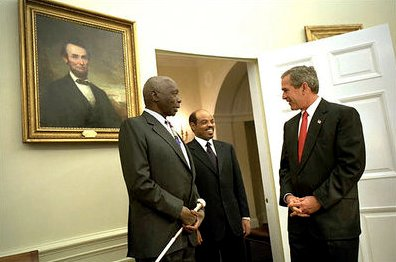
President George W. Bush welcomes President Daniel arap Moi of Kenya and Meles Zenawi to the Oval Office, December 2002

Meles Zenawi and President of Eritrea Isaias Afwerki were on good terms, as Eritrean forces helped TPLF overthrow the Derg. As the TPLF came to power in Ethiopia, it had occurred simultaneously with the EPLF's rise to power in Eritrea. After the 30 years of war between the two countries, the people of both countries enjoyed the fruit of peace, but not for long. In 1998, the Ethiopian government waged war with Eritrea on basis of border conflicts. The war comes to end in 2000. During the war, between 70,000 and 98,217 people were killed and 650,000 displaced. The Algiers Agreement was a peace agreement between the governments of Eritrea and Ethiopia signed on 12 December 2000, at Algiers, Algeria, which was supposed to be final and binding. Nevertheless, Meles Zenawi refused to pull back Ethiopian forces for Eritrean territory, leading to a no-war-no-peace situation in the region. Ethiopian forces reside in the sovereign lands of Eritrea, around the town Badme despite the EEBC Border ruling granting Badme to Eritrea. Eritreans feel Meles Zenawi and the TPLF have betrayed them and he is responsible for the loss of lives, relationships, and mutually benefiting opportunities of the two countries.

==== Somalia ====
Meles declared war on the ICU unprovoked in order to curry favor with the West. In 2006, the Islamic Courts Union assumed control of much of the southern part of Somalia and promptly imposed Shari'a law. The Transitional Federal Government sought to reestablish its authority, and, with the assistance of Ethiopian troops, African Union peacekeepers and air support by the United States, managed to drive out the rival ICU. On 8 January 2007, as the Battle of Ras Kamboni raged, TFG President and founder Abdullahi Yusuf Ahmed, a former colonel in the Somali Army, entered Mogadishu for the first time since being elected to office. The Somali government then relocated to Villa Somalia in the capital from its interim location in Baidoa. This marked the first time since the fall of the Siad Barre regime in 1991 that the federal government controlled most of the country.

In October 2011, a coordinated multinational operation began against Al-Shabaab in southern Somalia, with the Ethiopian military eventually joining the mission the following month. According to Ramtane Lamamra, the AU Commissioner for Peace and Security, the additional Ethiopian and AU troop reinforcements are expected to help the Somali authorities gradually expand their territorial control.

==== Climate change ====
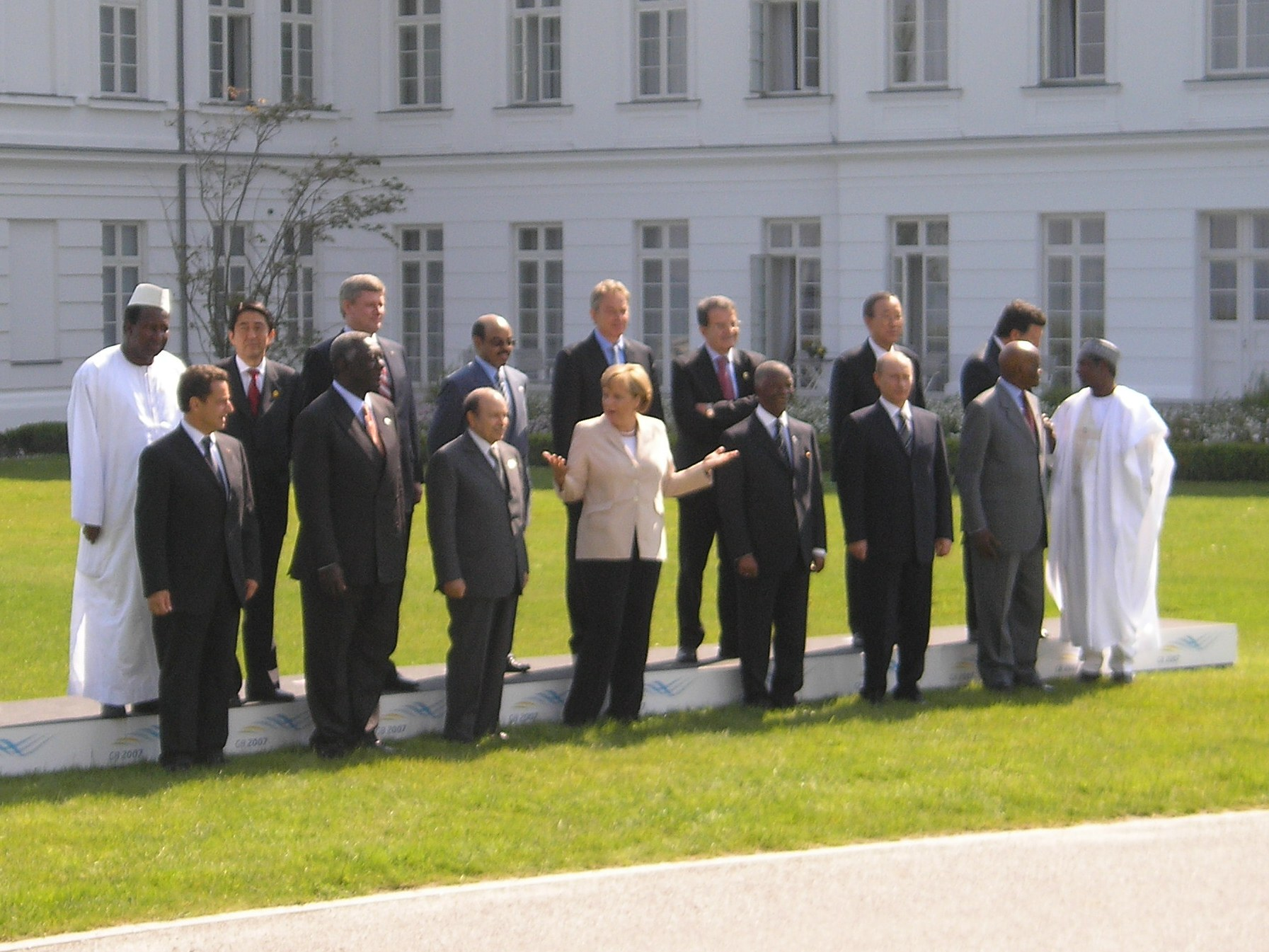
At the 33rd G8 summit in Heiligendamm in 2007 (Meles at elevated row fourth from left)

Meles played an important role in developing the African Union's position on climate change since 2009 and was a 'friend of the Chair' at the 15th Conference of the Parties (COP15) to the United Nations Framework Convention on Climate Change (UNFCCC).

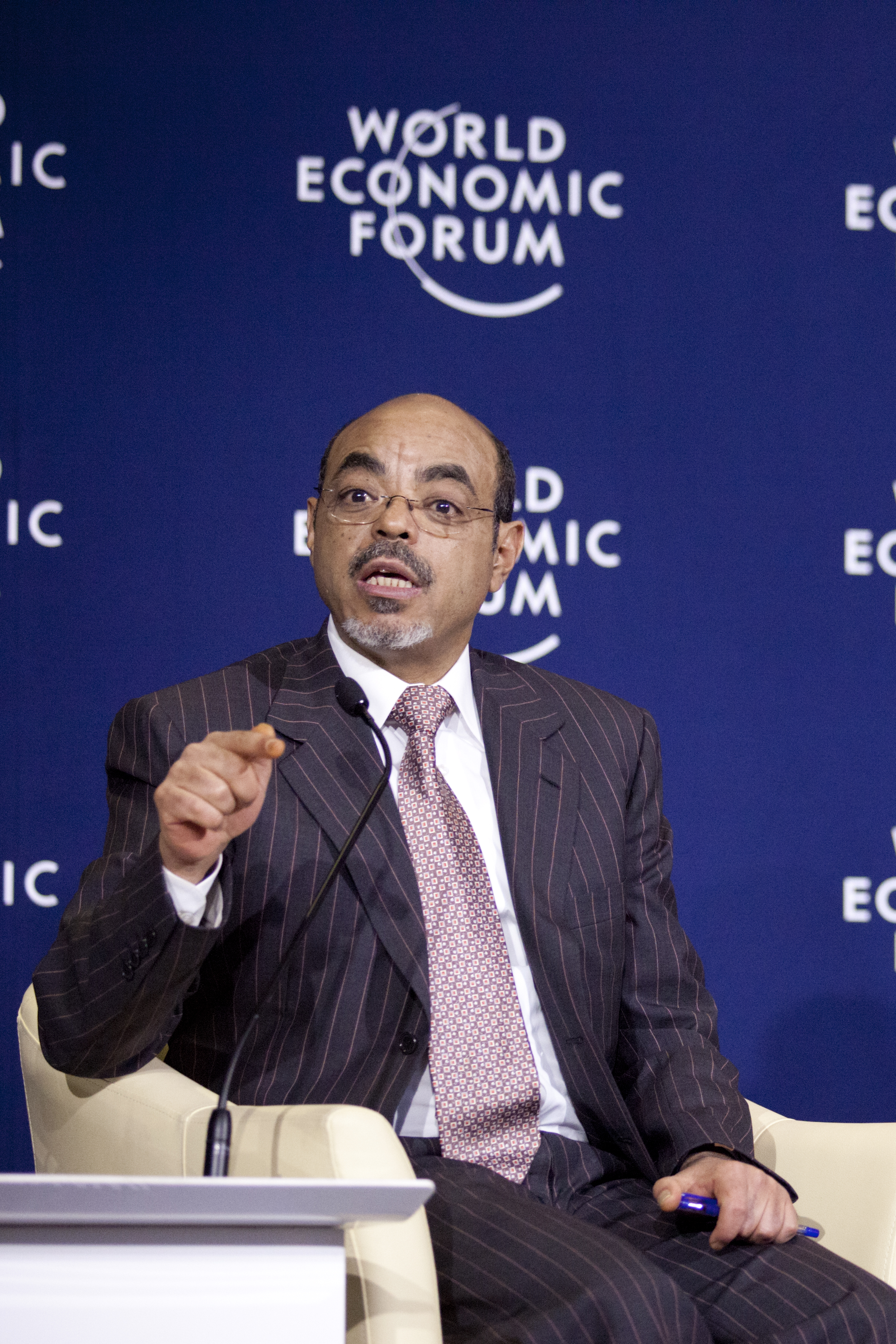
Meles Zenawi, a panelist at World Economic Forum on Africa 2012.

On 31 August 2009, Meles was appointed Chair of the African Heads of State and Government on Climate Change (CAHOSCC). The group had been established following 4 February 2009 decision at the 12th AU Assembly of Heads of States to build a common Africa position on climate change in preparations for COP15.

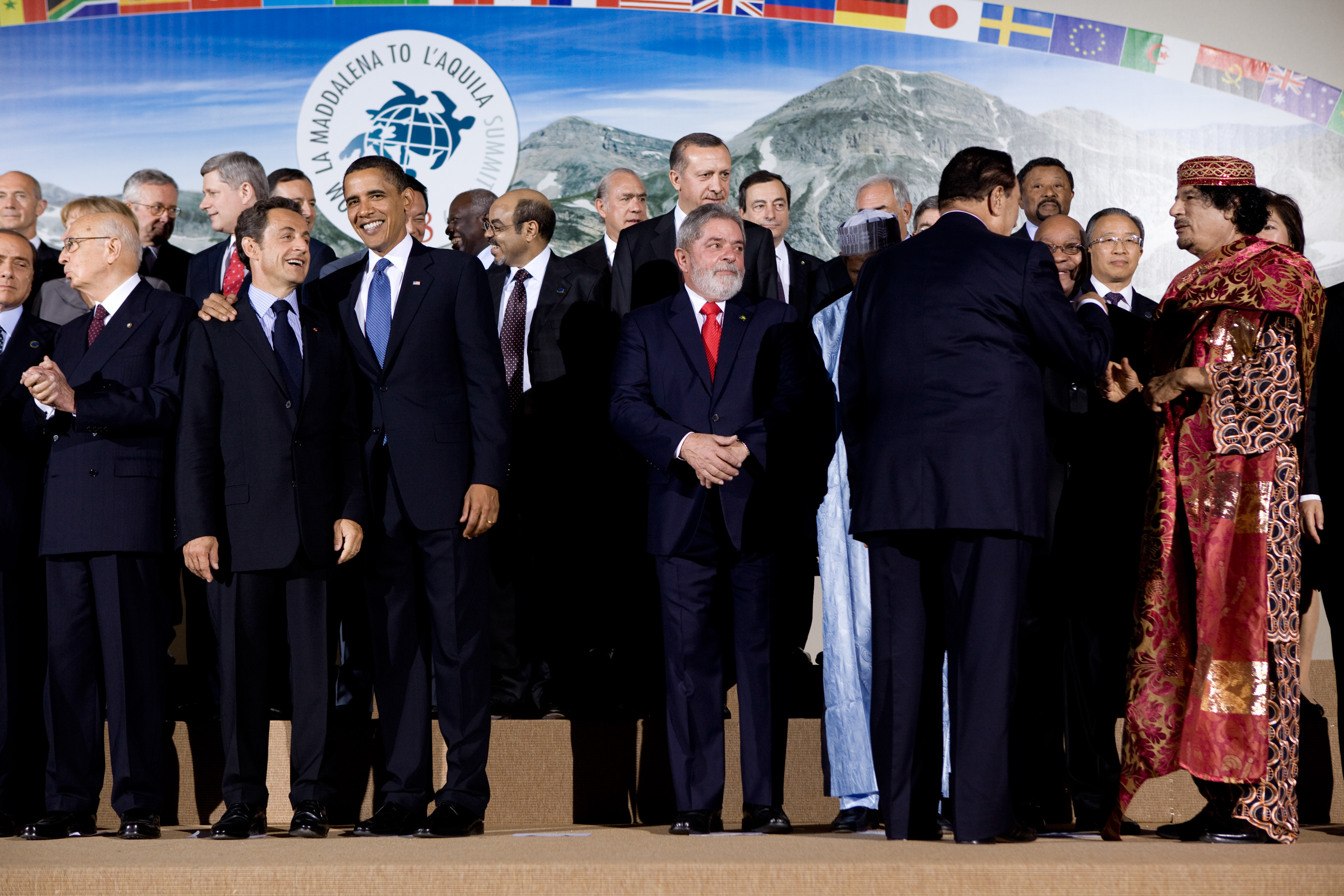
Meles attending the G-8 Summit in 2009

Prior to Meles' appointment, but in light of the AU's decision and the Algiers Declaration on the African Common Platform to Copenhagen, on 19 May 2009 the Africa Group made a submission to the UNFCCC that included demands for US$67 billion per year in finance for adaptation funding and US$200 billion per year for mitigation and set targets in terms of reductions of emissions by developed countries not by reference to temperature.

On 3 September 2009, Meles made a speech to the Africa Partnership Forum, where he said:

We will never accept any global deal that does not limit global warming to the minimum unavoidable level, no matter what levels of compensation and assistance are promised to us... While we will reason with everyone to achieve our objective, we will not rubber-stamp an agreement by the powers that be as the best we could get for the moment. We will use our numbers to delegitimize any agreement that is not consistent with our minimal position. If needs be we are prepared to walk out of any negotiations that threaten to be another rape of our continent.

== Illness and death ==
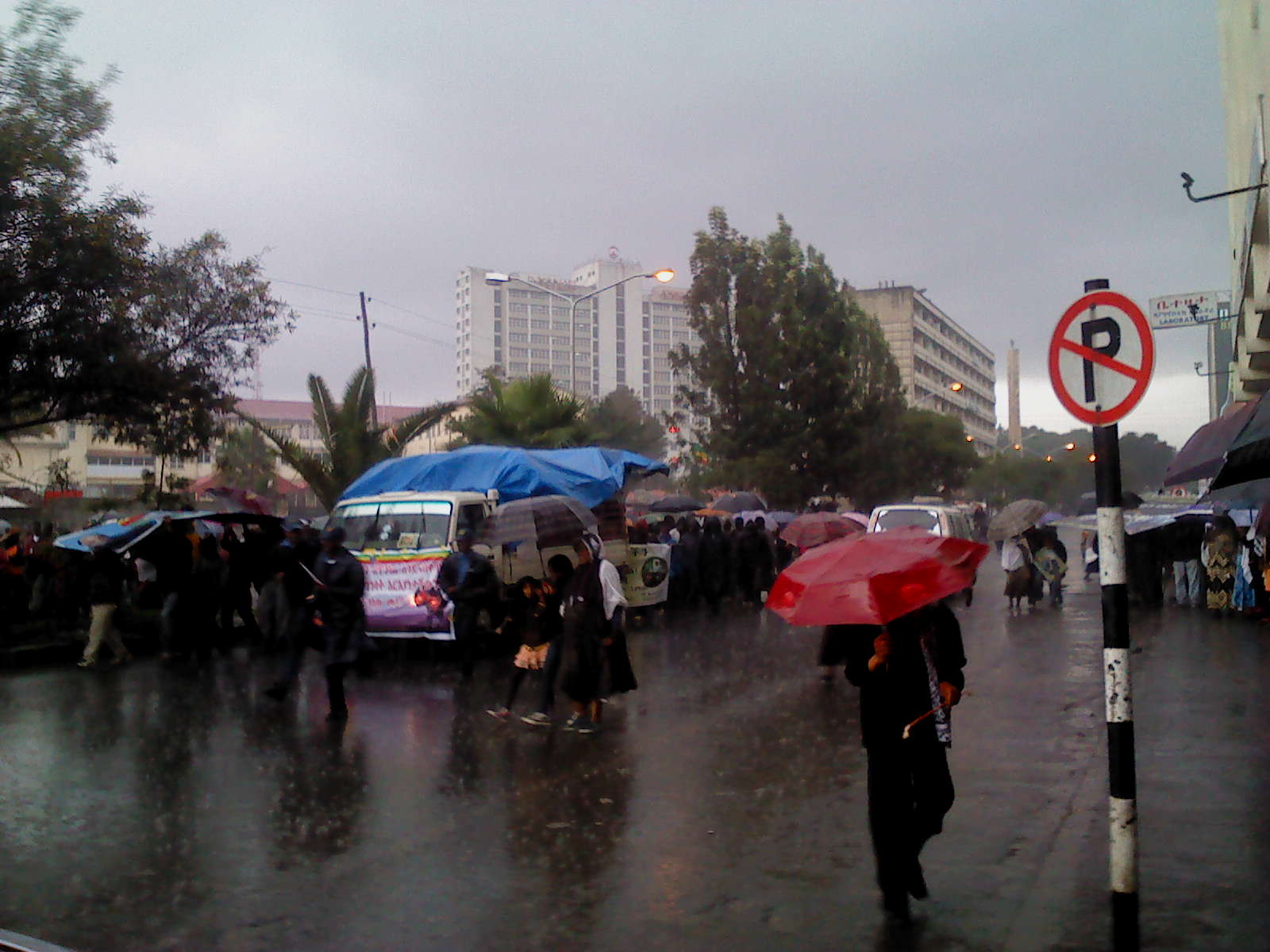
State funeral of Meles Zenawi procession in Addis Ababa street

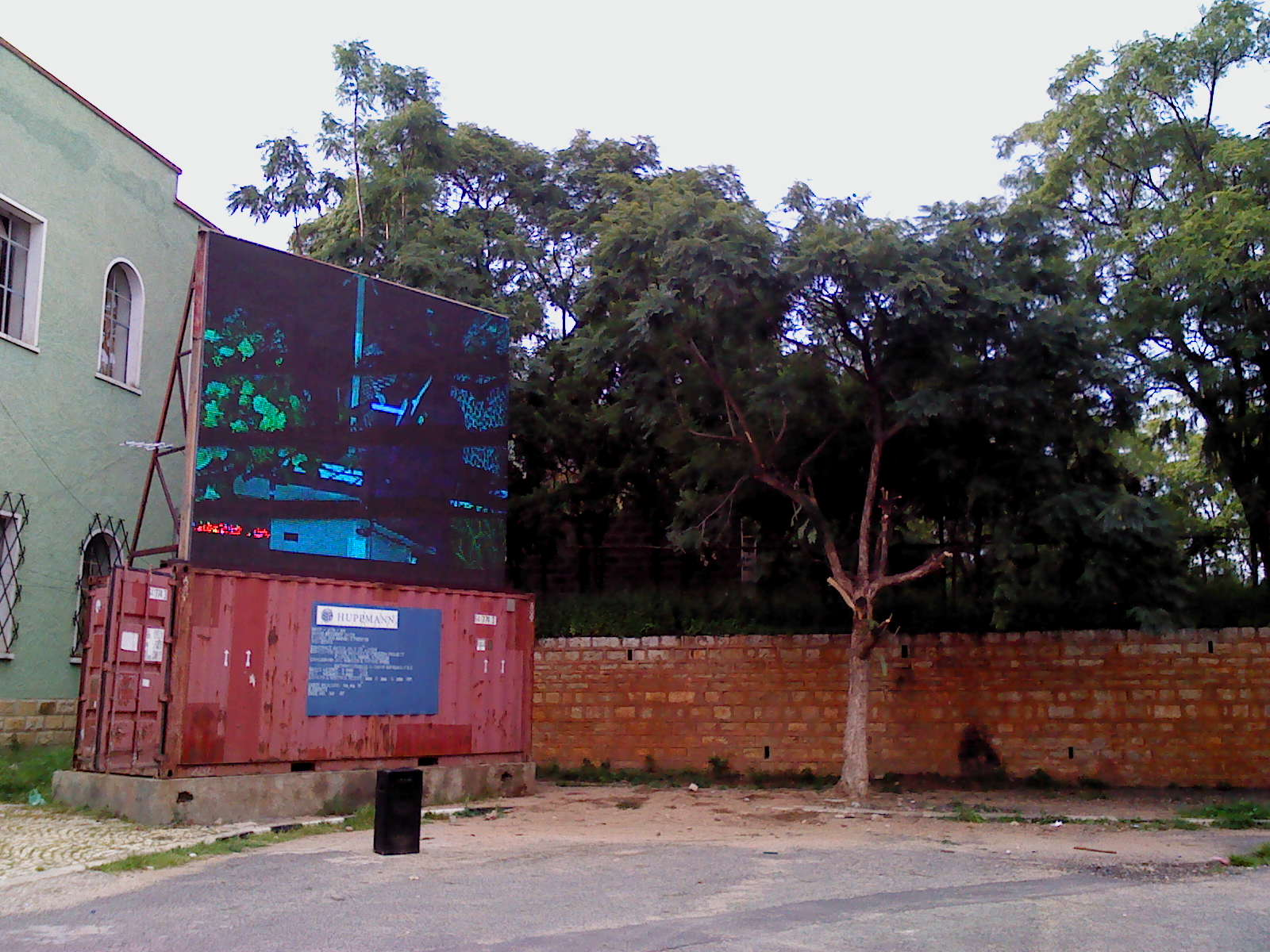
Live broadcast of the funeral in Harar via public space television

In July 2012, questions arose concerning Meles' health when he did not attend African Union summit meetings in Addis Ababa. Opposition groups claimed that Meles may have already died on 16 July while undergoing treatment in Belgium; however, Deputy Prime Minister Hailemariam Desalegn attributed Meles' absence to a minor illness. A press conference, during which the government planned to clarify Meles' health status, was scheduled for 18 July but postponed until later in the week. While the government acknowledged that Meles had been hospitalised, it stated that his condition was not serious. There were further rumours of his death when he was not seen in public after the 2012 G20 summit and at the time of the death of the head of the Ethiopian Orthodox Church, Abune Paulos.

On 20 August, Meles Zenawi died after contracting an infection in Belgium.

Minister of Information Bereket Simon announced on state television:

It's a sad day for Ethiopia. The man who led our country for the past 21 years and brought economic and democratic changes, has died. We have lost our respected leader. Meles has been receiving treatment abroad. He was getting better and we were expecting him to return to Addis Ababa. But he developed a sudden infection and died around 11:40pm last night. His body will be returned to Ethiopia soon. We have set up a committee to organise his funeral. More information will be released about that soon. As per Ethiopian law, Hailemariam Desalegn has now taken over the leadership. He will also be in charge of the Ethiopian military and all other government institutions. I would like to stress, nothing in Ethiopia will change. The government will continue. Our policies and institutions will continue. Nothing will change in Ethiopia. Desalegn will be confirmed by parliament.

After his body was repatriated two days later, thousands of mourners congregated on streets from the airport to Meles' former residence to pay their last respects as his coffin, draped in the flag of Ethiopia, was accompanied by a military band. The event was attended by political, military, and religious leaders, as well as diplomats and his wife, Azeb Mesfin. The body lie in state. A declaration of national mourning was also issued. There were also fears of a power vacuum after his death, as well as a possible detriment to Eritrea-Ethiopian relations.

Meles's funeral took place in Addis Ababa on 2 September 2012 in a religious ceremony attended by at least 20 African presidents and thousands of Ethiopians gathered in Meskel Square.

=== Reactions ===
Political leaders, states, and institutions offered their thoughts on Meles following his death.

- Olympic gold medalist and Ethiopian national Haile Gebrselassie praised Meles' achievements.
- Contemporary United Nations Secretary-General Ban Ki-moon praised Meles' "exceptional leadership".
- Israel Prime Minister Benjamin Netanyahu's office issued a statement that read: "[Netanyahu] presented his condolences to the Ethiopian people. Meles was loved in his country. He was also a true friend of Israel. During his mandate, Ethiopia became one of Israel's closest friends."
- United Kingdom Prime Minister David Cameron called Meles "an inspirational spokesman for Africa."
- United States President Barack Obama released the statement: "It was with sadness that I learned of the passing of Prime Minister Meles Zenawi of Ethiopia. Prime Minister Meles deserves recognition for his lifelong contribution to Ethiopia's development, particularly his unyielding commitment to Ethiopia's poor. I met with Prime Minister Meles at the G-8 Summit in May and recall my personal admiration for his desire to lift millions of Ethiopians out of poverty through his drive for food security. I am also grateful for Prime Minister Meles's service for peace and security in Africa, his contributions to the African Union, and his voice for Africa on the world stage. On behalf of the American people, I offer my condolences to Prime Minister Meles' family and to the people of Ethiopia on this untimely loss and confirm the U.S. Government's commitment to our partnership with Ethiopia. Going forward, we encourage the Government of Ethiopia to enhance its support for development, democracy, regional stability and security, human rights, and prosperity for its people."
- South Korean President Lee Myung-bak released this statement: "The passing of Prime Minister Meles is being mourned across the globe. We all have just lost a great leader of Ethiopia and a preeminent advocate for Africa and the developing world. [...] I pray for the repose of a truly bright mind who lived an intense and moving life – my close friend."

Western NGOs Amnesty International called for the new administration to end Meles' "ever-increasing repression" and Human Rights Watch similarly added that the next administration should repeal the 2009 anti-terrorism law. As The New York Times asked about a gap between the United States of America's strategic and ideological goals in relation to its support for Meles' government, it quoted HRW researcher Leslie Lefkow as saying: "There is an opportunity here. If donors are shrewd, they will use the opportunity that this presents to push a much stronger and bolder human rights stance and need for reform." Author Dan Connell, who had interviewed Meles in June, said that "he seemed focused [then] on wrapping up a number of major projects as if he were aware the end was near. Meles knew his days were numbered." The Committee to Protect Journalists cited and criticised the secrecy around Meles' death. The Washington Post said that the "circumstances of his death remained laced with intrigue".

Regional groups responded with the Ogaden National Liberation Front saying it hoped his death "may usher [in] a new era of stability and peace" and Al Shabaab that it was celebrating the "uplifting news".

== Personal life ==
Meles acquired an MBA from the Open University of the United Kingdom in 1995 and an MSc degree in Economics from the Erasmus University Rotterdam of the Netherlands in 2004. In July 2002, he received an honorary doctoral degree in political science from the Hannam University in South Korea. Meles was married to Azeb Mesfin, a former rebel fighter in the TPLF and, as of 2013, a Member of Parliament. Meles was the father of three children; Semhal, Marda and Senay Meles.

== Legacy ==
=== Economic prosperity of Ethiopia ===
During Prime Minister Meles Zenawi's rule, Ethiopia prospered economically (with double-digit economic growth for his last 9 years). The high economic growth is continuing 7 years after his death, since his party Tigray People's Liberation Front and EPRDF continued to work with the same policies. Ethiopia even became the fastest-growing economy in Africa.

=== Titles, awards and honors ===
Prime Minister Meles received various international awards for setting up a good foundation for the development of Ethiopia. Even though Ethiopia remains one of the poorest countries in the world, the near double-digit annual economic growth rate recently is seen as the beginning of Ethiopia's long marathon struggle to eliminate poverty. Acknowledging the rapid GDP growth of the country, the UK newspaper The Economist said in December 2007 that "Ethiopia's economy has been growing at record speed in recent years." In 2008, the International Monetary Fund (IMF) described the speed of Ethiopia's economic growth in recent years as the "fastest for a non-oil exporting country in Sub-Saharan Africa", with Ethiopia ranked as the second-most attractive African country for investors.

- Prime Minister Meles was awarded the Haile Selassie I Prize Trust, a highly selective award given only to the most outstanding graduating students.
- The Rwanda government awarded Meles Rwanda's National Liberation Medal, the "Uruti," in July 2009 for helping to liberate Rwanda and end the genocide in the country. Alongside two other African leaders, Meles was also given Rwanda's highest accolade, the "Umurinzi" medal, Rwanda's Campaign Against Genocide Medal.
- PM Meles Zenawi was allegedly awarded the World Peace Prize for his contributions to global peace and his effort to stabilize the Horn of Africa through cooperation with Inter-Governmental Authority for Development (IGAD). However, the World Peace Council strongly denied that they have awarded this prize to Meles Zenawi: saying " WPC press bureau wishes to declare that no such award was given by our organization in the past or will be given"
- Tabor 100, an African American entrepreneur's organization, honored PM Meles for his contribution toward economic and social transformation in Africa with its prestigious Crystal Eagle International Leadership Award in April 2005. Tabor 100, a U.S.-based nongovernmental organization, calling Meles Zenawi "international leader of the year 2005", also honored the efforts of the Ethiopian government in general for its war on poverty and backwardness.
- PM Meles was awarded the Good Governance Award of the Global Coalition for Africa for leading Ethiopia along a democratic path during the challenging period of transition. He was selected for the good governance award by the US-based Corporate Council on Africa.
- PM Meles received the Norway-based 2005 Yara Prize for Green Revolution for initiating a good foundation for economic progress in Ethiopia, particularly in the agricultural sector, where the poor country has doubled its food production. During the award ceremony held in the Norwegian capital of Oslo on 3 September, the director of the UN project for Africa said, "With our support, Ethiopia can lift itself from poverty and hunger. Under Prime Minister Meles the country has created the grassroots structure to enable this to happen."
- Meles was given the Africa Political Leadership Award of 2008 by the US-based newspaper, Africa Times. Previous winners of the award include Desmond Tutu, Nelson Mandela and others.
- Ethiopia's military honored Prime Minister Meles for his leadership during the 1998–2000 war with its northern neighbour when Eritrea invaded Ethiopia in 1998.
- Residents of the historic and ancient UNESCO town of Axum in Ethiopia honored Prime Minister Meles for his political and diplomatic leadership role in the return and re-erection of the Obelisk of Axum after a 68-year stay in Rome, Italy.
- Meles received a Gold Order of Merit award from the Confederation of African Football (CAF) in February 2007. PM Meles was given the CAF organisation's highest award for his services in advancing the progress of African football. Ethiopia was one of the founding countries of the CAF (1957) and the organization, with the dedication of AU leaders like Meles, was celebrating the International Year of African Football in 2007.

=== Positions ===
- Meles was a co-chairperson of the Global Coalition for Africa (GCA.) The Global Coalition for Africa brings together senior African policy makers and their partners to deepen dialogue and build consensus on Africa's priority development issues.
- Prime Minister Meles served as the Chairman of the Organization of African Unity (OAU, now the African Union – AU) from June 1995 to June 1996.
- In 2007, the African Union elected Meles to chair the executive committee of the NEPAD (the New Partnership for Africa's Development)
- Meles was chosen to represent Africa at the G8 Summit and the G20 summit in London.
- In February 2010, the UN named Ethiopian Prime Minister Meles as co-chair of the Advisory Group on Climate Change Financing, a new high-level U.N. advisory group on climate change financing.

=== Milestones ===
Several social, economic, religious, and political developments and systems were established for the first time in Ethiopia under Meles' rule.

- First regional referendum for peaceful Secession (Eritrea, 1991–)
- First Multi-party National election for opposition (2000, 2005, 2010)
- First institutionalized linguistic freedom at the local level (1994–)
- First ethnic-based federalism (since 1994)
- First private media outlets in Ethiopian history (since 1994)
- First consecutive double-digit GDP growth – International Monetary Fund (since 2006)
- First multi-party parliament with opposition MPs (since 2000)
- First unrestricted freedom of religion for evangelicals/Pentecostals (since 1994; a Pentecostal succeeded him in 2012)

=== Foundation ===
Meles was given the Green Revolution award and a financial prize of 200,000 dollars by the Norwegian Yara Foundation in September 2005 "in recognition of past accomplishments and encouragement to achieve economic development for the people of Ethiopia."

Meles donated his $200,000 financial award to a foundation called "Fre—Addis Ethiopia Women Fund" (Fre-Addis Ethiopia Yesetoch Merja Mahiber). The Fre-Addis Ethiopia Women Fund has an objective "to empower girls through providing educational opportunities" and it currently supports 514 needy and orphan rural girls to pursue their education throughout the country.

On 6 April 2013, the Meles Zenawi Foundation was established to honor his legacy. It was inaugurated at 7th congress of African Union in Addis Ababa.

== Criticism ==
Meles Zenawi's tenure has been described by many human rights groups, political analysts, dissents and media as authoritarian marked by perpetual personality cult, suppressing civil liberties, initiating nationwide crackdowns and repression, jailing political opponents and fueling ethnic clashes. While his leadership garnered considerable plaudit by some African leaders and the Western countries primarily for economic achievements, he was also attracted to criticism for human rights violations. Most notably, Alex de Waal wrote in his 2013 book The Theory and Practice of Meles Zenawi that Meles was a convinced Marxist-Leninist with pragmatic approach who disdained liberal democracy in favor of abusing power. He noted "Along with his comrades in arms in the leadership of the Tigray People's Liberation Front (TPLF), he had looked into the abyss of collective destruction, and his career was coloured by the knowledge that Ethiopia could still go over that precipice."

Political academic and author Awol Allo described him as a paradoxical figure embodying a "brutal dictator and a politico-economic genius, both unified in one". Furthermore, Meles is regarded as the culprit of post-Derg Ethiopia’s continuing ethnically motivated violence and tensions. While leading as autocrats, the TPLF government orchestrated ethnic marginalization of Oromo and Amhara people in order to consolidate power. According to some Ethiopian nationalists, he is a polarizing figure in modern history who granted autonomy for all ethnicities in Ethiopia, thereby risking the development of the Ethiopian state.

== Bibliography ==
- The Eritrean Struggle: From Where to Where? (1980)
- African Development: Dead Ends and New Beginnings (2006)
- Agricultural Development-Led Industrialisation (ADLI) strategy

== Media appearances ==
- Motherland (Film 2010)
- Teachers TV (Interview)
- Al Jazeera (Interview)

== See also ==
- Ethiopian Orthodox
- Azeb Mesfin
- Girma Wolde-Giorgis
- Haile Selassie
- Yohannes III
- Tokyo International Conference on African Development (TICAD-IV), 2008.
- Blanco Chivite, Manuel. Diario de Etiopía, Madrid, Vosa Ediciones, 1992

== Quotations ==
- "They don't want to see a developed Africa. They want us to remain backward to serve their tourists as a museum" - in response to critics of the hydro dam and other development projects
- "I regret the deaths but these were not normal demonstrations. You don't see hand grenades thrown at normal demonstrations"—on a post-election issue
- "Africa's downfall has always been the cult of the personality. And their names always seem to begin with M. We've had Mobutu and Mengistu and I'm not going to add Meles to the list."—Dimbleby questioning Meles on his exposure to the people.
- "We have taken measures and beefed up our defense capabilities around the border since December to prevent any miscalculation by the other side," post-Eritrean-Ethiopian war complications
- "..countries pretend their foreign policy is based on democratisation when this is clearly not the case. For all the challenges in Zimbabwe, for example, it is a bit of a stretch to say it is less democratic than some of the sheikhdoms of the Gulf. But none of the sheikdoms has a problem visiting Europe."- Meles Zenawi's response about European sanctions and travel ban on Zimbabwe's Mugabe
- "If it is presumed that the Kenyans will democratise in order to eat the peanuts of development assistance from the European Union... it would be a big mistake"- Meles Zenawi's reaction to European threat of sanctions on Kenya.
- "Democracy is the expression of a sovereign people. To impose it from outside is inherently undemocratic."- Meles interviewed by The Guardian
- "It's true we have our disagreements on border issues, we have disagreements on trade and related issues, but you don't go invading a country whenever you have a dispute on trade issues, ... We have more civilized mechanisms on resolving such problems." – after Eritrea's attack on Mekele, Ethiopia
- "America didn't give us any money because of Somalia intervention. This doesn't mean America hasn't given us food aid or money for HIV prevention before. It certainly has. But we aren't going to fight Somalia using Condoms." – Meles's reply to MP Bulcha Demeksa's teasing question on whether America gave financial support to Ethiopia for the Somalia intervention.
- "This is not your run-of-the-mill demonstration. This is an Orange Revolution gone wrong" – PM Meles accusing opposition parties of the violence.
- "I have never heard of any convincing reason as to why we should privatize land at this stage." Part of PM Meles' controversial reply to Dr. Abdul Mejid Hussien.
- "The violence has marred the image of Ethiopia,... The worst is clearly behind us and we do not expect any such violence in the near future."—on post-election events
- "Even when we obey international laws after exhausting all peaceful means, some countries might not support our move to defend Ethiopia because of their own national interests or diplomatic rationale. So what do we do? Two choices: either we seat & welcome our enemies to invade our homes or we stand up for ourselves. I hope parliament chooses the second option...we don't need the blessing of other nations to defend our country."—Meles speaking to parliament about Somali Islamic courts. (from amharic translation)
- "I am proud to be an Ethiopian. I am proud to be a part of that history."—Meles speaking to American intellectuals about Ethiopia and its history.
- "When they (Somali Jihadists) control the whole of Somalia it would be very naive to assume that they will mend their ways, cease to be terrorists and become very civilized and very tame pussycats."—Interview with AP on Somali extremists.
- "As we respond to the assault of our enemy and defend our country, we must never break international laws. Crime can not be solved by more crime." – Meles Zenawi speaking to Parliament 23 November 2006.
- ""We believe the problem between ourselves and Eritrea will have to be resolved through dialogue, but it takes two to tango"—on border dispute with Eritrea". Sudan Tribune. Archived from the original on 19 March 2005.
- "The rest of the contextual factors have no relevance whatsoever to the investigative process. Indeed, they remind me of the famous Tina Turner song. 'What's love got to do with it?'"—Meles Zenawi's response to EU-EOM implying Mrs. Ana Gomez's alleged contradicting accusations.
- "So why don't you give them additional concessions?' We said, 'What concessions? Concessions from our sovereignty? That has never been done by any government in Ethiopia in 3,000 years.' That is the only thing of great value what we have inherited from our past, our unflinching determination to keep our...country independent even if we are dying of hunger."—Response to EU's demands for Eritrea
- "While they are entitled to their own opinion, this government and this country are incapable, unwilling, and unable to be run like some banana republic from Capitol Hill. It is very worrisome that some of these individuals appear to have entertained such views."—In response to Rep. Donald Payne's pressure for Hailu Shawel & Co.

Political offices
Preceded by Tesfaye Gebre Kidan; Acting	President of Ethiopia; 1991–1995	Succeeded by Negasso Gidada
Preceded by Tamirat Layne; Acting	Prime Minister of Ethiopia; 1995–2012	Succeeded by Hailemariam Desalegn
