= Temsalet =

Book by Ethiopian women

First edition

Temsalet is a book published by the Network of Ethiopian Women's Associations featuring the stories and photographs of 64 accomplished Ethiopian women. Its publication on October 7, 2014 was accompanied by a week-long exhibition, "Faces of Temsalet", featuring photographs by Ethiopian photographer Aïda Muluneh, whose portraits of the women accompany each story in the book.
