= Premiership of Meles Zenawi =

Administration of Ethiopian Prime Minister Meles Zenawi

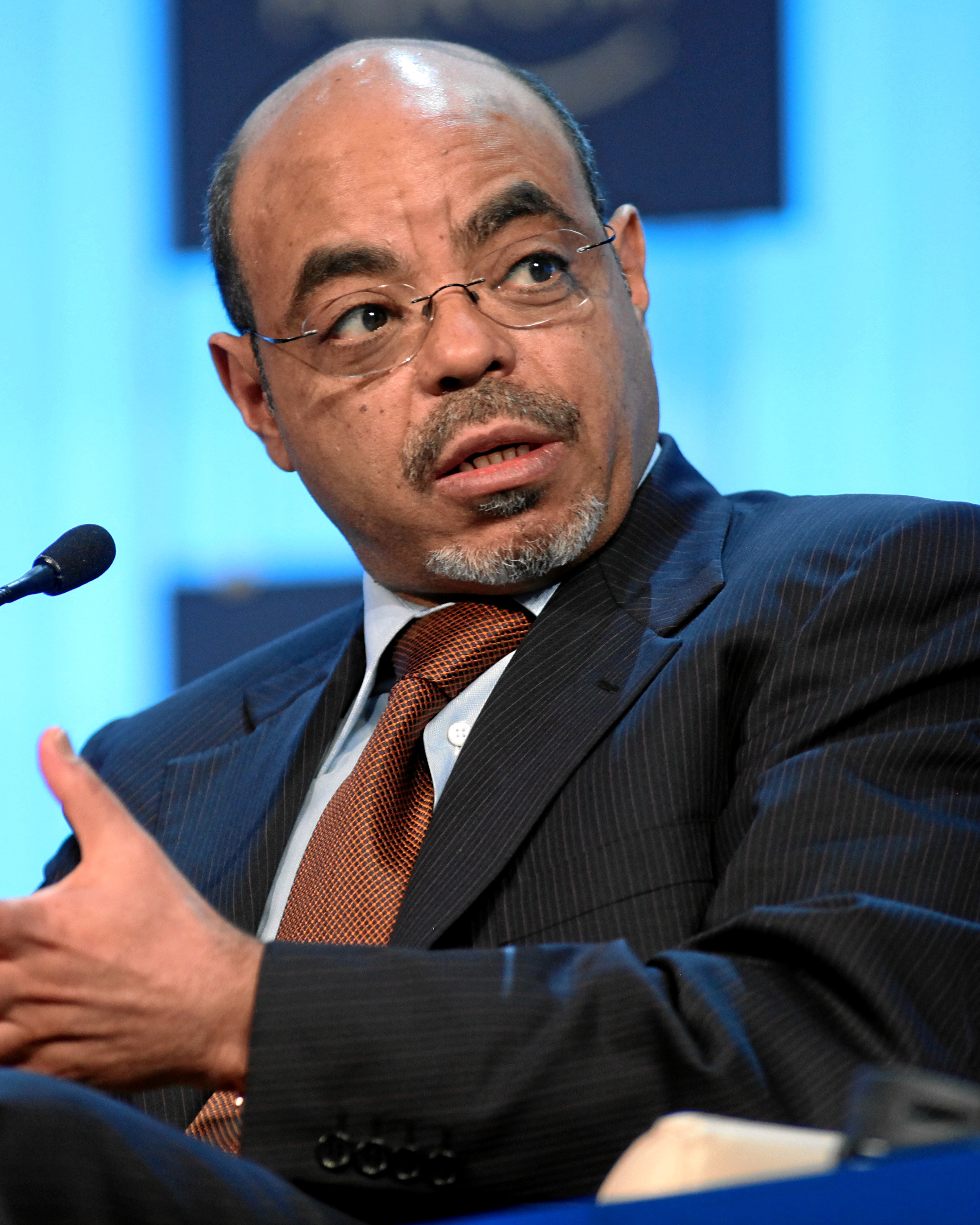
Meles Zenawi in 2012

The premiership of Meles Zenawi began in August 1995 following the 1995 Ethiopian general election and ended upon his death on 20 August 2012. Whilst serving as Prime Minister of Ethiopia, Meles Zenawi concurrently served as the Leader of the Tigray People's Liberation Front (TPLF) and Ethiopian People's Revolutionary Democratic Front (EPRDF).

== First term (1995-2000) ==
=== Economic restructuring ===
Following the Ethiopian Civil War, 1983-1985 famine, and the Marxist policies of the prior governments (Derg and the People's Democratic Republic of Ethiopia) the Ethiopian economy was in shambles. Privatisation of government companies, end of communal farms, land law reforms, and foreign investment laws were all implemented.

=== Ethnic federalism ===
The Meles government created an ethnic-based federalism, which came under attack by some Ethiopians. Meles' TPLF party believed that there was no choice—this was the only solution to the centuries-old oppression by centralist governments, and to domination of culture, language, politics and economy by one ethnic group, namely the Amhara. On the other hand, some parties like the OLF (Oromo Liberation Front), which was a partner in drafting the constitution, see Amhara and Tigrayan domination of the country. The aim of the government policy was to empower all ethnicities and develop their cultures and languages. Also it was widely seen as a solution to the demand of governance preferred by the ethnic-based liberation fronts and parties participating in the July Convention of Nationalities in 1991. In response to critics who say ethnic federalism can bring divisions, Meles said that this policy served many interests, including equitable distribution of wealth and empowerment of ethnicities. He said the "ethnic basis of Ethiopia's democracy stemmed from the government's fight against poverty and the need for an equitable distribution of the nation's wealth: peasants must be enabled to make their own decisions in terms of their own culture. Power must be devolved to them in ways that they understand, and they understand ethnicity.... Other approaches to development had been hegemonic and exploitative and had led to internecine strife and civil war."

Meles claimed that there are two basic views about ethnic federalism: "if you think it is a threat, it will be; if you think it a benefit, then it will be." Making this statement, he concluded that "ethnicity will become less an issue as the economy grows and Ethiopia's process of assimilation does its job."

Meles Zenawi's government introduced a diverse but controversial policy of decentralization of the language system in Ethiopia. Most Ethiopians are taught using their mother tongue in primary schools and they are encouraged to develop their own languages. Some critics have said that this policy harms the unity and national identity of the country, while others have supported and praised the policy. Currently, many regional states have their own official state language. For instance, Afaan Oromo is the official language of the Oromia regional state but Amharic is still the official working language in the State of Southern Nations, Nationalities and Peoples.

=== Freedom of religion ===
Although Muslims and Orthodox Christians lived together in Ethiopia for many centuries, complete religious freedom was formalized only in 1991. Many of the pre-existing issues – dominance of the state religion to 1974, seizure of the church properties by the Mengistu regime, 1974–91, state-sponsored persecution of non-Orthodox Christians, second-class citizenship accorded to Ethiopian Muslims, landownership problems and similar issues for non-Orthodox believers – have subsided for the most part. There are currently between 12 and 15 million Protestant Christians, as well as other new non-Orthodox Christians. Clashes have been very rare with the domination of the Orthodox. Most analysts say that since such equality and full religious freedom didn't exist before, the infrequent clashes might occur until the culture of tolerance grows between all old and new religions and denominations.

=== Multi-party system ===
Meles became the first Ethiopian leader to develop a multi-party system, including an opposition party, in the Ethiopian parliament.

=== Private Press ===
While previously most of the media were politically oriented, following the government crackdowns on media after 2005 election the number of political media is going down while entertainment and business media are on the rise. On the other hand, for what is believed to be the first time in Ethiopia's history, the government granted private commercial FM radio licenses, to two domestic pro-government operators. As of 2009, there are over 56 radio stations in the country that are owned and operated by regional governments, community organisations, and private companies. The government has issued licenses for seven regional states' television transmissions agencies, but there are still no private broadcasters in the country.

=== Equity and growth ===
Throughout its operation, the government and the Prime Minister have advocated "pro-poor" domestic policies. According to World Bank's East African leadership, the Ethiopian government ranks number one in Africa on spending as a share of GDP going to pro-poor sectors.

The administration has also created self-governing regional development organizations like Amhara Development Association, Tigray Development Association, Oromia Development Association and many others.

Even though Meles' administration inherited one of the worst economies in the world, the country's economy grew steadily after he took office. During the last seven years, Ethiopia's GDP has shown a rate of growth of about 9 percent a year. The country was also in the top category for “policies of social inclusion and equity,” in the domain of “economic management,” and Ethiopia did exceptionally well in the domain of “structural policies” and “public sector management and institutions." Gross primary enrollment rates, a standard indicator of investment in the poor, went up to 93 percent in 2004 from 72 percent in 1990, contributing to a rise in literacy rates from 50 percent in 1997 to 65 percent in 2002. Still some opposition parties in the Ethiopian parliament doubted the economic growth. During the House's 31st regular session where the parliament reserved its monthly "Opposition Day," some opposition MPs condemned the ruling party, pointing to double-digit inflation as a sign of the government's economic failures. The African Development Bank and the Paris-based OECD Development Center stated that Ethiopia has become one of the fastest growing countries in Africa.

=== Foreign policies ===
Despite working together against the Derg regime, Meles and Afewerki's positive relationship turned sour after Meles succumbed to U.S. pressure to hold an election within a year, but Afewerki abandoned his original promise to create a transitional government in the early 1990s. The Eritrean-Ethiopian War began in May 1998. After the Ethiopian breach of the western front and subsequent capture of parts of western Eritrea, Ethiopian President Negaso Gidada gave a victory speech and a peace treaty was signed a few weeks later. According to the peace treaty Ethiopia then pulled out. Though Ethiopian troops controlled Badme, after an international court ruled that Badme belonged to Eritrea, Ethiopia continued to maintain a presence of Ethiopian soldiers in the town.

== Second term (2000-2005) ==
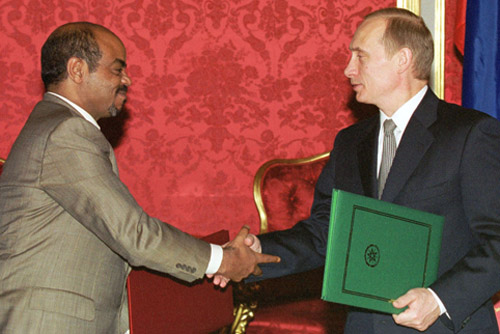
Meles with President of Russia Vladimir Putin on 3 December 2001

In the 2000 general elections, Meles was reelected Prime Minister, and his ruling EPRDF party shared parliament seats with the opposition party United Ethiopian Democratic Forces (UEDF). According to observers organized by Ethiopian Human Rights Council, local U.N. staff, diplomatic missions, political parties, and domestic non-governmental organizations, both the general and the regional elections that year were generally free and fair in most areas; however, serious election irregularities occurred in the Southern Nations, Nationalities and Peoples' Region (SNNPR), particularly in the Hadiya Zone.

=== School expansion ===
Since the 1990s Ethiopia has experienced more increase of schools and colleges despite still not covering all regions. Millions of Ethiopian birr (ETB) continue to be spent on building educational institutions and many new schools have been constructed since Meles Zenawi took office. However, the government's focus on the agricultural sector has slowed the growth of jobs in the urban areas of Ethiopia, which is reflected in the anger of the urban population and its students as well as the landslide victory of opposition parties in these areas during the recent national election. Statistics showed that in 1991 only 27 percent of Ethiopian children attended school, but in 2004 gross enrollment rate was up to 77 percent and it reached 85 percent in November 2006.

As of 2005, there were 13,500 elementary schools and 550 secondary schools. A majority of them are newly constructed and the secondary schools are connected by satellite in a new programme called School-Net.

More colleges and Universities have been constructed and/or expanded during the last few years than in whole history of Ethiopia. These colleges and Universities include Adama University (Oromia), an expansion of Nazreth technical college, Jimma University (started earlier), Mekelle University newly built under Meles, Debub University, an expansion of Awassa college, Bahir Dar (Amhara state) University, an expansion of a polytechnic college and teacher's college, and others. Also most of the older colleges have added various new departments, including faculties of law, business, etc. Other new growing colleges include Jijiga (Somali state) University, institutions in Debre Markos, Semera (Afar), Aksum, Tepi, Nekemte (Oromia), Kombolcha (Amhara State), Dire Dawa and in Debre Birhan. Wollega University in the Oromia state is the most recently finished university in Ethiopia with various modern facilities, with 20 new fields of study and the new Wolaita Soddo University started taking in students in February 2007. Including the new Axum University, 12 new universities are starting operation in 2007 Other fairly new universities like Dilla University in the Gedeo Zone SNNP region launched new facilities, expanded laboratories for research, and initiated new post-graduate studies.

In the last decade, more than 30 new private colleges & universities have been created, including Unity College. The University Capacity Building Program (UCBP) is a leading project in this sector.

=== Land and agriculture ===
Ethiopian agriculture is predominantly rain-fed subsistence agriculture, troubled by recurrent droughts. After Meles came to power in 1991, there were three major droughts in 1999/2000, 2002/2003 and 2009/2010.

The most significant reform regarding land use after Meles took power was the dissolution of the collective farms and redistribution of land at local levels. The demand for land ownership, expressed in the slogan "Land to the tiller," was central in toppling the feudal monarchy. The demand, however, was not fully answered. The new constitution, in Article 40, section 3, states that, "The right to own rural and urban land as well as natural resources belongs only to the state and the people". The farmers have land use rights, but uncertain transfer rights. Starting in 2008, this land policy was set back after the government announced that it would begin leasing large areas of "empty" farm lands to foreign investors. Derided internationally as "land grabs," these operations threaten some smallholders with the loss of their plots. Reporting on this issue, the New York Times, quoting an expert, wrote, "One thing that is very clear, that seems to have escaped the attention of most investors, is that this is not simply empty land"

The government defends its land policy, given the common occurrences of natural disasters such as drought or bad weather. The government says that had farmers been allowed to own land, they might have been forced to sell it during drought. To prevent this, the EPRDF government believes land ownership should not be privatized. Accordingly, the government states that it should focus on its agriculture sector while it is developing its industrial sector simultaneously, so that it can balance everything once the other sectors are developed and increase productivity. Government transformation of the construction sector, for example, led to a rare construction boom from the early 2000s until cement and other shortages caused it to slow down. The government believes privatization should be employed in the future but not presently. Knowing that constitutional change is required to privatize lands, the government assumed that it would hold a long-term super majority in parliament, to enable it to make the transition.

Since this approach to land ownership is unconventional, especially to Western nations, opposition political parties have used this to their advantage during elections, arguing that land ownership has to be privatized. Yet the government seems unfaltering and states that flexibility is needed to address the lack of industrial development in the country despite accusations from the opposition.

== Third term (2005-2010) ==
=== Election violence ===
Meles encountered his first real challenge in the 2005 elections. His party was declared winner and kept his prime minister seat for another term, although the major opposition groups (the Coalition for Unity and Democracy (CUD), UEDF, and the Oromo Federalist Democratic Movement) gained a number of seats in the national parliament. More than 30 other political parties participated in the election. These elections were the most contested and the most controversial in Ethiopia's short democratic history, with some opposition parties arguing that the election was stolen by the ruling party. Allegations of fraud were especially strong in the rural areas, as the opposition parties won in most urban areas, whereas the EPRDF won mostly in rural districts.

The aftermath of the election led to riots and demonstrations against the results, particularly in the capital, which had to be stopped by peace officers. Some opposition parties blamed the government for the violence, even though they were tried and convicted in the court of the countries law. At the end of the demonstration, along with seven police officers 193 citizens were killed and 763 civilians wounded. Tens of thousands of Ethiopians were also jailed. Many protesters and around 75 police officers were injured. This led to many rounds of accusations between the government and the protesters where the Information Minister Berhan Hailu said the government was "sorry and sad", but blamed the violence on the CUD.

In an interview, the United States AID director repeated that the Carter Center understood that the ruling party (EPRDF) won the election and most of his peers confirmed that as well. The USAID director also criticized some EU observers, accusing them of bias and favoring the opposition. He said some European observers practiced outside of their jobs and went "overboard in encouraging the opposition and making them think that somehow they had won the election." He concluded that the American government never believed the opposition won the election.

=== Agriculture ===
To bring order and transparency to the agricultural sector, the country started its first market exchange program and company, called Ethiopia Commodity Exchange. In April 2008, the country finalized the exchange, according to Meles Zenawi, to "revolutionalize the country's backward and inefficient marketing system."

Other than the dominant coffee industry, the government has made the floriculture industry another sector where Ethiopia can have comparative advantage. Various Kenyan investors have already moved to Ethiopia and the industry seems to be growing rapidly. Flower growers from other countries were also said to be relocating to Ethiopia. Ethiopia recently became Africa's second largest flower exporter after Kenya, with its export earnings growing by 500 per cent over the past year. According to the Oromia Investment Commission, foreign investors are taking advantage of the new favorable investment opportunity in the sugar sector, where recently $7.5 billion has been invested. Ethiopia also depends on livestock exports as well. Issues relating to wildlife conservation have been tackled aggressively under Meles Zenawi. The World Wildlife Fund praised the Ethiopian government's progress, saying, "Ethiopia has set a fine example for other countries to emulate."

Another issue promoted by Meles Zenawi has been economic development in "green fashion." Discussing during an annual meeting under the Clinton Global Initiative in September 2007, Meles debated with Tony Blair and other world leaders about global warming and trade. According to Reuters, Meles stated the need for a cap and trade mechanism and for different strategies towards Africa, since it did not contribute as much towards global warming.

=== Economic growth ===
A recent issue has been the shortage of cement to sustain the construction boom in the country. However, foreign and native investment, including the recent investment in a US$5 billion cement factory in Misraq Gojjam Zone of the Amhara Region, are an attempt to stabilize the situation. Still the brief severe shortage that occurred in 2005 was blamed on Meles Zenawi's policies that were alleged to ignore urban development. Other recent development in the country included a first car factory in Ethiopia that assembles cars to sell for local- and export-markets, as well as cars that use liquefied petroleum gas, bus manufacturing in Mek'ele and taxi manufacturing in Modjo city, Oromia state. The dramatic development of most sectors in Ethiopia–including textiles, leather, garments, agriculture, beverages, construction, and others–has caused Ethiopia to be labeled the "East African land of opportunity" by the World Investment News.

 Ethiopia's economic growth has come at the expense of inflation.[65] The World Bank, in Ethiopia's country profile in 2010, mentioned the underlying inflation threat that started in 2008 might continue.[66] Despite the inflation and differences in the rate of economic growth in reports among several international organizations, they continued to praise the economic growth. The African Development Bank claimed that Ethiopia "is registering a remarkable economic growth in recent years."[67] On top of that various social concerns exist and the Ethiopian section of VOA news on its Amharic language program has reported about problems facing farmers and growers who often get less profit due to the market exploitation of middlemen.

=== Climate change ===
Meles played an important role in developing the African Union's position on climate change since 2009 and was a 'friend of the Chair' at the 15th Conference of the Parties (COP15) to the United Nations Framework Convention on Climate Change (UNFCCC).

On 31 August 2009, Meles was appointed Chair of the African Heads of State and Government on Climate Change (CAHOSCC). The group had been established following the 4 February 2009 decision at the 12th AU Assembly of Heads of States to build a common Africa position on climate change in preparations for COP15.

Prior to Meles' appointment, but in light of the AU's decision and the Algiers Declaration on the African Common Platform to Copenhagen, on 19 May 2009 the Africa Group made a submission to the UNFCCC that included demands for US$67 billion per year in finance for adaptation funding and US$200 billion per year for mitigation and set targets in terms of reductions of emissions by developed countries not by reference to temperature.

On 3 September 2009 Meles made a speech to the Africa Partnership Forum where he said:”

We will never accept any global deal that does not limit global warming to the minimum unavoidable level, no matter what levels of compensation and assistance are promised to us… While we will reason with everyone to achieve our objective, we will not rubber stamp an agreement by the powers that be as the best we could get for the moment. We will use our numbers to delegitimize any agreement that is not consistent with our minimal position. If needs be we are prepared to walk out of any negotiations that threaten to be another rape of our continent.

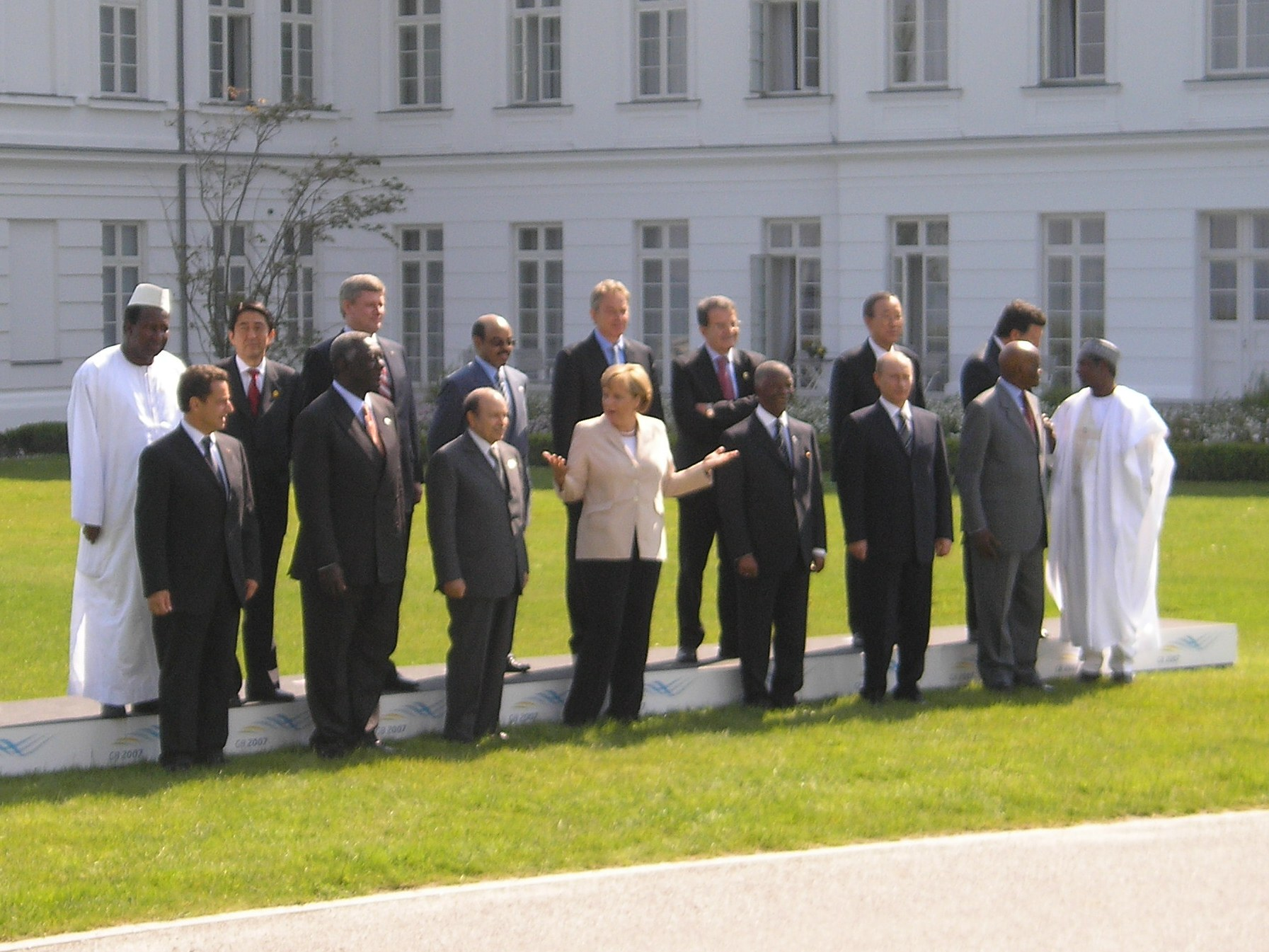
At the 33rd G8 summit in Heiligendamm in 2007 (Meles at elevated row fourth from left)

On 12 December 2009 at COP15, the Africa Group made a further submission to the UNFCCC that called for 45% emission reductions by developed countries by 2020, finance for adaptation of $150 billion immediately as special drawing rights from the IMF, $400 billion in fast-track financing, and 5% of developed countries' GNP in longer-term financing. On 15 December 2009 Meles Zenawi issued a joint press release with the President of France, Nicolas Sarkozy, which declared that the African Union position at Copenhagen was a 2 °C temperature target, 10 billion euros in 'fast-track financing,' and 100 billion euros in 'long-term financing.' This new position from Meles was observed to be the same as the European Union's position and received widespread condemnation by other African leaders, including Namibian Prime Minister Nahas Angula, Lesotho’s Bruno Sekoli, Ugandan chief negotiator and Minister of Water and Environment Maria Mutagamba and Sudan’s Ambassador and Chair of G77, Lumumba Di-Aping. African civil society groups condemned the position as a betrayal of Africa. Archbishop Desmond Tutu said the two degree target "condemns Africa to incineration and no modern development".

=== Women's rights ===
The Ethiopian leadership has made significant advances to protect women's rights in recent years. It has its first Minister of Women's Affairs and has overhauled legislation on rape, female genital mutilation, and other offences.

=== Foreign policy ===
==== Water ====
Meles moved to have Ethiopia gain a larger share of the Nile River water. Part of this entailed using Ethiopia's hydropower prospects as leverage in exporting power to Egypt, amongst others. He had also aided the Sudan People's Liberation Army/Movement prior to South Sudan's independence as the rebels fought the government in Khartoum.

==== Somalia ====
In 2006, the Islamic Courts Union (ICU) assumed control of much of the southern part of Somalia and promptly imposed Shari'a law. The Transitional Federal Government sought to re-establish its authority, and, with the assistance of Ethiopian troops, African Union peacekeepers and air support by the United States, managed to drive out the rival ICU. On 8 January 2007, as the Battle of Ras Kamboni raged, TFG President and founder Abdullahi Yusuf Ahmed, a former colonel in the Somali Army, entered Mogadishu for the first time since being elected to office. The Somali government then relocated to Villa Somalia in the capital from its interim location in Baidoa. This marked the first time since the fall of the Siad Barre regime in 1991 that the federal government controlled most of the country.

Following this defeat, the Islamic Courts Union splintered into several different factions. Some of the more radical elements, including Al-Shabaab, regrouped to continue their insurgency against the TFG and oppose the Ethiopian military's presence in Somalia. Throughout 2007 and 2008, Al-Shabaab scored military victories, seizing control of key towns and ports in both central and southern Somalia. At the end of 2008, the group had captured Baidoa but not Mogadishu. By January 2009, Al-Shabaab and other militias had managed to force the Ethiopian troops to retreat, leaving behind an under-equipped African Union peacekeeping force to assist the TFG's troops.

Between 31 May and 9 June 2008, representatives of Somalia's TFG and the Alliance for the Re-liberation of Somalia (ARS) group of Islamist rebels participated in peace talks in Djibouti brokered by the former United Nations Special Envoy to Somalia, Ahmedou Ould-Abdallah. The conference ended with a signed agreement calling for the withdrawal of Ethiopian troops in exchange for the cessation of armed confrontation. Parliament was subsequently expanded to 550 seats to accommodate ARS members, which then elected Sheikh Sharif Sheikh Ahmed, the former ARS chairman, to office.

In October 2011, a coordinated multinational operation began against Al-Shabaab in southern Somalia, with the Ethiopian military eventually joining the mission the following month. According to Ramtane Lamamra, the AU Commissioner for Peace and Security, the additional Ethiopian and AU troop reinforcements are expected to help the Somali authorities gradually expand their territorial control.

== Fourth term (2010-2012) ==
=== Women's rights ===
The TPLF has associated itself with gender equality since the days of armed conflict, when, in the northern states, Tigrayan and some Amhara women soldiers fought together with men against the Derg dictatorship. Meles Zenawi's administration, along with First Lady Azeb Mesfin, have strongly advocated for more equal rights and opportunities for women in Ethiopia. Despite the country having a rich history of respected queens and empresses, Meles inherited a national situation in which Ethiopian women did not have equality or basic rights. Since his administration began, there has been a steady growth of women's organizations, women activists and employment opportunities and a forum where women discuss backward cultural issues on national television. In their long fight against destructive traditional practices, HIV transmission, early marriage, lack of legal rights for women, unfair public policies, job opportunity and other issues, various organizations continue to work with the government including the Ethiopian Women's Lawyers Association (EWLA), Network of Ethiopian Women's Associations, the Ethiopia Media Women's Association (MWA), the Young Women's Christian Association (YWCA), Women in Self Employment (WISE), the Ethiopian Medical Women's Association (EMWA), the Women's Association of Tigray (WAT), the Kembatti Mentti Gezzima-tope (KMG), the Ethiopian Nurse Midwives Association (ENA) and others.

=== Water ===
One of the most important resources of the country, water (the Nile), has also been a focus of Meles's administration. Due to the potential conflict that can occur between Egypt and Ethiopia, Meles's EPRDF-led government has chosen to initiate and support programs that would benefit all sides in the use of the Nile. So far many small scale dams have been constructed in Ethiopia but large dams have been rare because of limited financial capabilities. The country is planning to export electricity to Sudan and Djibouti by 2010, and has currently began the newest project in western Ethiopia to construct Africa's biggest hydroelectric dam, located on the Ethiopia–Sudan border.
