= Marxist–Leninist League of Tigray =

Communist party in Ethiopia (1983–1991)

- Leader: Meles Zenawi
- Founded: 1983
- Dissolved: 1991
- Ideology: Communism; Marxism–Leninism; Hoxhaism; Anti-revisionism
- Political position: Far-left
- National affiliation: Tigray People's Liberation Front

The Marxist–Leninist League of Tigray (MLLT) was a semi-clandestine Hoxhaist Communist Party that held a leading role in the Tigrayan Peoples' Liberation Front (TPLF) in the 1980s. The majority of the TPLF leadership held dual membership in the MLLT, including Meles Zenawi, Prime Minister of the Federal Democratic Republic of Ethiopia from 1995 until his death in 2012.

== Formation of the Marxist-Leninist League of Tigray ==
The Tigray People's Liberation Front started as a student group during the rise of revolutions in the world in the 1960s. At the beginning of the inception of the TPLF, the main focus was an ethno-nationalist ideology. Later Marxist-Leninist views came to be an important part of the party ideology. This coincided with the spreading of Marxism-Leninism throughout the world and more specifically the upper classes, students, and educated population of Tigray. They started to focus on social issues, wealth inequality, and imperialism.

Mass strikes occurred in Ethiopia in 1974 causing large political confusion and change. The armed forces of Ethiopia formed the Derg, which took control of the country in the midst of the confusion. The Derg attempted to push other marxist groups out of the main political discourse.

In the late 1970's the TPLF started using guerilla warfare against the Derg to protest the political changes being made. The TPLF was following an ethno-nationalist ideology fighting for a free Tigray Region. The Marxist–Leninist League of Tigray formed in 1985 to help organize the fight against the Derg. The formation of the Marxist–Leninist League of Tigray also helped complete the transition to a complete Marxist-Leninist ideology intertwined with the ethno-nationalist foundation of the Tigray People's Liberation Front.

the MLLT was established in 1983 as "pre-party organization" called the Organization of the Vanguard Elements. This grouping would become the MLLT in 1985 to serve as a "vanguard party for the TPLF". According to Aregawi Berhe, the MLLT held its founding congress on 25 July 1985 in the gorge of the Wari River.

== Importance of the Marxist-Leninist League of Tigray ==
Posing as orthodox defenders of Marxism-Leninism and allying itself with the communist current associated with the hard-line Enver Hoxha regime in Albania, the MLLT saw its goals as spreading Marxism-Leninism throughout the world and within the Tigray region.

At the beginning of the Ethiopian Civil War, The TPLF was unorganized in their plans and execution. With only an organization and no political party backing them they suffered large losses at the beginning. After the creation of the Marxist-Leninist League of Tigray, the TPLF developed a cohesive discipline strategy because of the leadership of the MLLT. The TPLF with the help of the new vanguard party reorganized the structure of the army based on Marxist-Leninist ideology. In the process of reorganization, the MLLT attempted to clear out other parties and ideology that made up the front and center the views strictly on Marxism-Leninism. Shortly after the reorganization, the TPLF pushed the Ethiopian army backwards, nearing Addis Ababa.

The power of the TPLF was transitioned and concentrated into The MLLT following the Leninist ideology of an intellectual intelligentsia leading the revolution. With this model as the new core of the TPLF, several policies were put in place. These policies aimed to address; land reform, class rule, and rights of nationalities.

=== Land reform ===
The TPLF being run by the MLLT made many policy changes that were often compared to those made by the Derg previously. The Derg attempted land distribution before, but due to constant corruption and weak influence in the region of Tigray, they failed. The Derg pulled out of Tigray allowing for the TPLF and MLLT to decide how land reform should take place. During this conference the TPLF and MLLT decided to cement their place as the party for the peasants by allowing them to decide how to fairly redistribute the land.

=== Class rule ===
The MLLT was the vanguard party for the TPLF until 1991. During the period between 1985 and 1991 the MLLT focused on the idea of class rule through mass organization. Through the mass organization initiative the MLLT and TPLF decided the direction and action of the party. Unlike the Derg, the TPLF and MLLT would use mass organization to inquire what policy or changes would be best.

=== Right of nationalities ===
One of the most important pillars of the TPLF and MLLT because of how closely related to Marxism-Leninism it is, the TPLF and MLLT. Not trying to divide the country based on ethno-national borders the TPLF and MLLT worked to form a united coalition with other ethno-nationalist parties to demonstrate how a united Ethiopia could exist despite the many different ethno-nationalities within the country. This stance would become an issue with Eritrea later when the issue of secession arose.

== Involved conflicts ==
The emergence of the MLLT created some rifts with the Eritrean People's Liberation Front with which the TPLF was allied against the ruling Soviet-backed Ethiopian Derg. The MLLT took a much harder line on the role of the Soviet Union in the world, which they along with Albania viewed as social-imperialist and an enemy of the oppressed of the world. The EPLF held a more flexible line viewing the Soviet support for the Derg as a tactical mistake on their part and avoided any public denunciations of the Soviet Union. The opposition to the Soviet Union continues the trend of the MLLT aligning with the Albanian Party of Labour and leader Enver Hoxha.

Regarding Eritrea, The TPLF and MLLT were allied at the beginning of their inception with the Eritrean People's Liberation Front. Working together due to similar political goals, in the late 1980's the alliance broke down. The TPLF continued their belief that ethno-nationalist groups have the right to self determinate, and to go as far as to secede from their current country. The EPLF and Eritrea, similar to Ethiopia, had many different ethno-nationalities within its much smaller borders. The TPLF started to work with other Eritrean groups on the side due to this difference in platforms.

In 1985, the same year as the founding of the MLLT, the EPLF cut off the only route to Somalia from Ethiopia just before aid was being delivered to Ethiopia due to famine. The route was closed because the EPLF believed that the action taken by the TPLF and MLLT was an act of betrayal. The action taken by the EPLF would mark a change in the relationship by the two parties. Conflict was resolved as both the EPLF and TPLF continued their armed struggles. As the EPLF saw success in their war, they sent reinforcements to The TPLF to support their taking of the capital in 1991.

== Fall of the Marxist-Leninist League of Tigray ==
The fall of the Marxist-Leninist League of Tigray began in 1989 and continued until 1991. During its fall the TPLF changed their parties platform and beliefs. Moving away from Marxism-Leninism, the party moved their stance to Revolutionary Democracy.

In 1989 The TPLF and MLLT joined a united front against the Derg due to widespread state violence being committed. This popular front was the catalyst to the fall of The MLLT because Marxism-Leninism was no longer the central goal of the TPLF, but instead became the overthrow of the Derg.

In 1990 the shift from Marxism-Leninism began when Meles Zenawi announced the changing party platform to Revolutionary Democracy in a speech given in the United States.

With the coming to power of the TPLF in 1991 and the collapse of communist regime in Albania, the TPLF dropped all references to Marxism-Leninism. The leadership of the TPLF claims that the MLLT dissolved when the TPLF-backed Ethiopian People's Revolutionary Democratic Front took power after the collapse of the Ethiopian Democratic People's Republic in 1991.

== See also ==
- List of anti-revisionist groups
