= Meles Zenawi Foundation =

Nonprofit organization in Ethiopia

- መለስ ዘናዊ ፋውንዴሽን
- Formation: 6 April 2013; 13 years ago
- Founded at: African Union Headquarter, Addis Ababa, Ethiopia
- Type: Nonprofit
- Purpose: Policy and development
- Headquarters: Kazanchis
- Location: Addis Ababa, Ethiopia
- Coordinates: 9.021°N 38.772°E
- Website: www.ethiopiantreasures.co.uk/meleszenawi/

Meles Zenawi Foundation (Amharic: መለስ ዘናዊ ፋውንዴሽን; MZF) is a nonprofit organization to honor the late prime minister of Ethiopia Meles Zenawi, who ruled from 1995 until his death in 2012. The foundation was established on 6 April 2013 at the 7th Congress of African Union in Addis Ababa.

In 2015, the symposium for the foundation was established in Kigali, Rwanda.

== History ==
Meles Zenawi Foundation was inaugurated on 6 April 2013 at 7th congress of at the African Union in Addis Ababa. The foundation is named after to honor the late prime minister of Ethiopia Meles Zenawi, who ruled from 1995 to 2012.

The foundation was endorsed by the House of Peoples’ Representatives (HoPR) on 25 January intended to serve "as Meles Zenawi’s final resting place; as a sanctuary for Meles Zenawi’s political legacy to Ethiopia and the rest of Africa; and as a site for scholarship on Meles Zenawi’s words and deeds." It is dedicated for his legacy

of his lifelong commitment to peace, justice, economic development, good governance, and democracy for the Ethiopian and African people, and provide a living memorial to his selfless struggle and statesmanship for the freedom and equality of the peoples of Ethiopia; a place for the study of the new life that Meles Zenawi breathed into Africa’s aspiration for peace, democracy and development.

On 21 August 2015, a symposium for the foundation was inaugurated in Kigali, Rwanda.

== See also ==
- Meles Zenawi and Legacy
