= Bereket Simon =

Ethiopian politician

- በረከት ስምኦን

Minister of Communication Affairs
- In office 1995–2012
- Prime Minister: Meles Zenawi
- Preceded by: Position established
- Succeeded by: Getachew Reda

Personal details
- Born: 1960s Dabat, Begemder, Ethiopian Empire (now Amhara Region, Ethiopia)
- Party: Amhara Democratic Party
- Other political affiliations: Tigray People's Liberation Front

Bereket Simon (Tigrinya: በረከት ስምኦን; born 1960s) is an Ethiopian politician who had served as Minister of Communication Affairs from its establishment in 1995 to 2012. He was affiliated to the ruling Ethiopian People's Revolutionary Democratic Front (EPRDF), of which he was a founding member. He was a close friend of former prime minister Meles Zenawi since their University days. He was widely considered as Meles Zenawi's right-hand man.

== Personal life ==
Bereket was born in Dabat to an Eritrean family. As he was in high school in 1978, he was likely born in the 1960s.

== Legal issues ==
On 23 January 2019, Bereket was arrested by the Amhara Region government in relation to corruption along with Tadesse Kassa, a civil servant. On 8 May 2020, Bereket was convicted of corruption and sentenced to six years of prison. Tadesse Kassa, a former TIRET Corporation board member, was also convicted. However, after serving probation in prison located in Bahir Dar, the government released him on account of parole on 25 January 2023. According to his defense lawyer Hiwot Lilay, Bereket should be released in September 2022 for his one-third of jail term in accordance with the regional law, despite having no opportunity to him.
