= Network of Ethiopian Women's Associations =

- Abbreviation: NEWA
- Formation: 2003
- Type: Non-governmental organization
- Purpose: Advancement of women's rights, gender equality and women's empowerment
- Headquarters: Addis Ababa, Ethiopia

The Network of Ethiopian Women's Associations is a national network of Ethiopian societies who share the goal of advancing women’s rights, gender equality, and women’s empowerment in Ethiopia.

== History ==
The Network of Ethiopian Women's Associations states that it was created in 2003 as a network of non-governmental organizations and women's associations in Ethiopia.

After a change in the Charities and Societies law in 2009, NEWA reorganized itself as a consortium of Ethiopian societies working on gender equality and women's rights. NEWA consisted of 42 organizations and associations from around Ethiopia in 2009. NEWA said that it aimed at a "vision of an Ethiopian society where gender equality is realized [and] becomes the normal context for women's and men's lives in Ethiopia".

== Area of expertise ==
The network aims to ensure that women and men at all levels are made aware of women's constitutional and legal rights, and to solicit practical support from various sectors.

== Works ==
NEWA recently created a book featuring the stories of 64 of the women interviewed so far, selected to portray a wide range of occupations, ages and backgrounds and for the inspirational quality of their stories.
