= North Gojjam Zone =

Zone in the Amhara Regional State

North Gojjam Zone ሰሜን ጎጃም ዞን
- Zone
- Country: Ethiopia
- Region: Amhara
- Established: 2023
- Seat: Bahir Dar

Government
  - Chief administrator: Asefa Tilahun (Prosperity Party)

Area
  - Land: 6,980 km^{2} (2,690 sq mi)
- Time zone: UTC+3 (East Africa Time)

North Gojjam Zone (Amharic: ሰሜን ጎጃም ዞን) is a zonal administration in the Amhara Region of Ethiopia. North Gojjam Zone is one of 14 zones in Amhara Region covering 6,980 km². The zone shares its boundaries with South Gondar Zone to the east, Agew Awi Zone to the west, Central Gondar Zone to the north, and West Gojjam Zone to the south. North Gojjam Zone is established in 2023 by incorporating districts and town administrations which were previously administered in the West Gojjam Zone.

== Woredas ==
The regions and zones of Ethiopia

North Gojjam Zone is formed from the union of three city administrations and four woredas. These administrative divisions are shown in the following table.

Woredas and City administrations in North Gojjam Zone Zone
Number	Woredas	Seat
1	Bahir Dar Zuria	Bahir Dar
2	Debub Achefer	Durbete*
3	Debub Mecha	Gerechech
4	Gonji Kolela	Gonji
5	Semien Achefer	Liben
6	Semien Mecha	Merawi*
7	Yilmana Densa	Adet*

* City administrations, which are considered as Woreda for all administrative purposes.
