= History of Bahir Dar =

Bahir Dar is the capital city of the Amhara Region in Ethiopia.

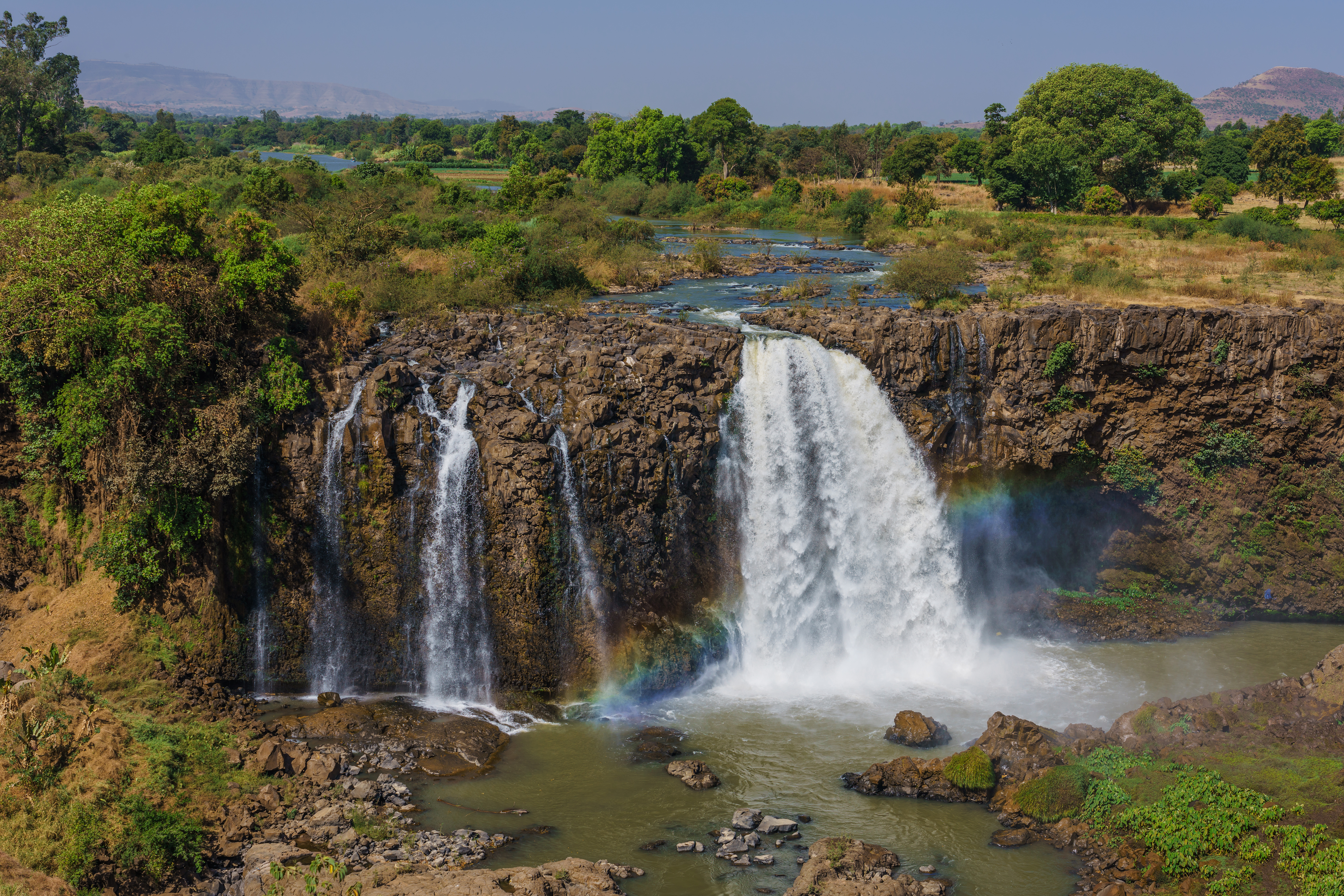
Blue Nile Falls Tis Issat near Bahir Dar

Bahir Dar is a popular tourist destination, offering a variety of attractions including the nearby Lake Tana and the Blue Nile River. The city is distinctly known for its wide avenues lined with palm trees and a variety of colorful flowers'

Bahir Dar was established around the thirteenth century following the construction of Kidanemariam Church at the present site of St. George Church. The city earned the name Bahir Dar, meaning “near the sea,” during the reign of Emperor Yikuno Amlak.

== Account from travellers ==
Bahir Dar has been home to various monasteries around the Amhara region. Its location at the source of the Blue Nile, as well as its proximity to an important trade route, made Bahir Dar an economic hub linking northern and southern Ethiopia that was frequented by European travellers. The first known document describing Bahir Dar was written by Alexandria Edouard Blondel, a Belgian consul who visited the area in 1842. He referred to the city as a small village.

The second known document was written by French traveller Antoine D'Abbadie, who visited Bahir Dar a year later. His brother Arnaud D'Abbadie made a similar visit and both men referred to Bahir Dar as a town. Walter Plowden, a British envoy to Ethiopia, also visited Bahir Dar in the mid-1840s. Unlike the D'Abbadie brothers, Plowden described Bahir Dar as a rich local market where grains were exchanged for salt. Moreover, Plowden called Bahir Dar a "town" and its people "town people".

Both the D'Abbadie brothers and Plowden travelled to Bahir Dar by reed boat, with the former crossing the outlet of the Blue Nile and the latter crossing the lake itself. All three travellers observed political conflict between Ras Ali II of Begemder and Beru Goshu of Gojjam over the possession Bahir Dar due to its important as a trading port.

Bahir Dar was also visited by Italian travellers Carlo Piaggia and Mario Alamanni. Piaggia lived in Qorat'a from 1873 to 1874, while Alamanni visited Bahir Dar in 1889. Piaggia noted that Bahir Dar was located south of Gojjam, which had controlled the passage of trade at the mouth of the lake. Likewise, Alamanni viewed Bahir Dar as an important cultural centre, alongside Gondar, Yifag, Daria, Qorat'a in the north and Debre Werq, Dima, Bure, Debre Markos and Basso in the south. Alamanni estimated the population of Bahir Dar at between 1,200 and 1,600 inhabitants.

== 1850s–1920 ==
Bahir Dar became noticeable in the mid-1850s via local accounts. In 1856, Emperor Tewodros II visited Bahir Dar on his return from Shewan campaigns. It was also said that he left Bahir Dar for Begemder ten years later, crossing the Blue Nile at Eger Bar. Likewise, Menelik II passed from Begemder to Shewa via Bahir Dar a number of times. He was said to have received it from local clergymen. In conclusion, both native and foreign accounts confirmed the city to be strategically important. However, not as local literature, mentioned the economic or social activities of the settlement as external sources.

By the late nineteenth century, the interest of European powers in Ethiopia had grown rapidly. Britain and Italy wanted to absorb the trade linkage with their respective territories of Sudan and Eritrea, with the British having a special interest in the control of Lake Tana. Britain sought to construct a barrage at the outlet of the lake in order to develop the economy of Anglo-Egyptian Sudan territory and sent various teams to study Bahir Dar. The first British expedition to Bahir Dar took place in 1902 and was led by M.C. Dupuis and his companion A.J. Hayes. Dupuis noted that the church Kidus Giyorgis was constructed with stone and lime while Hayes called the settlement a village. Moreover, Hayes describes the economic activities of local inhabitants, including the cultivation of grain and fishing in the shallow waters of the Blue Nile. Others earned an income by transporting people, goods, and pack animals across the Blue Nile across Begemder–Gojjam route via Kanfaro Abbay, along the mouth of the river from Lake Tana.

== 1920–1941 ==
The most authentic information was observed by the expedition in Lake Tana of the Grabham and Black mission (1920–21) from Britain. They saw local people grow maize, while wheat and barley were brought to the Bahir Dar market from the surrounding highland plateau.

The Grabham and Black mission also observed a large degree of trade activity at Bahir Dar, with people from large distances migrating to its markets. In 1924, the Ethiopian government ordered the construction of a dam by the British across the outlet of Lake Tana in an effort to support further economic growth.

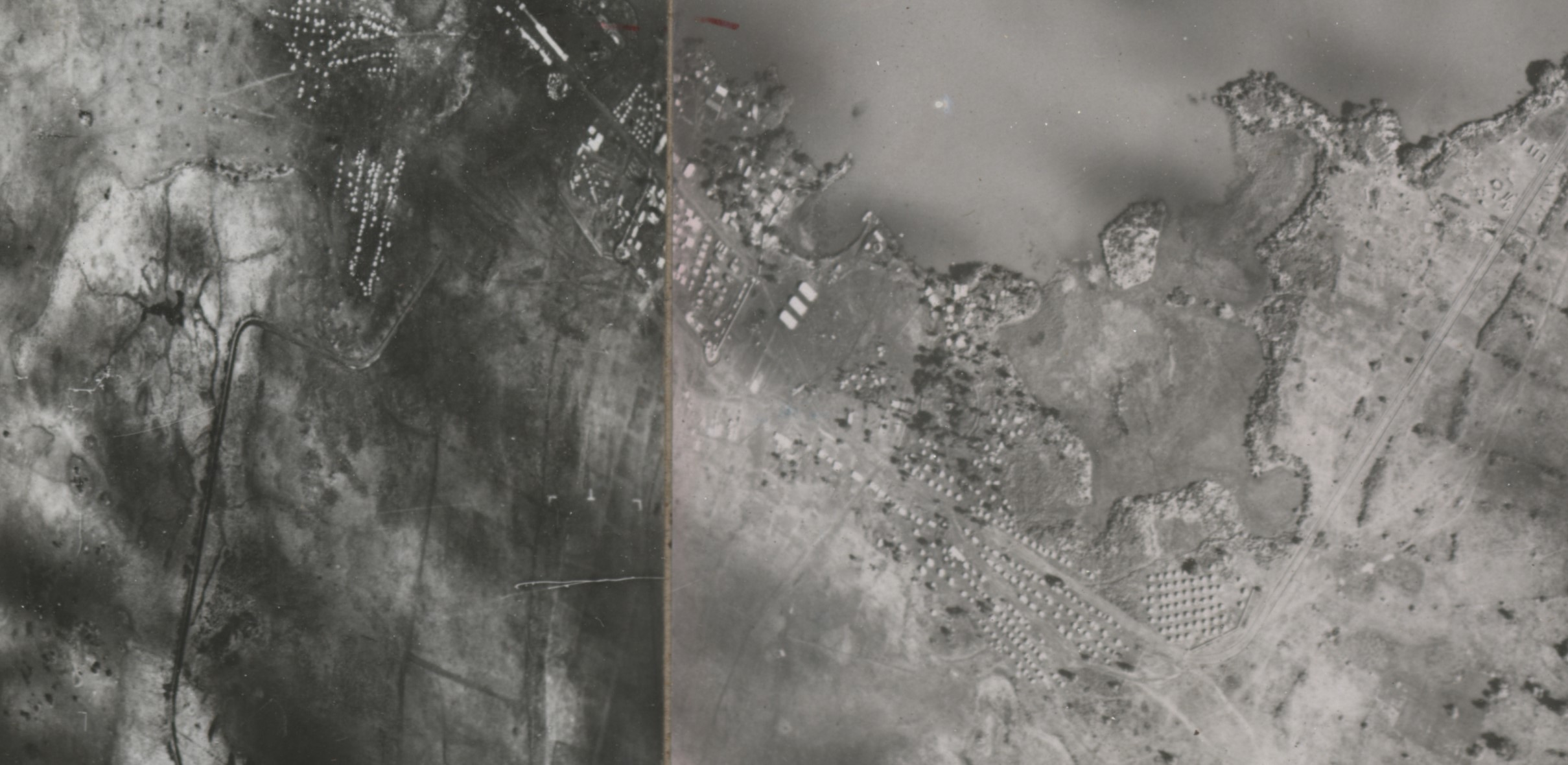
Aerial view of Bahir Dar in 1938

While the Ethiopian government idealized road construction between Bahir Dar and Addis Ababa via Debre Markos, the British desired to connect Bahir Dar with Sudan. The Ethiopian government refused to comply because it opposed centralization with Addis Ababa. The Ethiopian government also recognized the significance of road construction between Addis Ababa and Bahir Dar in enabling dam construction without assistance from foreign governments.

In 1935, road construction was halted due to the Italian occupation of Ethiopia. In May 1936, the Italian troops captured Bahir Dar. They found that Bahir Dar was under months stic influence and decided to develop Bahir Dar with urban measures concurrent to Gondar, Dessie, Adwa, and similar cities. They decided to make it a military base and later the civil administrative centre of the whole southern region of Lake Tana, including the former autonomous Gojjam territories of Mecha, Yilmana Densa and Achefer.

In order to obtain full control, the Italians established a new town administration called the Residenza. This urban administration was granted full legal rights to raise revenues by taxing the locality of Bahir Dar and its market. The measure created drastic changes in the relationship between the landlords (balabbats) and tenants and the monastery administration. The policy was a reversal of the previous government and the Italians granted civil administration to the town and they could not pay tax or take advantage of the monastery administration. Conversely, the landlords and their tenants were forced to pay tax for residences.

The Italians developed Bahir Dar with modernized urban planning that superimposed the older structures and buildings. The land was allocated for different purposes such as administrative offices, army barracks, an airstrip, and port facilities on the lake shore new residential and commercial zones became emerging. Furthermore, they also developed a sewage system and transportation primarily linking Lake Tana area, Zege, Qorat'a, Dagi, and Gorgora. The Gorgora-Bahir Dar line was the principal trade supply between Gondar and Bahir Dar.

== 1941–present ==
Bahir Dar was promoted to municipality status in 1945. The head of the town administration was the Town Chief (shum), who was the chief secretary of the office of the woreda. Since then, Bahir Dar also behaved municipal structure that neither modelled the older system nor the Italian plan. Since then, the government imposed authority on the monastery leadership of Bahir Dar Giyorgis, entitling them to tax collection over the wider region of Abakabot. Landlords (balabbats) paid tax over estates to the monastery as they did before the Italian occupation.

Between the 1950s and 1960s, Bahir Dar continued urbanization, despite opposition from balabbats and clergy. At around 1950, Bahir Dar was considered a new capital of the Ethiopian Empire and made confusion in the local land market, with consequent vast inflation in local land values. In 1956, Bahir Dar reinstated the recession, at this time being made a province and Shambala Aemiro Silas Ababa appointed as governor.

During the Ethiopian Civil War, in May 1988, the 3rd Corp of the Third Revolutionary (TLA) made its headquarters at Bahir Dar. On 3–4 March 1990, the TLA abandoned Bahir Dar, blowing up a nearby bridge to prevent the TPLF/EPRDF occupying the city. On 23 February 1991, the Ethiopian People's Revolutionary Democratic Front (EPRDF) took control of the city as part of Operation Tewedros. Since the 1990s, the city grew as an industrial zone, received numerous investments, and became the capital of Amhara Region.

On 6–9 February 2007, the city hosted a National Investment Bazaar and Trade Fair to honor Millennium celebrations. On 22 June 2019, Bahir Dar was the setting for the Amhara Region coup d'état attempt, which involved coordinated assassinations of Amhara government officials in Bahir Dar and Addis Ababa. Victims of the assassination were the President of Amhara Region Ambachew Mekonnen, advisor Ezez Wassie, General Se'are Mekonnen along with his aide Gizae Aberra, and Amhara Region Attorney General Migbaru Kebede. On 24 June, the state media announced that General Asamnew Tsige was shot dead in Bahir Dar.
