= Achefer =

District in Amhara Region, Ethiopia

Coordinates: 11°50′N 37°10′E

Achefer (Amharic: አቸፈር) was a woreda in Amhara Region, Ethiopia. It was named for the historic district of Achefer, which was first mentioned in the 16th century. Part of the Mirab Gojjam Zone, Achefer was bordered on the south by the Agew Awi Zone, on the west by the Semien Gondar Zone, on the north by Lake Tana, on the northeast by Bahir Dar Zuria, and on the southeast by Merawi; the Lesser Abay River defined the woreda's eastern boundary. The woreda included Dek Island. The administrative center was Yesmala; other towns in Achefer included Durbete, Liben, Kunzela, Chiba and Wandege. Acheref was divided for Debub Achefer and Semien Achefer woredas.

== Demographics ==
Based on figures published by the Central Statistical Agency in 2005, this woreda has an estimated total population of 326,195, of whom 160,763 are men and 165,432 are women; 24,565 or 7.53% of its population are urban dwellers, which is about the same as the Zone average of 7.6%. With an estimated area of 2,515.64 square kilometers, Achefer has an estimated population density of 129.7 people per square kilometer, which is less than the Zone average of 174.47.

The 1994 national census reported a total population for this woreda of 238,255 in 45,400 households, of whom 121,895 were men and 116,360 were women; 14,197 or 5.96% of its population were urban dwellers. The largest ethnic group reported in Achefer was the Amhara (99.77%). Amharic was spoken as a first language by 99.86%. The majority of the inhabitants practiced Ethiopian Orthodox Christianity, with 98.77% reporting that as their religion, while 1.18% were Muslim.
