= Semien Achefer =

District in Amhara Region, Ethiopia

- Woreda
- Flag
- Interactive map of Semien Achefer
- Zone: Mirab Gojjam
- Region: Amhara

Area
  - Total: 1,152.43 km^{2} (444.96 sq mi)

Population (2012 est.)
  - Total: 206,658
  - Density: 179.324/km^{2} (464.446/sq mi)

Semien Achefer (also known as North Achefer or Liben) is a woreda in Amhara Region, Ethiopia. It is named for the historic district of Achefer, which was first mentioned in the 16th century. Part of the Mirab Gojjam Zone, Achefer is bordered on the south by Debub Achefer, on the west by the Semien Gondar Zone, on the north by Lake Tana, on the east by Bahir Dar Zuria, and on the southeast by Mecha; the Lesser Abay River defines the Woreda's eastern boundary. The woreda includes Dek Island. The administrative center is liben Town; other towns in Semien Achefer include Yesmala, Dembola, Sankira, Kunzila and Chimnba. Semien Achefer was part of former Achefer woreda before 1998 E.C. In this woreda Beles hydroelectric power generating station is found at Charman Dusuman kebele( water source of intake is from Lake Tana). Historical places in the woreda are Etege Mintewab Launched Palace( but now is not protected) at Kunzila zuria kebele, Gashola st. George Orthodox monastery at Gashola kebele, Abe Gubegna (the Famous writer of Alwoledm) etc.

== Demographics ==
Based on the 2007 national census conducted by the Central Statistical Agency of Ethiopia (CSA), this woreda has a total population of 189,716, of whom 96,856 are men and 92,860 women; 15,583 or 8.21% are urban inhabitants. The majority of the inhabitants practiced Ethiopian Orthodox Tewahido Christianity, with 99.05% reporting that as their religion.
