= African painting =

African painting is painting in African art.

African traditional culture and tribes do not seem to have great interest in two-dimensional representations in favour of sculpture and relief. However, decorative painting in African culture is often abstract and geometrical. Another pictorial manifestation is body painting, and face painting present for example in Maasai and Kĩkũyũ culture in their ceremony rituals. Ceremonial cave painting in certain villages can be found to be still in use. Note that Pablo Picasso and other modern artists were influenced by African sculpture and masks in their varied styles. Contemporary African artists follow western art movements and their paintings have little difference from occidental art works.

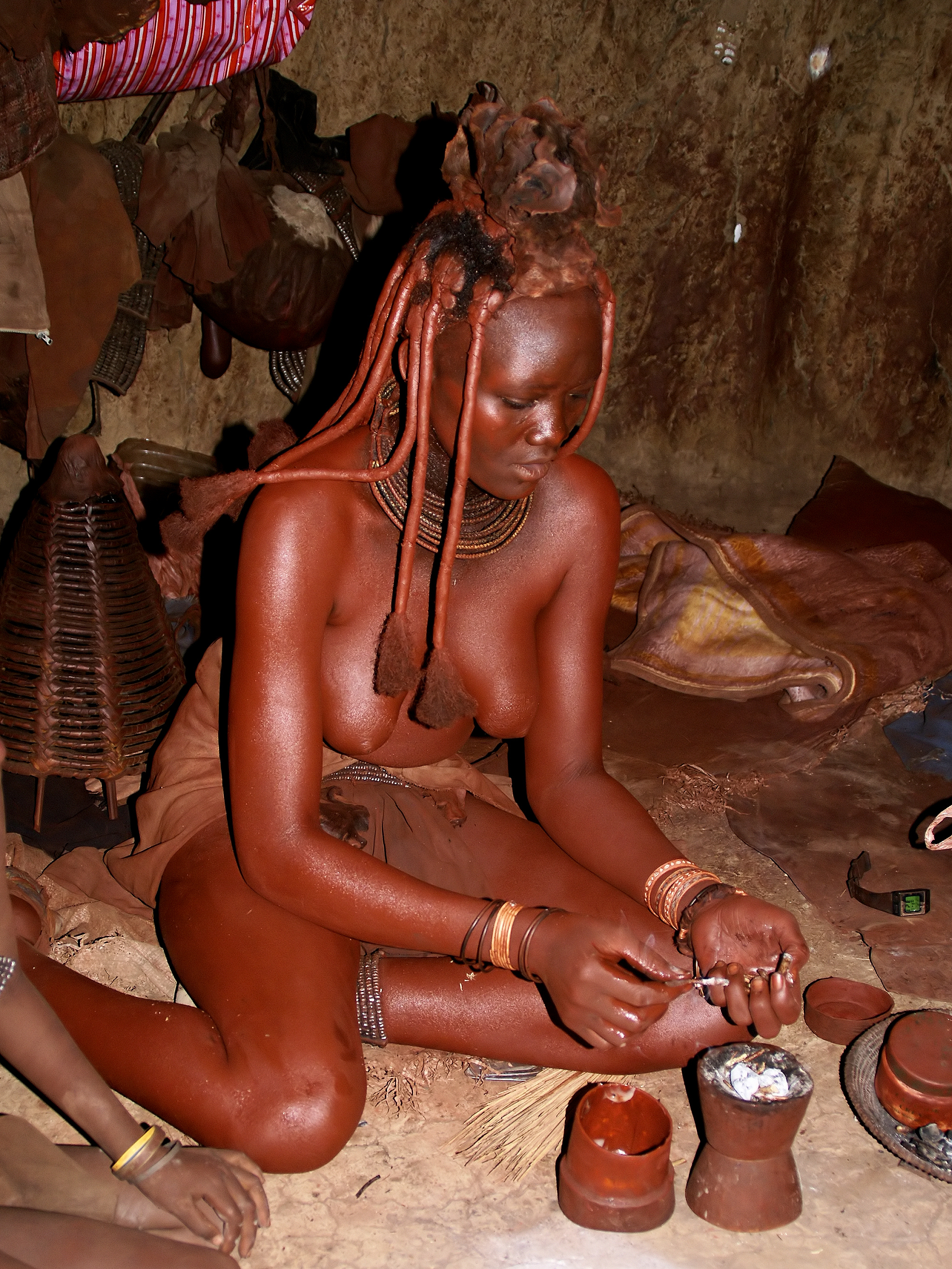
Himba woman covered with traditional red ochre pigment. Traditional body paint symbolic of the earth and of blood, and also worn for protection from the sun.

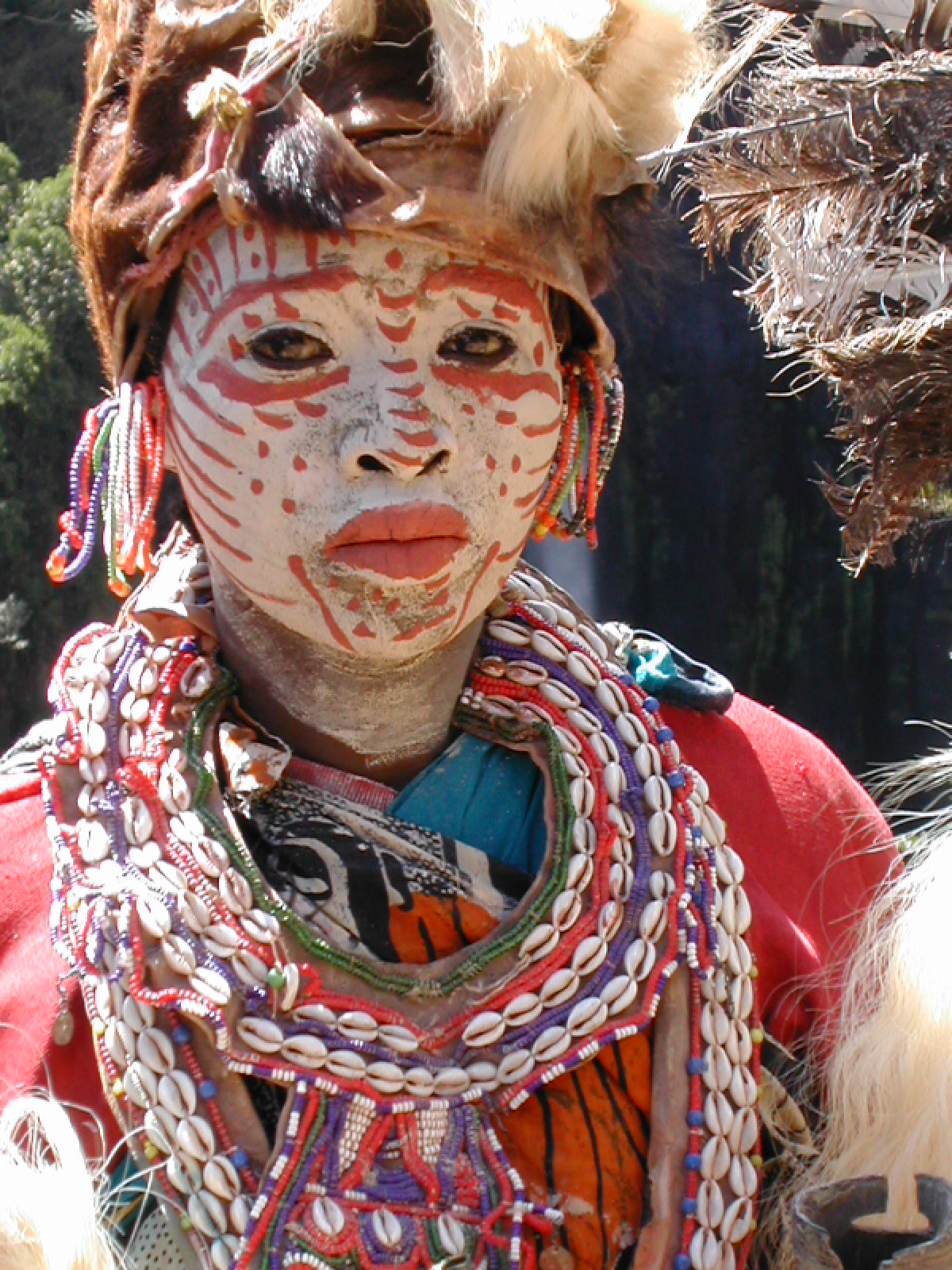
A Kĩkũyũ woman in traditional dress. Ceremonial face painting.

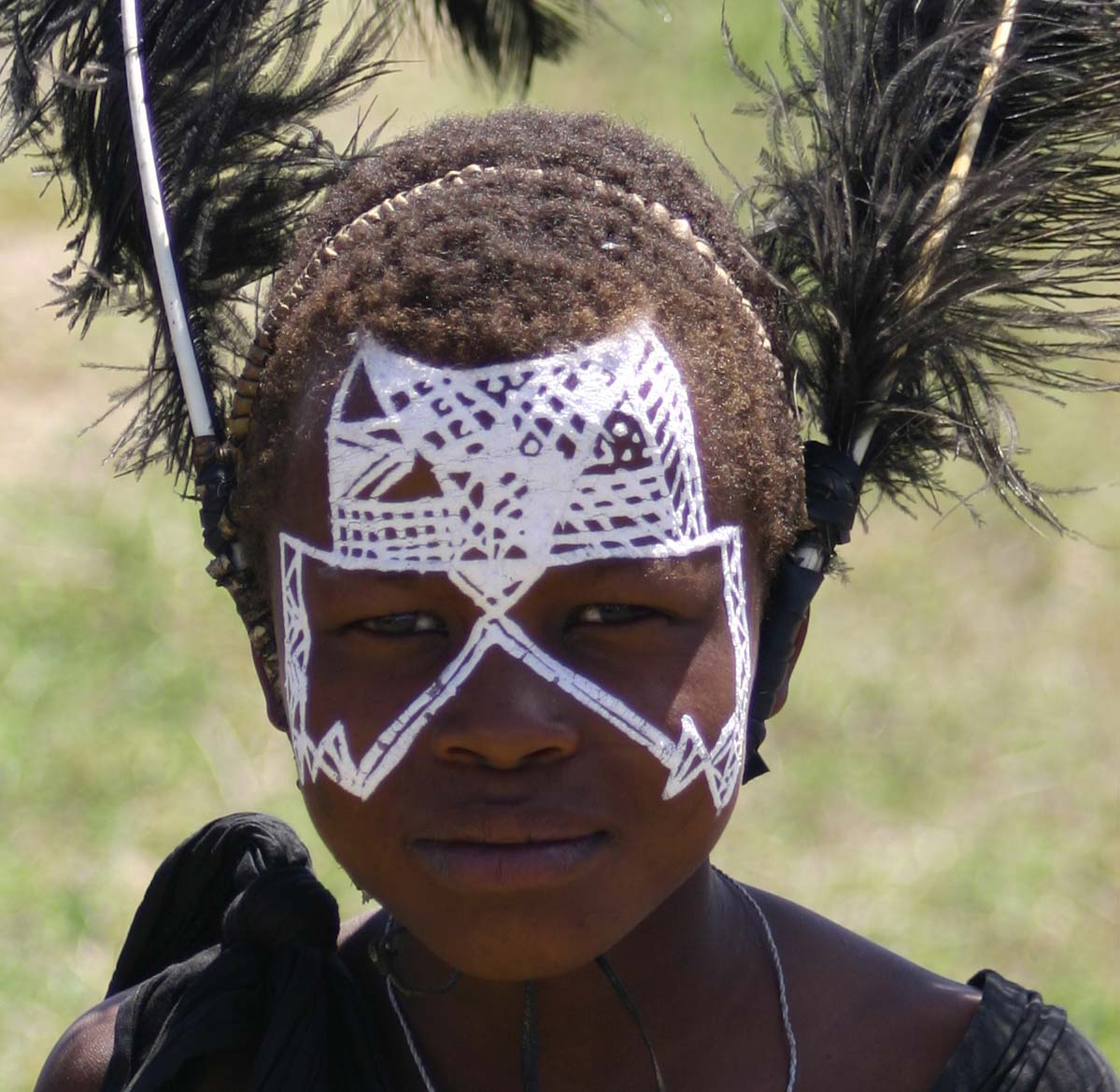
Young Maasai Warrior, with head-dress and face painting.

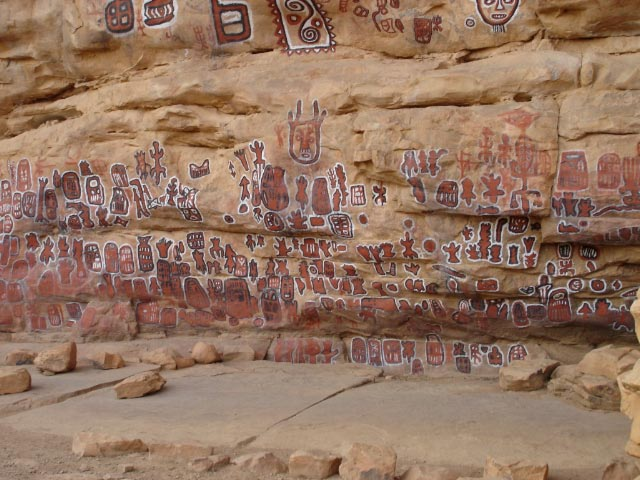
Dogon, circumcision cave, with paintings Mali c. contemporary

== Sudanese ==
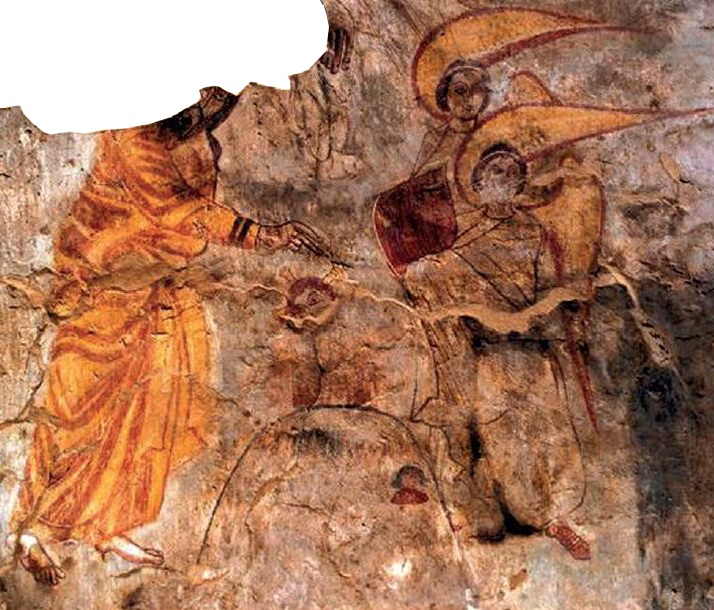
Baptism of Christ on a medieval Nubian painting from Old Dongola

The Kingdom of Kush in ancient Nubia (i.e. modern Sudan), bordering Ancient Egypt, produced a wide variety of arts, including wall paintings and painted objects. At the Sudanese site of Kerma, center of the Kerma culture that predated the Kingdom of Kush, a circa 1700 BC fragmentary painting from a royal tomb depicts a sailing ship and houses with ladders that are similar to scenes in reliefs from the reign of Egyptian queen Hatshepsut (c. 1479–1458 BC). The ancient tradition of wall paintings, first described by Abu Salih during the 12th century AD, continued into the period of medieval Nubia.

== Ethiopian ==
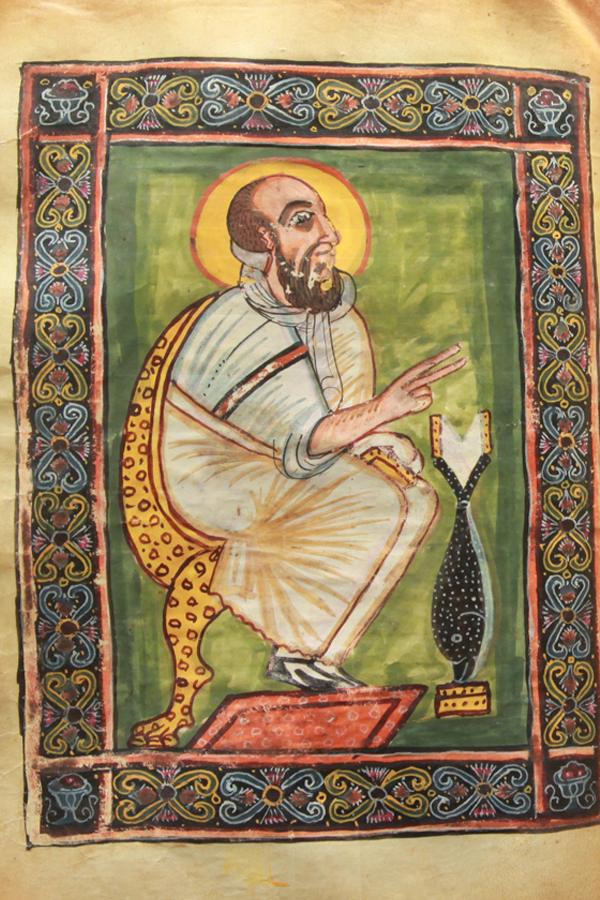
An Ethiopian illuminated Evangelist portrait of Mark the Evangelist, from the Ethiopian Garima Gospels, 6th century AD, Kingdom of Aksum

The Christian tradition of painting in Ethiopia dates back to the 4th century AD, during the ancient Kingdom of Aksum. During their exile to Axum, the 7th-century followers of Muhammad described paintings decorating the Church of Our Lady Mary of Zion. However, the earliest surviving examples of church paintings in Ethiopia come from the church of Debre Selam Mikael in the Tigray Region, dated to the 11th century AD. Ethiopian paintings in illuminated manuscripts predate the earliest surviving church paintings. For instance, the Ethiopian Garima Gospels of the 4th-6th centuries AD contain illuminated scenes imitating the contemporary Byzantine illuminated style.

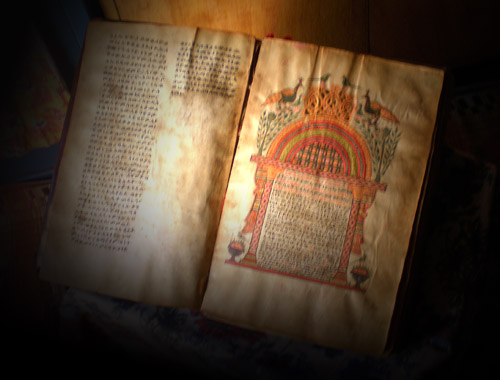
An illuminated Bible from a monastery on Lake Tana, Ethiopia, 12th-13th century AD

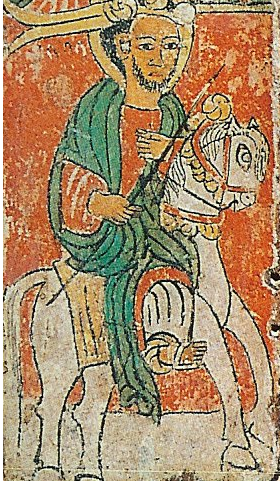
A 15th-century Ethiopian painting of the Solomonic dynasty depicting the Zagwe dynasty ruler Gebre Mesqel Lalibela (r. 1181–1221 AD)

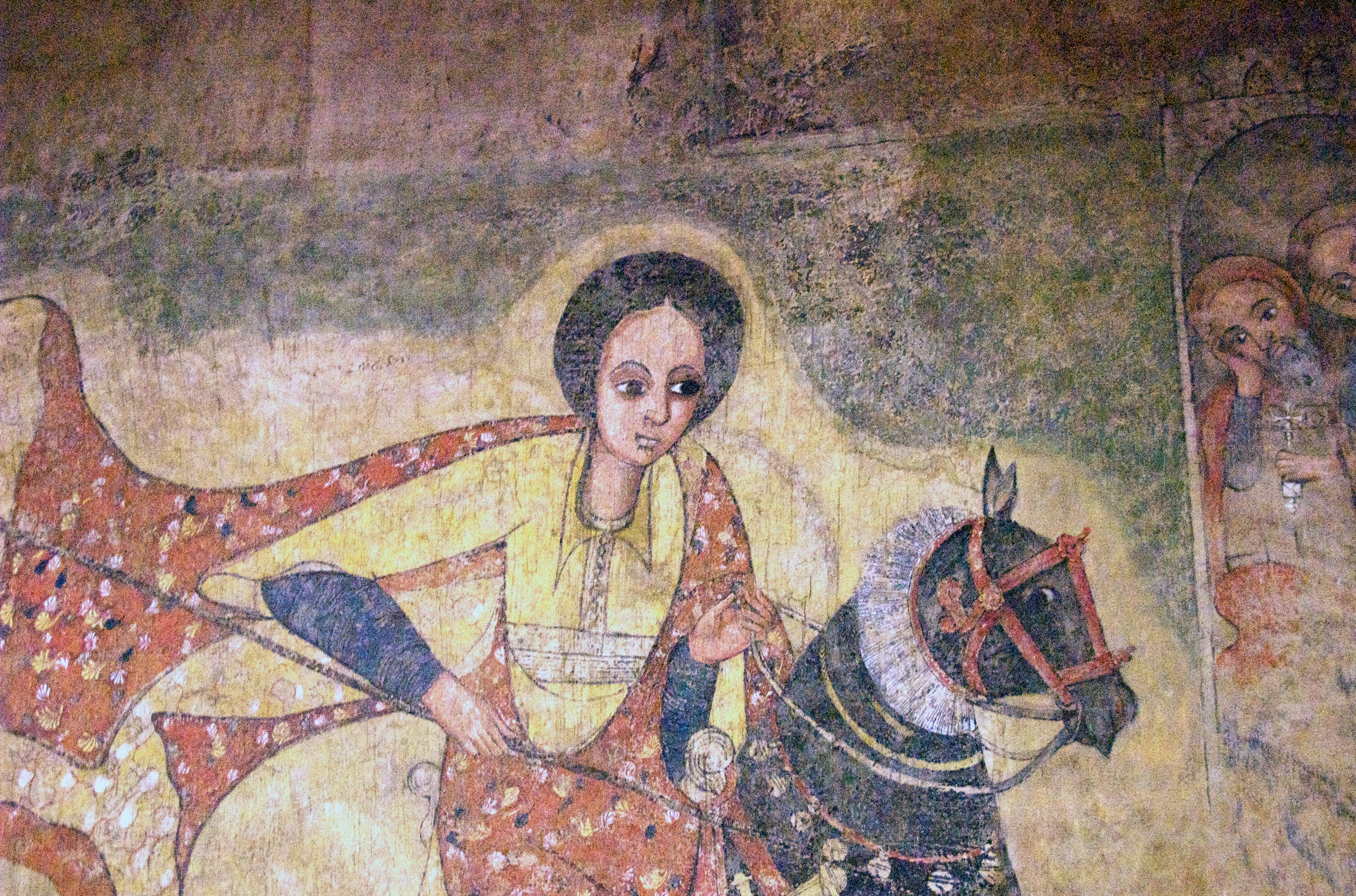
A 17th-century Gondarene-style Ethiopian painting depicting Saint Mercurius, originally from Lalibela, now housed in the National Museum of Ethiopia in Addis Ababa

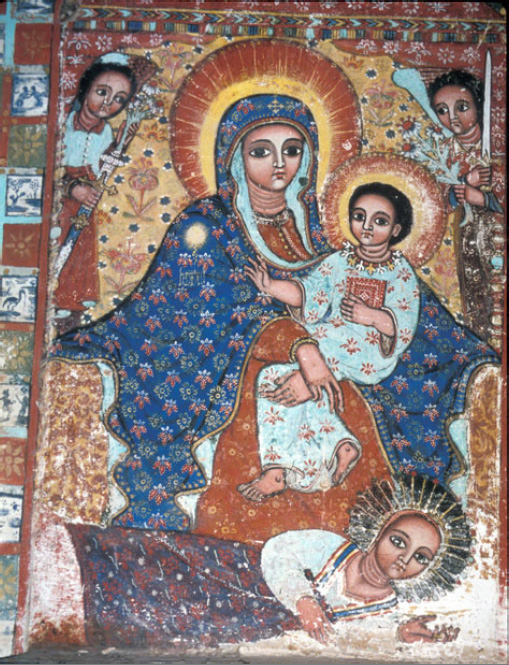
A 1748 portrait of the Ethiopian Empress Mentewab, an important figure of the Zemene Mesafint, prostrating herself before Mary and Jesus, from the Narga Selassie church.

== Influence on Western art ==
At the start of the 20th century, artists like Picasso, Matisse, Paul Gauguin and Modigliani became aware of, and were inspired by, African art. In a situation where the established avant garde was straining against the constraints imposed by serving the world of appearances, African Art demonstrated the power of supremely well organised forms; produced not only by responding to the faculty of sight, but also and often primarily, the faculty of imagination, emotion and mystical and religious experience. These artists saw in African art a formal perfection and sophistication unified with phenomenal expressive power.
