= Merowe =

Merowe may refer to:

- Meroe or Meroë, a town in Sudan, site of over 200 pyramids
- Merowe, Sudan, site of the Merowe Dam
- Merawi (woreda), Amhara Region of Ethiopia
- Merwede or Merwe or Merowe, several interconnected stretches of river in the Netherlands
