= Debub =

Debub (Amharic: ደቡብ), "south" in the Ethio-Semitic languages, may refer to:

- Southern Nations, Nationalities, and Peoples' Region, Ethiopia
  - Debub Bench, a woreda of the SNNP
- Debub Achefer, woreda
- Hawassa University's former name
- South Eastern Zone, Tigray
- Various Zones of Ethiopia, particularly in Amhara region
- Southern region (Eritrea)
