= Pedro Páez =

Spanish Jesuit missionary in Ethiopia (1595–1678)

The Reverend Pedro Páez Jaramillo SJ
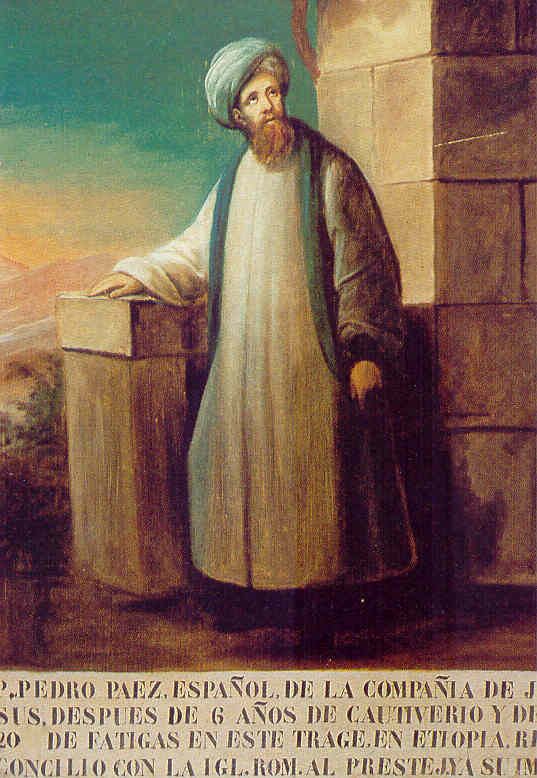
- Undated portrait of Páez
- Born: 1564; Olmeda de la Cebolla, Comarca de Alcalá, Spain
- Died: 20 May 1622 (aged 57); Gorgora, Amhara Province, Ethiopian Empire
- Other name: Pêro Pais (Portuguese)
- Citizenship: Spanish
- Education: University of Alcalá
- Occupations: Jesuit missionary & historian
- Known for: Exploring the Blue Nile and spreading Roman Catholicism in Ethiopia

Ecclesiastical career
- Church: Catholic Church
- Ordained: c. 1588

Pedro Páez Jaramillo, S.J. (Portuguese: Pero Pais; 1564 – 20 May 1622) was a Spanish Jesuit missionary in Ethiopia. Páez is considered by many an expert on Ethiopia as the most effective Catholic missionary in Ethiopia. He is credited as the first European to see and describe the source of the Blue Nile, which he reached on 21 April 1618.

Páez' two-volume História da Etiópia (History of Ethiopia) is regarded by scholars of Ethiopian history as one of the most valuable and accurate works on the contemporary Solomonic Empire and its history (as understood by local sources) up to his own time, particularly as the works of local writers, despite the Ethiopian Orthodox Church's long tradition of literate monastic scholarship and the regular compilation of imperial chronicles, have in large part been lost in the centuries of intermittent conflict that followed or otherwise remained unknown to contemporary scholarship.

== Life ==
Páez was born in 1564 in the village of Olmeda de la Cebolla (now Olmeda de las Fuentes), near Madrid, which until August of that year had been a hamlet of the city of Alcalá de Henares. He was born sixteen years before the union of the Spanish and the Portuguese crowns (1580–1640); that union would determine the span of Páez's missionary activity. In his youth, he studied at the Jesuit college in Belmonte, Cuenca. He was long thought to have then proceeded to study in the University of Coimbra, but recent studies have shown that he did his higher studies at the University of Alcalá. Around that time, he entered the Society of Jesus and was later ordained a priest.

In keeping with his religious vows as a Jesuit, Paez offered himself up for service in the East Indies, and in 1588 was sent to Goa (then part of Portuguese India), where he served at the College of St. Paul operated by the Jesuits in that city. The following year, a direct command of King Philip II of Spain was given for some Jesuits to go to Ethiopia to make contact with the surviving members of a Jesuit mission there, as well as exploring the possible union of the Ethiopian Church with the Catholic Church. With Antonio de Montserrat in command, the two set out for Ethiopia. Upon arrival in Yemen, however, the pair were betrayed by the native officer who had been entrusted with accompanying them on the mission. Handed from one local chieftain to another, they were held captive for nearly seven years, from 1590 to 1596, during which he learned Arabic. During this period he had to travel through the Hadramaut and Rub' al Khali deserts, and tasted coffee in Mokha, being one of the first European to undergo such experiences since Pero da Covilhã in 1488 or Francisco Álvares in 1562. The pair were finally ransomed by the Jesuits in Goa and returned to that city, where they spent some time recuperating from their ordeal. Unfortunately Monserrat never recovered, dying in 1600.

Upon his own recovery, Paez again set out on the mission. He finally arrived at Massawa in 1603, and proceeded to Debarwa where he met the chief of the Portuguese in Ethiopia, John Gabriel, on 11 May, and four days later had made his way to Fremona, the Jesuit base in Ethiopia. Unlike his predecessor, Andre de Oviedo, Paul Henze describes him as "gentle, learned, considerate of the feelings of others". When summoned to the court of the young Emperor (negusä nägäst) Za Dengel, his knowledge of Amharic and Ge'ez, as well as his knowledge of Ethiopian customs impressed the sovereign so much that Za Dengel decided to convert from the Coptic Church to the Roman—although Páez warned him not to announce his declaration too quickly. However, when Za Dengel proclaimed changes in the observance of the Sabbath, Páez retired to Fremona, and waited out the ensuing civil war that ended with the emperor's death.

This caution benefited Páez when Susenyos I assumed the throne in 1607. Susenyos invited him to his court, where the two became friends. Susenyos made a grant of land to Páez on the peninsula of Gorgora on the north side of Lake Tana, where he built a new center for his fellow Jesuits, starting with a stone church, which was dedicated 16 January 1621.

Eventually Páez also converted Susenyos to Catholicism shortly before his own death in 1622. Some of the Catholic churches he designed are still standing, most importantly in the area of Bahir Dar and Gondar, which influenced Ethiopian architecture for the rest of the 17th century. Páez's efforts did not achieve the long-term success that might have been expected because other Jesuits sent to the region afterwards used a rigid approach in their evangelizing methods which led to their expulsion from the territory in 1633.

== Writings ==
Páez's account of Ethiopia, História da Ethiópia, which he completed in 1620, was not published during his lifetime, although Manuel de Almeida borrowed extensively from it to compose his Historia de Etiopía a Alta ou Abassia decades later. After almost three centuries, Páez's history was printed as Volumes II and III of Camillo Beccari's Rerum Aethiopicarum Scriptores occidentales Inedtii (Rome, 1905–17). His work was published in 1945 at Porto in a new edition by Sanceau, Feio and Teixeira, Pêro Pais: História da Etiópia. In Spanish, his complete work was finally published in 2014 with the title Historia de Etiopía. História da Ethiópia has been translated to English by Christopher J. Tribe and published by The Hakluyt Society in 2011.

In addition to translating the Roman Catechism into Ge'ez, Páez is believed to be the author of the treatise De Abyssinorum erroribus.

== See also ==
- Afonso Mendes
- Jerónimo Lobo
- Susenyos I
