= Yesmala =

- Location within Ethiopia
- Coordinates: 11°36′N 36°57′E
- Country: Ethiopia
- Region: Amhara
- Zone: Mirab Gojjam
- Elevation: 2,072 m (6,798 ft)

Population (2005)
  - Total: 5,309
- Time zone: UTC+3 (EAT)

Yesmala is a town in western Ethiopia. Located on the south-western shore of Lake Tana in the Mirab Gojjam Zone of the Amhara Region, this town has a latitude and longitude of 11°36′N 36°57′E with an elevation of 2072 meters above sea level. It was the administrative center of Achefer woreda.

A notable point of interest in Yesmala is the church of Yeldet Giyorgis ("The Daughter of George"). The town is located the midway between Bahir Dar and Kunzila next to Dilamo (small town of Debub Achefer woreda). The big Tana-Beles hydroelectric power plant is located on this route near Kunzila. Debub and semen Acehfer woreda were one woreda (Achefer Woreda) before they split into two. Achefer is a historical district which was first mentioned in the 16th century.

== History ==
One of the earliest mentions of Yesmala is in the Royal chronicle of Emperor Iyasu the Great, where the Emperor stopped twice during his travels in Gojjam in 1702 and the following year. Hormuzd Rassam records that he stopped briefly here 21 January 1866, describing it as the largest village he had seen since his entry into Ethiopia. He was told that Yesmala had been "reckoned one of the most important in the Amhara country, owing to its wealth and to the number of militia which it furnished to the Emperors in time of war."

During the Italian occupation, an Italian official was stationed in Yesmala. The town had a telegraph station and an infirmary.

Yesmala is the home town of the author and journalist Abe Gubegna.

== Demographics ==
Based on figures from the Central Statistical Agency in 2005, this town has an estimated total population of 5,309 of whom 2,497 are men and 2,812 women. The 1994 census reported this town had a total population of 3,027 of whom 1,266 were men and 1,761 were women.

The town has one elementary (called Abe Gubegna elementary school), one junior and one preparatory schools. It is a place where many scientists and wealthy people were/are born but the most neglected. The infrastructure (the road, the telecommunication, clean water supply and other infrastructures) are inadequate and poor. The town has no hospital. This town needs attention. Its calling the Ethiopian government and its people for help.
