= Dek Island =

Island encircled by Lake Tana, Ethiopia

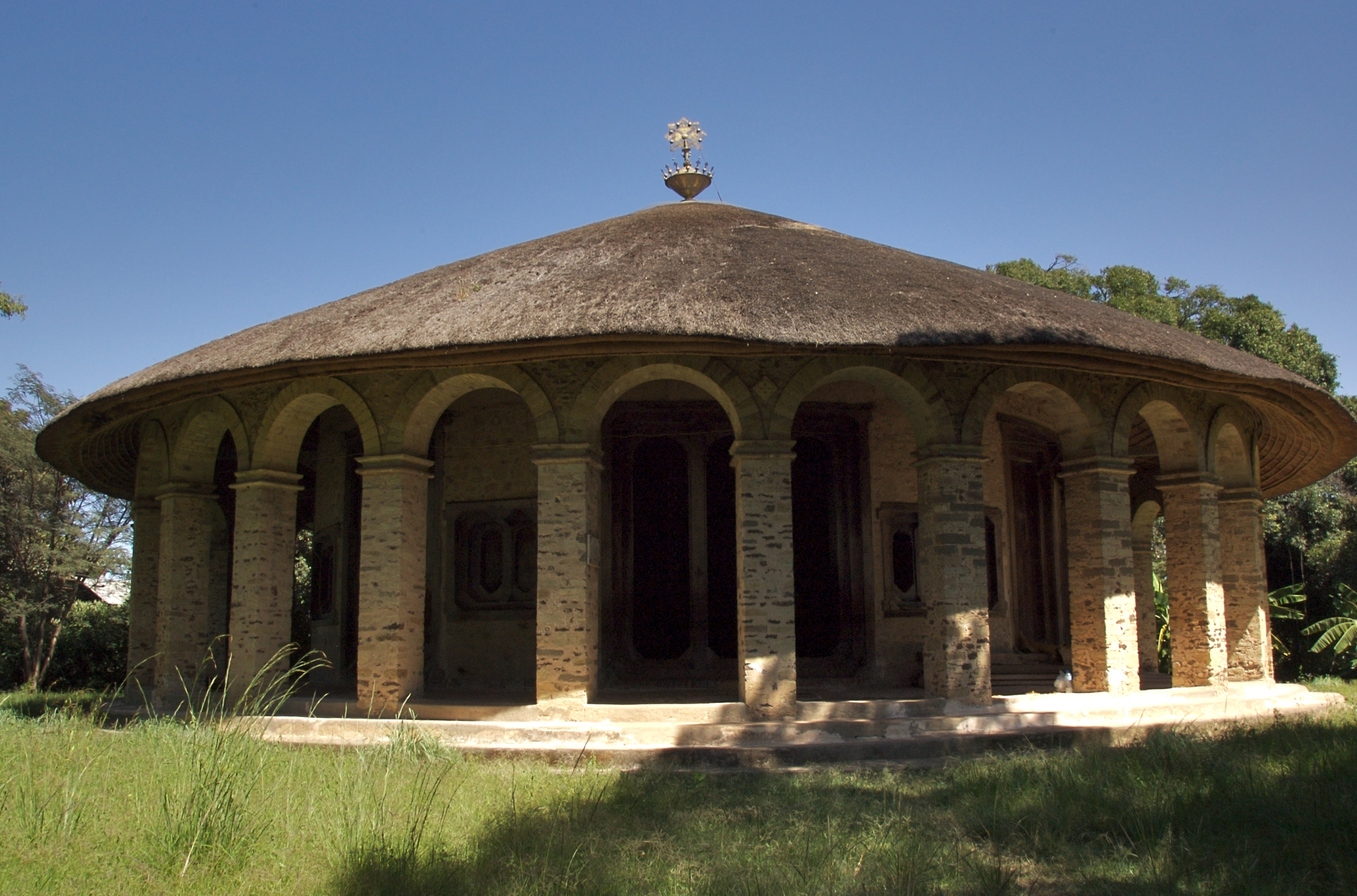
- Church of Narga Selassie
- Interactive map of Dek Island

Geography
- Coordinates: 11°55′N 37°16′E
- Area: 16 km^{2} (6.2 sq mi)

Administration
- Ethiopia
- Region: Amhara
- Zone: Misraq Gojjam
- Woreda: Bahir Dar Zuria

Demographics
- Population: 4,816 (2007)

Dek Island (Amharic: ደቅ ደሴት Däq Däset) is the biggest island (approximately 16 square kilometers in size) on Lake Tana in Ethiopia. It is administratively included in the Bahir Dar Zuria woreda of the Mirab Gojjam Zone. To the southeast of Dek is the much smaller Daga Island.

== Overview ==
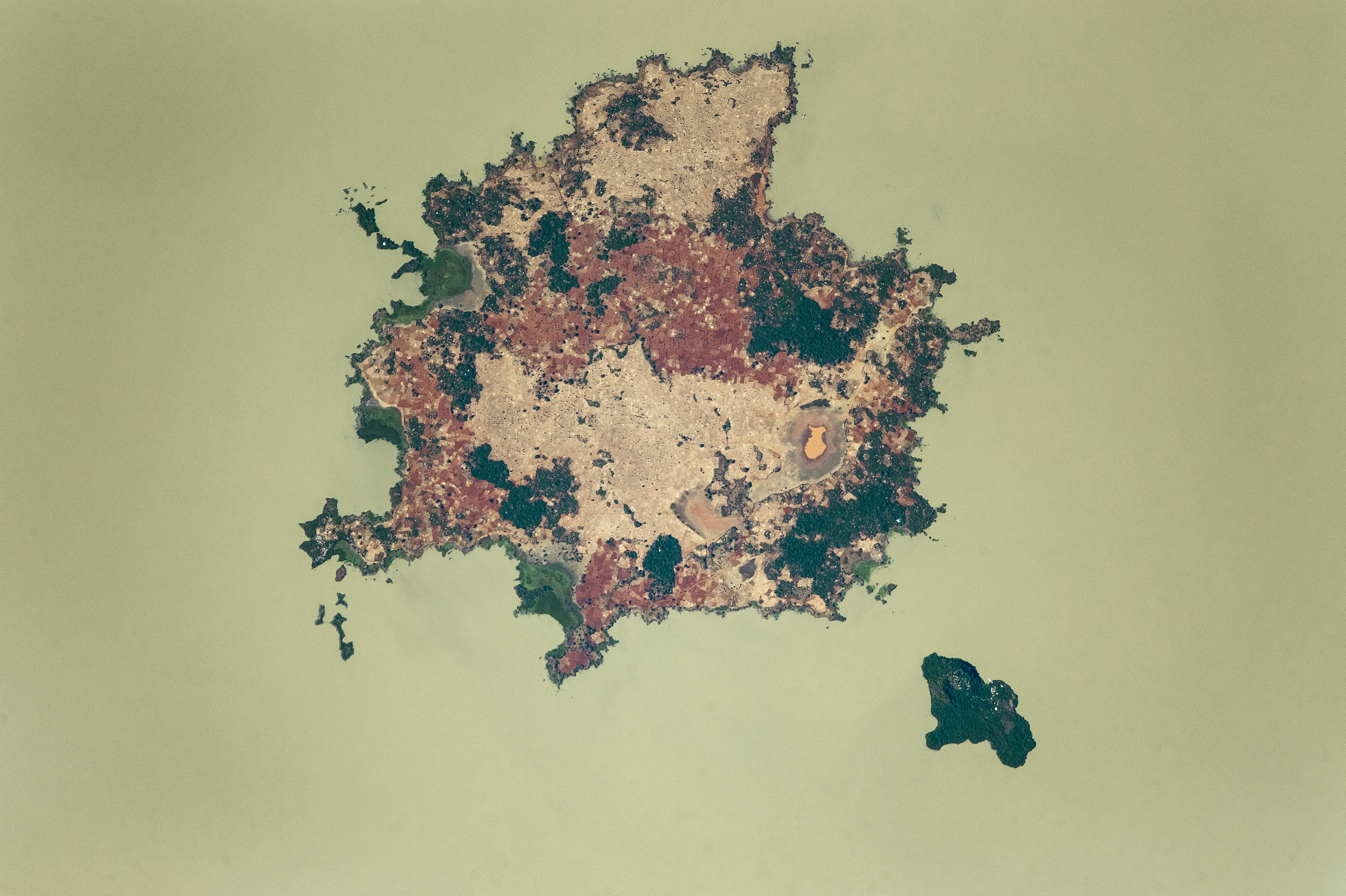
Dek and Daga islands from ISS

Dek Island is home to several monasteries, the best-known being Narga Selassie. Dek is accessible by the ferry that runs from Bahir Dar to Gorgora. Hormuzd Rassam mentions visiting the island in February 1866, describing that at the time it contained four villages with a church attached to each one. Rassam also repeats the story told to him how Dejazmach Kassa (the later Emperor Tewodros II) captured Dek in a single assault.

When R.E. Cheesman visited Dek in 1932 and 1933, he found that it was not strictly "monasterial", but with five churches each with a small village nearby. Cheesman continues his description:

Three-quarters of the island is given up to plough, the chief crops being dagusa and teff, both dwarf millets. Plough-land is divided into plots of about an acre, separated from each other by narrow hedges of scrub forest and big trees. The base of the island is scoriaceous lava in cubes, which are exposed all around the shore and washed by the waves, and identified as vesicular olivine basalt. On the top is a thin layer of red soil derived from the decay of the basalts. The fauna consists chiefly of birds and butterflies that can fly the 5 miles. Animals, as may be expected, are almost absent, though I trapped two kinds of rat; big pythons are numerous in the reed beds and are sometimes found exhausted out at sea and have been known to land on tankwas as unwelcome passengers. Mosquitoes on the islands were very bad.

== Demographics ==
Based on the 2007 national census conducted by the Central Statistical Agency of Ethiopia (CSA), the kebele which includes Dek has a total population of 4,816, of whom 2,503 are men and 2,313 women; a total of 1,218 households were counted in this kebele, resulting in an average of 3.95 persons to a household, which is less than the woreda average of 4.45 persons, and 1,197 housing units. The 1994 national census reported a total population for this woreda of 5,099 people in 1,028 households, of whom 2,683 were men and 2,416 were women.
