= Narga Selassie =

Ethiopian Orthodox church in Amhara Region

Coordinates: 11.91567°N 37.24436°E

Narga Selassie ናርጋ ስላሴ
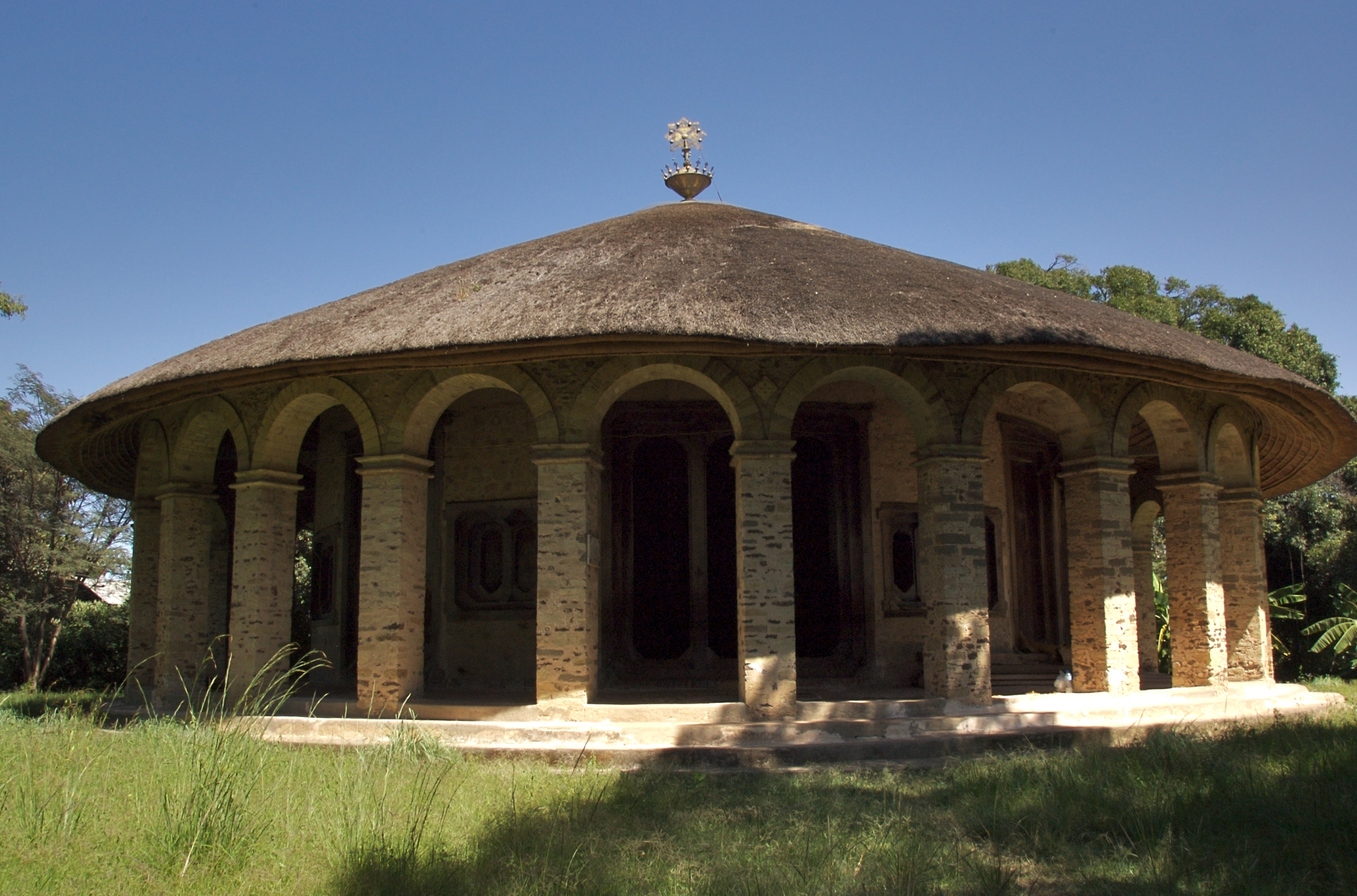
- Main church building

Religion
- Affiliation: Ethiopian Orthodox Tewahedo Church
- Year consecrated: Around the 18th Century
- Status: Active

Location
- Location: Dek Island, Lake Tana, Amhara Region, Ethiopia
- Interactive map of Narga Selassie ናርጋ ስላሴ

Architecture
- Style: Round Church
- Founder: Mentewab

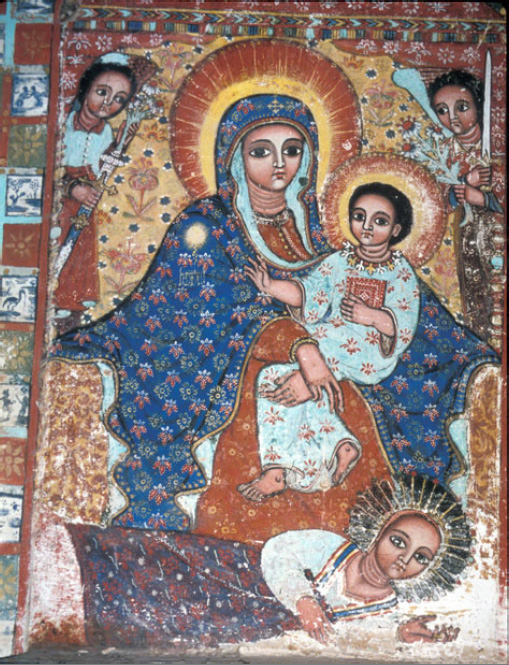
Painting of Mentewab prostrated at the feet of Mary and Jesus from the monastery of Närga Selassie

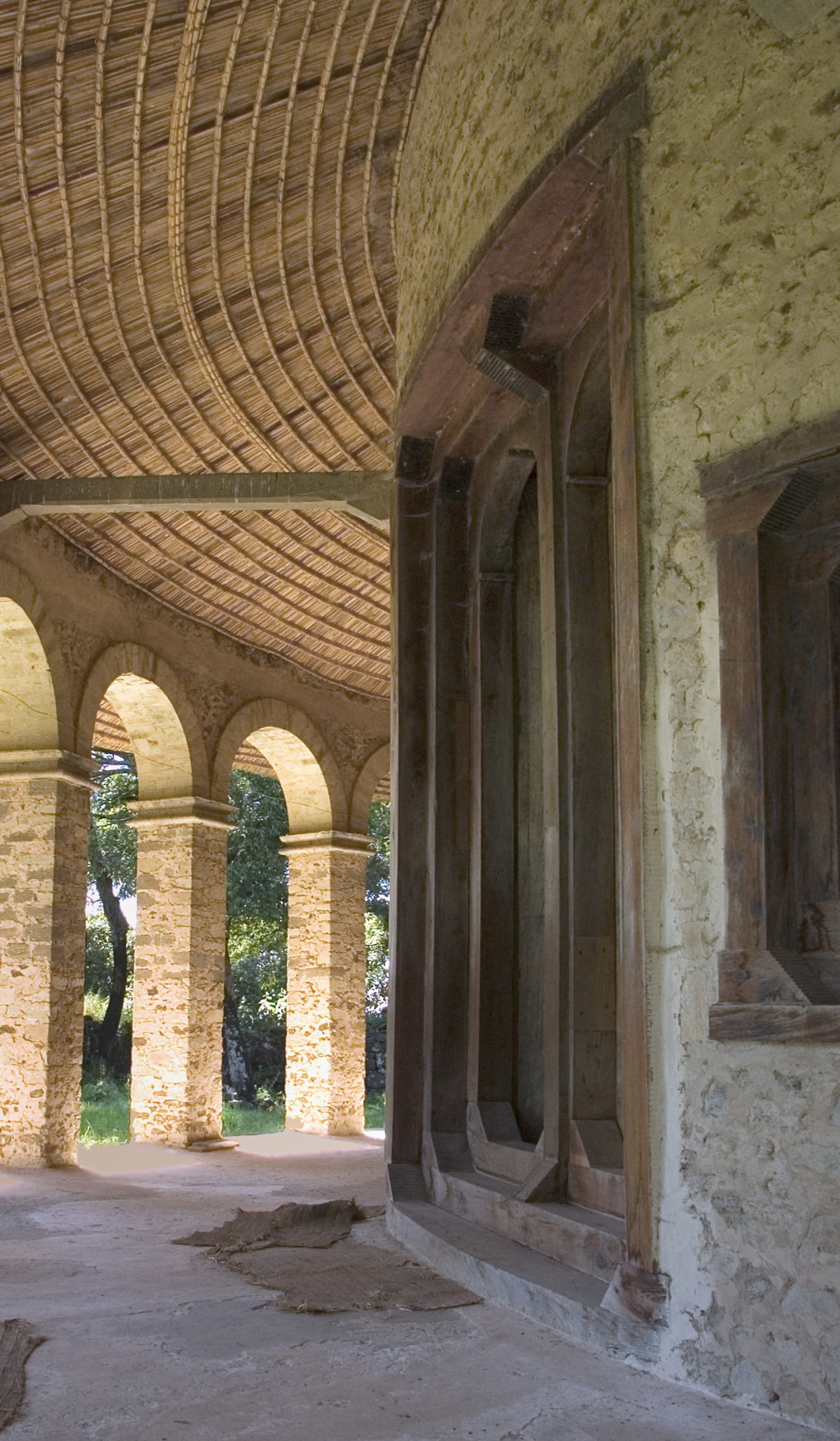
Exterior of Church of Närga Selassie

Narga Selassie is an Orthodox Tewahedo church on the western shores of Dek Island, the largest island of Lake Tana in northern Ethiopia. The name signifies "Trinity of the Rest". "Rest" refers to the place and the shade thereabouts.

The church was constructed by Empress Mentewab in the late 18th century, apparently using as construction material for doors and roof a gigantic sycamore fig tree that stood at the centre of a slight elevation, now the centre of the church. Narga Selassie is fully decorated in the local style. A relief on the main entry portrays the Scottish explorer James Bruce, who visited the capital, Gondar, in the late 18th century.

Narga Selassie was constructed in the classic round architectural tradition of the churches in the Lake Tana area, with the usage of stone both in the peristylium around the church and in the compound walls.

The church is accessed from the lake through a port constructed in 1987, which is connected to Bahir Dar and Gorgora by a state-owned ferry service. The access is in itself a beauty spot with a huge sycamore with long aerial roots descending to the lake and a door tower which forms part of the original construction.
