= Abe Gubegna =

Ethiopian novelist and playwright (1934–1980)

- Born: 1 July 1933 Korench Abo, Achefer, Ethiopian Empire
- Died: 10 February 1980 (aged 46) Addis Ababa, Ethiopia
- Notable works: አልወለድም [I Will Not Be Born] (1962); አንድ ለናቱ [His Mother's Only Child] (1968); Defiance (1975)

Abe Gubegna (Amharic: አቤ ጉበኛ; 1 July 1933 – 10 February 1980) was an Ethiopian novelist, playwright and poet. He published eight novels, five plays, three collections of poetry, and translated several biographies of world leaders as well as other works. Abe mainly wrote in Amharic, but two of his books were written in English.

== Early life and education ==
Abe Gubegna was born in Korench Abo, Achefer woreda, near Bahir Dar. His mother was Yigardu Balay, and his father, Gubegna Ambaye, was a farmer. He was one of 11 children in the family. He went to church schools for 12 years, first in his village and then in Gojjam and Begemder. There he learnt Ge'ez and a style of poetry called qene. Abe then briefly served as an administrator in the church school in his own village, taking the title merigeta. He then attended a government school in Dangila before moving to Addis Ababa. It is unclear whether he completed his secondary education, but in 1958 or 1959 he began work as a journalist at the Ministry of Information before moving to the Ministry of Health.

== Career and major works ==
Abe resigned from government service to try and make a living from writing. This was rare among Amharic writers, and most others maintained other jobs. Between 1956 and 1977 he published over 20 books and numerous newspaper articles. Many of his books sold well and Abe became well known, if controversial. Fellow author Mengistu Lemma regarded him as ‘a hard working writer who has the distinction of having authored the first best sellers in the history of modern Amharic literature’ but his earnings remained low, and he was often in debt. Eventually, he returned to Bahir Dar and started a wholesale textile business, but debts to his printers remained at the time of his death.

=== የሮም አወዳደቅ [The Fall of Rome] (1960) ===
የሮም አወዳደቅ (The Fall of Rome) is Abe's first play, although it was never staged. It portrays how the nobility's extravagance and self-indulgence brings about the fall of Rome through their exploitation of the poor. The play was published two months before the attempted 1960 coup and was clearly written to mirror the Ethiopia that Abe saw under Haile Selassie.

=== የፓትሪስ ሉሙምባ አሳዛኝ አሟሟት [The Tragic Death Patrice Lumumba] (1961) ===
የፓትሪስ ሉሙምባ አሳዛኝ አሟሟት (The Tragic Death of Patrice Lumumba) was Abe's next play. In his preface Abe notes that the publication of several his books was being delayed, which most likely refers to the government censorship, but that he had no patience to wait any longer for this one.

The play condemns the plot against Lumumba in the Republic of the Congo. Abe portrays Lumumba as a freedom fighter and as a martyr to his people, while blaming the racism of Western governments and the complicity of Joseph Kasa-Vubu and Moïse Tshombe for his assassination. The play ends by calling for the execution of Kasa-Vubu and Tshombe. It appeared at a time when Ethiopia was attempting to mediate rifts that the Congolese crisis had created at the Third All African Peoples’ Conference in Cairo and was therefore censored heavily.

=== አልወለድም [I Will Not Be Born] (1962) ===
In 1962 Abe published አልወለድም (I Will Not Be Born). The novel was banned and burnt after 800 copies were sold.

The story is set in the fictional kingdom of Izraelos. The use of a fictional setting, which Abe returns to in many of his works, appears to have been an unsuccessful attempt to avoid government censorship. The unnamed central character, still in his mother's womb, tells her he will not be born into a world without freedom. Despite his efforts, she delivers her baby in hospital, only for him to criticise the doctors for bringing him into a world of suffering.

As an adult he finds employment and incites the workers to strike before being fired by his employers. He goes on to establish an agricultural utopia with his friends, which is destroyed when a government official lays claim to their land. As this occurs the government is overthrown in a military coup. The new government adopts a more progressive approach, before quickly becoming more oppressive than the previous regime. He then becomes involved in a revolution that overthrows the military. He declines a role in the new government and returns to his utopia. But he is soon accused of sedition, arrested and sentenced to death. Before his execution is carried out he declares that he wants to be buried in the open and not in church grounds alongside liars and cheats.

Poet and critic Debebe Seifu considered the novel both politically naïve and lacking in literary style, with its obvious allusions to mid-twentieth century Ethiopia providing its value.

=== The Savage Girl (1964) ===
The Savage Girl is Abe's first and only play in English. It is an allegory of Ethiopian history that takes place over three acts and is partly in verse. It has never been staged.

The Savage Girl was poorly received, with critics citing that too little thought was given to dramatic production and the use of verse was badly constructed. Debebe identified similar flaws in Abe's use of language and production.

=== አንድ ለናቱ [His Mother's Only Child] (1968) ===
In 1968 Abe published አንድ ለናቱ (His Mother's Only Child) a 688-page novel based on the life of Emperor Tewodros II. Abe's interest in Tewodros was far from unique, with novels about the Emperor also written by Makonnen Endelkachew, Berhanu Zerihun and Sahle Sellassie Berhane Mariam.

The novel traces Tewodros’ life from birth until death, with most attention given to the years leading to his coronation. Abe's idealised view of Tewodros is made plain in his introduction, stating: “When all other aspects of Tewodros have been found to be controversial only his bravery has been undisputed". But as with much of his work, this position was also made in opposition to Haile Selassie, who fled the country during a time of crisis, while Tewodros died at the Battle of Magdala. Debebe regarded it as a phenomenal work, albeit one that at times reads like a history textbook.

=== International Writing Program at the University of Iowa (1973) ===
In 1973 Abe attended the International Writing Program at the University of Iowa. He was the third Ethiopian author to attend the program after Daniachew Worku and Solomon Deressa. Peter Nazareth, who participated in the program in the same year, recalled how Abe was hostile towards Americans because he saw their government as supporting the rule of Haile Selassie. Nazareth also recalled how Abe was confrontational towards other writers, including arguments with Kole Omotoso and Ashokamitran, and that he tried to strangle a female Japanese author. Ultimately, Nazareth believed that writers on the program began to fear Abe.

=== Defiance (1975) ===
Defiance portrays the Italian occupation and is Abe's only novel in English. The manuscript was considered for Oxford University Press’ Three Crowns series but was eventually only published for the local market. The novel tells the story of an old Fitawrari and his family during the years of the Italian occupation.

=== ፓለቲካና ፓለቲከኞች [Politics and Politicians] (1976) ===
ፓለቲካና ፓለቲከኞች (Politics and Politicians) is a play published in 1976 or 1977 after it was performed at the Hager Fikir Theatre the previous year. It is a satire depicting what the author saw as the opportunistic behaviour of leftist politicians.

Farada, the protagonist, ridicules the educated elite for their claims that they were the source of the revolution in the country. He decries the jargon that has emerged and appears to indirectly criticise the Derg. The dissatisfaction with both the previous and new government is clear.

== Themes and critical responses ==
Many of Abe's books and newspaper articles were openly critical of the governments of Emperor Haile Selassie and later the political repression of the Derg. He often dealt with themes of social, economic, political and religious oppression and exploitation. This led to repeated government censorship and an attempt to divert him away from writing with the offer of a high-ranking position as a provisional administrator. Some of his books were banned and copies burnt. He was imprisoned for three years following the publication of አልወለድም [I Will Not Be Born] and was later sent into exile to Gore in Illubabor. In total he spent five and a half years in prison and detention.

It was Abe's political position and confrontations with the government that provided much of his fame, with some critics suggesting this has led to his work being overrated. Abe himself believed that: "Since the important matter is what is told and not how it is told, the style of writing should always be regarded as secondary to the theme."

== Later life and death ==
Abe was in America when the Ethiopian Revolution began in 1974, an event that he was an proponent of. After returning to Ethiopia he became disillusioned and spoke out openly against the Derg regime. He began to suffer from alcoholism during his final years and lost much of his inspiration for writing. The reasons for his death in 1980 remain unclear. Some sources refer to a pub brawl and others refer to him dying in a hotel room in mysterious circumstances. He left behind two daughters and a son.

== Publications ==
- Defiance, Oxford University Press (1975) ISBN 0-19-572420-8
- The Savage Girl, Berhanena Selam (1964)
