= Debub Achefer =

District in Amhara Region, Ethiopia

- Woreda
- Flag
- Interactive map of Debub Achefer
- Zone: Mirab Gojjam
- Region: Amhara

Area
  - Total: 1,102.75 km^{2} (425.77 sq mi)

Population (2012 est.)
  - Total: 148,784
  - Density: 134.921/km^{2} (349.443/sq mi)

Debub Achefer or South Acheref, is a woreda in Amhara Region, Ethiopia. It is named for the historic district of Achefer, which was first mentioned in the 16th century. Part of the Mirab Gojjam Zone, Achefer is bordered on the south and west by the Agew Awi Zone, on the north by Semien Acheref, and on the east by Mecha; the Lesser Abay River defines the woreda's eastern boundary. The administrative center is Durbete. Debub Acheref was part of former Achefer woreda. The woreda has a diverse agricultural landscape, dominated by smallholder farming, which plays a crucial role in the local economy and food security. Especially maize cropping is almost critical production line. There is limited road access to harvest animal production, due to it needs short period of time to reach the market.

== Demographics ==
Based on the 2007 national census conducted by the Central Statistical Agency of Ethiopia (CSA), this woreda has a total population of 136,508, of whom 69,239 are men and 67,269 women; 11,776 or 8.63% are urban inhabitants. The majority of the inhabitants practiced Ethiopian Orthodox Christianity, with 98.91% reporting that as their religion, while 1.01% were Muslim.
