= Gonji Kolela (woreda) =

Gonji
- District
- Country: Ethiopia

Gonji is a district of Amhara Region in Ethiopia.

== See also ==
- Districts of Ethiopia
