= Enteromius tanapelagius =

Conservation status
- Least Concern (IUCN 3.1)

Scientific classification
- Domain: Eukaryota
- Kingdom: Animalia
- Phylum: Chordata
- Class: Actinopterygii
- Order: Cypriniformes
- Family: Cyprinidae
- Subfamily: Smiliogastrinae
- Genus: Enteromius
- Species: E. tanapelagius

Binomial name
- Enteromius tanapelagius (Graaf, Dejen, Sibbing & Osse, 2000)

Synonyms
- Barbus tanapelagius

Species of fish

Enteromius tanapelagius is a species of ray-finned fish in the genus Enteromius. It is endemic to Ethiopia.

== Footnotes ==
- Froese, Rainer; Pauly, Daniel (eds.). "Enteromius tanapelagius". FishBase.
