= Adet, Ethiopia =

Adet
- Location in Ethiopia
- Coordinates: 11°16′N 37°29′E
- Country: Ethiopia
- Zone: Mirab Gojjam Zone
- Elevation: 2,216 m (7,270 ft)

Population (2005)
  - Total: 21,117 (est)

Adet (Amharic: አዴት), also known as Adet Medhanialem, is a town in northwestern Ethiopia. Located south of Bahir Dar in the Mirab Gojjam Zone of the Amhara Region (or kilil), this town has a latitude and longitude of 11°16′N 37°29′E with an altitude of 2,216 meters above sea level. It is the largest settlement in Yilmana Densa woreda. Adet, Gojjam, Ethiopia

== History ==
Records at the Nordic Africa Institute website provide details of the primary school in Adet in 1968. In January 1985, proposals were invited for the construction of an agricultural research station at Adet.

== Demographics ==
Based on figures from the Central Statistical Agency in 2005, this town has an estimated total population of 21,117 of whom 10,508 are men and 10,609 are women. The 1994 census reported this town had a total population of 12,178 of whom 5,529 were men and 6,649 were women.
