= Olmeda de las Fuentes =

- Municipality
- Flag Coat of arms

- Location in Spain.
- Coordinates: 40°22′8″N 4°13′14″W
- Country: Spain
- Autonomous community: Community of Madrid
- Province: Madrid
- Comarca: Comarca de Alcalá

Government
  - Mayor: Miguel Angel Alonso Juliá

Area
  - Total: 16.73 km^{2} (6.46 sq mi)
- Elevation: 794 m (2,605 ft)

Population (2025-01-01)
  - Total: 429
  - Density: 25.6/km^{2} (66.4/sq mi)
- Demonym: Olmedeños
- Time zone: UTC+1 (CET)
  - Summer (DST): UTC+2 (CEST)

Olmeda de las Fuentes is a municipality of the Community of Madrid, Spain.
