= Mecha (woreda) =

District in Amhara Region, Ethiopia

Coordinates: 11°30′N 37°00′E

Mecha Zuria
- Woreda
- Flag
- Interactive map of Mecha Zuria
- Zone: Mirab Gojjam
- Region: Amhara

Area
  - Total: 1,481.64 km^{2} (572.06 sq mi)

Population (2012 est.)
  - Total: 317,963
  - Density: 214.602/km^{2} (555.817/sq mi)

Mecha (formerly known as Merawi) is a woreda in Amhara Region, Ethiopia. The name, Mecha, is taken from the name for a subdivision of the province of Gojjam. Part of the Mirab Gojjam Zone, Mecha is bordered on the south by Sekela, on the southwest by the Agew Awi Zone, on the west by the Lesser Abay River which separates it from Debub Achefer and Semien Achefer, on the northeast by Bahir Dar Zuria, and on the east by Yilmana Densa. Towns in Mecha include Merawi and Wetet Abay.

Bodies of water in this woreda include Tingiti, which is located in a volcanic crater near the Lesser Abay; R.E. Cheesman believed he was the first European to see this body of water when he was shown it in November 1932.

== Demographics ==
Based on the 2007 national census conducted by the Central Statistical Agency of Ethiopia (CSA), this woreda has a total population of 292,080, an increase of 36.55% over the 1994 census, of whom 147,611 are men and 144,469 women; 22,677 or 7.76% are urban inhabitants. With an area of 1,481.64 square kilometers, Mecha has a population density of 197.13, which is greater than the Zone average of 158.25 persons per square kilometer. A total of 66,107 households were counted in this woreda, resulting in an average of 4.42 persons to a household, and 64,206 housing units. The majority of the inhabitants practiced Ethiopian Orthodox Christianity, with 98.91% reporting that as their religion.

The 1994 national census reported a total population for this woreda of 244,943 in 49,098 households, of whom 123,646 were men and 121,297 were women; 12,278 or 5.01% of its population were urban dwellers. The largest ethnic group reported in Merawi was the Amhara (99.91%). Amharic was spoken as a first language by 99.96%. The majority of the inhabitants practiced Ethiopian Orthodox Christianity, with 98.84% reporting that as their religion, while 1.09% were Muslim.
