= Bahir Dar Zuria =

District in Bahir Dar, Amhara Region, Ethiopia

Coordinates: 11°15′N 37°10′E

Bahir Dar Zuria ባሕር ዳር ዙሪያ
- Woreda
- Flag
- Interactive map of Bahir Dar Zuria
- Zone: Mirab Gojjam
- Region: Amhara Region

Area
  - Total: 1,443.37 km^{2} (557.29 sq mi)

Population (2012 est.)
  - Total: 196,766
  - Density: 136.32/km^{2} (353.08/sq mi)

Bahir Dar Zuria (Amharic: ባሕር ዳር ዙሪያ "Greater Bahir Dar Area") is a woreda in Amhara Region, Ethiopia. Part of the Mirab Gojjam Zone, this woreda is bordered on the south by Yilmana Densa, on the southwest by Mecha, on the northwest by the Gilgel Abay River which separates it from Semien Achefer, on the north by Lake Tana, on the shores of Lake Tana situates the city and special zone of Bahir Dar, and on the east by the Abay River which separates it from the Debub Gondar Zone.

Bahir Dar Zuria includes the forested Zege Peninsula, known for its numerous medieval churches, of which the best known is Ura Kidane Mehret, and associated monasteries. Other points of interest include the Tis Issat falls, and Dilde, better known as the Portuguese Bridge, over the Abay at Alata, about half a mile below the falls. A survey of the land in this woreda shows that 21% is arable or cultivable, 9% pasture, 8% forest or shrubland, 36% covered with water, and the remaining 26% is considered degraded or other. Teff, corn, sorghum, cotton and sesame are important cash crops.

== Demographics ==
A 2012 estimate puts the population at 196,766. This gives a population density of 136.32 people per square kilometer (353.08 people per square mile), given its area of 1,443.37 square kilometers (557.29 square miles), lower than the West Gojjam Zone average of 172.51 people per square kilometer (446.81 people per square mile).

Based on the 2007 national census conducted by the Central Statistical Agency of Ethiopia (CSA), this woreda has a total population of 182,730, of whom 93,642 are men and 89,088 women; no urban inhabitants were reported. With an area of 1,443.37 square kilometers, Bahir Dar Zuriya has a population density of 126.60, which is less than the Zone average of 158.25 persons per square kilometer. A total of 40,893 households were counted in this woreda, resulting in an average of 4.47 persons to a household, and 40,097 housing units. The 1994 national census reported a total population for this woreda of 198,284 in 40,391 households, of whom 101,939 were men and 96,345 were women; 8,045 or 4.06% of its population were urban dwellers.

IN 1994 the largest ethnic group reported in Bahir Dar Zuria was the Amhara (99.91%). Amharic was spoken as a first language by 99.93%. The majority of the inhabitants practiced Ethiopian Orthodox Christianity, with 98.22% reporting that as their religion, while 1.74% were Muslim. This had changed somewhat by 2007, with 99.7% reporting Ethiopian Orthodox Christianity as their religion.
