= Yilmana Densa =

District in Amhara Region, Ethiopia

Coordinates: 11°30′N 37°20′E

Yilmana Densa ይልማና ዴንሳ
- Woreda
- Flag
- Interactive map of Yilmana Densa
- Zone: Mirab Gojjam
- Region: Amhara

Area
  - Total: 926.59 km^{2} (357.76 sq mi)

Population (2012 est.)
  - Total: 234,269
  - Density: 252.83/km^{2} (654.82/sq mi)

Yilmana Densa (Amharic: ይልማና ዴንሳ "Yilma and Densa" formerly known as Adet) is one of the woredas in the Amhara Region of Ethiopia. Part of the Mirab Gojjam Zone, Yilmana Densa is bordered on the south by Kuarit, on the southwest by Sekela, on the west by Mecha, on the north by Bahir Dar Zuria, on the east by the newly established district Gonji kolela. The major town in Yilmana Densa is Adet. The district is well known for its potential in teff production and known as the ocean homeland of Magna teff.

== Demographics ==
Based on the 2007 national census conducted by the Central Statistical Agency of Ethiopia (CSA), this woreda has a total population of 214,852, of whom 107,010 are men and 107,842 women; 19,169 or 8.92% are urban inhabitants. The majority of the inhabitants practiced Ethiopian Orthodox Christianity, with 98.19% reporting that as their religion, while 1.76% were Muslim.

The 1994 national census reported a total population for this woreda of 244,803 in 48,521 households, of whom 122,135 were men and 122,668 were women; 12,178 or 4.97% of its population were urban dwellers. The largest ethnic group reported in Adet was the Amhara (99.94%). Amharic was spoken as a first language by 99.96%. The majority of the inhabitants practiced Ethiopian Orthodox Christianity, with 98.16% reporting that as their religion, while 1.83% were Muslim.
