= Gorgora =

Town and peninsula in Amhara Region, Ethiopia

Gorgora ጎርጎራ
- Town and peninsula
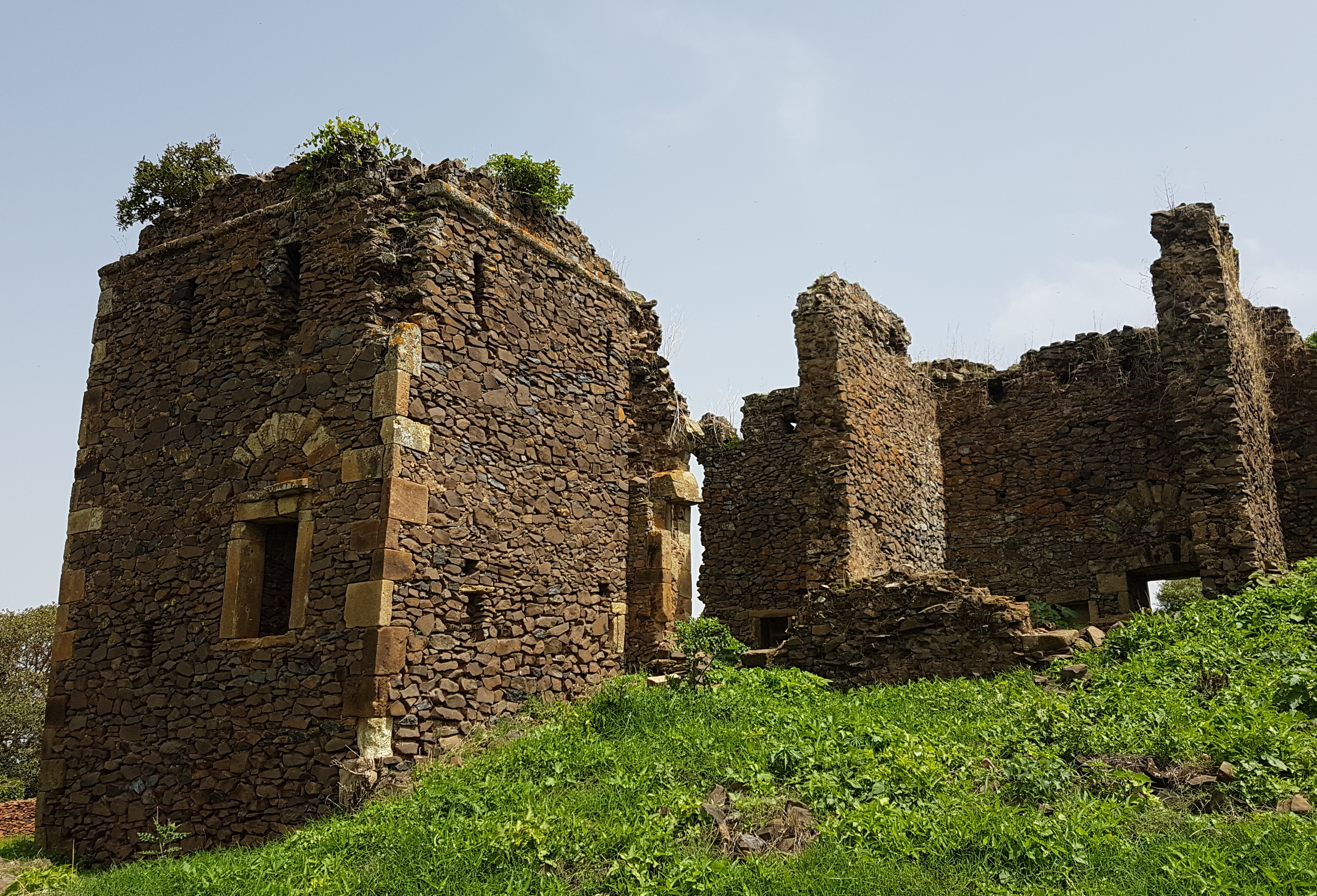
- Former Jesuit residence in New Gorgora

- Location within Ethiopia Location within the Horn of Africa Location within Africa
- Coordinates: 12°14′N 37°18′E
- Country: Ethiopia
- Region: Amhara
- Zone: Semien (North) Gondar

Population (2005)
  - Total: 4,783 (est)
- Time zone: UTC+3 (EAT)

Gorgora (Amharic: ጎርጎራ Gōrgōrā, also, especially formerly, ጐርጐራ Gʷargʷarā, modern pronunciation Gʷergʷerā) is a town and peninsula in northwestern Ethiopia. It is located south of Gondar on the north shore of Lake Tana, in the Semien Gondar Zone of the Amhara Region. Gorgora has a latitude and longitude of 12°14′N 37°18′E.

Gorgora refers to a small peninsula jutting into Lake Tana as well as to a small village hosting a harbor. The peninsula was important in the past as the site of an important Jesuit residence: "Old" Gorgora was located 5 km northeast, inland from Maryam Gimb, which was called [New] Gorgora, and 5 km west of Debre Sina and its churches (usually not considered a town in its own right). Other notable landmarks include the monastery of Mandaba, located at the headlands of Gorgora peninsula. Robert Ernest Cheesman visited Mandaba in 1932 and described the monastery as being enclosed by a high wall and no woman is allowed inside its gate. There are 150 residents, monks, the monastery is governed by an Abbot who has the power of putting refractory monks in chains, and is all powerful in his own monastery. Cheesman was told that if a man fleeing from justice rings the monastery bell and is given sanctuary, he is safe from even the highest person in the land.

== History ==
The name Gorgora is first mentioned during the reign of Emperor Baeda Maryam I. A church and a monastery are found in the nearby island of Gelila Zakarias, whilst the peninsula is the site of the monastery of Mandaba and the important churches of Medoene Alam and Debre Sina.

Gorgora gained prominence under the Jesuits as a missionary residence and the site of a major Catholic church. The origins of this foundation lay in a temporary land grant to the Latin missionaries by Emperor Susenyos I in 1607. A community of "Portuguese" had already been granted lands nearby by his predecessors, Emperor Sarsa Dengel and Emperor Yaqob. Gorgora became an important missionary center alongside Fremona in Tigray. Gorgora housed a "bilingual" seminary where education was provided in both Portuguese and Amharic, primarily serving the offspring of the Portuguese. It rivaled Fremona in student numbers, with records showing around 34 students in 1614 and approximately 50 a decade later.

Initially, Jesuits officiated in a church made of straw and adorned with European images, including the Roman Virgin of St. Lucas from Santa Maria Maggiore and a portrait of Ignatius of Loyola. In 1618, construction began on a new church designed by Pedro Paez, completed in 1621 and dedicated to the Virgin of the Assumption. Their lands expanded, including an island where they took refuge during conflicts. They received generous royal funding, and in return, they acted as "royal clergy". By 1617, Susenyos and some noblemen reportedly began to partake in Catholic communion in secret. Gorgora, as the residence of the head of the mission, became the focal point of a network of Jesuit posts in Dembiya and Gojjam, including Azezo, Danqaz and Emfraz. It was also a center of intellectual activity, where Pedro Paez wrote his Historia, and Jesuits Luis de Azevedo and Antonio Fernandez collaborated with Abba Akala Kristos to translate Spanish Jesuit treatises into Amharic.

Around 1621, Susenyos I instructed the Jesuits to build a royal palace a few kilometers southwest, at a strategically better location where his katama (royal camp) may have already been situated. A royal document suggests construction began in 1618. By 1622, the Jesuits moved from "Old" Gorgora to this new location, which became known as New Gorgora. Susenyos I enriched it with additional lands, and it expanded into a complex featuring residences, water cisterns, walls, and a castle. Between 1627 and 1629, a grand church of lime and stone, lavishly decorated, was built under the direction of Jesuit brother João Martins. Its ruins exhibit distinct Jesuit overseas architectural features, including a single-story nave with fine floral and geometric designs. In New Gorgora, the Jesuits performed elaborate celebrations and theatrical plays, briefly bringing their global missionary culture to Ethiopia.

After the restoration of Orthodoxy, New Gorgora was the first Jesuit residence to be abandoned and its buildings and religious images were destroyed. In 1665, Emperor Fasilides ordered the burning of "books of the Franks," which may have included an important Catholic library. Before their expulsion, due to the region’s unhealthy climate, the Christian court had gradually relocated northward to higher-altitude sites such as Danqaz and Gondar.

Gorgora formed part of the defenses of the Italian last stand, under General Guglielmo Nasi, around Gondar. In October 1941, the Italians had one battalion at Gorgora; within a month the garrison was 1500 strong. Most ruins of the structures at New Gorgora that the Jesuits were destroyed following an earthquake in the 1950s. In 1960 the public health service set up a center in this town, one of the first four in the countryside of Ethiopia. Gorgora was selected due to its proximity to the Public Health College in Gondar.

The water hyacinth plant was rapidly invading Lake Tana around Gorgora in 2018.

== Demographics ==
Based on figures from the Central Statistical Agency in 2005, Gorgora has an estimated total population of 4783, of whom 2283 are men and 2500 are women. The 1994 census reported this town had a total population of 2,768 of whom 1,201 were men and 1,567 were women.
