= Gilgel Abay =

River in Ethiopia

Gilgel Abay Lesser Abay
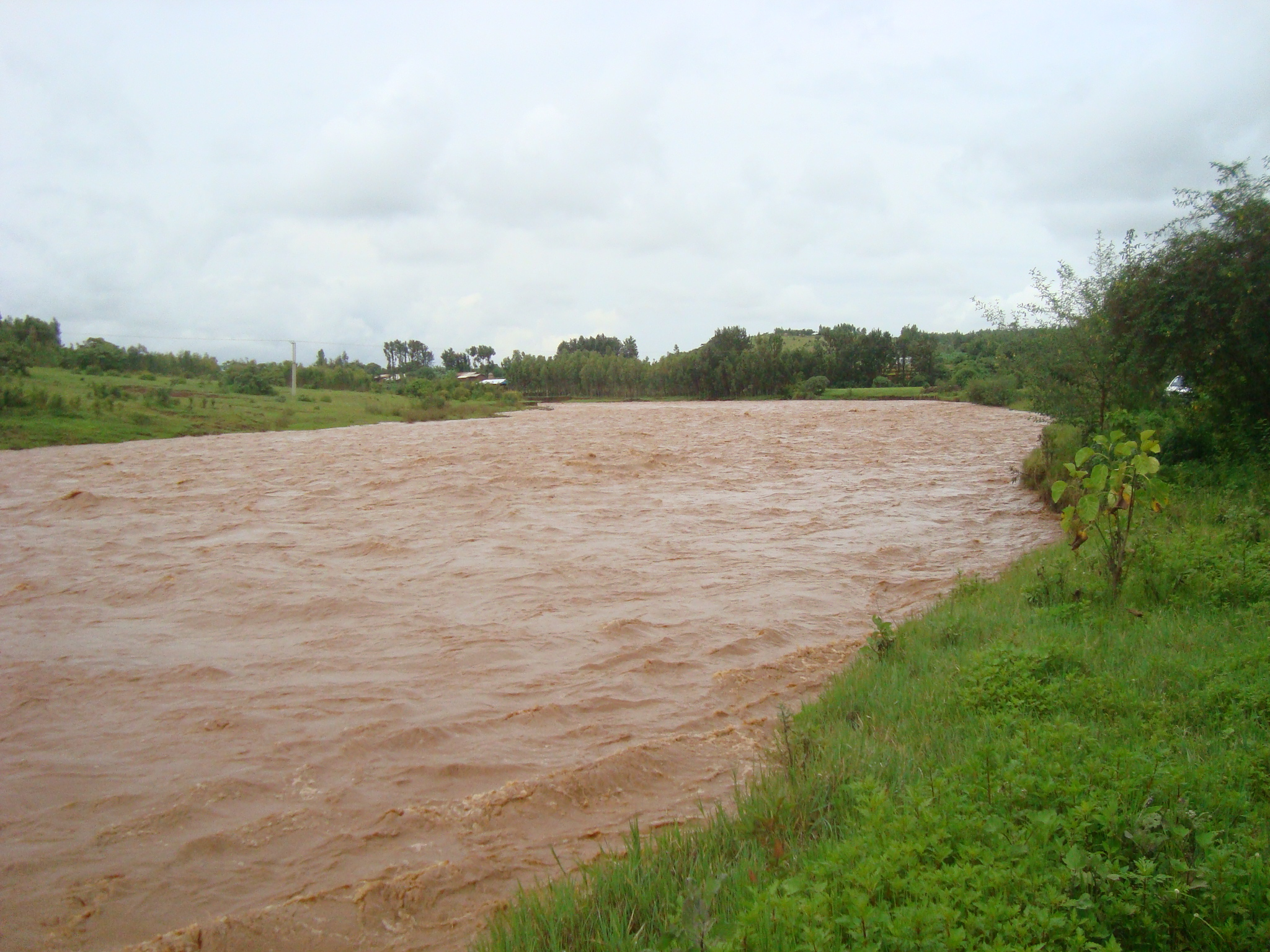
- Gilgel Abay at BIkolo, during flood

- Map of Lake Tana, showing rivers flowing into it
- Etymology: Literally "Lesser Nile"
- Native name: ግልገል አባይ (Amharic)

Location
- Country: Ethiopia
- Region: Amhara
- Zone: West Gojjam

Physical characteristics
- Source
  - location: Near Gish Abay
  - coordinates: 11.01147°N 37.15229°E
  - elevation: 2,454 m (8,051 ft)
- Mouth: Lake Tana
  - location: 12.5 km (7.8 mi) SE of Kunzila
  - coordinates: 11.798679°N 37.125324°E
  - elevation: 1,786 m (5,860 ft)
- Length: 154.5 km (96.0 mi)
- Basin size: 3,887 km^{2} (1,501 sq mi)
- Width
  - maximum: 71 m (233 ft)

Basin features
- Progression: Lake Tana → Blue Nile → Nile → Mediterranean Sea
- River system: Nile Basin
- Population: 1,220,000

The Gilgel Abay (Amharic: ግልገል አባይ, Gǝlgäl Abbay), or Lesser Abay, is a river of central Ethiopia. Rising in the mountains of Gojjam, it flows northward to empty into south-western Lake Tana in a bird's-foot delta. Tributaries of the Gilgel Abbay include the Ashar, Jamma, Kelti and the Koger. It was regarded as the true source of the Nile for a long time and the Jesuit priest Pedro Paez visited it in 1618. The name Gilgel Abbay means Lesser Nile, as Abbay is the name for the Blue Nile.

== Characteristics ==
It is a meandering river, with a catchment area of 3,887 km^{2} (1,501 sq mi). It is 71 meters wide near its mouth, with a slope gradient of 0.7 m/km. The average diameter of the bed material is 0.37 mm (sand).

== Sediment transport ==
The river carries annually 22,185 tonnes of bedload and 7.6 million tonnes of suspended sediment to Lake Tana.

== See also ==
- List of Ethiopian rivers
