= Lake Tana =

Largest lake in Ethiopia and major source of Blue Nile

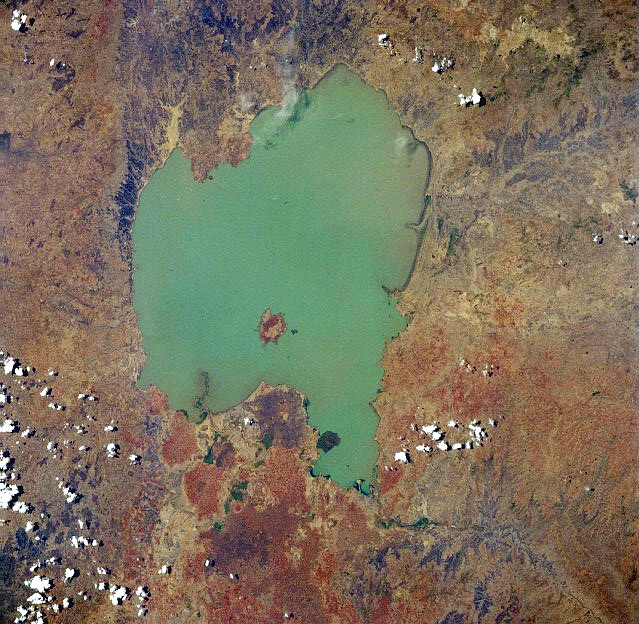
- West-looking photograph of Lake Tana from space (April 1991)

- Location within Ethiopia
- Location: East Africa
- Coordinates: 12°0′N 37°15′E
- Primary inflows: Gilgel Abay, Kilti River, Magech River, Reb River, Gumara River
- Primary outflows: Blue Nile
- Basin countries: Ethiopia
- Max. length: 84 km (52 mi)
- Max. width: 66 km (41 mi)
- Surface area: 3,200 km^{2} (1,200 sq mi)
- Max. depth: 15 m (49 ft)
- Surface elevation: 1,788 m (5,866 ft)
- Islands: The most important are Tana Qirqos, Daga Island, Dek Island, and Mitraha
- Settlements: Bahir Dar, Gorgora

Lake Tana (Amharic: ጣና ሐይቅ, romanized: T’ana ḥāyik’i; previously transcribed Tsana) is the largest lake in Ethiopia and a source of the Blue Nile. Located in Amhara Region in the north-western Ethiopian Highlands, the lake is approximately 84 kilometres (52 miles) long and 66 kilometres (41 miles) wide, with a maximum depth of 15 metres (49 feet), and an elevation of 1,788 metres (5,866 feet). Lake Tana is fed by the Gilgel Abay, Reb and Gumara rivers. Its surface area ranges from 3,000 to 3,500 square kilometres (1,200 to 1,400 square miles), depending on season and rainfall. The lake level has been regulated since the construction of the control weir where the lake discharges into the Blue Nile. This controls the flow to the Blue Nile Falls (Tis Abbai) and hydro-power station.

== Overview ==
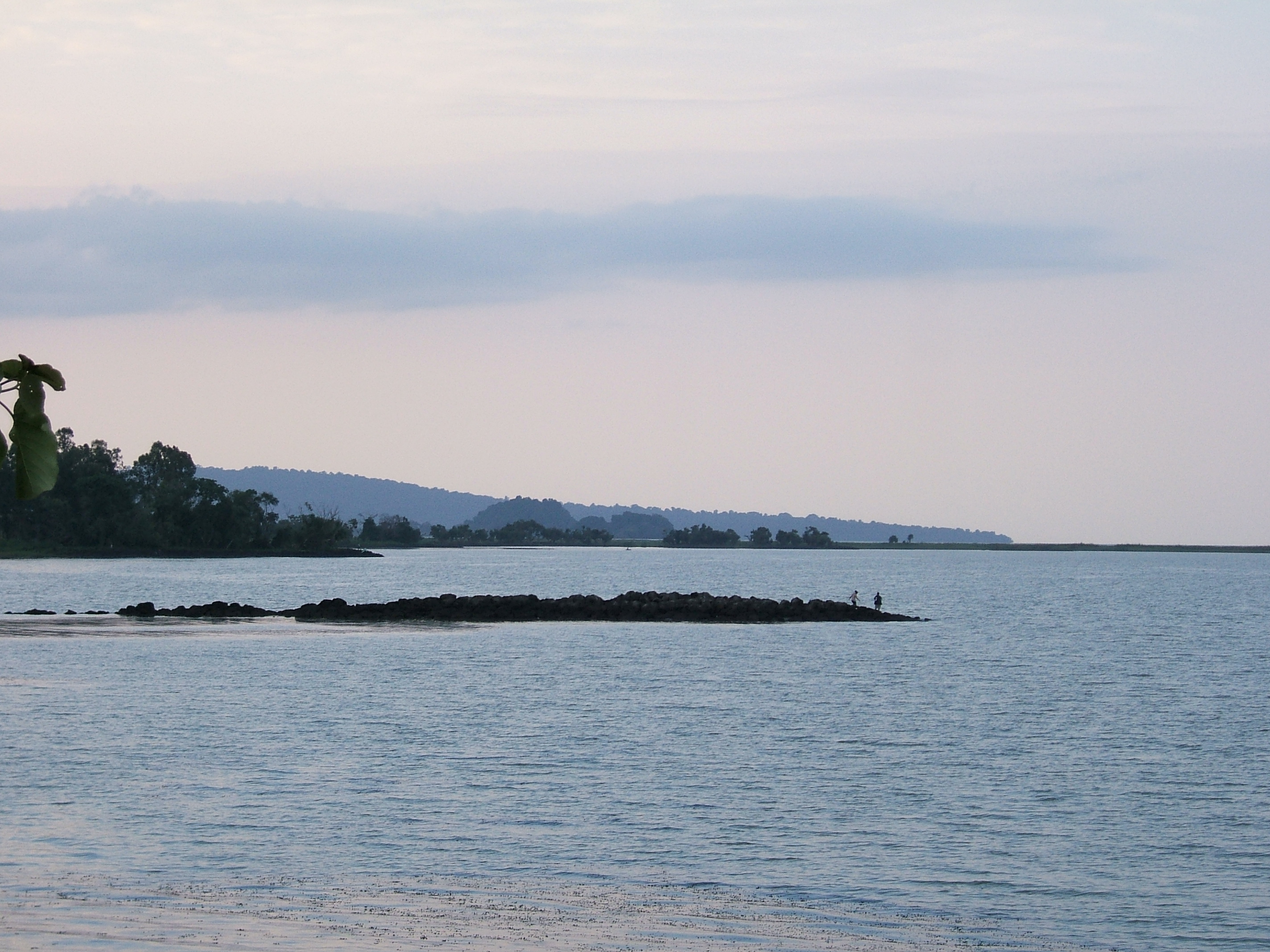
Views over Lake Tana

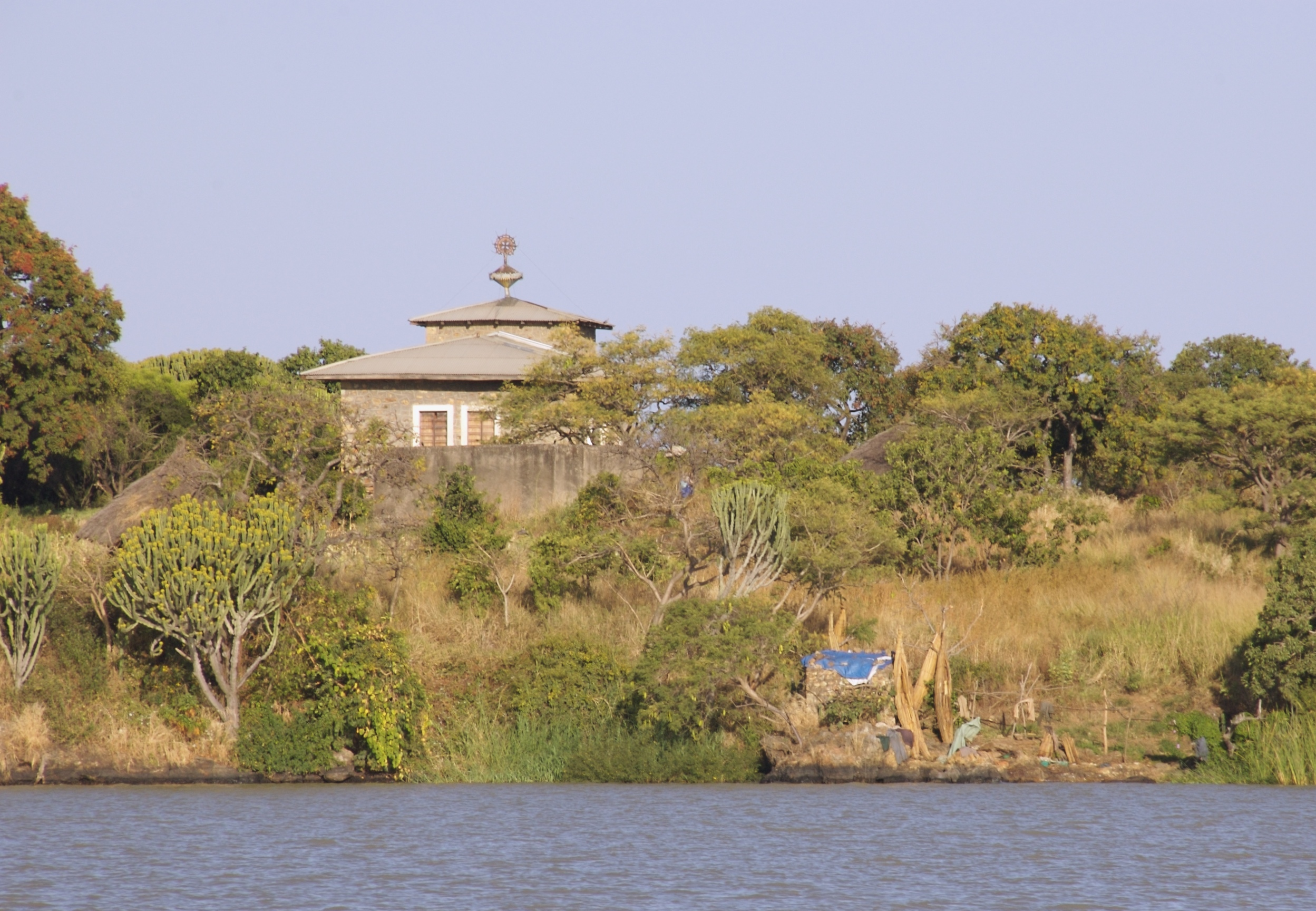
The Island Church on Lake Tana

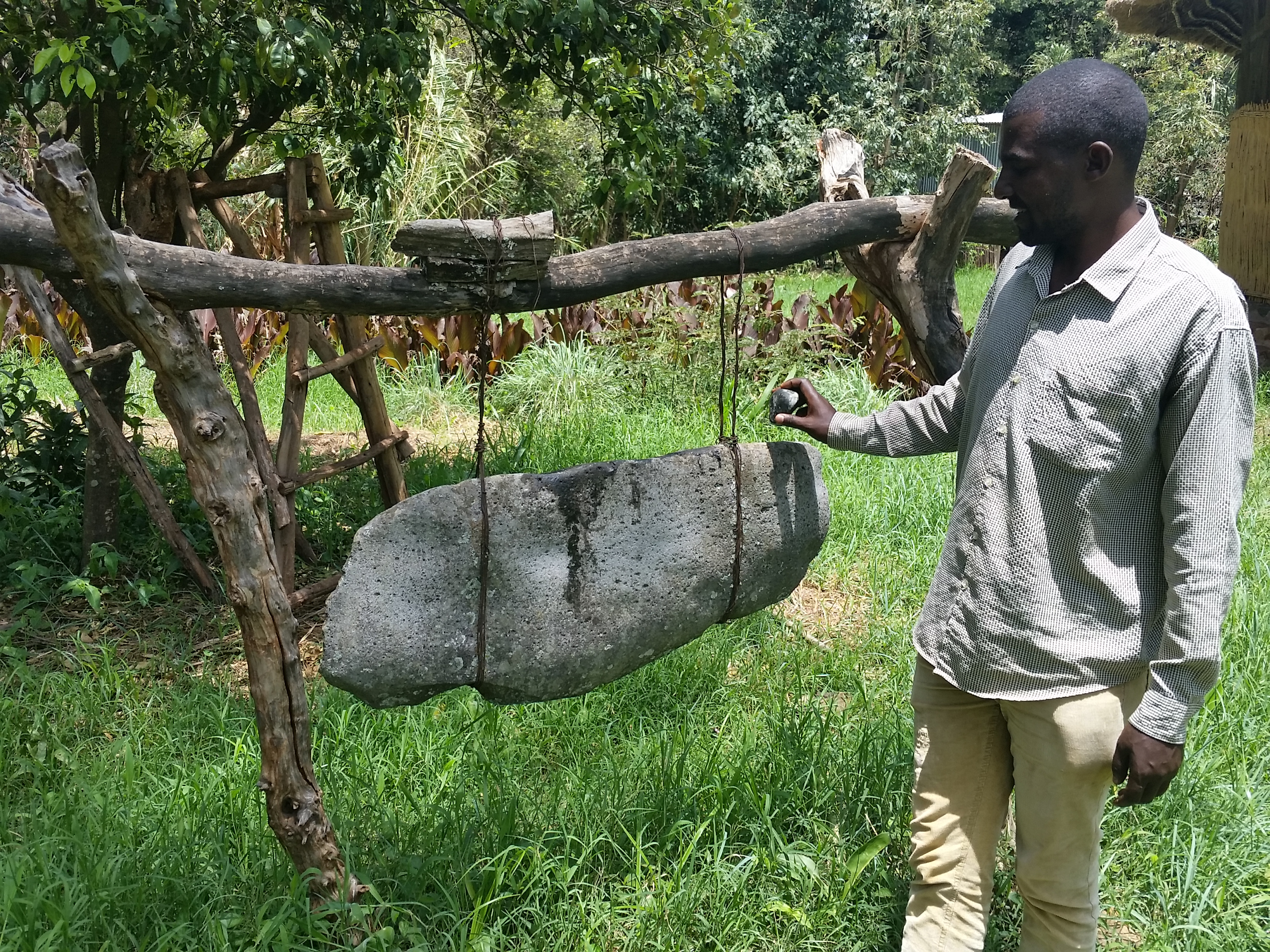
A local tour guide demonstrates how a stone is struck to signal meal times at a monastery on Zege Peninsula

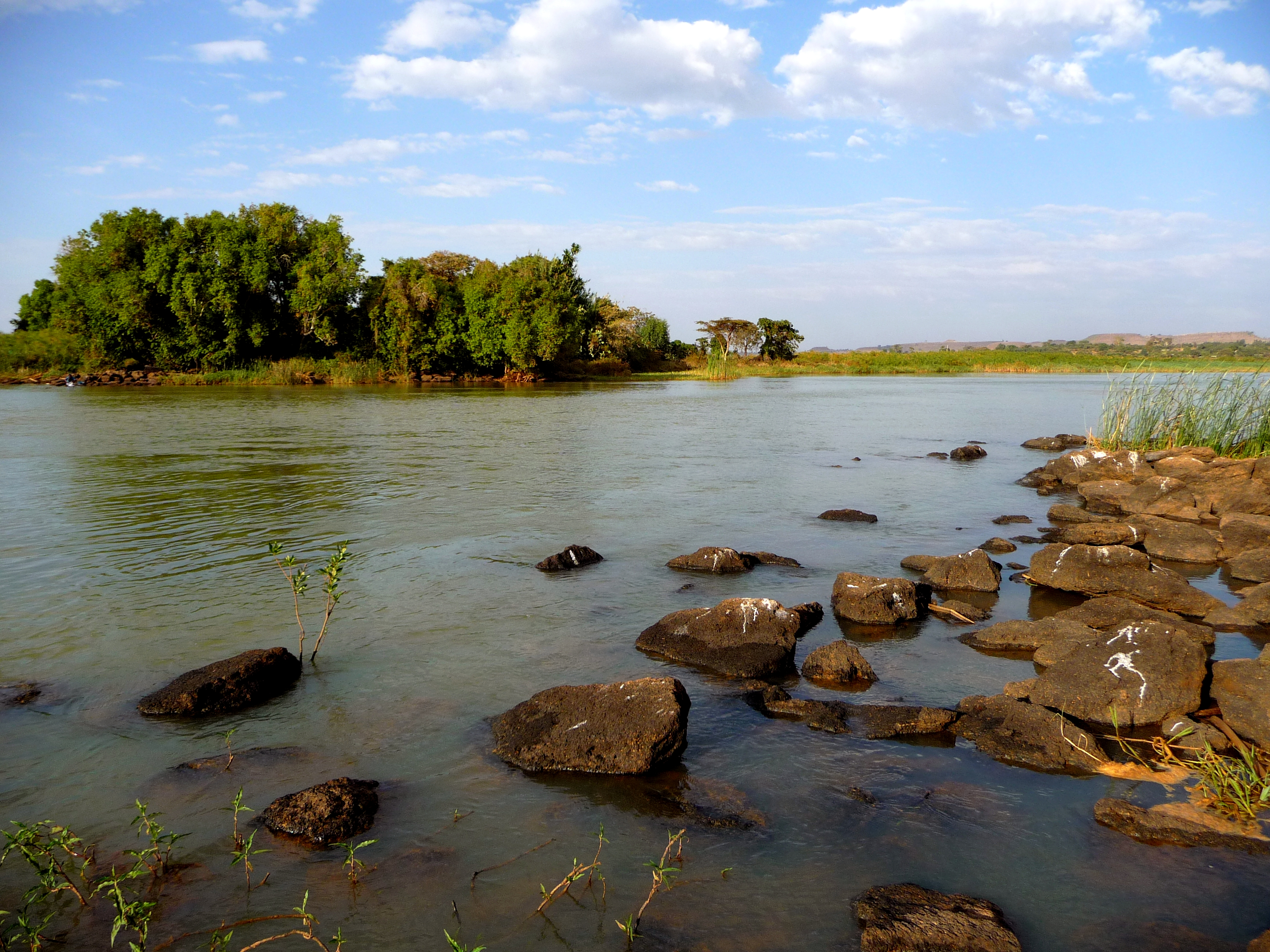
Beginning of the Blue Nile river by its outlet from Lake Tana

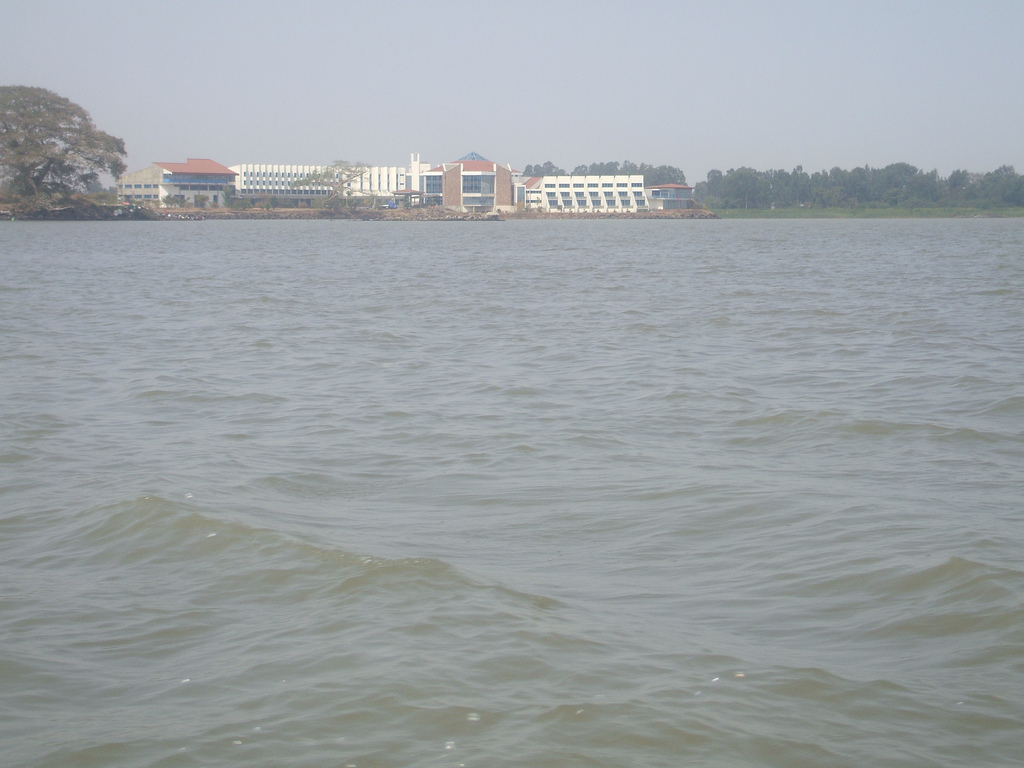
A resort hotel on Lake Tana in Bahir Dar

Lake Tana was formed by volcanic activity, which blocked the flow of inflowing rivers in the early Pleistocene, about 5 million years ago.

The lake was originally much larger than it is today. Seven large permanent rivers feed the lake as well as 40 small seasonal rivers. The main tributaries to the lake are Gilgel Abbay (Little Nile River), and the Megech, Gumara, and Rib rivers.

Lake Tana has a number of islands, whose number varies with the lake's level. It has fallen about 6 feet (1.8 m) in the last 400 years. According to Manuel de Almeida, a Portuguese missionary in the early 17th century, there were 21 islands, seven or eight of which had monasteries on them "formerly large, but now much diminished." When James Bruce visited the area in 1771, he noted that the locals counted 45 inhabited islands, but stated he believed that "the number may be about eleven." Anton Stecker, in 1881, made a detailed examination of the lake, enabling substantially accurate maps, and counted 44 islands. A 20th-century geographer named 37 islands, of which he believed 19 have or had monasteries or churches on them.

Remains of ancient Ethiopian emperors and treasures of Ethiopic Christianity are kept in the isolated island monasteries (including Kebran Gabriel, Ura Kidane Mehret, Narga Selassie, Daga Estifanos, Medhane Alem of Rema Island, Kota Maryam, and Mertola Maryam). On the island of Tana Qirqos is a rock shown to Paul B. Henze, on which he was told Mary, mother of Jesus had rested on her journey back from Egypt; he was also told that Frumentius, who introduced Christianity to Ethiopia, is "allegedly buried on Tana Cherqos." The body of Yekuno Amlak is interred in the monastery of St. Stephen on Daga Island. Emperors whose tombs are also on Daga include Dawit I, Zara Yaqob, Za Dengel, and Fasilides. Other important islands in Lake Tana include Dek, Mitraha, Gelila Zakarias, Halimun and Briguida.

The monasteries are believed to have been built during the Middle Ages over earlier religious sites. They include the fourteenth-century Debre Maryam, and the eighteenth-century Narga Selassie, Tana Qirqos, which is said to have housed the Ark of the Covenant before it was moved to Axum, and Ura Kidane Mehret, known for its regalia. A ferry service links Bahir Dar with Gorgora via Dek and various lakeshore villages.

There is also Zege Peninsula on the southwest portion of the lake. Zege is the site of the Azwa Maryam monastery.

Lake Tana was also a central location of the Beta Israel, complete with the only Jewish monasteries in the world, before their immigration to Israel.

=== Historical and administrative setting ===
Historically, the area surrounding Lake Tana has been closely associated with the wider Gondar and Begemder (በጌምድር) region. Begemder was one of the historic provinces of northwestern Ethiopia, although its geographical and administrative boundaries changed over time. In earlier periods, the name Begemder referred principally to territories east of Lake Tana, while subsequent administrative arrangements expanded the province to encompass a wider area around Gondar and Lake Tana.

A number of settlements and localities around Lake Tana have longstanding historical connections with the Begemder and Gondar region, including Hamusit, Fogera, Gorgora, Delgi, Shawura and the Zege Peninsula. Fogera is situated on the eastern shore of Lake Tana and is associated with the South Gondar area. Gorgora, located on the northern shore of the lake, has also been an important historical and religious centre.

The islands and peninsulas of Lake Tana have played an important role in the religious and cultural history of the surrounding Gondar area. Many of them contain historic Ethiopian Orthodox churches and monasteries, which preserve religious manuscripts, paintings and other elements of Ethiopia’s cultural heritage.

In 2015, the Lake Tana region was nominated as a UNESCO Biosphere Reserve recognizing its national and international natural and cultural importance.

== Water characteristics and floods ==
Compared to other tropical lakes, the waters in Lake Tana are relatively cold, typically ranging from about 20 to 27 °C (68–81 °F). The water has a pH that is neutral to somewhat alkaline and its transparency is quite low.

Because of the large seasonal variations in the inflow of its tributaries, rain and evaporation, the water levels of Lake Tana typically vary by 2–2.5 m (6.6–8.2 ft) in a year, peaking in September–October just after the main wet season. When the water levels are high, the plains around the lake often are flooded and other permanent swamps in the region become connected to the lake.

== Fauna ==
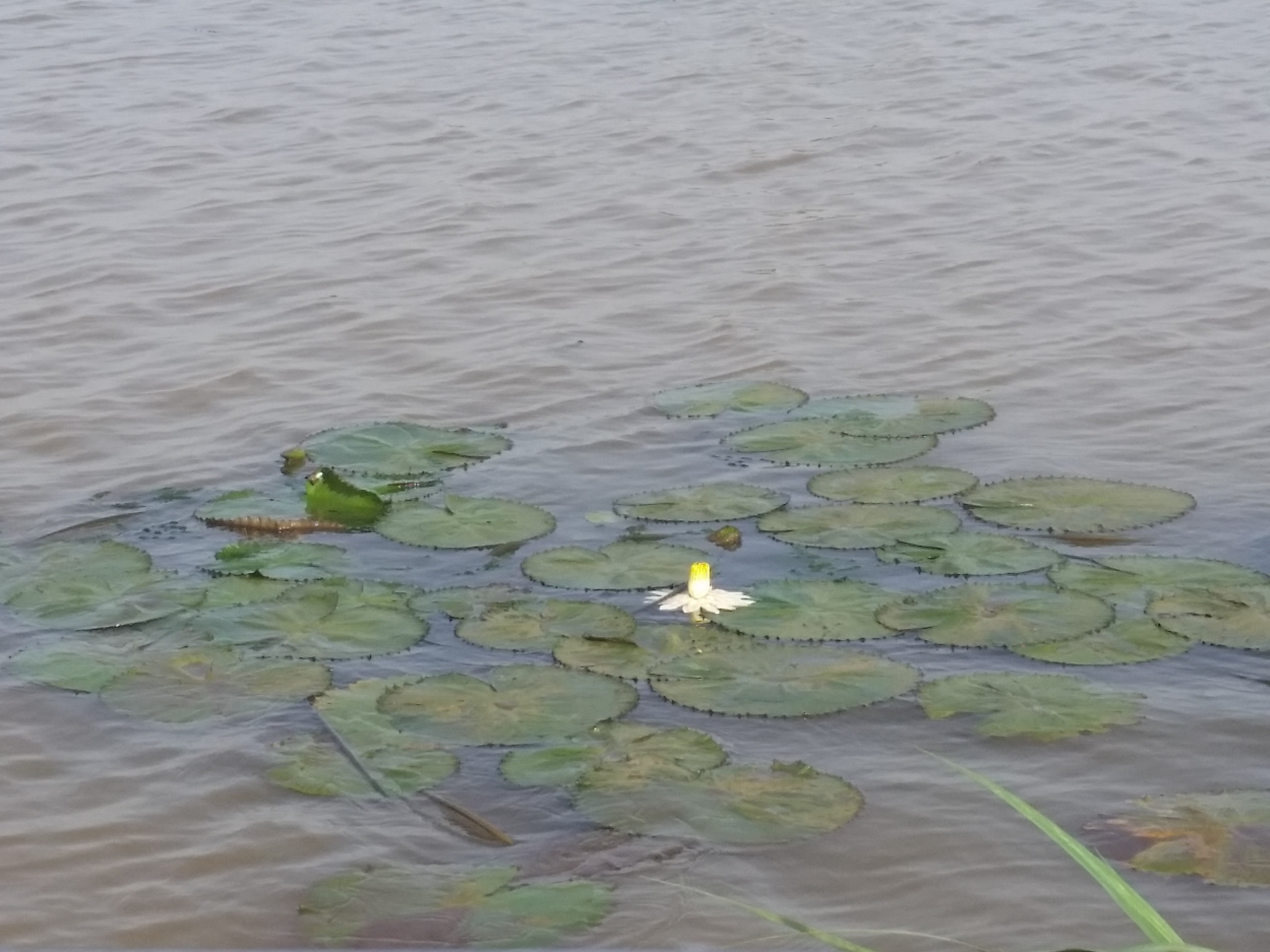
Lily pads floating near the shore on Lake Tana

Since there are no inflows that link the lake to other large waterways and the main outflow, the Blue Nile, is obstructed by the Blue Nile Falls, the lake supports a highly distinctive aquatic fauna, which generally is related to species from the Nile Basin. The lake's nutrient levels are low.

=== Fish ===
There are 27 fish species in Lake Tana and 20 of these are endemic. This includes one of only two known cyprinid species flocks (the other, from Lake Lanao in the Philippines, has been decimated by introduced species). It consists of 15 relatively large, up to 1 m (3 ft 3 in) long, Labeobarbus barbs that formerly were included in Barbus instead. Among these, L. acutirostris, L. longissimus, L. megastoma and L. truttiformis are strictly piscivorous, and L. dainellii, L. gorguari, L. macrophtalmus and L. platydorsus are mostly piscivorous. Their most important prey are the small Enteromius and Garra species. The remaining Labeobarbus in Lake Tana have other specialized feeding habits: L. beso (non-endemic and not closely related to the others) feeds on algae, L. surkis mostly on macrophytes, L. gorgorensis on macrophytes and molluscs, L. brevicephalus on zooplankton (however, juveniles of all members of the species flock feed on zooplankton), L. osseensis on macrophytes and adults insects, and L. crassibarbis, L. intermedius (non-endemic but closely related to the others), L. nedgia and L. tsanensis on benthic invertebrates like chironomid larvae. Among the endemic Labeobarbus, eight species spawn in the lake's wetlands and the remaining move seasonally into its tributaries where they spawn.

In addition to the Labeobarbus species flock, the endemic species are Enteromius pleurogramma, E. tanapelagius, Garra regressus and Afronemacheilus abyssinicus (one of only two African stone loaches). The remaining non-endemic species are Nile tilapia (widespread in Africa, but with the endemic subspecies tana in the lake), E. humilis, G. dembecha, G. dembeensis and the large African sharptooth catfish.

=== Fishing and threats ===
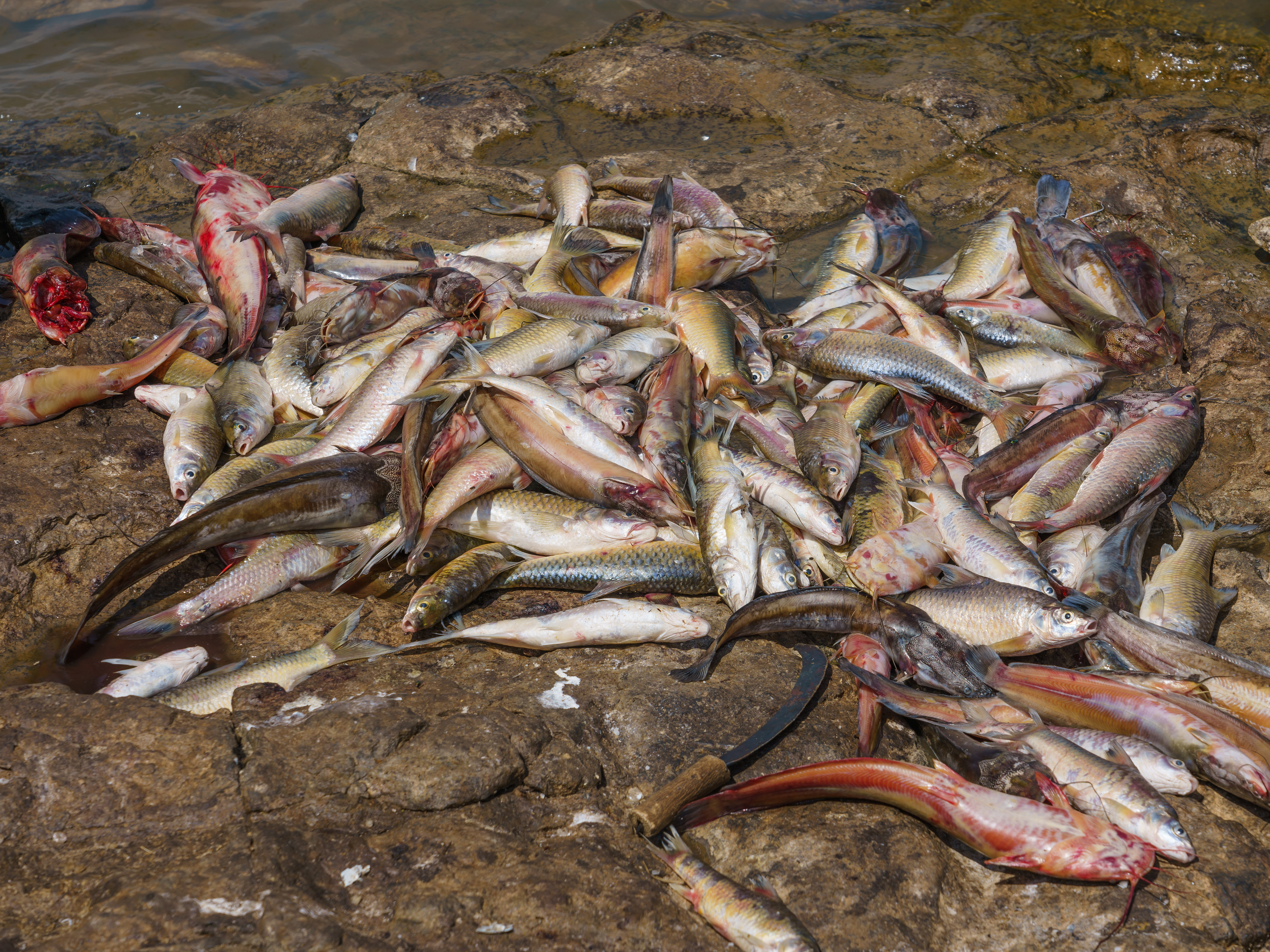
Various Labeobarbus barbs and African sharptooth catfish caught in the lake

Lake Tana supports a large fishing industry, mainly based on the Labeobarbus barbs, Nile tilapia and sharptooth catfish. According to the Ethiopian Department of Fisheries and Aquaculture, 1,454 tons of fish were landed in 2011 at Bahir Dar, which the department estimated was 15% of its sustainable amount. Nevertheless, in a review that compared catches in 2001 to those ten years earlier, it was found that typical sizes of both the tilapia and the catfish had significantly decreased, and populations of the Labeobarbus barbs that breed in the tributaries had significantly declined. Among the endemic fish, most are considered threatened (endangered or vulnerable) or data deficient (available data insufficient for evaluating a status) by the IUCN. In the early 2000s, the local government for the first time introduced a fisheries legislation and it is hoped this will have a positive effect on the fish populations.

Other serious threats are habitat destruction and pollution. Bahir Dar has become a large city and it is rapidly growing; its wastewater is generally released directly into the lake. The vegetation in the lake's wetlands, which are an important nursery for the Labeobarbus and other fish, are being cleared at a fast pace. A potentially serious threat to the unique ecosystem would be an introduction of a large and efficient predatory species like the Nile perch, which has been implicated in numerous extinctions in Lake Victoria. The piscivorous Labeobarbus of Lake Tana are relatively inefficient predators that can only take fish up to about 15% of the length of the predator itself.

=== Other fauna ===
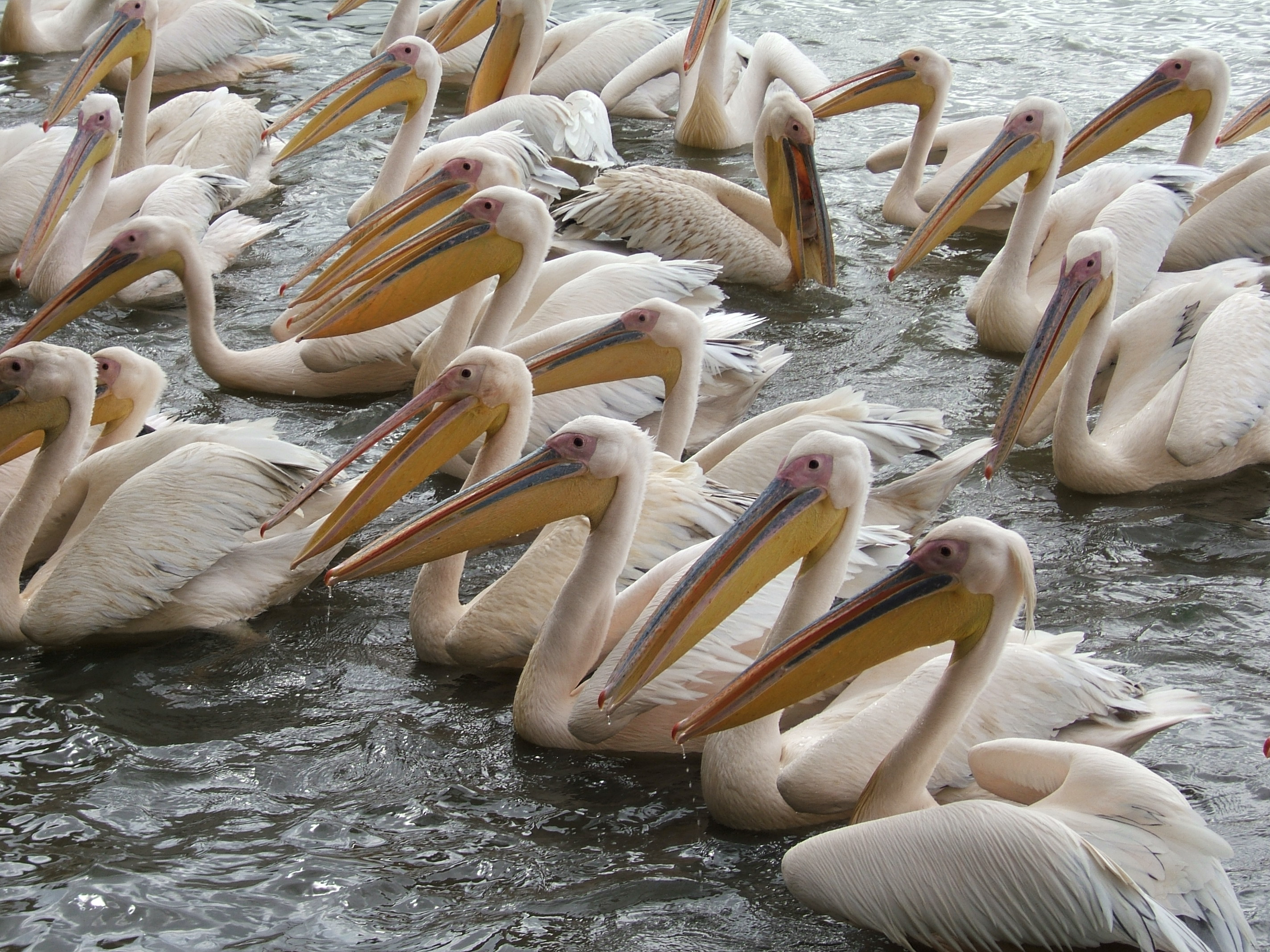
Great white pelicans on Lake Tana

Among other fauna, the lake supports relatively few invertebrates: There are fifteen species of mollusks, including one endemic, and also an endemic freshwater sponge.

About 230 species of birds, including more than 80 wetland birds such as the great white pelican, African darter, hamerkop, storks, African spoonbill, ibis, ducks, kingfishers and African fish eagle, are known from Lake Tana. It is an important resting and feeding ground for many Palearctic migrant waterbirds.

There are no crocodiles, but the African softshell turtle and Nile monitor have been recorded near the Blue Nile outflow from the lake. Hippos are present, mostly near the Blue Nile outflow.
