= Mau =

Mau may refer to:

== Places ==
=== Brazil ===
- Maú River, an alternate name for the Ireng River

=== Kenya ===
- Mau Escarpment
- Mau Forest

=== India ===
- Mau, Bhind, a town in Madhya Pradesh
- Mau, Mawal, Pune district, Marahrashtra
- Mau, Punjab, a village in Punjab
- Mau, Uttar Pradesh, India
- Mau district, Uttar Pradesh
- Mau, Amethi, a village in Uttar Pradesh, India
- Mau, Shri Madhopur, a village in Rajasthan

=== Vietnam ===
- Cà Mau, a city in Vietnam

== People ==
=== Surname ===
- August Mau, German art historian and archaeologist
- Bruce Mau, Canadian designer
- Leonore Mau, German photographer and companion of novelist Hubert Fichte
- Nava Mau, American film-maker
- Vũ Văn Mẫu, the last Prime Minister of South Vietnam

=== Other names ===
- Maú (footballer), Santomean footballer
- Mau Piailug, a traditional Micronesian navigator
- Mau Power, an Australian hip hop artist, born Patrick Mau
- Mau Heymans, a Dutch comics artist for Disney

== Animals ==
- Arabian Mau, a short-haired cat breed
- Egyptian Mau, a short-haired cat breed

== Other uses ==
- Har-mau, an alternative name for the ancient Egyptian deity Horus
- Mau movement, the non-violent anti-colonial movement of Samoa
- Mau-Nilsonne Syndrome, a deformity of the knees better known as Blount's disease
- Mau rakau, the pre-colonial martial system of the Maori people of New Zealand
- Mao (card game)

== See also ==
- Mao (disambiguation)
- Mao Zedong, leader of China 1943–1976
- MAU (disambiguation)
- Mau Mau (disambiguation)
- Maus (disambiguation)
- Maw (disambiguation)
