= Maw =

Maw may refer to:

== Biology ==
- A human's or animal's stomach or gullet, a bird's crop
- A fish's gas bladder (swim bladder)
- Abomasum, the fourth stomach of a ruminant

== Games ==
- Maw (game), a card game
- The Maw, a 2009 video game
- The Maw, the main setting of the video game Little Nightmares
- Maw, a monster in the video game My Singing Monsters

== People with the surname ==
- Carlyle E. Maw (1903–1987), American lawyer and politician
- George Maw (1832–1912), English botanist and artist
- Herbert B. Maw (1893–1990), American politician
- Nicholas Maw (1935–2009), British composer
- William Maw (1838–1924), British civil engineer

== Other ==
- A Scots language word for mother
- North American slang for "mother"
- Maw (state), one of the Shan states of Southeast Asia
- Maw language (disambiguation)
- Mace (bludgeon), a weapon
- Maw & Co, British manufacturer of ceramic tiles

== See also ==
- MAW (disambiguation)
- Mawe (disambiguation)
