= Maws =

Maws or MAWS may refer to:

- the plural of maw
- Missile approach warning system
- My Adventures with Superman, a 2023 animated superhero TV series
- Tony Maws, American chef

== See also ==
- Maw (disambiguation)
- Mawes (disambiguation)
- Maus (disambiguation)
