= Amhara Region =

Regional state in northern Ethiopia

Amhara Region አምሐራ ክልል
- Regional state
- Amhara National Regional State
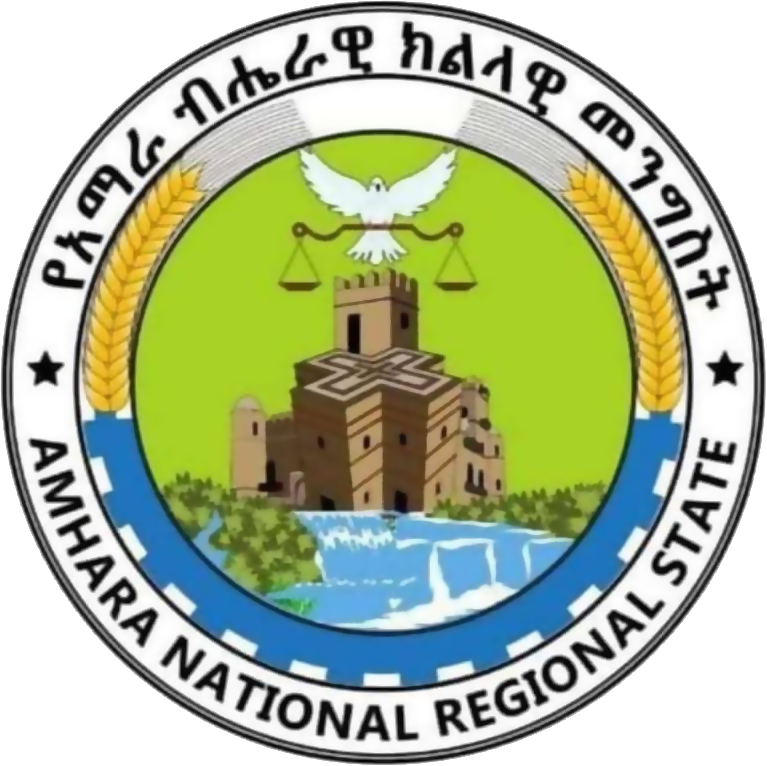
- Flag Seal

- Map of Ethiopia showing the Amhara Region
- Coordinates: 11°39′39″N 37°57′28″E
- Country: Ethiopia
- Established: 1999
- Capital: Bahir Dar

Government
  - Chief Administrator: Arega Kebede

Area
  - Total: 194,708.96 km^{2} (75,177.55 sq mi)
  - Rank: 3rd

Population (2025)
  - Total: 32,936,000
  - Rank: 2nd in Ethiopia
  - Density: 169.16/km^{2} (438.11/sq mi)
- Demonym: Amharas

Demographics
  - Official language: Amharic
  - Other languages and ethnicities: Awi Agaw, Argobba, Qemant, Oromo
- ISO 3166 code: ET-AM
- HDI (2021): 0.477 low · 9th of 11

The Amhara Region (Amharic: አምሐራ ክልል, romanized: Āmḥara Kilil (Note: Based on the BGN/PCGN romanization of Amharic.)), officially the Amhara National Regional State (Amharic: የአምሐራ ብሔራዊ ክልላዊ መንግሥት, romanized: yä-Amḥara Bəḥerawi Kəlləlawi Mängəst (Note: Based on the EAE romanization of Amharic.)), is a regional state in northern Ethiopia and the homeland of the Amhara, Argobba, Awi, Beta Israel, Qemant, Wollo Oromo, and Xamir people people. Its capital is Bahir Dar which is the seat of the Regional Government of Amhara. Amhara is the site of the largest inland body of water in Ethiopia, Lake Tana (which is the source of the Blue Nile), Grand Renaissance Dam and Semien Mountains National Park (which includes Ras Dashan, the highest point in Ethiopia). Amhara is bordered by Sudan to the west and northwest and by these other regions of Ethiopia: Tigray to the north, Afar to the east, Benishangul-Gumuz to southwest, and Oromia to the south. Towns and cities in Amhara include: Dessie, Gonder, Debre Birhan, Debre Tabor, Kombolcha, Weldiya, Debre Markos, Seqota, Kobo, and Metema. The Region's name is said to mean "noble" or "highland".

== History ==
During the Ethiopian Empire, many provinces overlap with the Amhara Region today such as Bete Amhara, Gojjam, Gonder, Angot, Dembiya, Shewa and Lasta. The current Amhara region corresponds to often large parts of the former provinces of Begemder, Dembiya, Angot, Bete Amhara, Gojjam and Shewa. With the rise of the Solomonic Dynasty in 1270 under Emperor Yekuno Amlak in Bete Amhara near to modern day Dessie around Lake Hayk (born in the Maqdalla region) and until the establishment of Gondar as the new imperial capital around 1600, the Debre-Birhan to Mekane-Selassie region was the primary seat of the roving Wolloye-Shewan emperors. This period is most significant in the formation of the medieval Ethiopian state, the spread and consolidation of Ethiopian Orthodox Christianity (following the example set by the Zagwe kings in preserving the Axumite heritage) and propagating to the core provinces (besides Tigray/Eritrea, and Lasta) of Bete Amhara, Gojjam, Begemder, northern Shewa, Gafat, and Damot.

The region's recorded history, in fact, goes back to the early 13th century. For example, St. George's Church in the town of Woreilu (whose Tabot is reputed to have been carried by Emperor Menelik at the Battle of Adwa) was established around 1200.

The parish of Mekane Selassie (መካነ ሥላሴ), near Neded and the home of the cathedral by the same name, served as a favourite royal playground. The construction of Mekane Selassie (meaning: the abode of the Trinity) was begun by Emperor Naod (1494-1508) and completed by his son Emperor Lebna Dengel. This was a year before the church (along with a large number of monasteries in the region) was sacked and burned down in 1531 by the invasion led by Ahmad bin Ibrahim. Francisco Alvarez, who had earlier visited the church, confirms that its size was some 150 feet by 150 feet — wholly covered in gold leaf, inlaid with gems, pearls and corals.

=== 21st century ===
After the social movements of 2014–2017, Amhara nationalism developed strongly in the region, with a discourse that includes both issues of power balance between elites and territorial claims. Several local politicians, such as Dejene Maru backed by General Asaminew Tsige, were able to control armed factions.

On 22 June 2019, factions of the security forces of the region attempted a coup d'état against the regional government, during which the President of the Amhara region, Ambachew Mekonnen, was assassinated. A bodyguard siding with the nationalist factions assassinated General Se'are Mekonnen – the Chief of the General Staff of the Ethiopian National Defense Force – as well as his aide, Major General Gizae Aberra. The Prime Minister's Office accused Brigadier General Asaminew Tsige, head of the Amhara region security forces, of leading the plot, and Tsige was shot dead by police near Bahir Dar on 24 June.

In April 2023, a strife occurred between the regional special forces of federal government and Fano militia units, advancing to large scale protests in Gondar, Kobo, Seqota, Weldiya on 9 April. Further insurgency was escalated between the two belligerents, resulted in War in Amhara. Since August 2023, Fano militants and ENDF troops intermittently controlled most part of the region, leading to major human rights violations and subsequent state of emergency. Since the outbreak of the war, the region experienced internal displacements, extrajudicial killings and extensive property damages. According to the Ethiopian Human Rights Commission (EHRC) reports, 45 civilians were killed in Amhara region by security forces for allegedly supporting Fano in late January 2024.

== Geography ==
=== Water flow ===
The Amhara region is home to five lakes: Lake Tana, Lake Hayq, Lake Ardibbo, Lake Zengena and Lake Tirba.

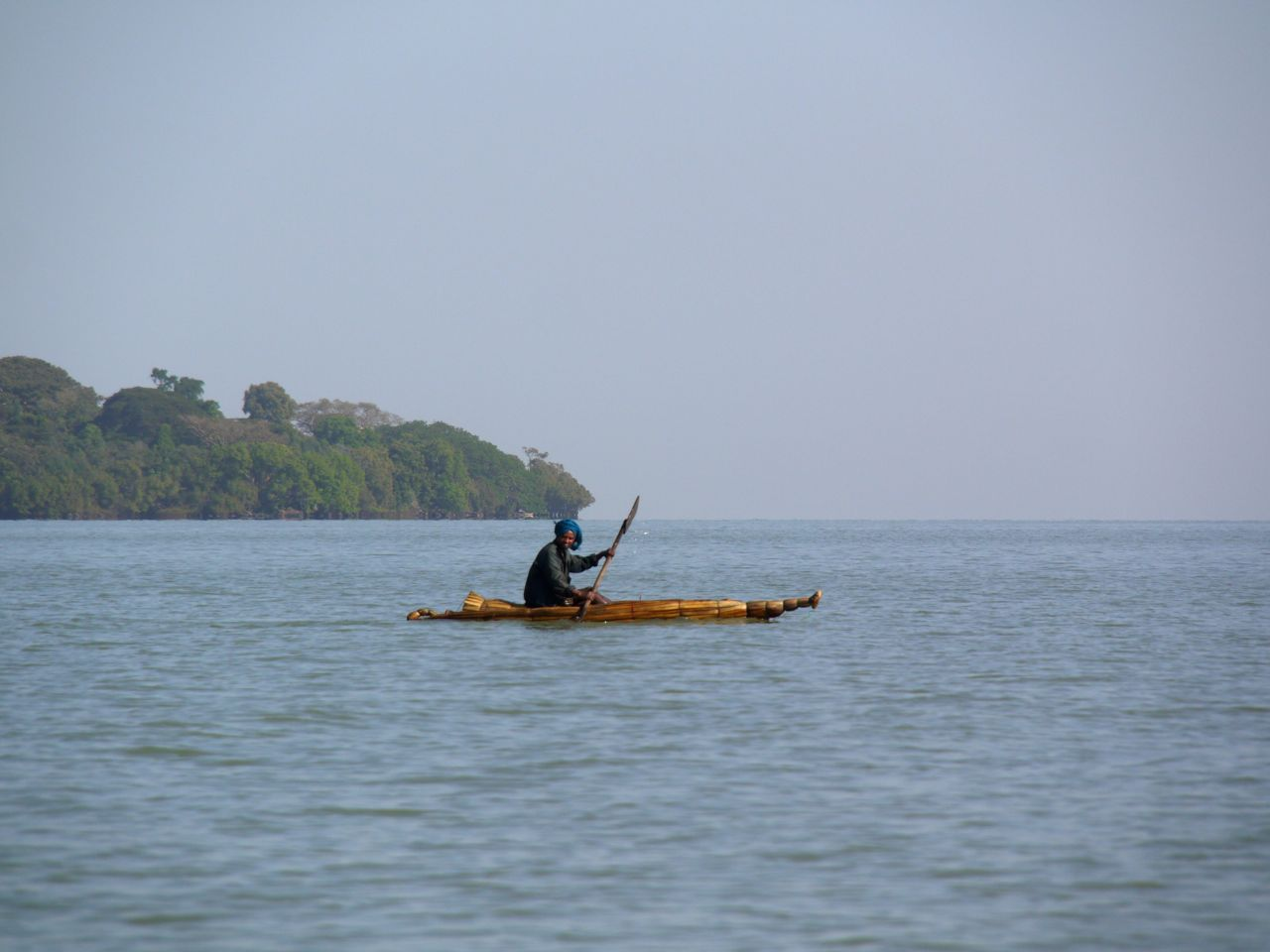
Amhara man riding a boat on the shores of Lake Tana

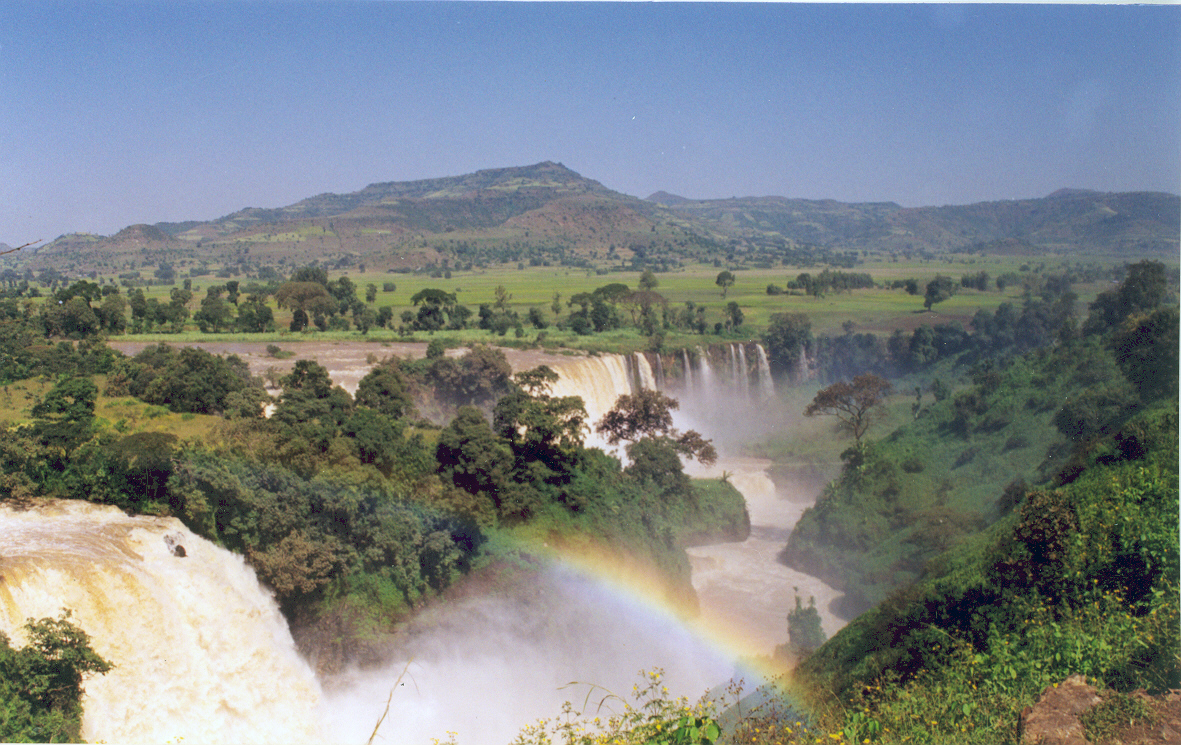
The Blue Nile Falls near Bahir Dar

According to the Ethiopian government website, the Amhara Highlands receive 80% of Ethiopia’s total annual rainfall and are the country's most fertile and climatically hospitable region. Lake Tana, in the Amhara Region, is the source of the Blue Nile—at Bahir Dar. When the Blue Nile's flow is at maximum volume (during the rainy season from June to September), it supplies about two-thirds of the water of the Nile proper. Until the completion of the Aswan High Dam in 1970, the Blue Nile and the Atbara River contributed to the annual flooding of the Nile, depositing fertile silt across the Nile Valley.

==== Lake Tana ====
Lake Tana contains several islands, whose numbers vary depending on the water level in the lake. (Over the last 400 years, that level has fallen about 2 metres (6.6 ft).) In the early 17th century, according to a contemporaneous report by Manoel de Almeida, a Portuguese missionary, there were 21 islands, which he described as "formerly large, but now much diminished," and seven or eight of them had monasteries on them. In the late 18th century, James Bruce visited the area and noted that, though the locals reported that there were 45 inhabited islands, he believed that "the number may be about eleven." A mid-twentieth-century account reported 37 islands and said that 19 of them were the current or former sites of either monasteries or churches.

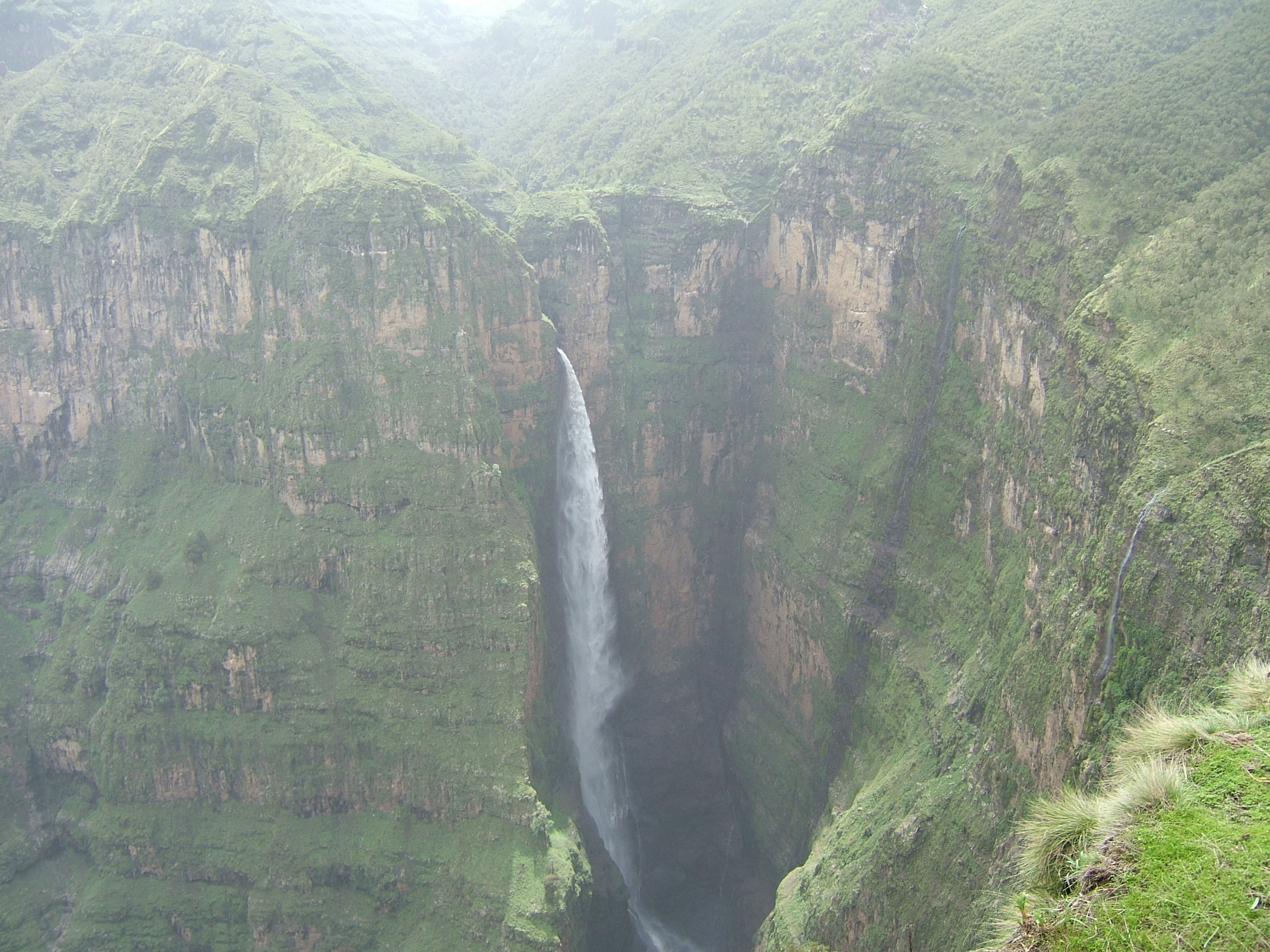
Jin Bahir Falls in the Semien Mountains

The lake islands were the home of ancient Ethiopian emperors. Treasures of the Ethiopian Church are kept in the isolated island monasteries (including Kebran Gabriel, Ura Kidane Mehret, Narga Selassie, Daga Estifanos, Medhane Alem of Rema, Kota Maryam and Mertola Maryam). The body of Yekuno Amlak is interred in the monastery of St. Stephen on Daga Island; other Emperors whose tombs are on Daga include Dawit I, Zara Yaqob, Za Dengel, and Fasilides. Other important islands in Lake Tana include Dek, Mitraha, Gelila Zakarias, Halimun, and Briguida.

In the late 20th century, the scholar Paul B. Henze reported being shown a rock on the island of Tana Qirqos and being told it was where the Virgin Mary had rested during her journey back from Egypt. He was also told that Saint Frumentius, the bishop known for introducing Christianity to Ethiopia, was "allegedly buried on Tana Cherqos."

== Landmarks ==
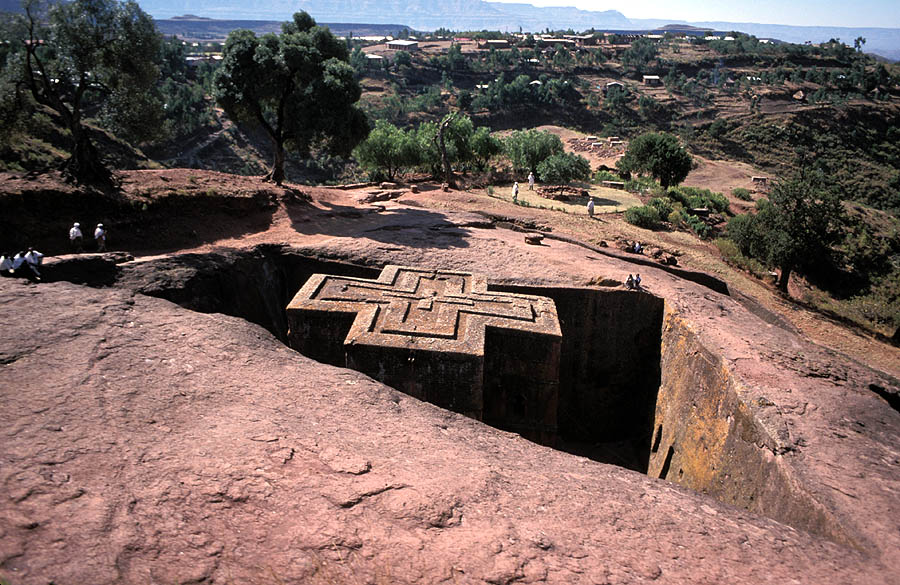
Bete Giyorgis, one of the churches in Lalibela

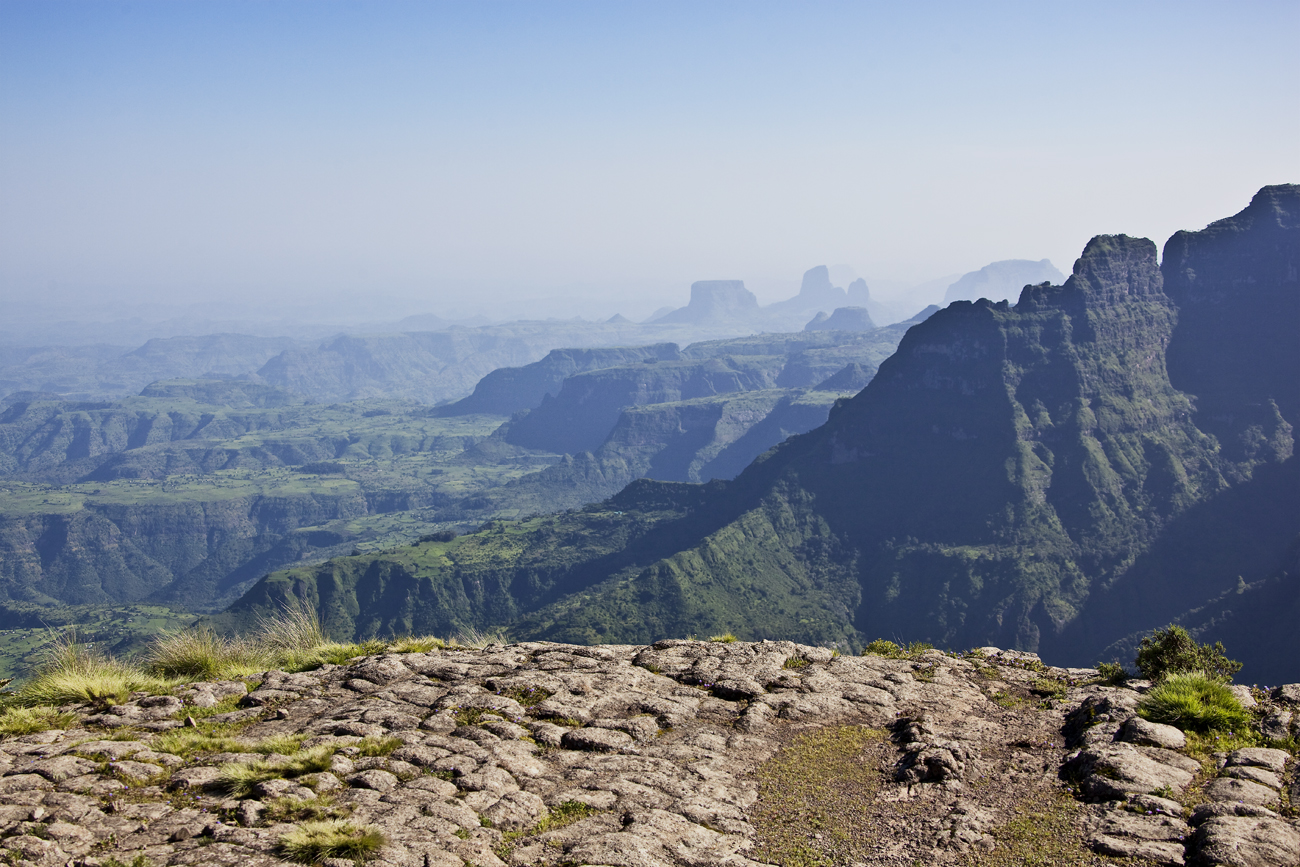
Semien Mountains in North Gonder

The Amhara region has the most world heritage sites of any region in Ethiopia and is endowed with natural and geographic wonders and ecosystems. The region contains Ethiopia's largest inland body of water Lake Tana, which is the source of the Blue Nile river. In 2015 Lake Tana was recognized as a UNESCO Biosphere Reserve for its enormous biodiversity, and national and international importance. The Semien Mountains National Park has been designated as one of the first natural World Heritage Site by UNESCO in the world, and the very first in Africa in the natural criteria since 1978. Chosen for its spectacular landscapes and global significance for biodiversity conservation. Situated within the Semien Mountains, Ethiopia's highest peaks Ras Dashen reaches an elevation of (4,543 m (14,905 ft)). The park also has Ethiopia's second and third highest mountains, Kidis Yared (4,453 m (14,610 ft)) and Mount Bwahit (4,437 m (14,557 ft)). The park is home to endangered species found nowhere else in the world, examples of endemic fauna include the iconic walia ibex, the gelada baboon, and the Ethiopian wolf (or Simien fox) among others. The wide range of altitudes has given the country a variety of ecologically distinct areas, leading to the evolution of endemic species in ecological isolation.

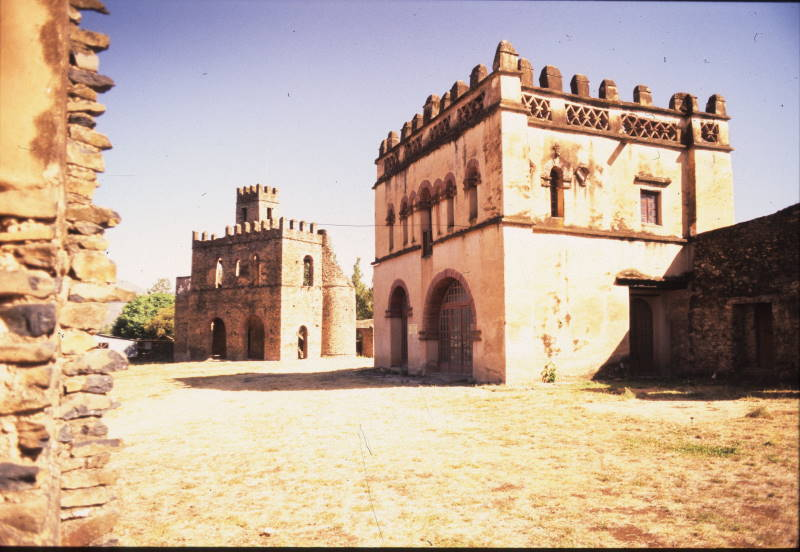
Fasil Ghebbi in Gondar City

Amhara region also leads in cultural world heritage sites in Ethiopia, with the Rock Hewn Churches of Lalibela jointly added with Senegal's Gorée island as Africa's first World Heritage site by Unesco in the cultural criteria in 1978. Lalibela and its medieval monolithic churches attracts by far the most number of pilgrims annually of any religious site in Ethiopia. The New Jerusalem was built in response to the capture of old Jerusalem by Muslim forces during the Siege of Jerusalem (1187), after which Muslims denied Ethiopian Christians pilgrimages to the Holy land. Unesco also added Fasil Ghebbi in 1979 as a cultural World Heritage Site. The Royal Enclosure of Fasil Ghebbi was the seat of the Ethiopian Emperors in Gondar the royal capital for more than two centuries(1636 to 1864 AD). The Fasil Ghebbi consist of some twenty palaces, royal buildings, the royal library, a chancellery, a banqueting hall, stables for the horses, highly decorated churches, monasteries and unique public and private buildings that was built during the reign of several emperors in the Gondarine period. The complex covers an area of 70 square kilometers.

== Demographics ==
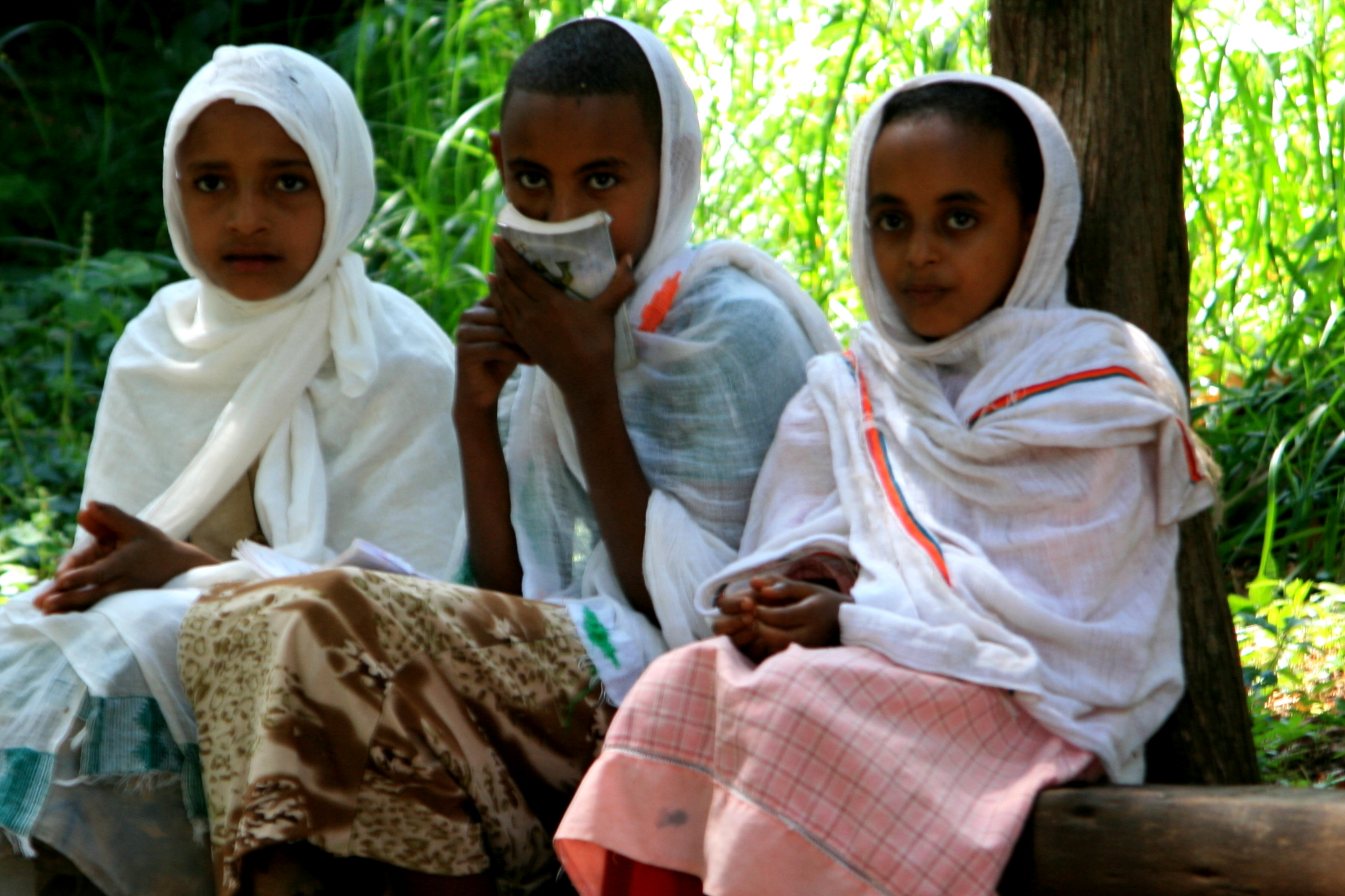
Netela (white head covering) worn by three Amhara girls. The Amharas live in Amhara Region

Based on the 2007 census conducted by the Central Statistical Agency of Ethiopia (CSA), the Amhara region has a population of 17,221,976. 8,641,580 were men and 8,580,396 women; urban inhabitants number 2,112,595 or 12.27% of the population. With an estimated area of 154,708.96 km^{2} (59,733.46 sq mi), this region has an estimated density of 108.2 people per square kilometer. For the entire region, 3,983,768 households were counted, which results in an average for the region of 4.3 persons to a household, with urban households having on average 3.3 and rural households 4.5 people. The projected population as of 2022 was 32,134,988.

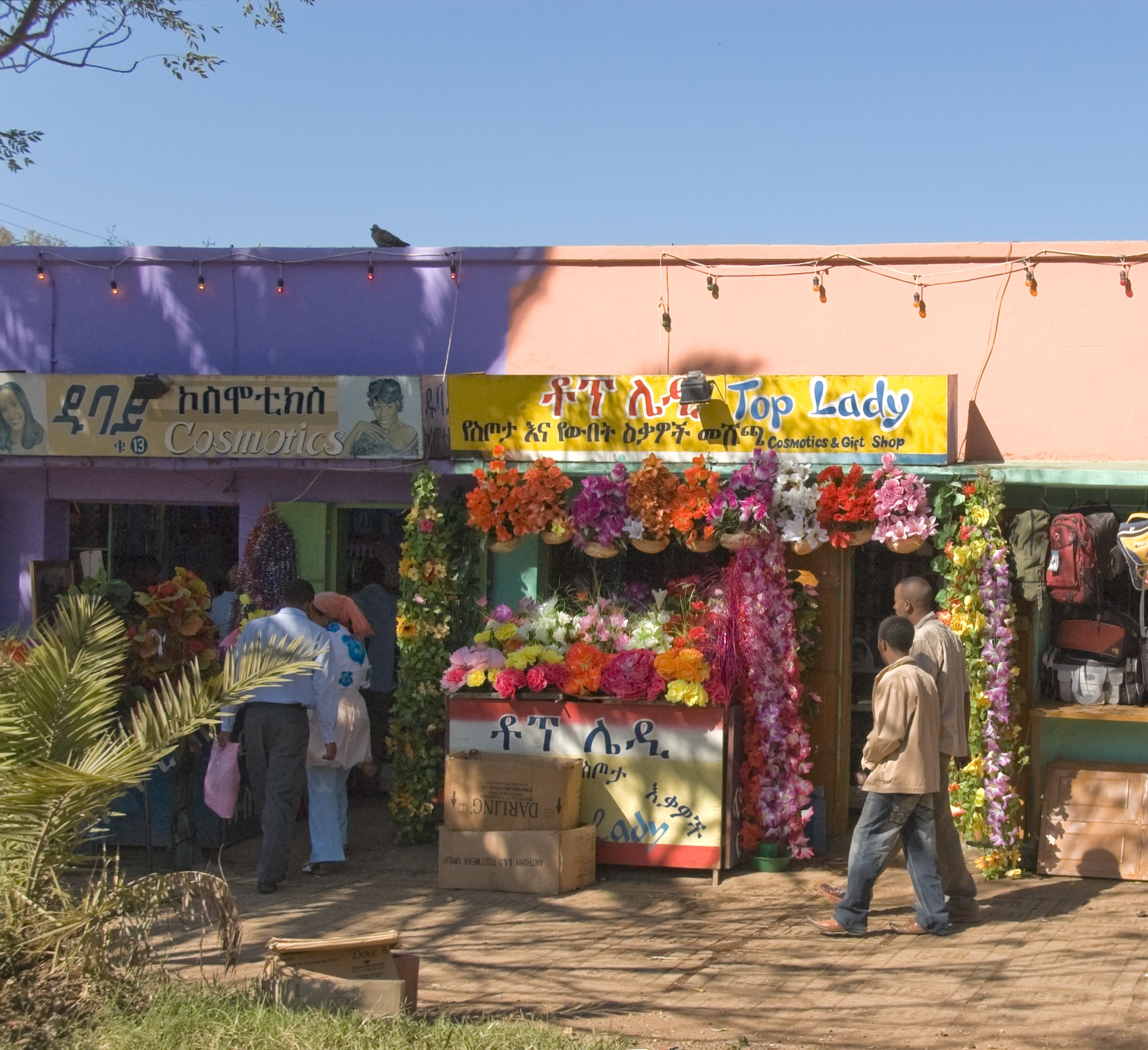
Street in Bahir Dar City

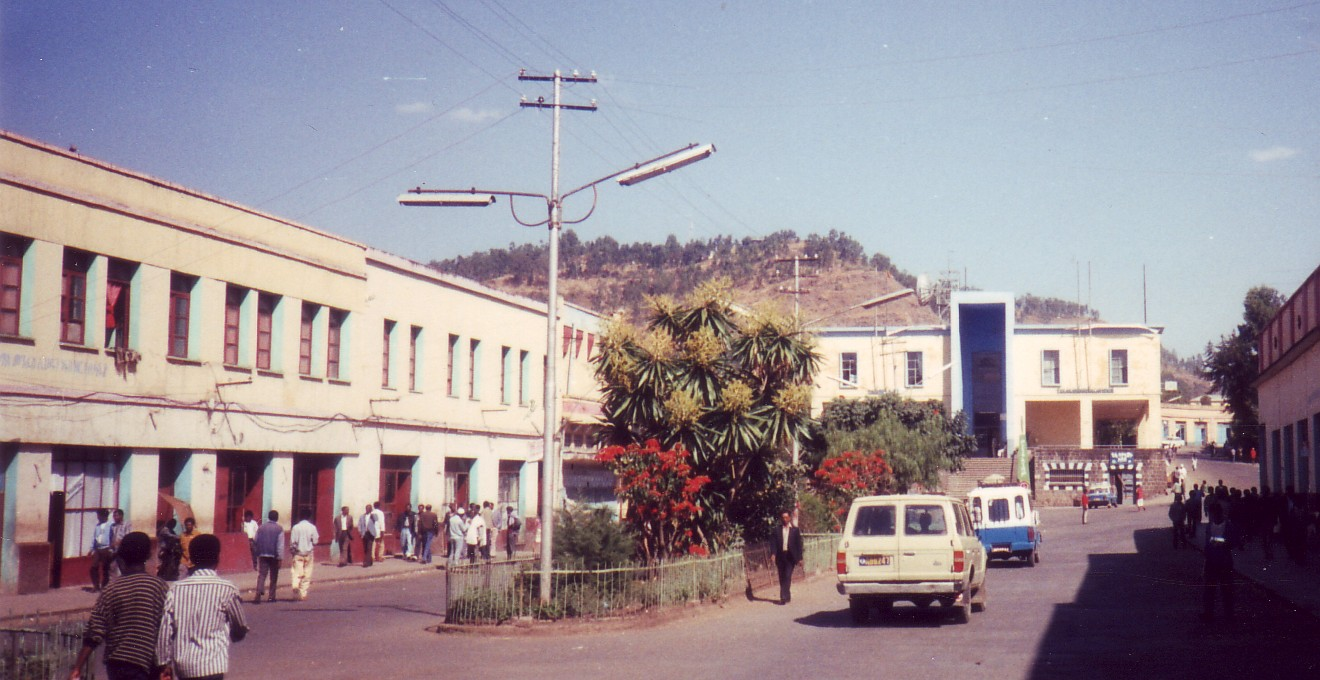
Gondar piazza

In the previous census, conducted in 1994, the region's population was reported to be 13,834,297 of whom 6,947,546 were men and 6,886,751 women; urban inhabitants numbered 1,265,315 or 9.15% of the population.

According to the CSA, as of 2004, 28% of the total population had access to safe drinking water, including 19.89% of rural inhabitants and 91.8% of urban inhabitants. Values for other reported common indicators of the standard of living for Amhara as of 2005 include the following: 17.5% of the inhabitants fall into the lowest wealth quintile; adult literacy for men is 54% and for women 25.1%; and the regional infant mortality rate is 94 infant deaths per 1,000 live births, which is greater than the nationwide average of 77; at least half of these deaths occurred in the infants’ first month of life.

Historical population
Year	Pop.	±%
1994	13,834,297	—
2007	17,221,976	+24.5%
2022	23,216,000	+34.8%

=== Ethnic groups ===
At 91.47% of the local population, the region is predominantly inhabited by people from the Semitic-speaking Amhara ethnic group. Most other residents hail from other Afro-Asiatic language communities, including the Agaw/Awi, Oromo, Beta Israel, Qemant, Agaw/Kamyr and Argobba. Gumuz is another community located in parts in Amhara Region, speaking a Nilo-Saharan language.

Ethnic group	1994 Census	2007 Census
Amhara	91.2%	91.47%
Agaw/Awi	2.7%	3.46%
Oromo	3%	2.62%
Agaw/Kamyr	1%	1.39%
Argobba	0.3%	0.41%
Qemant	1.2%	N/A
Tigrayan	0.9%	0.65

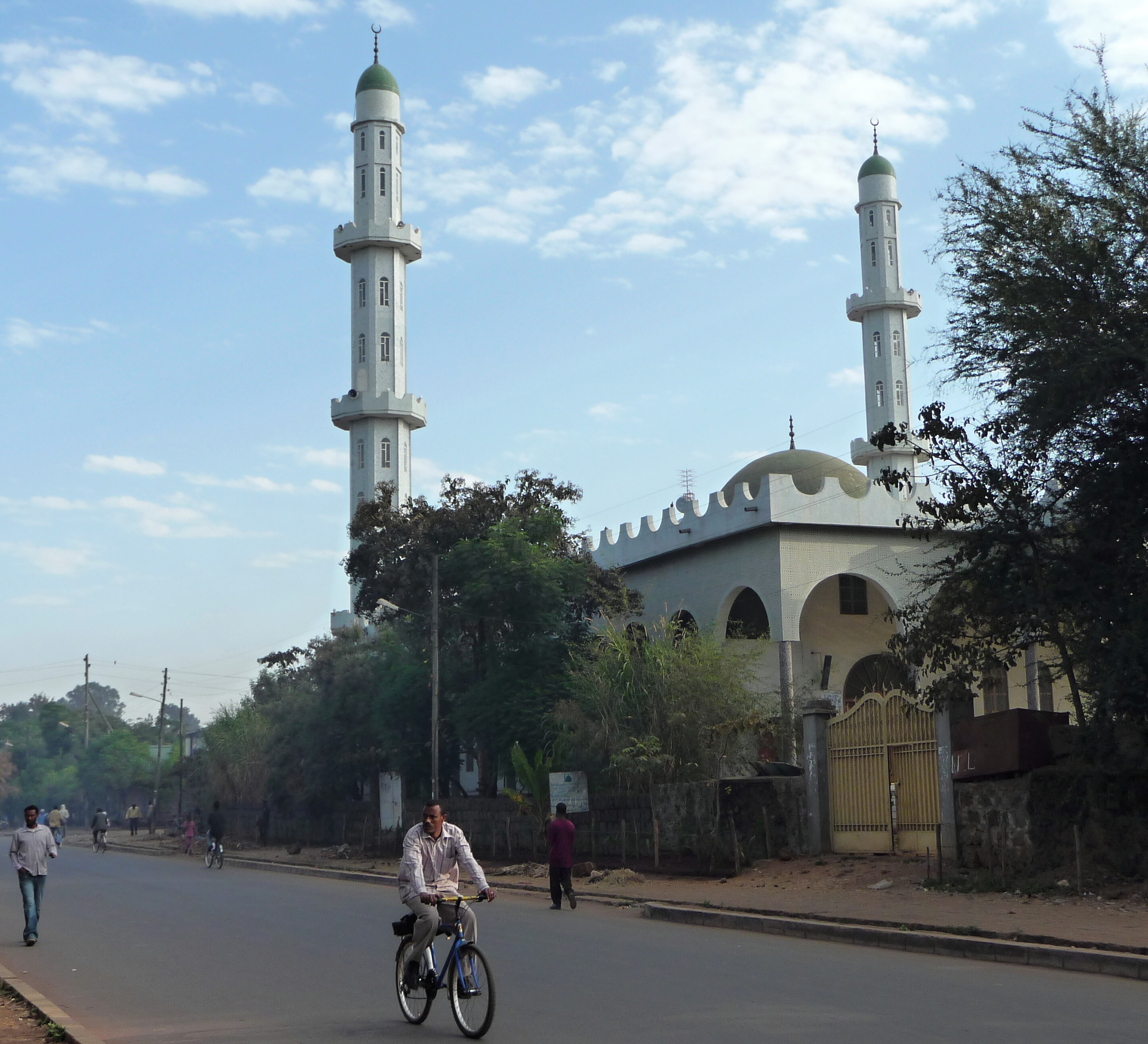
Mosque in Bahir Dar City

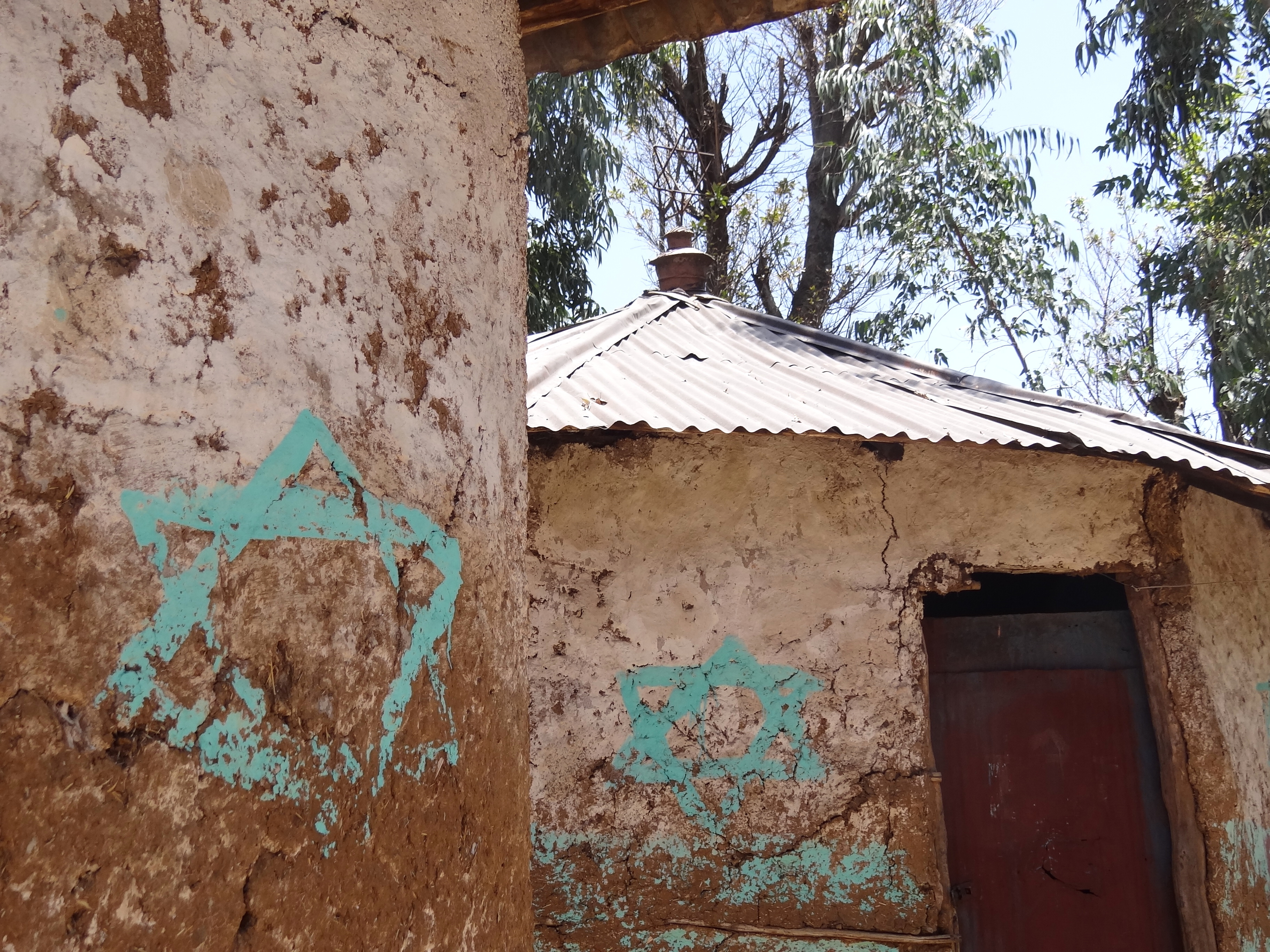
Synagogue outside Gondar City

=== Religion ===
Religion in Amhara Region (2007)
1. Ethiopian Orthodox (82.5%)
2. Muslim (17.2%)
3. P'ent'ay (0.20%)
4. Other (0.10%)

The predominant religion of the Amhara for centuries has been Christianity, with the Ethiopian Orthodox Tewahedo Church playing a central role in the culture of the Amhara region. According to the 2007 census, 82.5% of the population of the Amhara region (which is 91.2% Amhara) were Ethiopian Orthodox; 17.2% were Muslim, and 0.2% were Protestant ("P'ent'ay"). The Ethiopian Orthodox Church maintains close links with the Coptic Orthodox Church of Alexandria. Easter and Epiphany are the most important celebrations, marked with services, feasting and dancing. There are also many fast days throughout the year, when only vegetables or fish may be eaten.

Marriages are often arranged, with men marrying in their late teens or early twenties. Traditionally, girls were married as young as 14, but in the 20th century, the minimum age was raised to 18. After a church wedding, divorce is frowned upon. Each family hosts a separate wedding feast after the wedding.

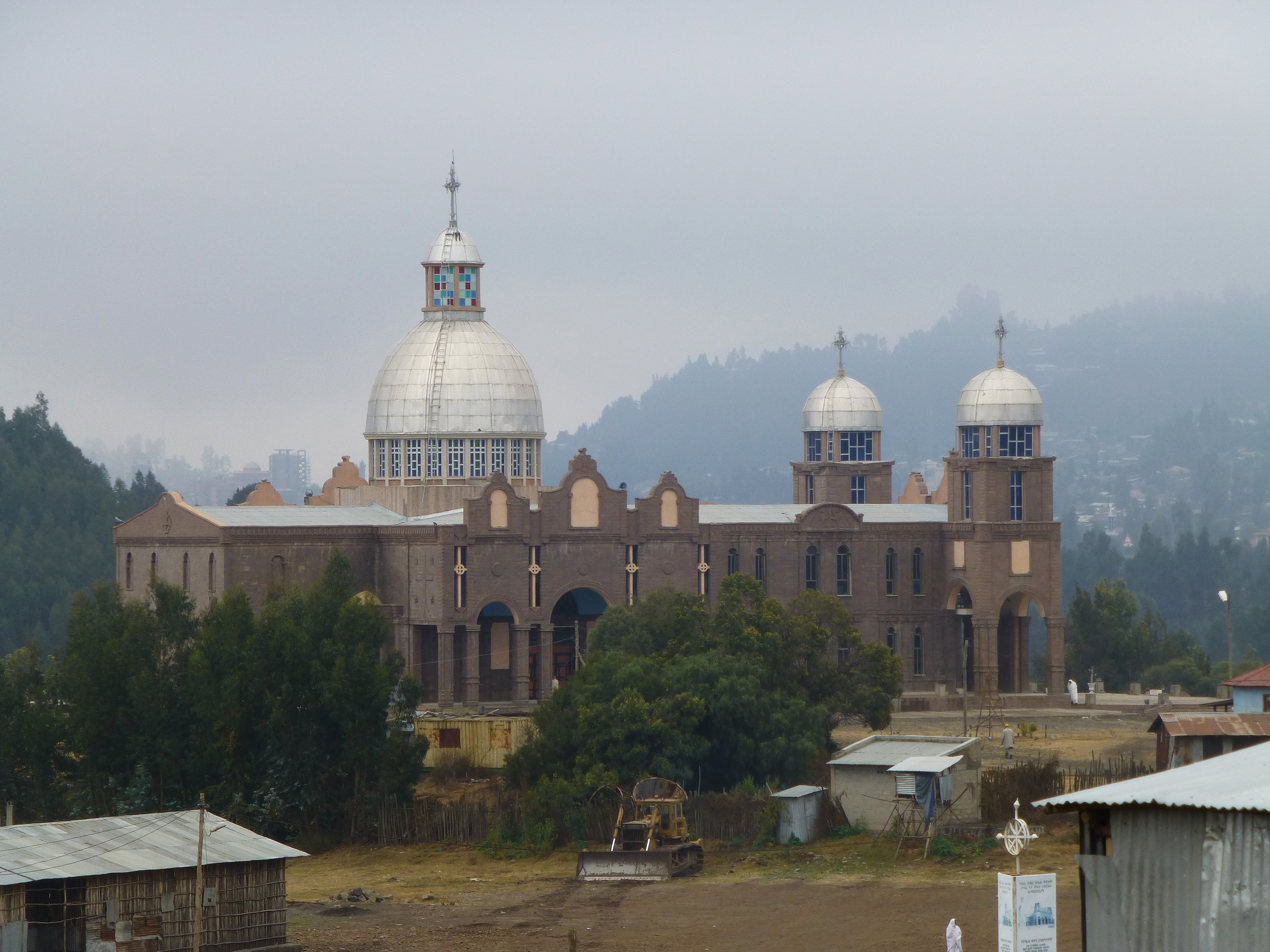
Saint Gabriel Orthodox Cathedral in Dessie

Traditionally, upon childbirth, a priest will visit the family to bless the infant. The mother and child remain in the house for 40 days after birth for physical and emotional strength. The infant will be taken to the church for baptism at 40 days (for boys) or 80 days (for girls).

== Economy ==
=== Manufacturing ===
There are several industrial parks that are in operation or under construction. The Kombolcha IP was built at a cost of $90 million and employs 20,000 people. Arerti IP and Debre Birhan IP are under construction.

=== Agriculture ===
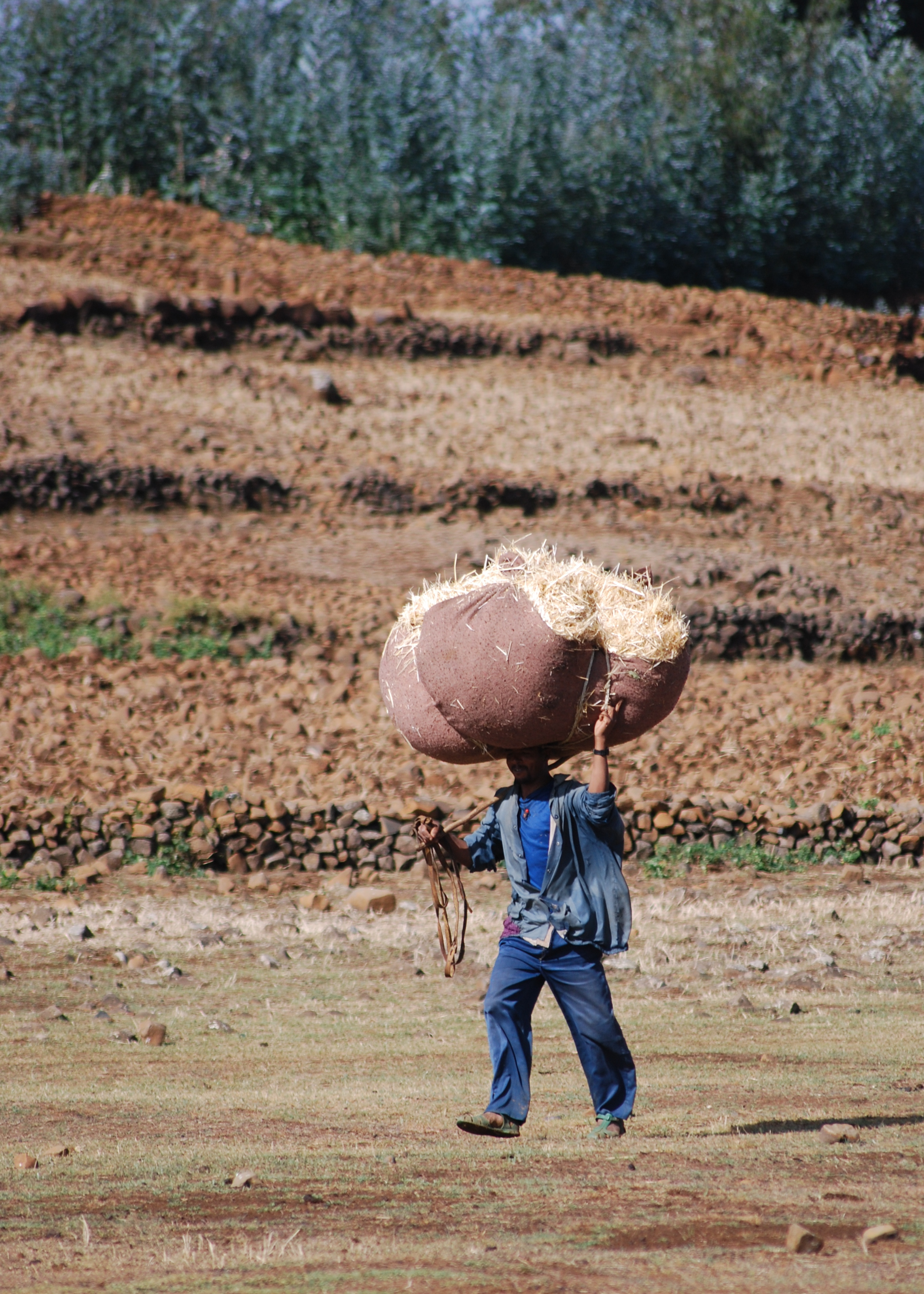
A farmer carrying hay from the fields to his home, Amhara

About 90% of the Amhara are rural and make their living through farming, mostly in the Ethiopian highlands. Barley, corn, millet, wheat, sorghum, and teff, along with beans, peppers, chickpeas, and other vegetables, are the most important crops. In the highlands one crop per year is normal, while in the lowlands two are possible. Cattle, sheep, and goats are also raised. The CSA of Ethiopia estimated in 2005 that farmers in Amhara had a total of 9,694,800 head of cattle (representing 25% of Ethiopia's total cattle), 6,390,800 sheep (36.7%), 4,101,770 goats (31.6%), 257,320 horses (17%), 8,900 mules (6%), 1,400,030 asses (55.9%), 14,270 camels (3.12%), 8,442,240 poultry of all species (27.3%), and 919,450 beehives (21.1%).

== Education ==
=== Public universities ===
There are ten public universities in Amhara Region

- Bahir Dar University, in Bahir Dar, established in 2001
- Debre Berhan University, in Debre Berhan, established in 2007
- Debre Markos University, in Debre Markos, established in 2007
- Injibara University, in Injibara, established in 2015
- Wollo University, in Dessie and Kombolcha, established in 2007
- University of Gondar, in Gondar, established in 1953
- Debre Tabor University, in Debre Tabor, established in 2008
- Woldia University, in Woldia, established in 2011
- Mekdela Amba University, in South Wollo, established in 2015
- Debark University, established in 2020
- Injibara University, Injibara, Established in 2020

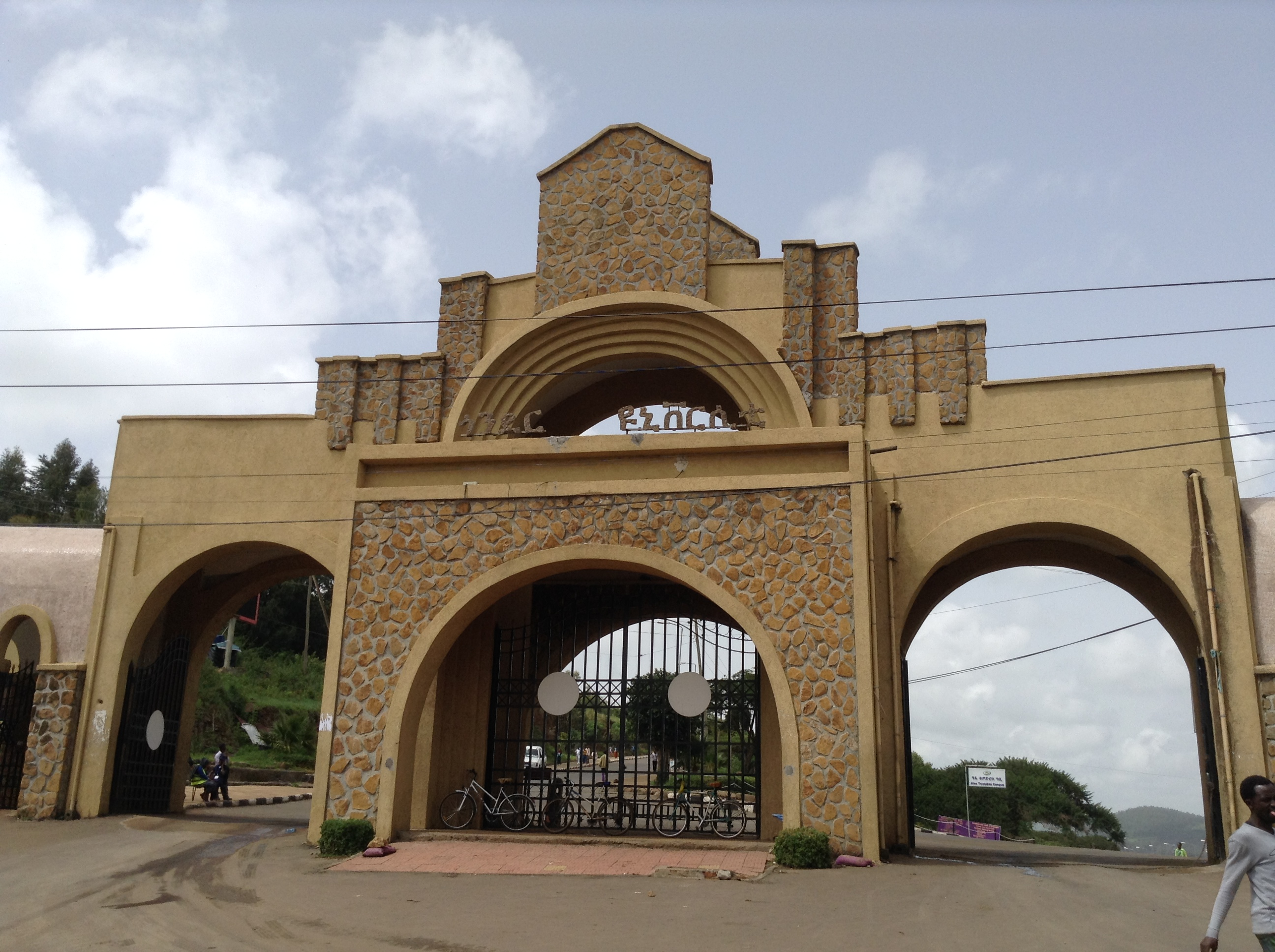
University of Gonder

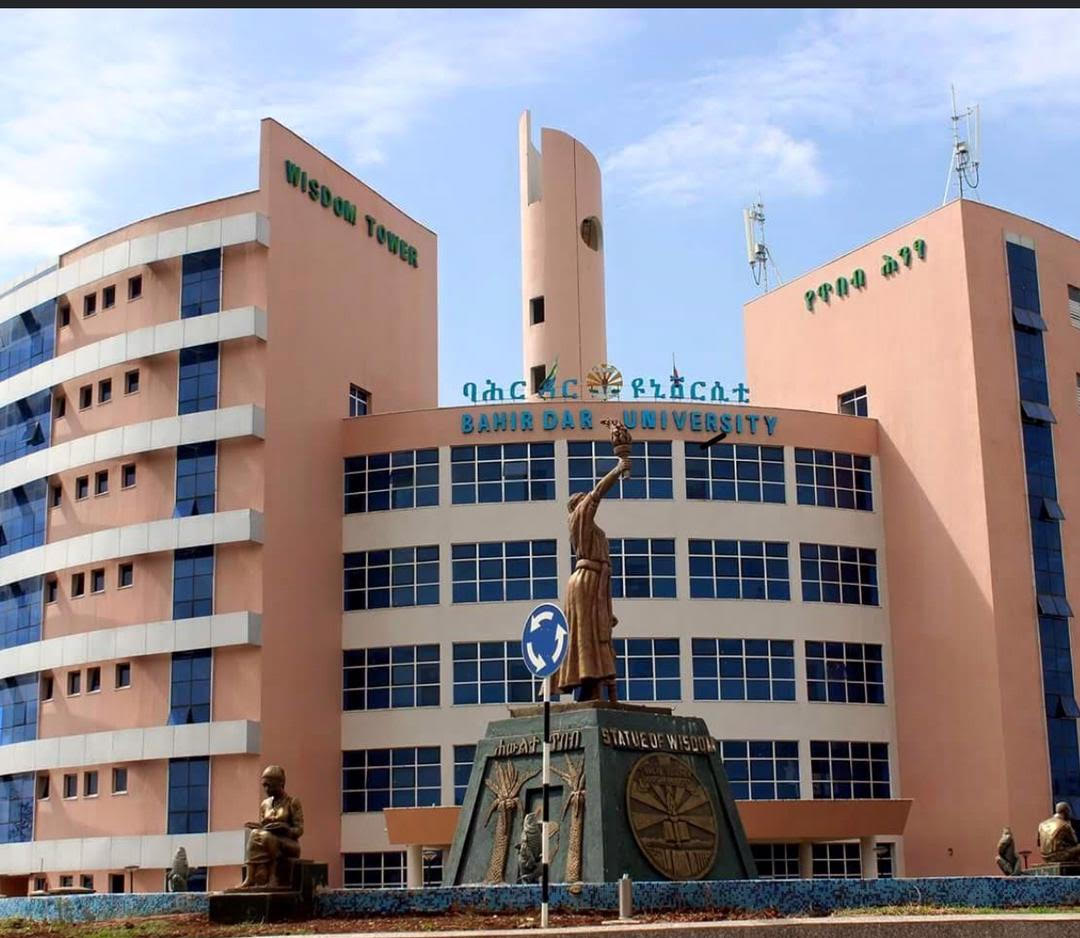
Bahir Dar University

== Government ==
The government of Amhara is composed of the executive branch, led by the President; the legislative branch, which comprises the State Council; and the judicial branch, which is led by the state Supreme Court.

=== Executive branch ===
The executive branch is headed by the Chief Administrator of Amhara Region. The current Chief Administrator is Yilikal Kefale, a Prosperity Party member who was elected on 30 September 2021. The current vice president is Alemnew Mekonnen. The other offices in the executive branch cabinet are the Regional Health Bureau (Dr. Abebaw Gebeyehu), Educational Bureau (Yilikal Kefyalew), and 20 other officials.

=== Judicial branch ===
There are three levels of the Amhara state judiciary. The lowest level is the court of common pleas: each woreda maintains its own constitutionally mandated court of common pleas, which maintain jurisdiction over all justiciable matters. The intermediate-level court system is the district court system. Four courts of appeals exist, each retaining jurisdiction over appeals from common pleas, municipal, and county courts in an administrative zone. A case heard in this system is decided by a three-judge panel, and each judge is elected.

The highest-ranking court, the Amhara Supreme Court, is Amhara's "court of last resort". A seven-justice panel composes the court, which, by its own discretion, hears appeals from the courts of appeals, and retains original jurisdiction over limited matters. The chief judge is called the President of Amhara Supreme Court (Yeneneh Simegn).

=== Legislative branch ===
The State Council, which is the highest administrative body of the state, is made up of 294 members.

=== National politics ===
Amhara is represented by 138 representatives in the Federal Democratic Republic of Ethiopia House of Peoples' Representatives.

=== Administrative zones ===
Like other regions in Ethiopia, Amhara is subdivided into administrative zones. There are 11 zones and 67 woredas.

Administrative Zones of the Amhara Region
Number	Zone	Area in km2	Population estimate 2022	Administrative Capital
1	Agew Awi Zone	9,148.43	1,077,144	Injibara
2	East Gojjam Zone	14,004.47	2,351,855	Debre Marqos
3	North Gondar Zone	45,944.63	2.929,628	Gondar
4	North Shewa Zone	15,936.13	1,837,490	Debre Birhan
5	North Wollo Zone	12,172.50	1,500,303	Weldiya
6	South Gondar Zone	14,095.19	2,051,738	Debre Tabor
7	South Wollo Zone	17,067.45	2,518,867	Dessie
8	Wag Hemra Zone	9,039.04	463,505	Sekota
9	West Gojjam Zone	13,311.94	2,106,596	Finote Selam
10	Bahir Dar Special Zone	213.44	474,743	Bahir Dar

== Culture ==
The Aholalo is a festival celebrated in the northern region of Ethiopia. The festival is traditionally celebrated in the province of Wollo.

== See also ==
- List of districts in the Amhara region
- Amhara region coup d'état attempt
- Amhara people
