= MAU =

MAU may refer to:

== Computing ==
- Media access unit (or multistation access unit), A Token Ring network interconnect device
- Medium Attachment Unit, an Ethernet network transceiver
- Monthly active users, a software performance metric

== Places ==
- Mauritania, UNDP country code
- Mauritius, ITU country code
- MAU, National Rail code for Mauldeth Road railway station in Manchester, UK

== Organizations ==
- Marathwada Agricultural University, now Vasantrao Naik Marathwada Krishi Vidyapeeth, an agriculture university in Parbhani, India
- Mekdela Amba University, in Ethiopia
- Mizhnarodni Avialiniyi Ukrayiny (Ukraine International Airlines)
- Musashino Art University, a university in Japan
- Mount Allison University, a university in New Brunswick, Canada

== Other uses ==
- mAU (milli-absorbance unit), used to measure absorbance
- Marine amphibious unit, now Marine expeditionary unit, the smallest air-ground task force in the United States Fleet Marine Force
- Makeup air unit, a type of air handler that only conditions outside (not recirculated) air
- Medical Assessment Unit, a short-stay hospital department in some countries

== See also ==
- Mau (disambiguation)
