= Mau Mau =

Mau Mau may refer to:

- The Kenya Land and Freedom Army, an anti-colonial force
  - The Mau Mau rebellion, Kenya, 1950s
- Mau Mau Island or White Island, Brooklyn, New York City, US
- Mau Mau (game), a card game
- Gallery Mau Mau, Cape Town, South Africa
- The Mau Maus, a 1950s New York City street gang
- Mau Mau, a 1973 documentary film of The Black Man's Land Trilogy

== In music ==
- Mau Mau (band), Italy
- The Mau Maus, a Hollywood, California, US, band
- Mau Maus, a fictional hip hop group in the 2000 film Bamboozled

== See also ==
- Mau (disambiguation)
- Radical Chic & Mau-Mauing the Flak Catchers, a 1970 book by Tom Wolfe
