= Mawe =

Mawe or Mawé may refer to:

- Mawé, Burkina Faso, a town
- Mawé people, an indigenous people of Brazil
- Mawé language, language of the Mawé people
- Mano language, language of the Mano people

== People with the name ==
- Leonard Mawe (1550s–1629), English bishop
- John Mawe (1764–1829), English mineralogist
- Sarah Mawe (1767–1846), English mineralogist
