= Maus (surname) =

Maus is a surname. Notable people with the name include:

- August Maus (1915–1996), German U-boat commander
- Codey Maus (born 1985), Canadian curler
- Guido Maus (born 1964), Belgian-born American art curator and collector
- Jacques Maus (1905–unknown), Belgian bob-sledder
- John Maus (born 1980), American musician and composer
- John Joseph Maus (1943–2011), American singer, songwriter and guitarist, known as John Walker of The Walker Brothers
- John R. Maus, pilot of Northwest Airlines Flight 255
- Julius Maus (1906–1934), German cyclist
- Marcela Maus, American immunologist
- Octave Maus (1856–1919), Belgian art critic, writer, and lawyer
- Robert Maus (1933–2025), German politician
- Rodger Maus (1932–2017), American art director

== See also ==
- Maus (disambiguation)
