= Maus (disambiguation) =

Maus is a series of Pulitzer Prize–winning graphic novel style books written by Art Spiegelman.

Maus may also refer to:

- Maus (band), an Icelandic rock band
- Maus Castle, a castle in Rhineland-Palatinate, Germany
- MAUS mine, an Italian designed anti-personnel scatter mine
- Maus Frères (Maus Brothers), Swiss holding company
- Die Sendung mit der Maus, a children's television show from Germany
- Panzer VIII Maus, a German World War II super-heavy tank
- Maus (surname), the surname of a list of notable people

== See also ==
- Mau (disambiguation)
- Maws (disambiguation)
- Mous (disambiguation)
- Herbert De Maus (1871–1929), New Zealand cricketer
- Die Fledermaus (The Bat), a comic operetta in three acts by Johann Strauss II
- DarkMaus, a video game
