= Aholalo =

Cultural festival celebrated by Amhara people in Ethiopia

Aholalo አሆላሎ
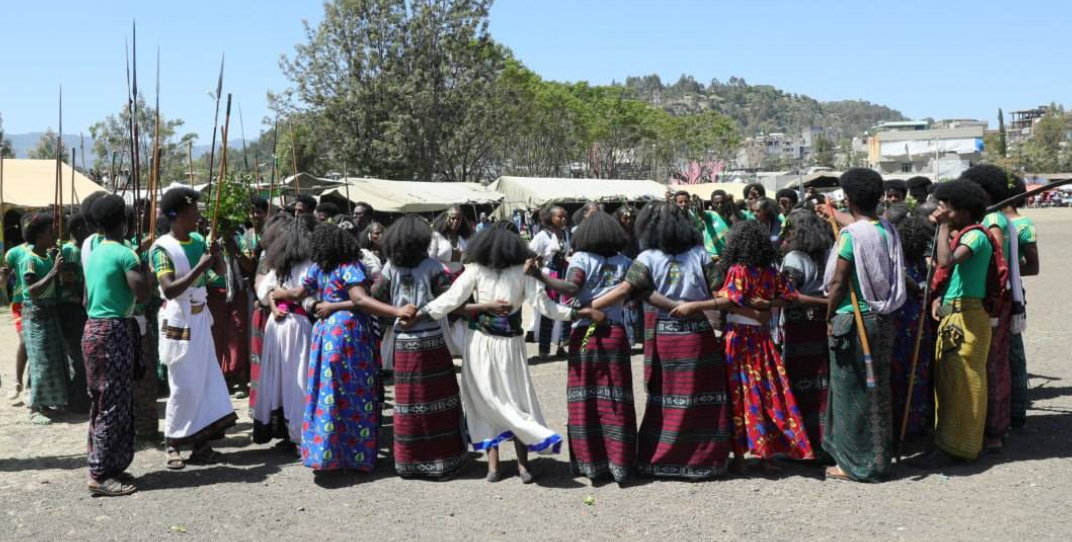
- Official name: Aholalo
- Observed by: Amhara, Ethiopia
- Type: Cultural
- Celebrations: Community gathering; Matchmaking; Cultural performance
- Frequency: Annual

Aholalo (Amharic: አሆላሎ) is a festival celebrated in the Amhara region of Northern Ethiopia near the end of January, equivalent to between the 17th and 21st of the month of Tir. The festival originates from, and is celebrated in the Wollo (Amharic: ወሎ, formerly known as Bete Amhara, [Amharic: ቤተ አማራ, Ge'ez: ቤተ ዐምሐራ, translation: “House of Amhara”]) province of Eastern Amhara.

Aholalo was originally a tradition Welloyes (people of the Wollo province) practiced in which a male may throw a lime at a woman he is attracted to. If the woman keeps the lime, that means she reciprocates the attraction; if she throws the lime back, that means she is not interested. Additionally, if another male throws a lime at her and she keeps it, the two (or more) men must engage in a civilized wrestling match. There are many more traditions practiced during this time, but the matchmaking is at the heart of it all. These traditions evolved into a larger festival, particularly famous in the city Hayk (Amharic: ሐይቅ), South Wollo.

Aholalo is enjoyed by both Muslims and Christians in Wollo, a region with intense unity, friendship, and intermarriage between both faiths. Many more than simply the following traditions are observed during the Aholalo festival, but these are among the most central elements.

== Matchmaking Process ==
Lime throwing is also a tradition done during Timket, which is a religious holiday famous in Gonder, a different province in the Amhara region. However, the culture of men throwing limes originates from the tradition of Aholalo. The full tradition is observed in Wollo, where there are also wrestling matches in competition for women. Any woman interested in marriage proposals, while singing together in a circle (see songs section below), will slowly move to the circle’s centre. If she catches the attention of a male, he will toss her a lime; she can accept as many proposals as she likes. Also, the woman may be given a lime, and then all of the interested men may ask her for it by saying “ere bakish” (Amharic: ኧረ ባክሽ), in which she may choose to give the lime to the man she fancies most. If the woman has multiple proposals by the end, the men will engage in a wrestling match. The winner is then allowed to send elderly men (Amharic: ሽማግሌ) to ask for her hand in marriage.

== Adornments ==
Hair:
The intricacies of Habesha hairstyles are much more complex than can be delved into here. However, in order to understand the hairstyles most commonly worn during Aholalo, you must consider the age demographics participating in this festival. The festival’s root is a matchmaking tradition, meaning most of the active participants are young, unmarried girls, although older women lead the different call-and-response songs. Therefore, one common shuruba (traditional Habesha braiding style) is called “gamme” (Amharic: ጋሜ). The women also put butter (Amharic: ቅቤ) on their hair, a tradition particularly famous in Wollo.

Jewelry:
A piece of jewelry from the Wollo region - usually worn by young girls - is called “fessese” (Amharic: ፈሰሴ). It is a necklace that comes in many forms depending on the area in Wollo, but it is always characterized by a bundle of ropes (beaded or unbeaded) that is attached to a leather or metal necklace. This bundle is meant to be positioned from the side, not at the bottom like a regular necklace. Many other jewelry pieces are worn by men and women, including necklaces called gubagub (Amharic: ጉባጉብ) and dimbel (ድምብል), and armlets called ambar (Amharic: አምባር) and dekot (Amharic: ድኮት), amongst others.

Dresses:
There are many tilf (Amharic: ጥልፍ, translation: “embroidery”) and clothing styles originating from Wollo also worn during this celebration, including the Lakomelza Qemis, Tiftif Qemis, Shirit, and Korta Qemis, as well as Wollo style Mekenet’s. A tell-tale feature of Welloye dresses in general, though, are the blue and grey butter dyes, clearly indicating their origin. Another easy marker of a Wollo Qemis is the embroidery all along the back of the dress, starting from the waist down, and is called Tiftif.

Plants:
Wollo is famous for its aromatic plants, and is well-known for a tradition called weyba-tis (Amharic: ወይባ ጢስ). It is a smoke bath using various Wollo-local plants, weyba being extremely common, hence the name. Variations of the smoke bath culture exist to a limited degree outside of Amhara, but none nearly as ubiquitous or as famous as Wollo’s where the culture is most vernacular; Wollo also has a unique diversity of native aromatic plants that contribute to it being the epicenter of weyba-tis, as the name weyba (an aromatic plant associated with Wollo) clearly illustrates. The women also extensively decorate themselves with these different plants, especially in their hair. Some common plants that the girls in Wollo use for adornment and aromatics include Ashkuti (red in colour, Amharic: አሽኩቲ), Ariti (white in colour, most commonly put behind the ears, Amharic: አሪቲ), Natra (Amharic: ናትራ), Ades (a green leaf, Amharic: አደስ), and Tej Sar (long and grass-like in appearance, Amharic: ጠጅ ሳር). They also enjoy adorning their hair with cotton (Amharic: ጥጥ) by separating it and having it cling all over their hair.

Men:
Men in Wollo wear a clothing item called a Shirit (Amharic: ሽርጥ), which is a colorful, skirt-like piece that is secured around the waist, or a gildim (Amharic: ግልድም), which is worn similarly, but is made of a heavier fabric type and is decorated with traditional Amhara embroidery; the dege (wrapped around the abdomen) and erob (wrapped around shoulders), are also usually worn with a gildim. Depending on the region, different styles of blades may be worn. The men also carry a stick (mewat dula, Amharic: መዋት ዱላ) that has many purposes, including dances, self-defence etc., as often they adapt the top end of the stick for more utilitarian purposes (i.e., adding a small blade.) Men wear their hair in afros (Amharic: ጎፈሬ), where a small lump of butter is put on top. They also wear khul eyeliner, especially on their bottom eyelid, as well as a dot on their forehead between their brows. Welloye women also have unique face tattoo designs (Amharic: ንቅሳት or ዉቅራት), which cover the neck, chin, and forehead in particular.

== Songs ==
The women usually all hook arms and form a circle where they slowly rotate while singing. Often, an older woman will lead these songs in a "call and response" fashion, where she sings a line or phrase, and the rest of the girls either repeat, or sing a different line or phrase. This style of song is extremely common throughout Amhara. Below are three short melodies, the first sung as an insult to cowardly men, the second sung to heroic men, and the third sung more generally as the women are dancing in a circle.

የፈሪ መሳደብያ:
ሆአሎ ናሆላሎ፣
ወንድ ነኝ ብሎ ተዉሶ ጋሻ
ሰጣት ለእናቱ ላመድ ማፈሻ።
ወንድ ነኝ ብሎ ተዉሶ ጦር
ሰጠው ለኣባቱ ለቤት ማገር።
ምንታደርጋለህ ከሰምበሌጡ
ባልእንጀሮችህ ገለው ሲመጡ።

ለጀግና መኩሪያ:
ሆአሎ ናሆላሎ፣
የጀግና ወዳጅ ታስታውቃለች፣
እራሷን በአደስ አምዳዋለች፣
እራሷን በአደስ አምዳ አምዳ፣
ያላሰበዉን ዶለችው ሄዳ።

ሴቶቹ ክብ ሲሰሩ:
አሆሚሌሆ አሆሚሌሄ ያላሄ አሆሚሌሄ
ከሰማይ በላይ ሚሌሄ ሀርሽ ነው ሀርሽ
አሆሚሌሄ ያላሄ አሆሚሌሄ
አሪቲ ገላ ሆምሌ ሎሚ ትንፋሽ።

== See also ==
- Wollo Province
