= Mous =

Mous may refer to:

== People ==
- Mirjam Mous (born 1963), Dutch children's author
- Xavier Mous (born 1995), Dutch footballer
- Mous Lamrabat (born 1983), Belgian photographer of Moroccan descent

== Other uses ==
- Microsoft Office User Specialist

== See also ==
- MOU (disambiguation)
- Maus (disambiguation)
