= MAW =

MAW may refer to:

- Malawi, a republic in southeast Africa
- Make-A-Wish Foundation, a U.S. charity
- Marine Aircraft Wing, the largest aviation unit in the United States Marine Corps
- Masters at Work, the house music producers "Little" Louie Vega and Kenny "Dope" González
- Men at Work, an Australian pop band
- Mexican–American War, between the U.S. and Mexico in 1846–1848
- Missile approach warning system, aircraft equipment to detect an approaching anti-aircraft missile
- Mission Adaptive Wing, Adaptive compliant wing for aircraft which can change form
- Modified Atlantic Water, water flowing from the Atlantic Ocean into the Mediterranean through the Alboran Sea

== See also ==
- Maw (disambiguation)
