= Mawes =

Mawes may refer to:

- Saint Maudez, known in Cornwall as Mauwes, a Breton saint
- St Mawes, a town in Cornwall, England
- Mawes language, a Papuan language of Indonesia

== See also ==
- Maws (disambiguation)
- Maves
