= James Tennant (mineralogist) =

British mineralogist (1808–1881)

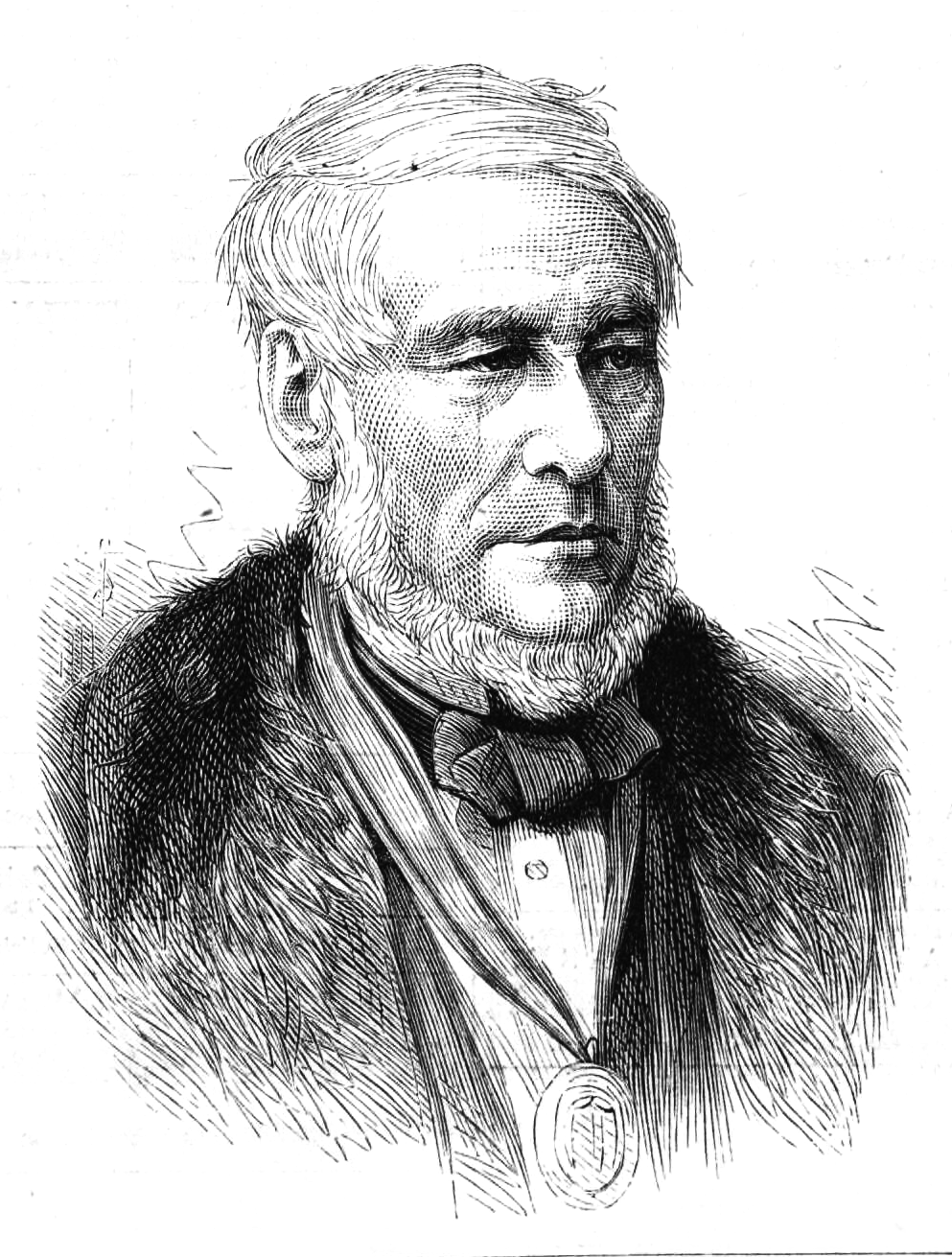
- Born: 8 February 1808; Upton, Nottinghamshire, England
- Died: 23 February 1881 (aged 73); London, England
- Citizenship: British
- Scientific career
- Fields: Mineralogy
- Workplaces: King's College London, Geological Society, RMA

James Tennant (8 February 1808 – 23 February 1881) was an English mineralogist, the master of the Worshipful Company of Turners and mineralogist to Queen Victoria.

== Biography ==
Tennant was born on 8 February 1808 at Upton, near Southwell, Nottinghamshire. He was the third child in a family of twelve. His father, John Tennant, was an officer in Her Majesty's Customs and Excise; his mother, Eleanor Kitchen, came from a family of yeomen resident at Upton for more than two centuries. His parents later moved to Derby, and Tennant attended a school in Mansfield, Nottinghamshire.

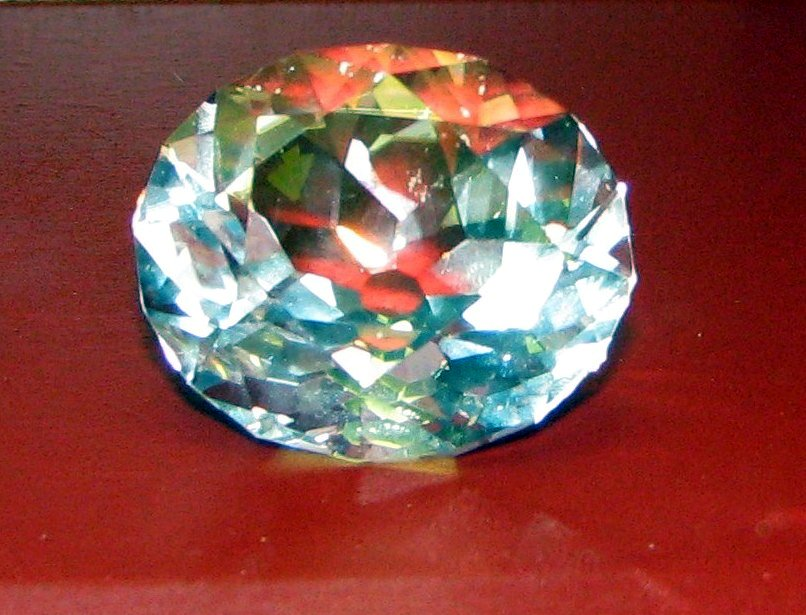
Diamond copy of the famous Koh-i-Noor in its current cut, which was supervised by Tennant

In October 1824, Tennant was apprenticed to John Mawe, a dealer in minerals at 149 Strand in London. After Mawe's death in 1829, Tennant managed the business with Mawe's widow, Sarah Mawe, who became known as "Mineralogist to Her Majesty". He purchased Sarah's share of the business on her retirement in 1840.

Tennant attended classes at a mechanics' institute and the lectures of Michael Faraday at the Royal Institution in London. In 1838, on Faraday's recommendation, Tennant was appointed teacher of geological mineralogy at King's College London, later a professor. In 1853 the professorship of geology was added, but he resigned that post in 1869, retaining the other till his death. From 1850 to 1867, Tennant was also a lecturer on geology and mineralogy at the Royal Military Academy, Woolwich. Tennant had an excellent practical knowledge of minerals; when diamonds were first found in South Africa, Tennant verified that they were indeed genuine.

Tennant was an earnest advocate of technical education, giving his own money liberally to help, and persuading the Turners' Company, of which he was master in 1874, to offer prizes for excellence in their craft. When the Koh-i-Noor diamond was recut, Tennant superintended the work In 1840, he becoming mineralogist to Queen Victoria in 1840, taking over from Sarah Mawe Tennant also had oversight of Miss Burdett-Coutts's collection of minerals.

Tennant was elected a fellow of the Geological Society in 1838, and president of the Geologists' Association (1862–3).

Tennant died in London on 23 February 1881. He never married.

A portrait of Tennant, painted by Rogers, was in the collection of Lady Burdett-Coutts. A copy was placed in the Strand vestry in commemoration of his services to the church schools and parish.

== Works ==
Tennant wrote the following books or pamphlets:

- List of British Fossils, 1847.
- Gems and Precious Stones, 1852.
- Catalogue of British Fossils in the Author's Collection, 1858.
- Description of the Imperial State Crown, 1858.
- Descriptive Catalogue of Gems, &c., bequeathed to the South Kensington Museum by the Rev. Chauncy Hare Townshend, (1870).
- Descriptive Catalogue of Diamonds in Europe, 1870.

He also, in conjunction with David Thomas Ansted and Walter Mitchell, contributed Geology, Mineralogy, and Crystallography to Orr's Circle of Sciences in 1855. He also produced two or three scientific papers, one on the Koh-i-Noor.
