= John Mawe =

British mineralogist (1764–1829)

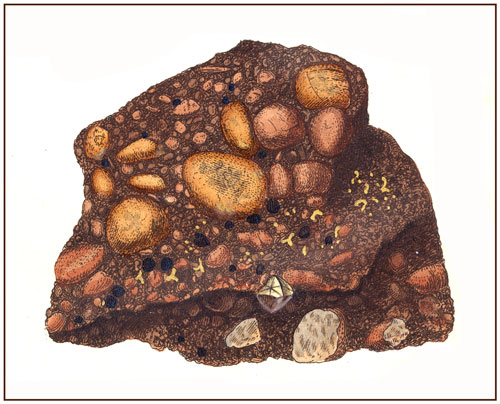
- Gold and Diamonds - from John Mawe's 1812 book Travels in the Interior of Brazil illustrated by James Sowerby
- Born: 1764; Derbyshire, England
- Died: 26 October 1829 (aged 64–65); London, England
- Citizenship: British
- Scientific career
- Fields: Mineralogy
- Workplaces: RGSC

John Mawe (1764 – 26 October 1829) was a British mineralogist who became known for his practical approach to the discipline.

== Biography ==
Mawe was born in Derby in 1764 to Samuel Maw(e). His mother died when he was ten and he was raised by his father's second wife, Francis (born Beigton). In early life he appears to have spent fifteen years at sea. In 1790, he became captain of the merchant vessel Trent, trading to Saint Petersburg.

In 1793, Mawe was apprenticed to the Derby mason Richard Brown (1736–1816), and married his daughter, Sarah, on 1 November 1794. Brown & Mawe was the name of the retail business near Covent Garden in 1797 which sold objects created from Derbyshire marble at the factory in Derby. Mawe was manager of this business. This business was established in 1794. Geological diagrams of Derbyshire strata which are made from Derbyshire minerals were once thought to have all been created by White Watson but it is now thought likely that some of these objects in Derby Museum were actually created by Mawe & Brown.

About the end of the century he made a tour of most of the mines in England and Scotland, collecting minerals for the cabinet of the king of Spain. In 1800 he owned the Royal Museums spar shop in Matlock Bath which, through his agent, he was to enter into dispute with Thomas Pearson concerning surrounding mines.

In August 1804 he started on a "voyage of commercial experiment" to Rio de la Plata funded by Portugal's Prince Regent. His missions was to assess the value of the gold and diamond industries that might revitalize Brazil's ailing economy. Mawe had reached Cádiz when war broke out between England and Spain, and he was blockaded in the town where he was taken ill and nearly died. He sailed from Cádiz in March 1805 for Montevideo, and on reaching that town was imprisoned as an English spy. He procured his liberty soon after, but was interned, and did not obtain his release till the capture of Montevideo by William Beresford in 1806. He accompanied the expedition under John Whitelocke to Buenos Aires, and on his return to Montevideo purchased a schooner and sailed to Brazil, putting in at various ports on the way, including the island of Santa Catarina. He was well received in Brazil by the prince regent, who gave him permission to visit the diamond mines of Minas Gerais and other parts of the interior during 1809–10, and also granted him access to the government archives.

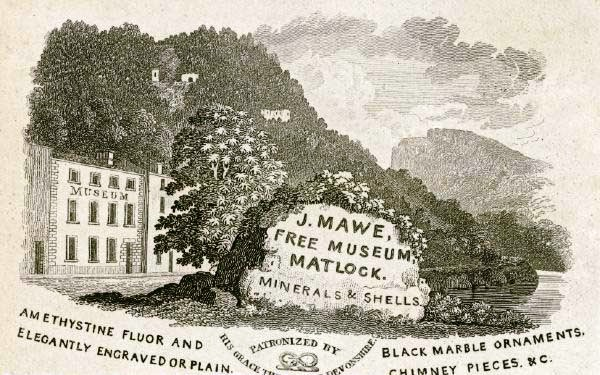
J Mawe's Museum at Matlock Bath.

Mawe returned to London in 1811, and opening a shop in The Strand, close to Somerset House, became well known as a practical mineralogist. In 1813 he was elected to the Royal Geological Society of Cornwall, and in 1817 he received the diploma of the Jena Mineralogischen Gesellschaft.

Mawe and his wife Sarah had two children, a son and a daughter. Their son, John Saint Mawe (1797–1820), died aged 22; Sarah requested in her will that she be buried beside him. Their daughter married Anthony Tissington Tatlow (1789–1828), who became a partner of Mawe's in a shop in Cheltenham in 1816.

Mawe died in London on 26 October 1829. A tablet to his memory is in Castleton church, Derbyshire. His business was carried on by James Tennant the mineralogist, in partnership with Mawe's widow Sarah until 1840. Sarah Mawe had the title of "Mineralogist to Her Majesty" until she retired.

== Works ==
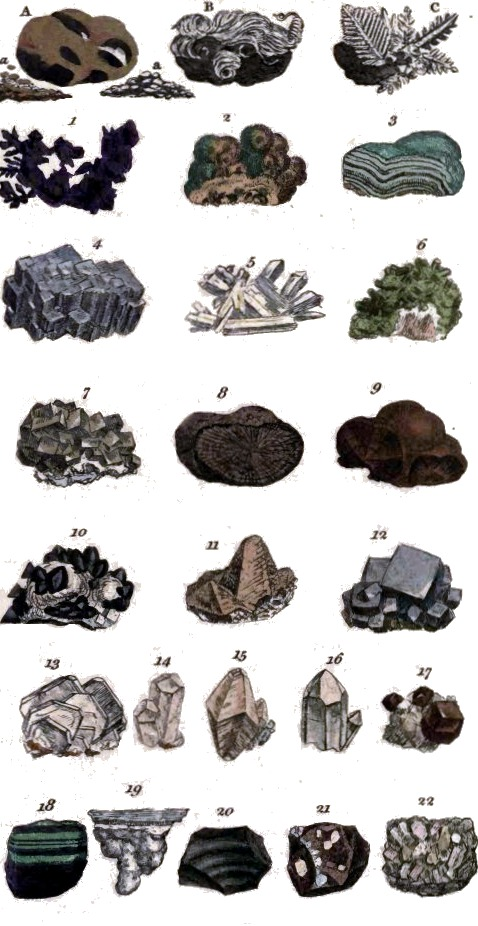
James Sowerby & sons illustration in the 1821 third edition of Familiar Lessons on Mineralogy and Geology

Mawe's principal work was the account of his South American voyage, Travels in the Interior of Brazil, London, 1812; Philadelphia, 1816; 2nd edition, 1823.

He also wrote:

1. The Mineralogy of Derbyshire, 1802.
2. A Treatise on Diamonds and Precious Stones, 1813; 2nd ed. 1823.
3. A Catalogue of Minerals, 1815.
4. A Descriptive Catalogue of Minerals, 1816; 4th edit. 1821; reissued in 1823.
5. Familiar Lessons on Mineralogy and Geology, 1819; 10th edit. 1828.
6. Amateur Lapidary's Guide, 3rd edit. 1823; 1827.
7. Instructions for the use of the Blow-pipe and Chemical Tests, 4th edit. 1825.
8. The Voyager's Companion or Shell-Collector's Pilot, 1821; 4th edit. 1825.
9. The Linnæan System of Conchology, 1823.

He edited the 2nd edit. of Wodarch's Introduction to Conchology, 1822, and wrote a paper on The Occurrence of Diamonds, &c., in Brazil for Gilbert's Annalen lix. (1818), besides one On the Tourmaline and Apatite of Devonshire for the Quart. Journ. of Science, iv. (1818). He appears also to have issued at some time Directions to Captains of Ships, Officers, and Travellers; particularly to those engaged in the South Sea Fishery (for collecting shells). A manuscript paper On a Gold Mine in South America is preserved in the library of the Geological Society.

A number of Mawe's publications were extensively illustrated by James Sowerby and his sons, who specialised in detailed colour plates.
