= Gualdino Mauro =

Santomean footballer

Personal information
- Full name: Gualdino Mauro dos Santos Barreto
- Date of birth: 13 July 2000 (age 26)
- Place of birth: São Tomé, São Tomé and Príncipe
- Height: 1.83 m (6 ft 0 in)
- Position: Winger

Team information
- Current team: Fabril

Youth career
- 2018–2019: Belenenses
- 2019–2020: Cova da Piedade

Senior career*
Years	Team	Apps	(Gls)
2020–	Fabril	2	(0)

International career^{‡}
2020–	São Tomé and Príncipe	3	(0)
- * Club domestic league appearances and goals as of 00:11, 26 March 2021 (UTC) ‡ National team caps and goals as of 00:11, 26 March 2021 (UTC)

Gualdino Mauro dos Santos Barreto (born 13 July 2000), sometimes known as Maú, is a Santomean footballer who plays as a winger for Fabril and the São Tomé and Príncipe national team.

== International career ==
Gualdino Mauro made his professional debut with the São Tomé and Príncipe national team in a 1–0 2021 Africa Cup of Nations qualification loss to Ghana on 18 November 2019.
