= Maw & Co =

British manufacturer of ceramic tiles

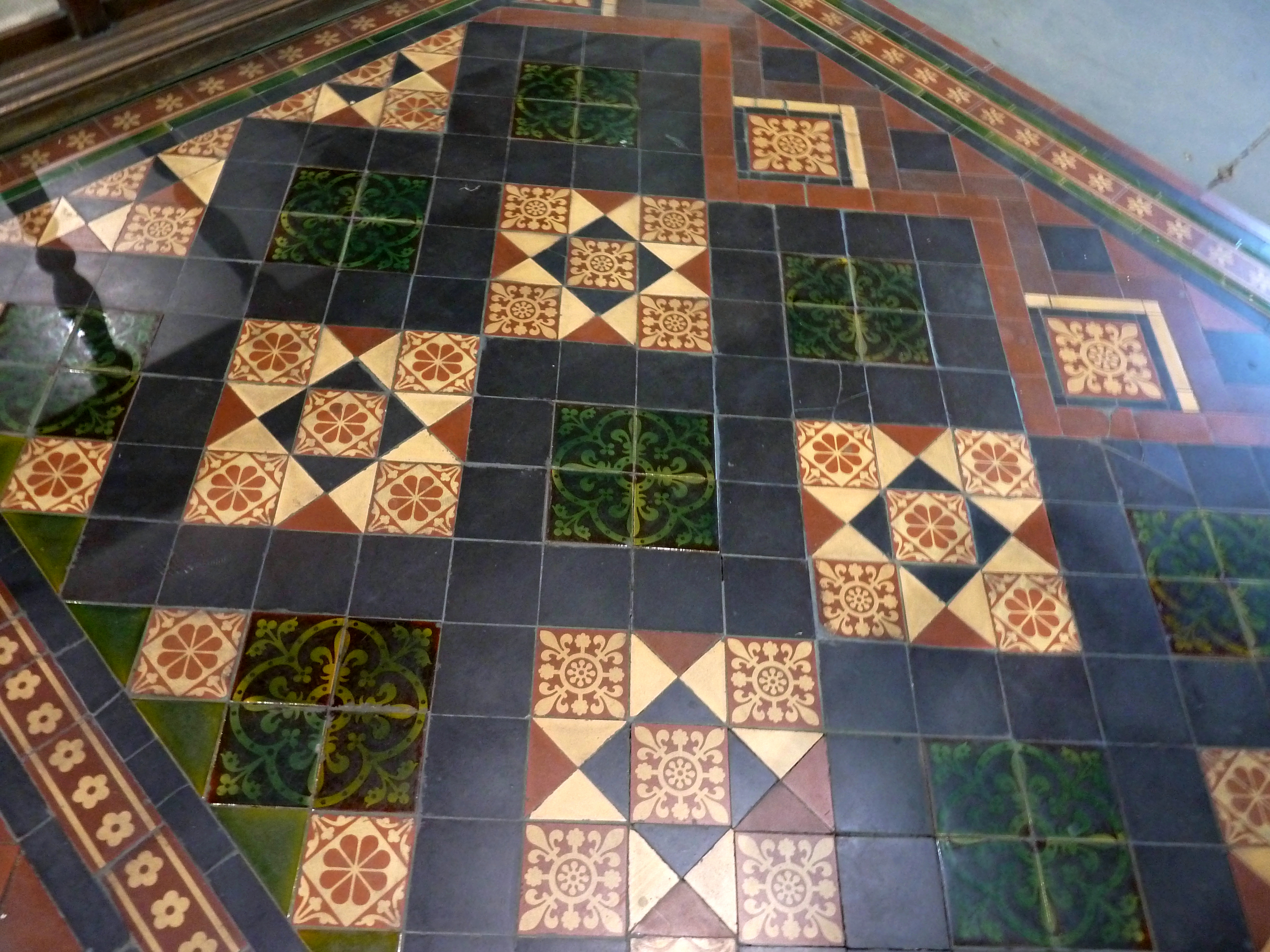
- Type: Private Limited Company
- Industry: Manufacture of ceramic tiles
- Founded: 1850 in Worcester, England
- Founder: George Maw; Arthur Maw
- Headquarters: England
- Area served: Worldwide
- Website: mawandco.com

Maw & Co have made earthenware encaustic tiles for walls and floors since 1850, when the English company was established by George Maw and his brother Arthur. Their first factory was in Worcester, and in 1852 the company moved to Broseley, Shropshire in the Ironbridge Gorge. In 1883 they moved to the Benthall Works in Jackfield, Shropshire. The new, purpose-built factory was the largest tile works in the world and the company was the world's largest producer of ceramic tiles, making more than 20 million pieces a year.

The range of tiles was expanded over the years and included relief tiles, encaustic tiles, mosaic tiles, transfer printed tiles and hand-painted picture tiles. Designs included Art Nouveau and Art Deco geometric designs. In the 1890s Maw & Co started making high quality art pottery.

== History ==
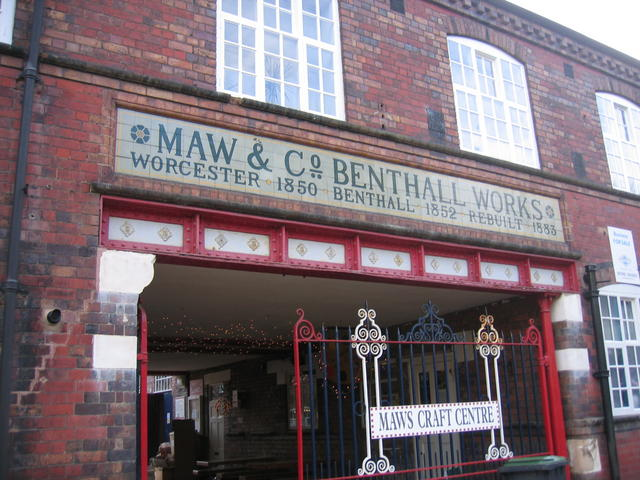
Maw and Co's Benthall Works

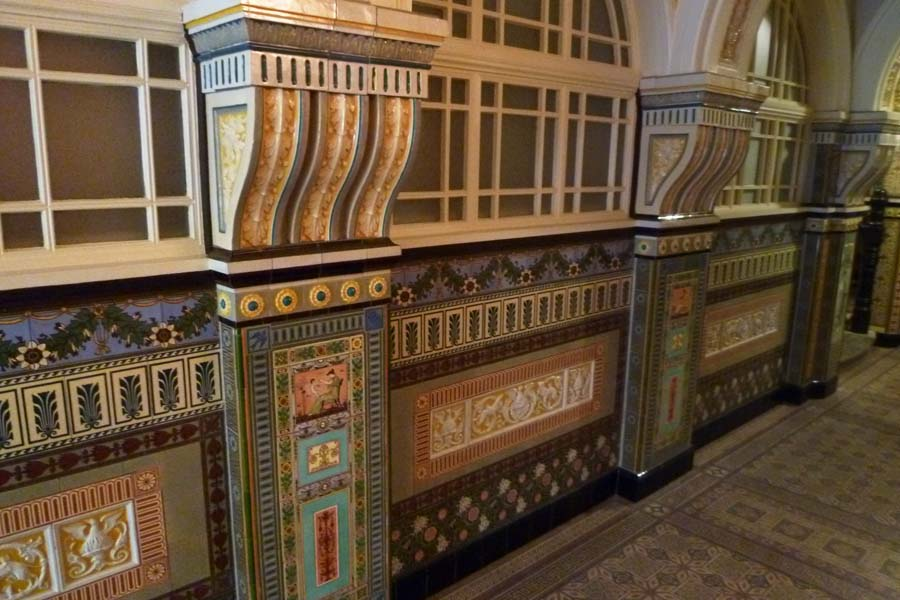
Tiled corridor of Cardiff Old Library (1882)

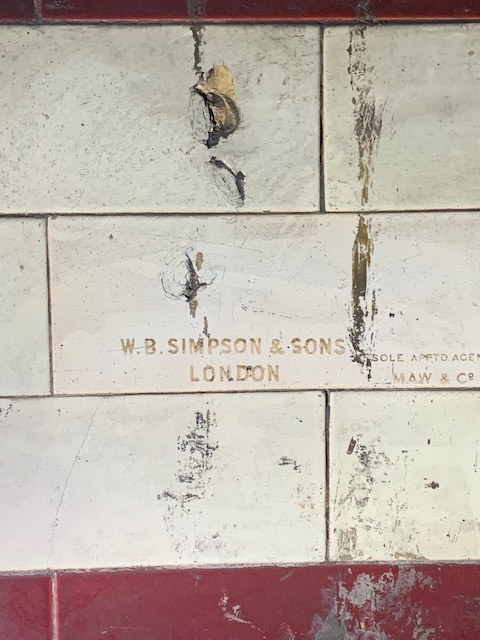
Maker's tile by Maw & Co from 1907 at Down Street station, Mayfair, London (2023)

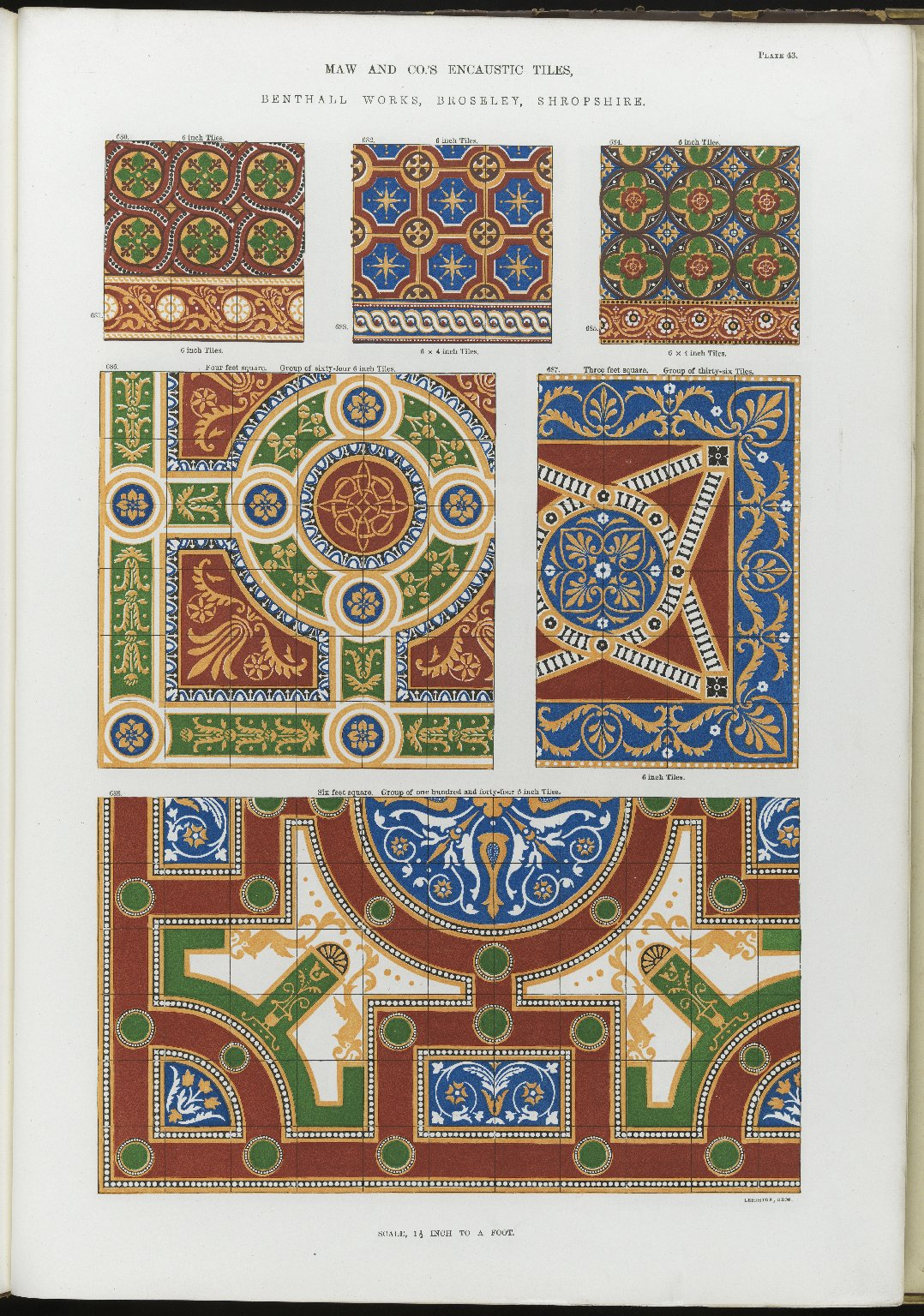
A page from an 1867 catalogue of Maw and Co.'s designs

Maw & Co was established in Worcester in 1850 by brothers George and Arthur Maw. Their father, John Hornby Maw (1800 – 1885), felt that the tile industry would be a good business opportunity for his sons as it combined their artistic talents with their entrepreneurial skills. In 1849 he bought the Encaustic Tile Works in Worcester which had been established by the Worcester Porcelain Company.

They quickly gained a high reputation for their 'mock-mediaeval' encaustic floor tiles. The local clays were unsuitable and clay from Shropshire was brought in at great expense. In 1852 the company moved to Broseley, Shropshire, in the Ironbridge Gorge to take advantage of the good-quality local clay in the area. The company barely covered its expenses until full commercial production was reached in 1857, but within a few years encaustic tiles became the height of fashion and the company prospered afterwards. By 1861 Maw & Co employed a work force of 83 (45 men, 17 women and 21 boys). The company continued to prosper and by 1880 had grown to be the largest producer of ceramic tiles in the world, making more than 20 million pieces a year. In May 1883 they moved to the Benthall Works at Jackfield, Shropshire. The new purpose-built factory covered an area of 5 acres (2.0 ha) and was the largest tile works in the world.

In 1858 an agreement was made with W. B. Simpson & Son Ltd appointing them as sole agent for the company in the area covered by the London postal district. They went on to win a £100,000 contract with Underground Electric Railways Company of London to supply Maw & Co tiling in construction of stations across three lines.

Maw & Co have supplied ceramic wall and floor tiles to some of the world’s most prestigious buildings. In Maw’s printed catalogues the 'Lists of persons and establishments supplied' ran to five pages and included the British royal family, Alexander II of Russia, maharajas, dukes, earls, railway companies, cathedrals, hospitals, public buildings, schools and colleges, and even warships. Maw and Co won many awards at international exhibitions including those in London (1862), Paris (1867), Philadelphia (1876) and Adelaide (1887).

The recession that followed World War I, building restrictions and railway closures were all detrimental to the tile industry. In 1960 Maw & Co merged with Campbell Tiles and In 1968 the Campbell-Maw Company was absorbed into the H & R Johnson group. Maw & Co closed down in January 1970.

Maw & Co Limited was re-established as a private company on 27 June 2001. In March 2008 the company was acquired by new management. Encaustic and geometric floor tiles, and replica Victorian decorative wall tiles, are produced using traditional craft skills. Replica tiles of other leading 19th century makers, such as Minton, Campbell, and Malkin, are also produced.

The Company was dissolved on January 15, 2019.

== Products ==
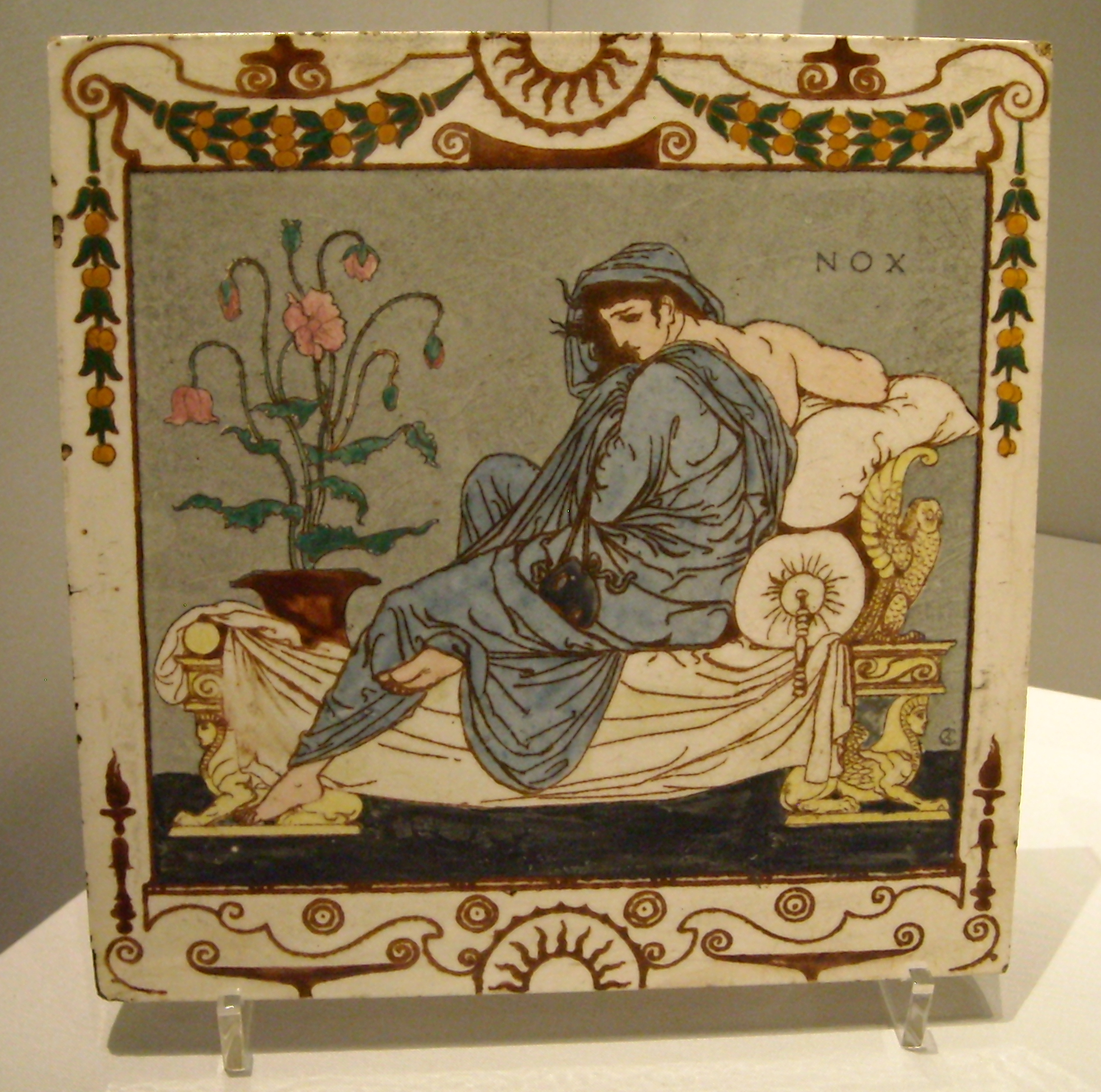
Maw & Co tile designed by Walter Crane, 1878

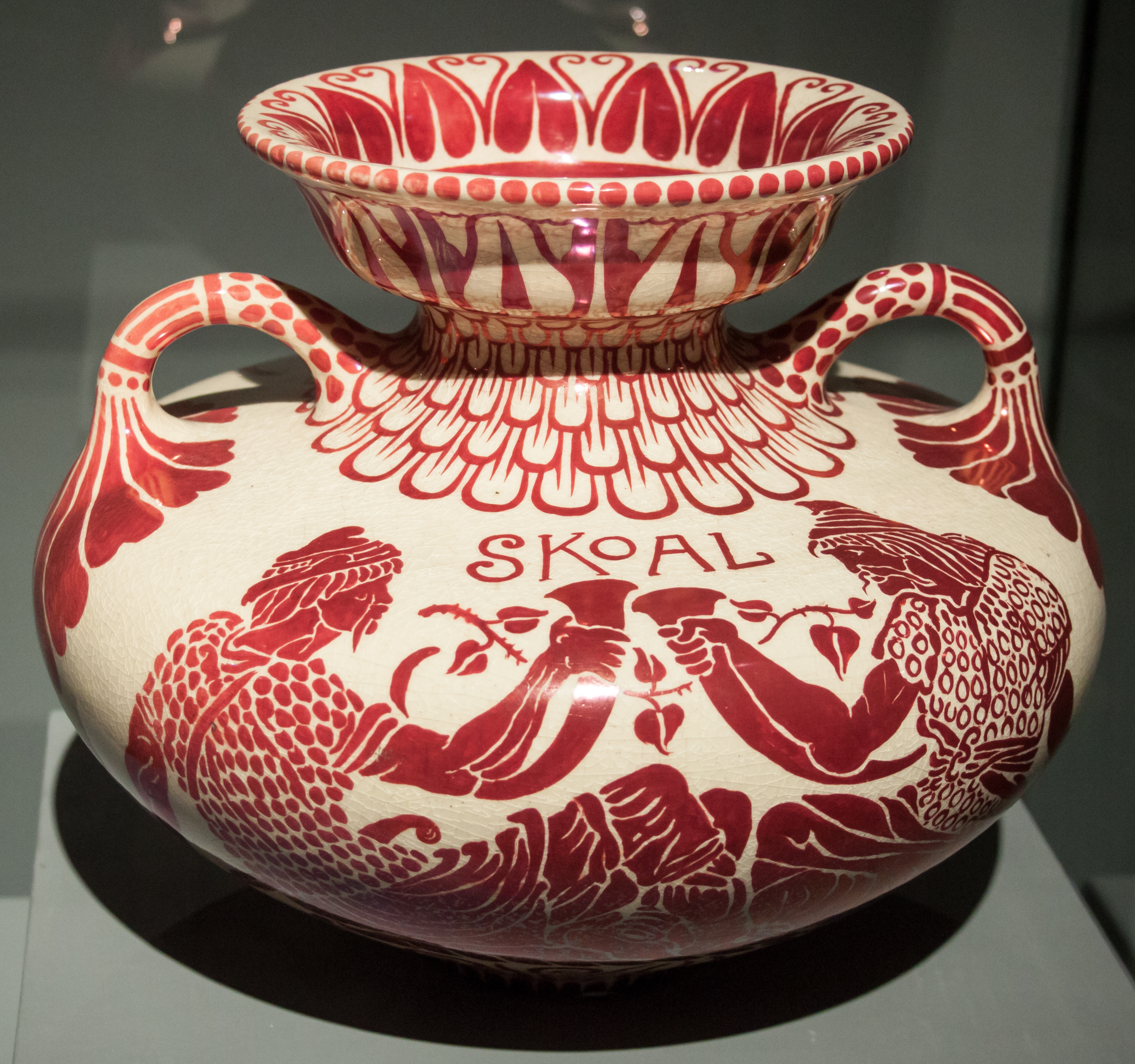
Maw & Co vase designed by Walter Crane, c. 1885

The earthenware encaustic and geometric floor tiles, for which Maw & Co are best known, have always been produced. In addition, mosaic tiles (from 1862), transfer printed tiles, hand painted picture tiles and relief tiles were also produced and included Art Nouveau and Art Deco geometric designs.

In the 1890s Maw & Co started making high quality art pottery (the name they used for it) and employed artists, such as Lewis Foreman Day and Walter Crane, to design both art pottery and tiles.

== Two-handled Commemorative Toast Mug ==
All the workers of Maw & Co contributed to a Benefit Club to enable them to be paid if they became ill. As a gesture of respect and affection for their employers the Club commissioned John Rose and Company (the trading name, at that time, of Coalport China) to make two toast mugs, one for each of the Maw brothers. The mugs were presented to the Maw brothers at the annual meeting of the Benefit Club in 1869. The inscription, on the inside of the lids of the mugs, shows the high regard that the workforce held for their employers and suggests that Maw & Co. were good employers and that their employees were well treated. The inscription reads:

Mr George and Mr Arthur Maw Gentleman – in anticipation of this day’s entertainment, in addition to the many substantial proofs of generosity and concern which you have shown to those in your employ, a deep sense of the obligation we felt ourselves under to you induced us to consider in what way we could best mark our appreciation of your past and present munificence and honourable treatment, but we were almost at a loss to know in what form or by what means we could render a token of our unfeigned gratitude and respect. However it was resolved to offer a cup to each the acceptation of which we now solicit at your hands, and beg to assure you that, though they are so insignificant in themselves, yet they are accompanied with warmer sentiments of esteem than we can find words to express.

One of the mugs, on loan from the Maw family, is on display at the Jackfield Tile Museum.

== Horticultural interests ==
George Maw is also notable for the major monograph he published on the genus Crocus in 1886.

== Bibliography ==
- Mathew, Brian (1986). "George Maw and his monograph". The Kew Magazine. 3 (4): 186–189. JSTOR 45066517.
- Maw, George (1886). A monograph of the genus Crocus. With an appendix on the etymology of the words crocus and saffron by C.C. Lacaita. London: Dulau and Co.
  - Nature (February 1887). "The Crocus". Nature (Review). 35 (902): 348–349. Bibcode:1887Natur..35..348.. doi:10.1038/035348a0.
- Rix, Alison (May 2008). "George Maw, Joseph Hooker and the genus Crocus". Curtis's Botanical Magazine. 25 (2): 176–187. doi:10.1111/j.1467-8748.2008.00616.x.
