= Maw language =

The Maw language may refer to:

- Mal Paharia language, from India
- Ndam language, also known as Maw of Kouam, from Chad
- Tai Mao language, also known as Tai Maw, from Burma
- Parauk Wa language, also known as, Mong Maw, Khwin Maw, from Burma
