= Sarah Mawe =

English mineralogist and dealer in minerals

- Born: 1767; Derbyshire, England
- Died: 1846 (aged 78–79)
- Citizenship: British
- Scientific career
- Fields: Mineralogy

Sarah Mawe (1767-1846) was an English mineralogist of the 19th century, appointed to serve Queen Victoria in that capacity from 1837 to 1840.

== Biography ==
Sarah Mawe was born Sarah Brown in Derby, England to the mineralogist Richard Brown. She married the mineralogist and dealer in minerals John Mawe in 1794 and he became her father's business partner, and took charge of the London mineral shop. "She became a highly competent mineral appraiser, purchaser, and identifier in her own right." The Mawes' shop on the Strand soon became extremely successful, and so they opened shops in Cheltenham and Matlock Bath. Mawe constructed her own collections of minerals, loaned as examples to James Sowerby for photographs to be used in Exotic Mineralogy (1811-1820) and British Mineralogy (1804-1817). The business in London was taken on by James Tennant who held Mawe's collection until it was sold in 1846.
