= Gallery Mau Mau =

Exhibition venue in Cape Town, South Africa

Coordinates: 33°55′31″S 18°24′57″E

Mau Mau logo created by Donovan Ward. Conrad Botes chose the colour scheme.

Gallery Mau Mau (1996–1998) was a short-lived counter-culture "art space" situated in Cape Town, South Africa. The experimental space provided low-cost access to the arts for artists of all races, broke boundaries and defined the period in which a visual arts culture saw enormous growth in the city. It was run by cultural activist David Robert Lewis, multimedia artist Adam Lieber, musician and disk jockey Nick Birkby and fine artist Chris Slack.

The gallery launched the careers of some of South Africa's best known young artists: Mustafa Maluka had his first solo show there, as did Donovon Ward and Julia Clark. Other exhibitors included Barend de Wet, Beezy Bailey, Norman Catherine, (see list of participants below).

== Participants ==
Artists included Beezy Bailey, Dana Barak, Natalie Berry, Robert Berold, Samten de Wet, Conrad Botes, Lien Botha, Jesse Breytenbach, Norman Catherine, Michelle Chipps, Gabrial Clark-Browne, Julia Clarke, Connor Cullinan, Barend De Wet, Michael Dewill, Garth Erasmus, Everon, Gus Ferguson, Falko, Eugene Fisher, Graeme Germond, Bruce Granville-Mathews, Le Due Hai, Allan Horwitz, Ashraf Jamal, Botsotso Jesters, Jacki Job, David Robert Lewis; Adam Lieber, Lynne Lomofsky, Mustafa Maluka, Kholelo Masala, Veronique Malherbe, Till Mayer, Petra Mason, Joshua Miles, Anthony Milne, Mother City Queer Project, Gregg Murray, Khulile Nxumalo, Mxolisi Nyezwa, Jeannie O’Carroll, Norman O'Flynn, Craig Parker, Natalie Payne, Peet Pienaar, Karen Press, Benning Puren, Andrew Putter, RealRozzano, Geli Schubert, Siphiwe Tirivanhu, Sky One, Chris Slack, Le Ngoc Thanh, Tom Schwarer, Anna Varney, Donovan Ward, and Philip Zhuwao.

== Press comments ==
- "If you manage to find the door with the peeling sign, you'll be able to enter the world of Mau Mau, an underground art movement run by five residential artistic people." Cosmopolitan
- "Browse, lurk or hang out. The creative experimental space hosts bizarre cine-art conventions and unusual exhibitions." Cosmopolitan
- "Providing sustenance for the culture-hungry masses, a group of aspirant art originals retain a meeting space for social outcasts that just happens to have art on the walls." SL Magazine
- "Gallery Mau Mau regularly processes short exhibitions with grand openings where all are welcome. It's a vibrant space where the flamboyant understanding of art as entertainment is instituted." SL Magazine
- "The Mau Mau Gallery happily places itself on the fringe of Cape Town's art establishment." Inside SA
- "It's a lively exhibition space that holds multimedia shows featuring anything from film clips to photographs and performance art. DJs spin discs on opening nights with occasional rantings from beat poets. It's also the only gallery that offers free cream soda at the bar. Inside SA
- "Expect heavy doses of irony and sparks of genius as lanky youths give the art Illuminati the finger." Inside SA
- "The Mau Mau Gallery is owned by anyone who is an artist. Located below the Lounge on Cape Town's Long Street, it is run by David Robert Lewis, who sees himself as a janitor rather than a curator. Its only limitation is space, otherwise anything that can be justifiably argued as art, gets a show. True to its name, Mau Mau is an act of rebellion, an uprising. In formal, mainstream galleries, artists have their work taken away from them (and the viewer) -- displays are clinical and prices exorbitant -- but Mau Mau showcases affordable, underground art at street level. Now, even established dealers can be seen hanging around here. They also want to see what's contemporary, cutting edge and desirable." Petra Mason
