= George Maw =

British botanist (1832–1912)

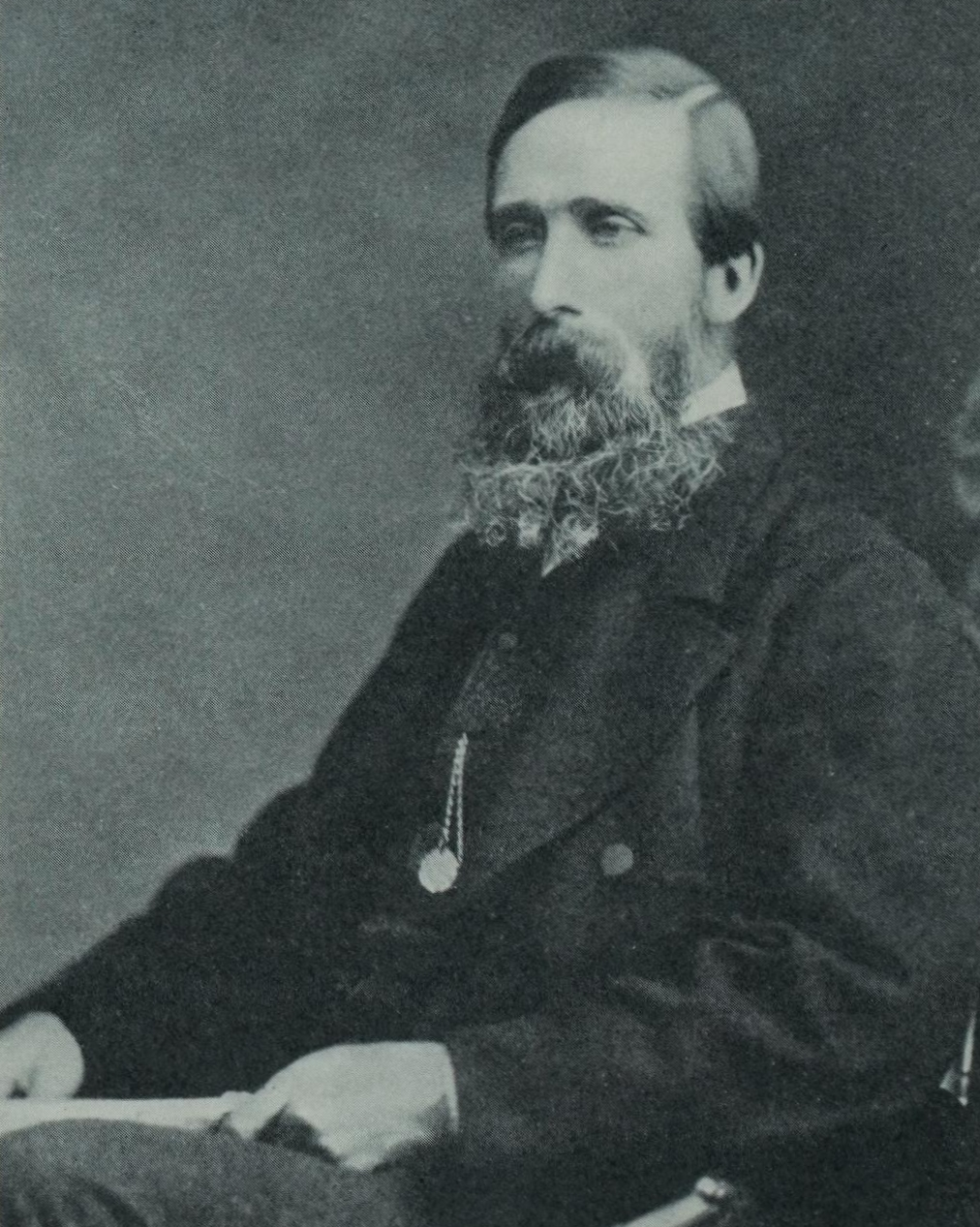

George Maw (10 December 1832 – 7 February 1912) was an English gardener, botanist, artist, and a founder of Maw and Company, an art tile factory, along with his brother. He grew and wrote about the Crocus genus, species of which he collected from around the world.

== Life and work ==
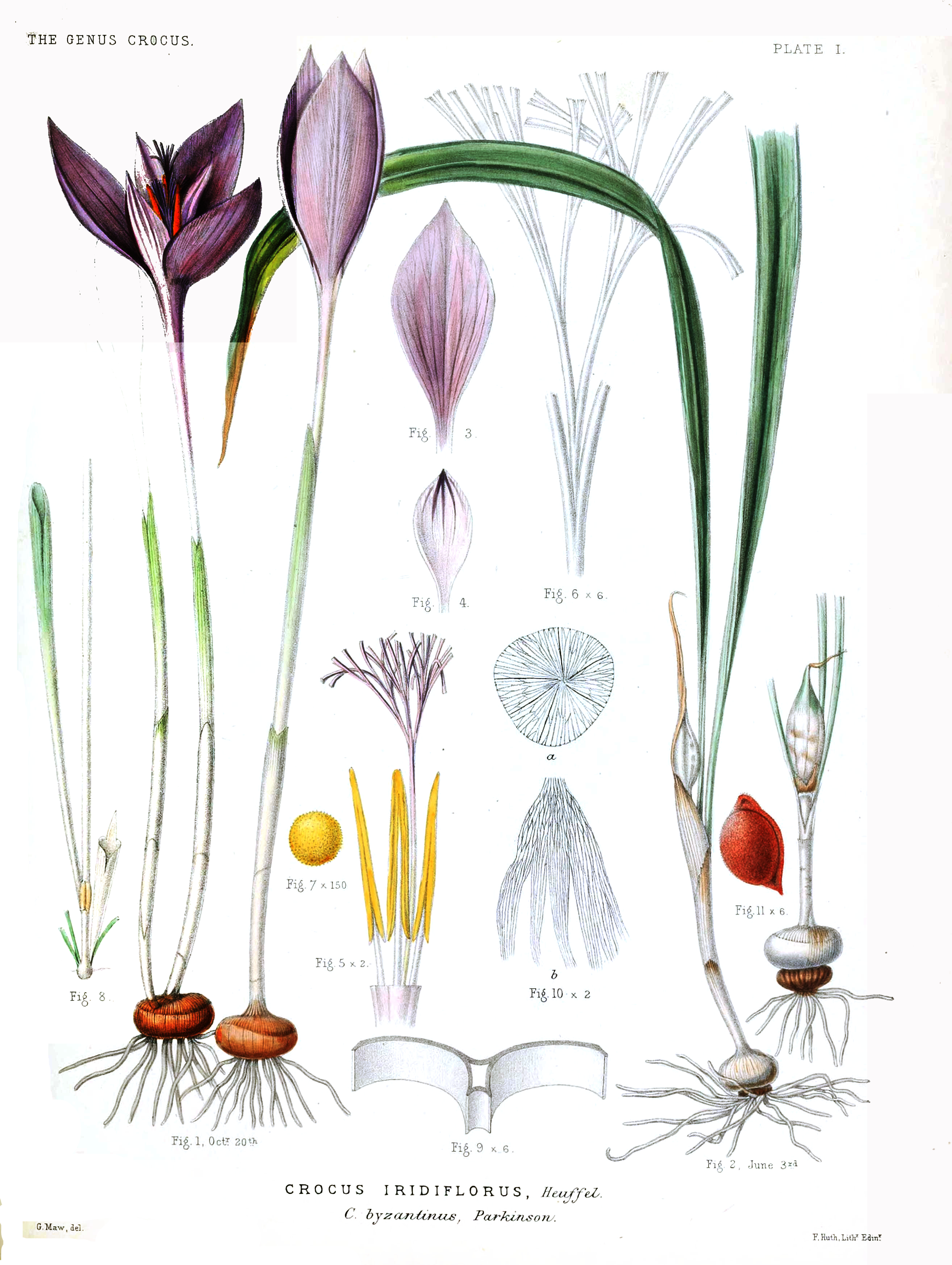
Illustration of Crocus iridiflorus by Maw

Maw was born in Aldermanbury, London, to John Hornby and Mary Ann Johnson. His grandfather Solomon Maw was a manufacturer of surgical instruments. He was taught at home and then went to the Royal Agricultural College, Cirencester, where he received a diploma in 1852. His father retired to West Hill House, Hastings, and also bought an old tile factory in Worcester in 1849 and this was developed by the sons George and Arthur to form Maw and Company. They produced medieval style floor tiles. The factory moved to Shropshire where better clay was available and he lived at Benthall Hall, Broseley, Shropshire from 1860. He married Frederica Mary Brown (d. 1894) in 1861. He was also interested in plants and grew a range of plants. He became a fellow of the Linnean Society in 1860. They became noted as an artistic tile factory and from the 1860s he produced terracotta labels for the Kew Gardens for which he received a patent in 1868. In 1871 he travelled with J.D. Hooker and John Ball to collect plants in Morocco and the Atlas Mountains. He moved from Broseley to Rangemore, Kenley in 1886 due to poor health. Between 1877 and 1881 he published several notes in the Gardeners' Chronicle with illustrations of plants made by himself. In 1886 he published a monograph of the genus Crocus.

Maw travelled to collect plants across Europe. He was a Fellow of the Geological Society (1864) and the Society of Antiquaries.
