= Gelila Zakarias =

Island near Lake Tana, Ethiopia

Gelila Zakarias is a small island in the northwestern part of Lake Tana in Ethiopia. Located southwest of the Gorgora peninsula, Daga has a latitude and longitude of 12°10′N 37°11′E. The island is a circular, forested cone with the monastery church of Iyasus at the peak. When R.E. Cheesman visited it in 1933, he found the monastery flourishing, and the abbot invited him to partake in their Lenten far.

According to the Futuh al-Habasha of Sihab ad-Din Ahmad bin 'Abd al-Qader, during the Ethiopian-Adal War, on 18 May 1545 Imam Ahmed ibn Ibrahim al-Ghazi led a group of followers to attack Gelila Zakarias. The rafts carrying the followers of the Imam were met by soldiers in tankwa, the name of the indigenous boats made of papyrus. However, the soldiers failed to stop the attackers rafts. Since all of the defenders were in tankwas, once the Imam and his followers outdistanced them, they landed unopposed on the island and burned down the church of Iyasus.
