= Mekdela Amba University =

University in Ethiopia

Coordinates: 10.986°N 39.263°E

- Motto: Striving for Change!
- Type: Public
- Established: 2015
- President: Dr. Kassa Shawel Reta
- Students: 5500 students (2024)
- Location: Gimba, South Wollo, Amhara, Ethiopia
- Campus: Two Campus
- Nickname: MAU
- Website: mkau.edu.et

Mekdela Amba University (Amharic: መቅደላ አምባ ዩኒቨርስቲ,MAU ) is a public Comprehensive university in South Wollo Zone, Amhara Region, Ethiopia. The main campus is at Gimba, 80km west of Dessie, and another campus is at Mekane Selam, 100km from the main campus. The main campus is 58km south from the historical place Mekdela Amba.

The university was established in 2015, one of 11 universities set up to expand higher education and distribute it across the country.

As of December 2024 the university website states that it has 409 teachers and a total of 2001 employees, and 5750 undergraduate and 54 postgraduate students.
