= Bure Wemberma =

Former district in Amhara Region, Ethiopia

Coordinates: 10°40′N 36°45′E

Bure Wemberma was one of the 105 woredas in the Amhara Region of Ethiopia. Bure Wembera was divided into Bure and Wemberma woredas.

== History ==
Its name was created from a combination of its largest town, Bure, and the historic district of Wemberma (also transliterated "Wombarma"), which lay north of the Abay River between its tributaries the Zingini and Fatam. Part of the Mirab Gojjam Zone, Bure Wemberma was bordered on the south by the Abay River which separated it from the Oromia Region, on the west by the Agew Awi Zone, on the north by Sekela, on the northeast by Jabi Tehnan, on the east by Dembecha, and on the southeast by the Misraq Gojjam Zone. Other towns in Bure Wemberma included Shendi. Bure Wembera was divided for Bure and Wemberma woredas.

Rivers in this woreda included the Kotlan.

== Demographics ==
Based on figures published by the Central Statistical Agency in 2005, this woreda has an estimated total population of 296,398, of whom 149,343 are men and 147,055 are women; 32,585 or 10.99% of its population are urban dwellers, which is greater than the Zone average of 7.6%. With an estimated area of 2,207.20 square kilometers, Bure Wemberma has an estimated population density of 134.3 people per square kilometer, which is less than the Zone average of 174.47.

The 1994 national census reported a total population for this woreda of 214,714, of whom 107,131 were men and 107,583 were women; 18,814 or 8.76% of its population were urban dwellers. The four largest ethnic groups reported in Bure Wemberma were the Amhara (96.31%), the Oromo (2.36%), the Gumuz (0.64%) and the Awi (0.61%) a subgroup of the Agaw; all other ethnic groups made up 0.08% of the population. Amharic was spoken as a first language by 96.26%, 2.38% speak Oromiffa, 0.64% Gumuz, and 0.62% speak Awngi; the remaining 0.1% spoke all other primary languages reported. The majority of the inhabitants practiced Ethiopian Orthodox Christianity, with 95.51% reporting that as their religion, while 4.68% were Muslim.

== See also ==
- Bure, Gojjam (woreda)
