= List of wars involving Ethiopia =

This is a list of wars involving the Federal Democratic Republic of Ethiopia (modern-day Ethiopia) and its predecessor states.

== Ethiopian Empire (1270–1975) ==
Conflict	Combatant 1	Combatant 2	Results
Conquests of Amda Seyon I (1316–1332)	Ethiopia	Sultanate of Ifat; Kingdom of Damot; Hadiya Sultanate; Sultanate of Dawaro; Enderta Province; Kingdom of Simien; & more	Victories: Incorporation of the southern kingdoms into the Ethiopian Empire; Conquest of Dawaro; Re-establishment of Imperial hegemony in Tigray; Establishment of Imperial hegemony in Ifat; Spread of Judaism in modern-day Mi'irabawi halted
Badley ad-Din II's Invasion of Ethiopia (1445)	Ethiopian Empire	Adal Sultanate	Victory: Death of the Adal Sultan
Abyssinian–Adal War (1529–1543)	Ethiopian Empire; Portuguese Empire (1541–43)	Adal Sultanate; Ottoman Empire (1542–43)	Stalemate: Status quo ante bellum
Ottoman–Ethiopian War (1557–1589)	Ethiopian Empire	Ottoman Empire: Egypt Eyalet; Yemen Eyalet; Medri Bahri; Adal Sultanate	Victory: Ethiopian victory in the highlands; Ottoman annexation of Massawa; Decline and dissolution of the Adal Sultanate; Establishment of Habesh Eyalet in Hergigo and Massawa; The establishment of Ottoman Zeila
Iyasu II's Invasion of Sennar (1738)	Ethiopia	Sennar; Supported by: Darfur	Defeat: Iyasu II's army defeated; Several of the Ethiopian Emperor's valuables lost
Zemene Mesafint (1769–1855)	Various factions	Various factions	Reunification of Ethiopia: Tewodros II becomes Emperor
Ottoman–Ethiopian border conflicts (1832–1848)	Ethiopian Empire	Ottoman Empire: Eyalet of Egypt	Victory: Ethiopia retains territorial integrity and independence; Ottoman-Egyptians expand south into the Great Lakes region; Leads to the Egyptian-Ethiopian war
British Expedition to Abyssinia (1867–1868)	Ethiopian Empire	United Kingdom: India; Ethiopian rebels	Defeat: Tewodros II commits suicide to avoid capture
Ethiopian–Egyptian War (1874–1876)	Ethiopia	Egyptian Empire	Victory: Egyptian Khedive defeated; Collapse of Egyptian Khedivate
Mahdist War (1881–1889)	United Kingdom • Egypt • India • Canada • Colony of New South Wales; Italy • (Kingdom of Italy) Colony of Eritrea; Ethiopia; Congo Free State	Mahdist State	Victory: End of Mahdist raids into Ethiopia at the Battle of Gallabat; Death of Emperor Yohannes IV; End of the Mahdist war in 1889
Italo-Ethiopian War of 1887–1889	Ethiopian Empire	Kingdom of Italy	Compromise: Treaty of Wuchale; establishment of Italian Eritrea
Menelik's Expansions (Late 19th century)	Ethiopian Empire; ∟ Shewa; Armed by: France; United Kingdom	Various polities (see List of polities involved)	Victories: Incorporation of the southern kingdoms into the Ethiopian Empire.; Incorporation of the Oromo borderlands such as the Kingdom of Jimma, Qabesh, and Arsi Oromo into the Ethiopian Empire; Incorporation of the Emirate of Harar and Ogaden region into the Ethiopian Empire; Beginning of the Dervish war in response to Ethiopian expansion into the Ogaden; Centralization of Ethiopia in Shewa; Founding of Addis Ababa in 1897.
First Italo-Ethiopian War (1896)	Ethiopian Empire	Kingdom of Italy	Victory: Ethiopia retains independence; Italians defeated
Dervish War (1900–1920)	British Empire; Italy; Ethiopian Empire (1900–1904); and (1914–1915)	Dervish movement Supported by: Ottoman Empire; Ethiopian Empire (1915–1916); German Empire	Ethiopian allied victory: Collapse of the Dervish State
Second Italo-Ethiopian War (1935–1937)	Ethiopia	Italy	Defeat: Italian control over most of the Ethiopian Empire's former territory; Establishment of Italian East Africa; Beginning of Arbegnoch anti-fascist resistance
East African Campaign (1940–1941)	British Empire: United Kingdom; India; South Africa; Kenya; Sudan; Nigeria; Gold Coast; Somaliland; Northern Rhodesia; Southern Rhodesia; Uganda; Nyasaland; Australia; New Zealand; (Ethiopian Empire) Ethiopian Arbegnoch; Belgium: Congo; Free France: Equatorial Africa	Italy: Italian East Africa	Ethiopian allied victory: Fall of Italian East Africa; Independence of Ethiopia
Woyane rebellion (1943)	Ethiopia; United Kingdom	Woyane rebels	Victory: Revolt crushed
Korean War (1950–1953)	South Korea; United Nations (Note: On 9 July 1951 troop constituents were: US: 70.4%; ROK: 23.3%; other UNC: 6.3%.); United States; Ethiopia; ... see other countries	North Korea; China; Soviet Union (air support only)	Stalemate: The Korean Armistice Agreement
Congo Crisis (1960–1964)	1960–1963: (Democratic Republic of the Congo) Republic of the Congo; Supported by: Soviet Union (1960); (United Nations) ONUC (Note: ONUC, the United Nations Operation in the Congo, included troops from Ghana, Tunisia, Morocco, Ethiopia, Ireland, Guinea, Sweden, Mali, Sudan, Liberia, Canada, India, Indonesia and the United Arab Republic among others.); Ethiopia; 1963–1964: Democratic Republic of the Congo; United States; Belgium; Supported by: (United Nations) ONUC (1964); Ethiopia	1960–1963: Katanga; South Kasai; Supported by: Belgium (Note: The secession of Katanga and South Kasai was also supported by South Africa, France, Portuguese Angola and the neighbouring Central African Federation. However, neither was ever officially recognised by any state.); 1960–1962: (Democratic Republic of the Congo) Free Republic of the Congo; Supported by: Soviet Union; 1963–1964: Kwilu and Simba rebels; Supported by: Soviet Union; China; Cuba	Victory: Debellation of Congolese separatist states
Bale Revolt (1963–1970)	Ethiopia	Oromo and Somali rebels; (Somali Democratic Republic) Somali Republic; → Somalia	Victory: Revolt crushed, peace agreement
1964 Ethiopian–Somali War (1964)	Ethiopia	(Somalia) Somali Republic United Arab Republic	Stalemate: Military offensive of Ethiopia repulsed, ceasefire agreement
OLA insurgency (1973–present)	Ethiopia; Former combatants: Ethiopian Empire (until 1975); Derg (1975–87); PDRE (1987–91); TGE (1991–95)	OLF (until 2018); OLA (initially part of OLF, independent from 2018); IFLO (1985–87); EUPF (1993–2012); Supported by: (Note: Alleged by the government of Ethiopia.); Eritrea (1998–2018); Egypt (alleged)	Ongoing: Start of peace talks between government of Ethiopia and the OLA on 25 April 2023; Conflict resumes after peace talks failed in May 2023.; The OLA and the government signed a peace deal on 1 December 2024 and its members started moving into designated camps

== Communist Ethiopia (1975–1991) ==
Conflict	Combatant 1	Combatant 2	Results
Eritrean War of Independence (1961–1991)	1961–1974; Ethiopian Empire Supported by: United States; Israel; 1974–1991; Derg (1974–1987); PDR Ethiopia (1987–1991) Supported by: Soviet Union (1974–1990); Cuba (1974–1990); South Yemen (1974–1990); Israel; North Korea	ELF (1961–1981) Supported by: Sudan; Libya; China (until 1972); Cuba (until 1975); Syria; Iraq; Saudi Arabia; Somalia; EPLF (since 1973) (Tigray Region) TPLF (since 1975) Supported by: Libya; Sudan; Somalia; Syria; Iraq; Kuwait; United Arab Emirates	EPLF victory: Eritrean insurgency begins in 1961; ELF defeated by EPLF and TPLF during the Eritrean Civil Wars; Fall of the Derg regime; Eritrea gains de facto independence from Ethiopia in 1991 under EPLF rule, and de jure independence after the referendum held in 1993 under UN auspices; Independence of Eritrea; Ethiopia becomes a landlocked country.
Ogaden War (1977–1978)	Ethiopia; Cuba; Soviet Union; South Yemen	Somalia; WSLF	Ethiopian victory: Somalia breaks all ties with the Soviet Bloc and the Second World (except China and Romania).; Beginning of the Somali Rebellion
1982 Ethiopian-Somali Border War (1982–1983)	Ethiopia; SSDF	Somalia	Stalemate: Ethiopian invasion repulsed; Stalemate at border towns of Galdogob and Balanbale; Upsurge in domestic support for Somali President Siad Barre; United States delivers emergency military aid to Somalia; Ethiopian army and SSDF temporarily occupy the border towns of Galdogob and Balanbale
Ethiopian Civil War (1974–1991)	Derg (1974–1987); PDR Ethiopia (1987–1991); Supported by: Soviet Union (1974–1990); Cuba (1974–1990); South Yemen (1974–1990); Somali anti-Barre groups: (Somalia) USC; SSDF; SPM; SNM; Somali Anti WSLF-groups: Afraad; SNM	EPRDF: (Tigray Region) TPLF; (Amhara Region) EPDM; OPDO; EPRP; MEISON (from 1977); EDU; OLF; WSLF; ALF; Eritrean separatists: ELF (until 1981); EPLF; Somali nationalists: WSLF; ONLF Supported by: United States; Somalia (1978–1991); China (from 1978); (Socialist Republic of Romania) Romania (1978–1989)	EPLF/TPLF rebel victory: Fall of the Ethiopian Empire and subsequent implementation of military rule; Creation, then collapse, of the People's Democratic Republic of Ethiopia by the Derg; Installation of the TPLF-led transitional government which would later become the EPRDF government in Ethiopia; Installation of the EPLF-established PFDJ government in Eritrea after independence from Ethiopia; Independence of Eritrea; Ethiopia becomes a landlocked country.

== Federal Democratic Republic of Ethiopia (from 1995) ==
Conflict	Combatant 1	Combatant 2	Results
Insurgency in Ogaden (1992–2018)	Ethiopia; Supported by: Somaliland	ONLF; Supported by: Eritrea; Egypt (alleged by Ethiopia) al-Itihaad al-Islamiya (1992–97)	Peace agreement reached: Status quo ante bellum
Eritrean–Ethiopian War (1998–2000)	Ethiopia	Eritrea	Ethiopian military victory Eritrean diplomatic victory: Algiers Agreement (2000); Most of the disputed territory awarded to Eritrea by the Permanent Court of Arbitration in 2002; Ethiopian occupation of disputed territories and the border town of Badme until the 2020 Tigray War; Refugee displacement and humanitarian crises of Eritreans and Ethiopians; Deployment of UN Peace-keeping troops along disputed border region; Conflict over the border continues until 2018; Final and binding border delimitation by the International Court of Arbitration
Ethiopian occupation of Somalia (2006–2009)	Invasion: Ethiopia; (Somalia) TFG; United States Supported by: Kenya; Insurgency: Ethiopia; (Somalia) TFG; Puntland; Galmudug; ASWJ United States; AMISOM: Burundi; Kenya; Malawi; Nigeria; Uganda	Invasion: Islamic Courts Union; Supported by: ONLF; Eritrea Insurgency: Al-Shabaab; (Somalia) ARS; Ras Kamboni Brigades; Jabhatul Islamiya; Muaskar Anole; ICU loyalists	Islamist insurgent victory, see Consequences: Disintegration of the Islamic Courts Union government and emergence of Islamist insurgency; Deployment of AMISOM (2007); Rise of al-Shabaab; Escalation of Insurgency in Ogaden; Proliferation of Somali piracy; Insurgency recaptures majority of south/central Somalia and Mogadishu; Withdrawal of ENDF from Mogadishu and majority of Somalia (2009); New phase of Somali Civil War with conflict between 'radical' and 'moderate' Islamists
South Sudanese Civil War (2013–2020)	(United Nations) UNMISS: (United Nations) Regional Protection Force; Rwanda; Ethiopia	South Sudan: SPLA; Air Force; Mathiang Anyoor; Maban Defence Force; Allied militias: SSLM; SRF: JEM (Note: The SPLM-IO accused JEM of supporting Kiir's government since 2013, though JEM has denied any involvement and claims to maintain neutrality in the South Sudanese Civil War. The Sudanese government, aid workers and other sources have however affirmed that JEM is taking part in conflict on the side of the South Sudanese government.); SPLM-N (alleged); SLA-AW; SLA-MM; EUPF (alleged); State allies: Uganda; Egypt (alleged) (South Sudan) SPLM-IO; Nuer White Army (South Sudan) SSDM: Cobra Faction (Note: The Cobra Faction openly opposed the government until 2014, and remained in relative opposition until 2015, when it divided into a pro-government and pro-SPLM-IO faction, the latter of which formed the Greater Pibor Forces. In early 2016, the Cobra Faction effectively disbanded, when the remaining group joined the government. In September 2016, however, the Cobra Faction was declared restored by some of its commanders and declared that it had resumed its struggle against the government.); Greater Pibor Forces (since 2015); (South Sudan) Agwelek forces; TFNF; SSFDP; South Sudan National Army; NAS; Arrow Boys (since Nov. 2015); Wau State insurgents SSOA (until September 2018); SSOMA/NSSSOG (until Jan. 2020); Supported by: Sudan (South Sudanese gov. claim)	Stalemate
Oromia–Somali clashes (2016–2018)	Ethiopia: (Oromia Region) Oromia	(Somali Region) Somali: (Somali Region) Liyu Police	Abdi Illey arrested
Benishangul-Gumuz conflict (2019–2022)	Ethiopia: ENDF; Benishangul-Gumuz Region; Amhara Region; Fano	(Benishangul-Gumuz Region) Gumuz People’s Democratic Movement; Benishangul People's Liberation Movement; Oromo Liberation Army; Tigray People's Liberation Front (alleged)	Peace agreement reached
Tigray War (2020–2022)	Ethiopia; Eritrea	Tigray; OLA (2021–22)	Pretoria Agreement: The government and the TPLF formally agreed to a cessation of hostilities and systematic, verifiable disarmament (2 November 2022); Second agreement for implementing the peace deal signed by both parties (12 November 2022); Federal authority in the Tigray Region is reestablished; Interim Regional Administration of Tigray formed on 23 March 2023; Continued Eritrean military presence in Tigray as of 2023; Status of Tigray Region's Western Zone still disputed
Al-Fashaga conflict (2020–2022)	(Amhara Region) Amhara militias Alleged: Ethiopia; Eritrea	Sudan	Sudanese victory: Disengagement and de-escalation; Sudan recaptures all of the border territory with Ethiopia.; Sudan and Ethiopia agree to settle all disputes peacefully.
War in Amhara (2023–present)	Ethiopia: ENDF; Amhara Region Government	Fano factions: Amhara People's Army; Wollo Fano; Gojjam Fano; Gondar Fano; Shewa Fano	Ongoing: Heavy clashes erupt between Fano and ENDF during August 2023; Drone attacks against civilian targets; Mass arrests and detention of Amhara civilians; State of emergency declared; Fano forces launch offensive in July 2024; ENDF launches major counter-offensive in October 2024
