= Drone strikes during the Fano insurgency =

During the Fano insurgency, the Ethiopian National Defense Force (ENDF) has heavily utilized drone strikes in combat operations against the Fano militia and the civilian population. The attacks have reportedly resulted in widespread destruction, civilian casualties, and a growing humanitarian crisis.

Since late 2024, drone operations have escalated drastically following the commencement of major ENDF counteroffensives. This escalation has notably impacted rural communities and urban fringes across the Gojjam, Shewa, and Wollo zones, repeatedly drawing international concern over collateral infrastructure damage and non-combatant fatalities.

Over 600 people have been killed in drone strikes since the insurgency began in 2023.

== List of drone strikes ==
Documented Drone Strikes in the Amhara Region
Date	Location	Target/Context	Reported Casualties	Ref.
13 August 2023	Finote Selam (West Gojjam Zone)	Town center / Public square	26–30 people killed; 55+ people injured	
9 November 2023	Waber (East Gojjam Zone)	Primary school and surrounding civilian area	13 people killed; Multiple infrastructure areas destroyed	
30 November 2023	Wegel Tena (South Wollo Zone)	Near healthcare facility infrastructure	5 people killed (including a prominent medical doctor)	
5 December 2023	Wegel Tena (South Wollo Zone)	Residential/Militia encounter corridor	10 people killed	
19 February 2024	Near Sasit (North Shewa Zone)	Passenger truck transit route	30+ people killed; 18 people injured	
11–14 October 2024	Gerchech, Mecha woreda (North Gojjam Zone)	Intermittent strikes during military counteroffensive	100+ people killed	
26 October 2024	Achefer (North Gojjam Zone)	Rural settlement corridors	50+ people killed (reports include pregnant women)	
5 November 2024	Durbete (West Gojjam Zone)	Town vicinity during intense infantry clashes	30+ people killed (reports note a mix of civilians and militants)	
17 April 2025	Gedeb (East Gojjam Zone)	Rural locality / Local congregation area	100+ people killed	
15 January 2026	Wag Hemra Zone	Friendly fire incident on pro-government base camp	40+ killed (pro-government troops)	
