= Fano insurgency =

Ongoing armed conflict in Amhara Region, Ethiopia

- Part of the Ethiopian civil conflict (2018–present)
- Map of Ethiopia showing areas of Fano militia presence (in yellow) and areas under the control of the Ethiopian government (in red)
| Date | 9 April 2023 – present (3 years, 7 months and 4 days) |
| Location | Amhara Region and the Western Zone (Spillover into Oromo Region) |
| Status | Ongoing; Heavy clashes erupt between Fano and ENDF during August 2023; Drone attacks against civilian targets; Mass arrests and detention of Amhara civilians; State of emergency declared; Fano forces launch offensive in July 2024; ENDF launches major counter-offensive in October 2024; Fano rebel factions unify in January 2026 |

Belligerents
| Fano; AFNM; Minor Fano factions; Support: TPLF (September 2026 – present) OLA (September 2026 – present) | Ethiopia |

Commanders and leaders
| Eskinder Nega; Zemene Kassie; Mihretu Wodajo; Meketaw Mamo; Baye Kengaw | (Ethiopia) Abiy Ahmed (Ethiopia) Birhanu Jula (Ethiopia) Abebaw Tadesse (Ethiopia) Abraham Belay (Ethiopia) Arega Kebede |

The Fano insurgency or Amhara war is an armed conflict and insurgency in the Amhara Region of Ethiopia that began in April 2023 between the Fano militia and the Ethiopian government. The conflict started after the government attempted to dissolve the Amhara Special Forces and other regional forces as part of a plan to reform and centralize the country's security apparatus, and integrate them into the federal armed forces. This move led to protests and armed resistance by local forces under Fano.

Tensions between Fano and the government had been growing for a year before the conflict. Although Fano fighters had allied with the government during the Tigray war, relations soured after the 2022 peace agreement, which Fano viewed as a betrayal. The government, in turn, saw Fano as a growing threat due to its unregulated nature. In early 2023, the government enacted the first stage of its plan to recentralize the Ethiopian security services and moved to dissolve the gendarmerie regional special forces in Amhara. In April 2023, at the onset of the insurgency, some regional forces members defected to the Fano militants who began fighting against the Ethiopian National Defense Force (ENDF). Since then, the war has been largely fought in the region's rural highlands, though Fano has managed to penetrate and raid urban areas.

By mid-2023, much of the Amhara region had become a war zone as Fano launched offensives in key cities, briefly taking control of some before being pushed back by the ENDF in August of that year. A six-month state of emergency was declared in August 2023 following a request from the Amhara regional government. Fighting escalated in 2024, with renewed insurgent offensives in the Gondar and Gojjam zones and increased military operations by the ENDF. The conflict has resulted in the heavy use of airstrikes, clashes over key towns, and reports of rising civilian casualties. During July 2024 Fano launched a broad offensive across the region and in October 2024, the Ethiopian military launched a large scale counterinsurgency operation. Much of the Amhara countryside has come under Fano control, with reports of extortion, theft, and kidnapping becoming rampant. West Gojjam Zone in particular has seen severe levels of armed conflict since October.

The ENDF has been accused of serious human rights abuses and the indiscriminate use of drone strikes. Human rights organizations have accused the military of extrajudicial killings and attacks on medical facilities. Amnesty International reports the government has been arbitrarily detaining thousands of civilians in internment camps. Communications have been restricted and access denied to journalists attempting to report from the region. The war has reportedly caused over 15,000 casualties, including combatants and civilians.

The Ethiopian government has accused Eritrea of arming Fano rebels in the insurgency, though the Eritrean government has denied these claims and dismissed them as "false flags" designed to justify a would-be Ethiopian military action against Eritrea.

Despite some local support, Fano's lack of centralized leadership and factionalism has raised questions about the insurgency's sustainability. While the government has been unable to decisively defeat Fano, the insurgent group has struggled to leverage its gains politically due to its decentralized nature. International observers warn that the conflict risks destabilizing the entire country as neither side appears capable of a military victory.

== Background ==
The Amhara people have historically dominated Ethiopia's economic, cultural, and political spheres. After the Derg regime's fall in 1991, the Tigray People's Liberation Front (TPLF) took control of the newly formed government, holding power for decades. This Tigrayan dominance in post-1991 governance mirrored the significant political influence that the Amhara had wielded through most of the 20th century since Emperor Menelik II. Over time, however, the TPLF's hold on power weakened as political groups from the Oromo people and the Amhara increasingly resisted Tigrayan hegemony. The Amhara youth movement known as Fano emerged during the widespread protests of 2016, where both Oromo and Amhara demonstrators protested against the TPLF-dominated federal government. The term dates back to the 1930s, originating during the Second Italo-Ethiopian War to describe volunteer Amhara fighters. While Fano-led protests in the Amhara Region were smaller in scale compared to those the Oromia region, they were markedly more violent. Despite a shared resentment of the TPLF, little was done to unite the Amhara and Oromo ethnic groups for the long-term once the TPLF was replaced in 2018 by Prime Minister Abiy Ahmed's Oromo-dominated administration.

Since the start of the 21st century, Ethiopia's federal model has faced challenges from the rapid growth of regional security forces. The origin and formation of Ethiopia's regional forces started in the early 2000s, when the insurgency in the Ogaden led to the creation of a paramilitary and gendarmerie force called the Liyu Police (special police) which was tasked with counterinsurgency against the Ogaden National Liberation Front (ONLF) rebel fighters and became a 40,000 strong armed force by the end of the decade. Although established by the federal government, the force answered primarily to the regional governor. Following this development, the regional forces grew exponentially, which led to the formal establishment of the Ethiopian Regional Special Forces. The gendarmerie regional forces began operating in all regions of the country and were restructured to operate similar to that of the US National Guard with each region of Ethiopia having and using their own regional forces. While Ethiopia's regions had the constitutional right to regional forces, they were trained more for combat than policing, posing a growing threat to the federal order and increasing tensions between regions. In the following years, the Amhara regional forces were used by the government to suppress regional disorders. During the late 2010s, the threat posed by these forces began manifesting.

In 2018, the Ethiopian military intervened in the Somali Region in response to the threat posed by the regional special forces unit there, deposing the regional president Abdi Iley. During the 2019 Amhara Region coup attempt, the head of the Amhara regional special forces, Brigadier General Asaminew Tsige, ordered successful assassinations on the president of the Amhara region and the chief of staff of the Ethiopian National Defense Force (ENDF). The ENDF intervened in response, killing Tsige and some of his followers, which temporarily stabilized the situation.

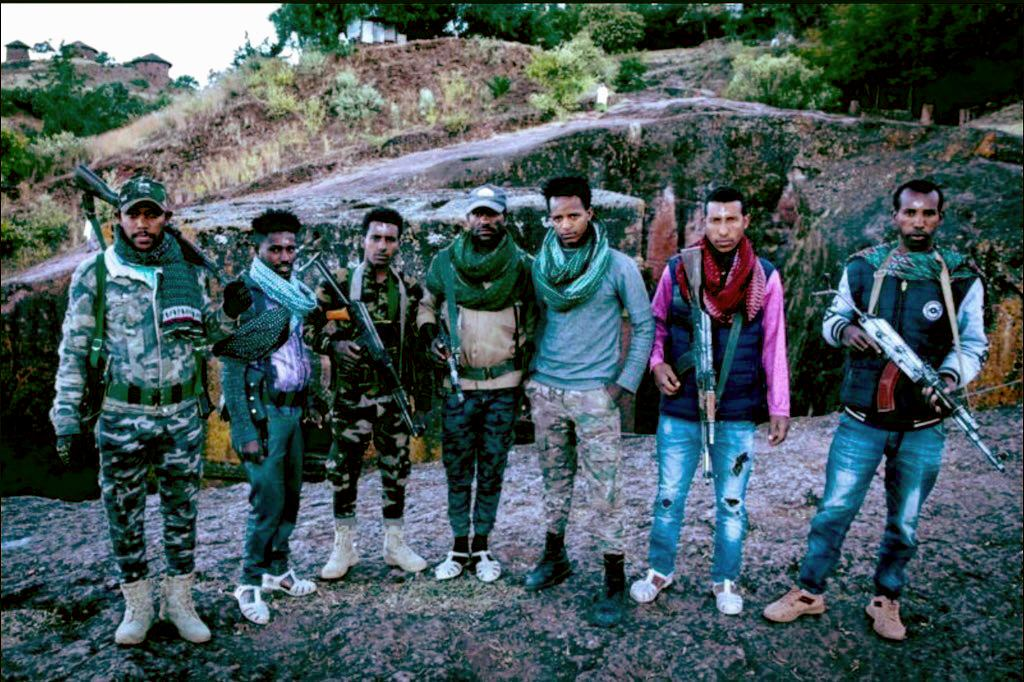
Fano fighters near the Saint George Church in Lalibela shortly after recapturing it from the TDF during the Tigray War, December 2021.

In 2020, one of the bloodiest conflicts of the century, the Tigray war, erupted between the Ethiopian government and the TPLF. As hostilities unfolded in Tigray, Prime Minister Abiy Ahmed enlisted tens of thousands of fighters from the neighboring Amhara region to join the fight against the TPLF. During the war, Amhara militants under the banner of Fano seized contested areas of western and southern Tigray Region, carrying out ethnic cleansing. Fano had publicly claimed Tigray controlled northern districts of Welkait and Raya, as well as the southern district of Dera in Oromia region be placed under the control of the Amhara Region. Being forged in Amhara nationalism and the prophetic tradition of the Ethiopian Orthodox Church, Fano groups often wear symbolic crosses associated with the envisioned revival of a new Ethiopian kingdom. Orthodox clergy have frequently supported Fano, with monasteries serving as meeting locations, and during the Tigray War, Amhara Orthodox priests attended battlefields to provide prayers and blessings. The extreme violence during the ethnic cleansings carried out by Fano forced hundreds of thousands of Tigrayans to flee. The regional forces from Amhara acquired significant amounts of weaponry during the war along with training from Eritrean military advisors and the conflict allowed Fano to expand.

In November 2022, the Pretoria Agreement was signed, formally ending the Tigray War. The agreement stipulated that the status of Tigray's occupied areas would be resolved "in accordance with the constitution," though in practice, the issue remained unaddressed, with a delayed response from the government. Amhara forces were not signatory to the agreement. In the wake of Pretoria, the Ethiopian government had come to view the partially demobilized and disarmed Tigray Defense Forces (TDF) as a potential bulwark against Amhara militants. Fano felt betrayed by the peace agreement with the TPLF, as the organization views the Tigrayans as the 'historical enemy' of the Amhara people. The agreement also led the OLA insurgency to intensify amidst security and provisional reform in Tigray. The OLA had participated in massacres of ethnic Amhara's in the Oromia region. Fighting had occurred between Oromo and Amhara militants during the Tigray War. In May 2022, the Ethiopia government arrested thousands of people in the Amhara region in an attempt to weaken Fano.

In early 2023, the government began to enact the first stage of its plan to recentralize the Ethiopian security services. During early 2023, Amhara forces withdrew from Tigray region as stipulated per the Pretoria agreement. In April 2023 the government attempted to dissolve the Amhara Special Forces and other regional forces to "promote national unity." This move led to protests and armed resistance by local forces under Fano. The regional special force was perceived by the Amhara people as a buffer against ethnic cleansing and territorial disputes. The Ethiopian government saw armed Amhara groups such as Fano and the special forces as a growing threat due to their unregulated nature.

== Forces involved ==
Fano presently consists of several insurgent factions that operate independently, without a unified command. These factions are organized locally, each with its own leader in different parts of the Amhara Region. It is active in Shewa, Wollo, Gondar, and Gojjam, where different groups have formed at varying times, often with differing characteristics. Members of the organization claim in all there are 15,000 to 20,000 fighters. Fano also lacks a unified platform as many of the factions have objectives that differ greatly in some instances. The six insurgent factions and their respective leaders currently operating under the Fano umbrella are:

- Amhara People's Army led by Eskinder Nega
- Shewa faction in North Shewa led by Meketaw Mamo
- Wollo faction in Wollo led by Mihret Wodajo
- Gojjam faction in Gojjam led by Zemene Kase
- North Gondar faction in North Gondar led by Habte Wolde
- South Gondar faction in South Gondar led by Baye Kengaw

Efforts to unify Fano factions under a single leadership have faced significant challenges. Eskinder Nega of the Amhara People's Army was appointed as the organization's leader at one point, but several factions rejected his leadership. As of October 2024, no unified command structure has been established. Fano commanders have stated that negotiations with the government will not be considered until the insurgency achieves internal unity. A previous attempt to organize peace talks fell apart due to internal divisions, which hindered the group's ability to present a clear plan or position itself as a viable alternative.

== History ==
=== Civil disobedience: April–August 2023 ===
In early April 2023, federal forces stormed into the Amhara region to disarm regional and paramilitary forces. The local civilians moved to remote areas, as the resistant fighters joined a protest with police forces. On 9 April, large-scale protests flared up in Gondar, Kobo, Seqota, Weldiya and other cities, including road obstruction and setting tires ablaze to block the incoming Ethiopian Army. The Ethiopian government started to repress opposition media in the region, as well as the killing of aid workers by unknown assailants which led the World Food Programme and other NGOs to stop aid operation in that area. Two Catholic Relief Services (CRS) were killed near town Kobo region. According to the Ethiopian Red Cross Society, one of their ambulance was shot by unknown militants in Central Gondar Zone, injuring a midwife and driver.

On 4 May, the Ethiopian Human Rights Commission (EHRC) reported a series of militarised situations in the area of North Gondar, North Wollo and North Shewa zones in the town of Shewa Robit, Armania, Antsokiyana Gemza and Majete. The Amhara regional government accused the Fano militia's eastern faction for the assassination of the head of Amhara Prosperity Party Girma Yeshitila on 27 April. Subsequently, the Ethiopian security forces arrested 47 suspects allegedly connected to the assassination plot, accusing them for plotting to overthrow the authorities. The public broadcaster EBC stated that the suspect caught in variety weapons and utilities including weapons, bombs and satellite communications equipment. Amnesty International verified the extrajudicial killings of ENDF troops between 10 and 11 October 2023 against health workers, including threatening them with gunpoint.

=== Escalation of insurgency: August 2023 – December 2023 ===
On 1 August 2023, heavy fighting erupted between the Fano militia and the ENDF in Debre Tabor and Kobo while ENDF troops attempted to push back Fano from these cities. Deputy Prime Minister Demeke Mekonnen stated in a rare occasion that security problems in different areas of Amhara region were becoming "concerning." On 2 August, Fano captured the Lalibela Airport. Through the public broadcaster EBC, ENDF spokesperson Colonel Getnet Adane threatened to bring the military campaign against Fano if they continued "disturbing the country's peace". The Spanish embassy in Ethiopia urged tourists not to leave the city. Heavy clashes were reported around Gondar that same day. On 3 August, Amhara regional governor Yilkal Kefale requested help from the ENDF to quell the clashes.

On 4 August, the Ethiopian government declared a state of emergency after the Amhara regional government requested federal troops for help. Prime Minister Abiy Ahmed said that the declaration was necessary as it had become "difficult to control this outrageous activity based on the regular legal system." A curfew and warrantless arrests were introduced and public gatherings were banned. Later it was reported that Gondar, Lalibela and Dessie had fallen under Fano control. On 5 August, Fano militiamen claimed to have captured Merawi and were aiming to encircle Bahir Dar. On the same day, the Ethiopian security forces announced that they arrested ten people connected to "the security crisis in Amhara".

The Director-General of the Information Network Security Agency Temesgen Tiruneh stated on 6 August that irregular Amhara forces captured towns, released prisoners and seized government institutions. On 7 August, the Ethiopian government acknowledged they lost control in some towns and districts in the region. They were able to push back Fano and control Gondar and Lalibela in the following day. A Fano militiaman told to the Reuters that the ENDF was accompanied by anti-riot police and pro-government militiamen. The military advanced their control into six towns and flight resumed.

According to a statement by the Ethiopian Human Rights Commission (EHRC), in Debre Birhan city, due to heavy fighting in four densely populated kebeles on 6 and 7 August 2023, civilians including in a hospital, church, and school as well as residents in their neighborhoods and workers in their workplaces were apparently killed due to fragments from heavy artillery or in crossfire. IDPs in Debre Birhan were also at risk of being caught in the crossfire, particularly those in what is commonly known as the "China IDPs" site near Kebele 8, which hosts close to 13,000 people. The EHRC stated that it received credible reports that in many areas of Bahir Dar civilians were killed on the streets or outside their houses while some youths were specifically targeted for searches and subjected to beatings and killings. There are credible reports of many civilian casualties and damages to property in various parts of Gondar and extra-judicial killings in Shewa Robit by the security forces, the details of which were yet to be fully investigated and verified as of 14 August 2023.

On 13 August, the ENDF carried out a drone strike on the town of Finote Selam, killing 26 people according to the hospital source. The EHRC (EHRC) later reported of shelling in Finote Selam that resulted civilian casualties.

On 3 September 2023, the ENDF captured the town of Majete from Fano. The EEPA reported that the ENDF conducted door-to-door searches in the town and had committed extrajudicial killings against the residents, including the execution of young men. At least 70 civilians were killed in these executions. On 24 September, Fano re-entered the city of Gondar and clashed with the ENDF. The ENDF sustained multiple casualties during this engagement.

On 8 November, Fano briefly recaptured Lalibela by pushing back the ENDF base to rural areas, before the ENDF were able to seize the town in the following day. The government spokesperson, Legesse Tulu, criticize some reports that detail the violence during fighting. The UN estimated on 17 November that nearly 50 civilians have died in the clashes over the past months. Seif Magango, a spokesperson for the U.N. human rights office, said that "It is imperative that all parties refrain from unlawful attacks and take all necessary measures to protect civilians."

=== 2024 ===
During 2024, Fano insurgents stepped up attacks on the ENDF, while briefly holding several towns and cities. On 3 January 2024, Fano clashed with ENDF in the city of Debre Birhan. On 8 January, Fano re-entered Gondar city for the third time and clashed with the ENDF. ENDF artillery use in the city reportedly resulted in up to 14 civilian deaths.

On 24 February, the Ethiopian federal government had decided to close the road leading from Shewa Robit to Dessie due to heavy fighting in certain areas between the two cities. On 29 February, Fano begun offensive operations against the ENDF in Bahir Dar. Multiple flights from Addis Ababa to Bahir Dar have been reportedly canceled.

On 3 March, Fano clashed with the ENDF in the city of Shewa Robit. On 20 March, Oromo militants attacked Ataye and clashed against local Amhara militias. On 22 March, Ethiopian Media Services reported that Brigadier General Gaddissa Diro was killed by Fano forces in Dega Damot woreda of Gojjam. It is reported General Diro was killed in Fano's offensive operation named Operation Wubante after Wubante Abate, a Fano commander in South Gondar who was killed in action earlier that week. Fano claims to have captured hundreds of ENDF prisoners of war in Gojjam over the three days since the operation had begun. On 12 April, a shootout took place between federal police forces and Fano members near the Millennium Hall in Bole district, Addis Ababa resulted in deaths of two Fano militants and a civilian driver who was "coerced by the militants to pick them up" according to the Addis Ababa Federal Police Commission statement.

==== July 2024–October 2024: Fano offensive ====
In July 2024, Fano began a general offensive in the region, where in October 2024, the offensive allowed the insurgency to control several rural areas while degrading federal forces ability to use the regional transport network. On 15 July, internet service was resumed in the Amhara region after being shut down the previous year. On 22 July, Fano's Chief commander in North Shewa, Colonel Asegid Mekonnen, surrendered to the Ethiopian security forces. Transportation between Addis Ababa and Bahir Dar, the capital of Amhara region, was halted in August 2024 due to the fighting. Furthermore, travel restrictions also imposed in Wollo, Shewa and Gondar.

Fano seized the strategic Ethiopia–Sudan border town of Metemma on the first day of September, aiming to cut off supplies of fuel and food coming across the border. After being disarmed, Sudanese authorities allowed ENDF troops to retreat into Sudan. Gondar, a major city in the region, has seen a surge in violent crimes, including robbery, kidnapping, and murder. On 17 September 2024, Fano insurgents started an offensive into Gondar claiming to have captured the city, killing at least 9 people and injuring at least 30. Dozens were confirmed killed during the fighting for the city at the end of September, and urban warfare in Gondar continued into October. Since 28 September, hundreds of people in Amhara region have been subject to arbitrary arrest and detention at the hands of the Ethiopian army and police.

Between July and September 2024, insurgent attacks on the ENDF tripled compared to the same period in 2023.

==== October–December 2024: ENDF counter-offensive ====
The end of the rainy season has resulted in an escalation in the war, as drier conditions have allowed troops to maneuver, and clearer skies has enabled greater use of drone strikes. The Ethiopian National Defence Force and the Amhara regional government announced that security operations would be intensified in a joint statement issued on 1 October 2024. In what was described as the "final operation" armed forces spokesperson Colonel Getnet Adane declared that, "The only language they [armed rebel groups] understand is force. From now on, we will talk to them in that language." The Ethiopian Air Force has been extensively employed throughout October as the government intensified its air campaign against Fano. Helicopter gunships and drones have reportedly been used throughout the region during the new ENDF operation. West Gojjam Zone of Amhara region has seen severe levels of armed conflict since the start of the operation. Tens of thousands of ENDF troops have poured into the Amhara region.

At the start of October, Fano groups jointly issued a travel ban on all major roads. On 3 October 2024, heavy fighting occurred in multiple localities of the South Gondar Zone. Residents reported airstrikes being employed in several districts of the zone, reportedly in both rural mountainous and urban civilian areas. For several weeks, the region has seen a significant influx of ENDF reinforcements. Central Gondar Zone and West Gojjam Zone also witnessed heavy fighting, particularly in the town of Finote Selam, where ENDF artillery bombardment occurred until Fano withdrew on 5 October. However, hostilities resumed the following day as Fano launched a three-pronged offensive to retake the town. Fighting also occurred in the Agew Awi Zone. The ENDF continued to reinforce its presence across the region as "law enforcement operations" persist amidst escalating civilian casualties. Over October, the intensity of the fighting escalated in multiple areas of the region. The town of Weldiya saw a brief but intense battle on 13 October after Fano forces launched an offensive on ENDF positions, and other towns in the area have reported coming under artillery fire. From 19 to 20 October, the town of Debark in the North Gondar Zone was the site of intense fighting. The ENDF announced after the fighting the "neutralization of terrorist group leaders and members, along with the seizure of weapons." Over 50 people were reported killed in a drone strike carried out in urban areas of North Gojjam zone on 26 October. Residents in the region reported being falsely accused of being Fano fighters and targeted by the ENDF. The war has started causing disruptions to medical supply chains and ambulance services across the region and fighting has carried on into the last week of October across several zones in the region.

So far, the ENDF has in large part forced Fano to retreat into the mountains to wage its insurgency. On 1 November, BBC Amharic reported that following insurgent attacks in East Welega Zone of Oromia, regional authorities ordered legally armed Amhara residents to surrender their private weapons. This move has heightened tensions, with Amhara residents in Oromia's Gida Kiremu district reporting increased threats and attacks. On 5 November, US Secretary of State Antony Blinken expressed concern over the rising violence in the Amhara region in a phone call with Prime Minister Abiy Ahmed. That same day, drone strikes and intense fighting erupted in the West Gojjam Zone when the ENDF attacked a Fano training camp, resulting in casualties among militants and civilians. Clashes have reportedly escalated in the zone since then. On 9 November, the town of Shewa Robit was heavily shelled by artillery during a battle, and residents have reported living in a constant state of fear amid the ongoing war. An Ethiopian Air Force helicopter reportedly crashed at Bahir Dar Airport on 16 November. Gojjam Fano claimed they had downed the aircraft, while the ENDF denied any helicopter had crashed.

The Ethiopian government has been unable to defeat Fano military so far, although Fano has been unable to capitalize on this politically due to its highly decentralized nature. Fano claims to control more than 80% of the Amhara region, with the ENDF restricted to main towns and highways. More than 300 civilians died in drone strikes during 2024. The government has denied journalists access to the region and blocked mobile communication. The United Nations is considering suspending relief operations, including food aid deliveries, following attacks on humanitarian workers in the region.

=== 2025 ===
At the start of the year there had been a significant decrease in fighting. On 1 January 2025, Fano claimed to have killed Lieutenant Colonel Teka Mekebo Mohammed, the commander of the Ethiopian Army's 48th Division, and a deputy lieutenant of a regiment within the division, Teresa Gezu Bikila.

During March 2025 Fano launched a new campaign as part of the Amhara offensive. On 12 March, Wollo Fano reportedly launched a major offensive in the North Wollo Amhara region, and intensified the offensive on 16 March, making claims they encircled Woldia city.

On 22 March, ENDF forces claimed to have killed more than 300 Fano militants, during 2 days of clashes from 20 to 24 March. ENDF claimed 317 Fano fighters were killed and 125 injured, however Amhara Fano in Wollo claimed the army had "not killed even 30 of their fighters."

On 17 April 2025, more than 100 people were killed in an Ethiopian military drone strike in East Gojjam zone. The drones struck villagers at a primary school; dozens of bodies were buried in mass graves the same day. Local officials deny civilian deaths, claiming the strike hit Fano militants.

By May 2025, the armed conflict between the Fano militia and Ethiopian federal and regional forces in Amhara has entered its 20th month. Reports from human rights organizations describe the region as operating under a de facto state of emergency, despite the official expiry of the federal mandate in 2023. Opposition MP Abebaw Desalew has accused the government of war crimes and abuses, such as mass detentions without trial, enforced disappearances, and indiscriminate military actions causing civilian casualties.

On 9 May, 2025, 4 Fano factions -Gojjam Fano, Wollo Fano, (Gondar) Amhara Fano Unity, and Shewa Fano- announced that they were unifying to establish the Amhara Fano National Force (AFNF) under a 13 member Central Command. According to the AFNF, the purpose of this unfication was to establish a cohesive body to protect the Amhara people. The Amhara Fano People's Organisation (AFPO), the other major Fano faction, declined to join.

In late September 2025, Fano groups reportedly launched "Operation Adem Ali", aiming to capture the city of Woldiya and ENDF positions in North and South Wollo. By early October, Fano claimed to have encircled Woldiya and captured several important towns, such as Mekane Selam and Gashena, while inflicting mass casualties on Ethiopian forces —although many of these claims cannot be verified. During the offensive, the Ethiopian government accused Eritrea and the TPLF of supporting Fano, accusing the latter of participating directly in the attacks on Woldiya. The operation reportedly ended on 10 October, with the AFNF-Menelik Command claiming a "resounding triumph" for Fano forces, and unverifiably claimed to have inflicted mass casualties against the Ethiopian government. The offensive was reportedly the first time AFNF and AFPO forces conducted joint operations.

On 8 October, the International Committee of the Red Cross (ICRC) visited soldiers held captive by Amhara Fano forces to evaluate their conditions of detention and treatment, and to restore contact with their families. The ICRC reported that it evacuated 16 critically injured captives requiring immediate medical attention. The captives were transferred to the ICRC by Amhara Fano across the front line, transported to Woldiya, and subsequently handed over to Ethiopian government forces.

On 5 December, the Ethiopian government and Masresha Setie, a leader within the AFPO claiming to represent the organisation, signed a peace agreement brokered by the African Union and Intergovernmental Authority on Development. The AFPO subsequently denounced the agreement, stating that Setie had been suspended before his surrender to government forces.

=== 2026 ===
On 22 January, the 2 largest Fano factions —Amhara Fano National Force (AFNF) and Amhara Fano Peace Organization (AFPO)— unified into the Amhara Fano National Movement (AFNM), the first Fano joint command. At the beginning of February, the AFNM launched an opportunistic offensive throughout central Amhara State, following several ENDF units withdrawing to Tigray due to tensions in the region. The AFNM claimed to have captured over a dozen towns in the offensive, including Ebenat, Alem Ber, Simada, and Tis Abay. On 4 February, AFNM forces entered the city of Debre Tabor, occupying it for several days before withdrawing due to government drone strikes.

In an interview with Le Temps on 16 August, AFNM Chairman Zemene Kassie claimed that the Shewa, Wollo, Gondar, and Wollega Fano had been brought under the same centralised command (whereas previously most Fano groups acted autonomously under the AFNM). He also claimed that, after months of negotiations, the AFNM had reached understandings with seven other anti-government groups —representing the Tigray, Gumuz, Berta, Somali, and Oromo peoples— to collaborate against Abiy Ahmed's government. While he did not name specific groups, it was implied that the TPLF, ONLF, and OLA were included in these talks.

== Human rights violations ==
The war has allegedly resulted in over 15,000 casualties, both combatants and civilians. In July 2024, the UN noted that more than 2,000 civilians had been killed in 2024 alone, as a result of fighting. The Ethiopian Human Rights Commission said that many human rights violations have occurred throughout Amhara Region. The violence has destabilized the region’s medical system and made travel to facilities too dangerous for many residents. Human Rights Watch reported that Ethiopian army troops have beaten, arbitrarily arrested, and intimidated medical workers for treating patients suspected of being Fano. Hospitals have also been raided and ambulances attacked. More than 5,000 women have sought medical treatment for sexual abuse since the start of the war, though this is believed to be a fraction of the real toll by Ethiopian civil society groups.

=== Sexual violence as a systematic weapon ===
Multiple reports dating back to the start of the Tigray war in November 2020 and continuing to this day, show that sexual violence was used as a terrorizing weapon against women, during the Fano insurgency. During the Fano uprising, in Ethiopia’s Amhara region, there have been many reports of sexual violence linked to the fighting. Human rights groups and doctors say thousands of women and girls have come for help after being raped or sexually abused, and they believe many more survivors never come forward because of shame, fear, or lack of services. These attacks happen together with other serious abuses like killings, arrests without reason, and attacks on clinics and hospitals. In this way, sexual violence is used as a weapon of war to scare people, harm their bodies, and break apart their communities.

The EHRC said that the Ethiopian Air Force's airstrikes and drone strikes on the cities of Debre Birhan, Finote Selam, and Bure has caused civilian casualties as well as damage to residential and public areas. Civilians in Bahir Dar were reportedly dragged out of their homes and "killed on the streets or outside their houses while some youths were specifically targeted for searches and subjected to beatings and killings." People of Amhara origin in the Ethiopian capital of Addis Ababa were reportedly subjected to widespread arrests by security forces. The EHRC also said it had received "credible reports" that extrajudicial killings by security forces had taken place in Shewa Robit and that civilian casualties and property damage had occurred in Gondar. On 30 January 2024, the ENDF reportedly carried out a massacre in Merawi that resulted in at least 89 civilian deaths. On 31 March 2025, ENDF soldiers reportedly killed at least 40 civilians, including women and children, in Birakat, a town in the Mecha woreda of West Gojjam Zone and surrounding villages, during house-to-house searches following clashes with local forces. Human rights monitors and independent reports described the killings as a reprisal attack carried out after the ENDF retook the area from Fano militia groups. The Birakat massacre has drawn comparisons to earlier incidents, such as the Merawi massacre in January 2024, and has been cited by observers as part of a broader pattern of retaliatory violence by government forces in the region.

Drone strikes in late 2023 mostly killed civilians, according to media reports. BBC News reported 30 to 40 people killed in a strike in Sayint district on 10 December. Al Jazeera English obtained footage of a 30 November drone strike that killed five civilians, including hospital staff, near Delanta Primary Hospital in Wegel Tena. The footage showed an ambulance ablaze with its roof caved in, consistent with a direct aerial hit. On 19 February, near Sela Dingay, Mojana Wedera district an ENDF drone struck a truck full of civilians returning from a baptism resulting in at least 30 civilian deaths.

During December 2024, government sources claimed that Fano fighters threw grenades into anti-war rallies being held in Amhara region. Refugees displaced in the Amhara region due to the ongoing Sudanese civil war have increasingly become targets of abuse from various armed actors, including Fano and the ENDF.

== Reactions ==
In early stages of the war, the United States was "deeply concerned" about the violence, while Spain and the United Kingdom warned their citizens against traveling to parts of Amhara. WHO Director General Tedros Adhanom stated on 7 August that "humanitarian access is difficult due to blockage of roads; communication is difficult due to internet suspension, conflicts have an immediate impact on people's health and can have grave, long-lasting consequences on health systems. We call for uninterrupted access and protection of health care in Amhara, so [that] WHO and partners can continue our work. Above all, we call for peace."

== See also ==
- Tigray War
- OLA insurgency
- Persecution of Amhara people
- 2023 in Ethiopia
- List of wars: 2003–present
