= Ayalew Asres Wendim =

Ethiopian politician (1923-2006)

Ayalew Asres
- አያሌው አስረስ
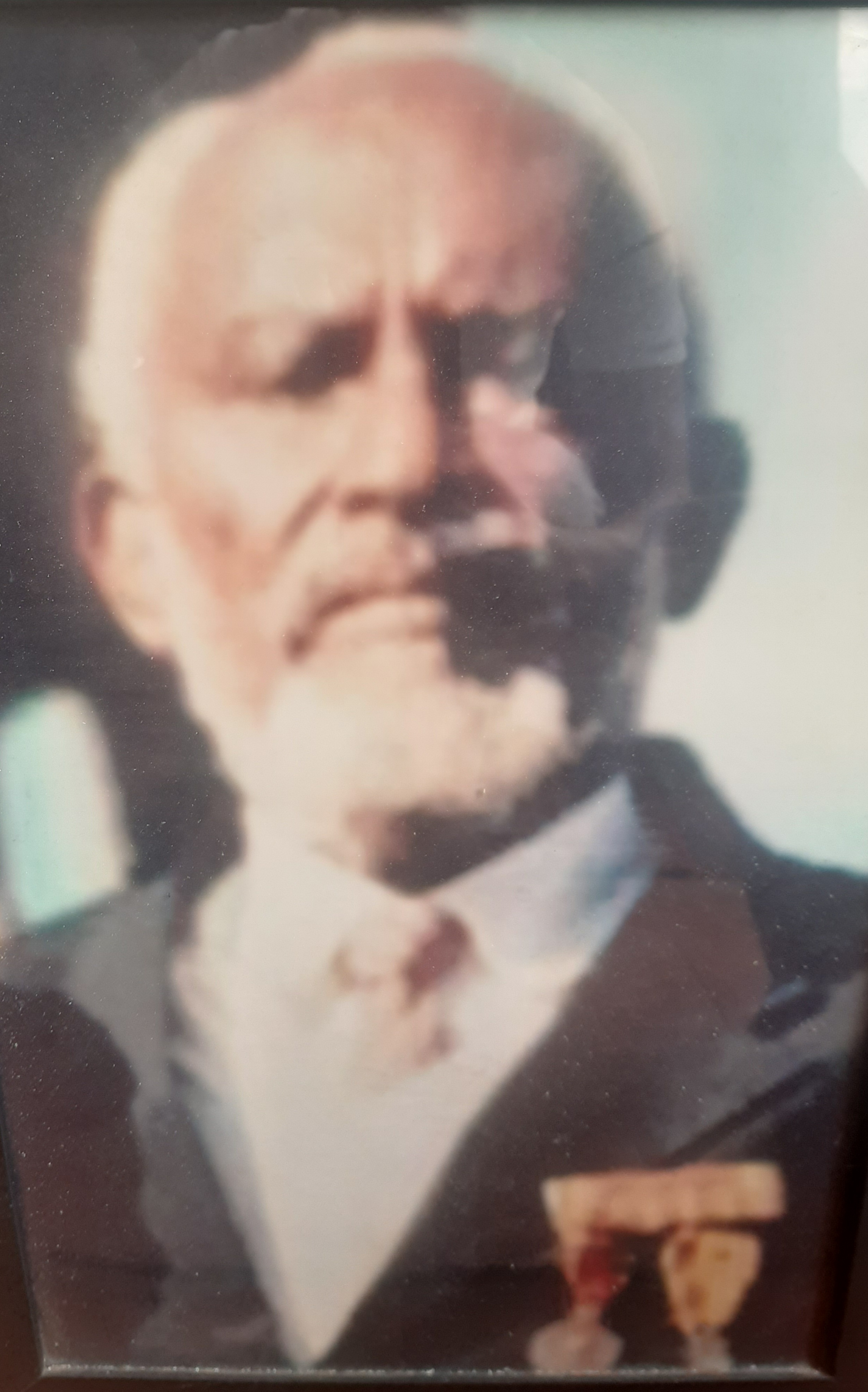

Arbegna
- In office 1928–1933

Personal details
- Born: 6 March 1923 Bure, Gojjam Province, Ethiopian Empire
- Died: 28 June 2006 (aged 83) Addis Ababa, Ethiopia

Military service
- Allegiance: Ethiopian Empire
- Years of service: 1928–1933
- Unit: Arbegnoch
- Battles/wars: Second Italo-Ethiopian War

Ayalew Asres Wendem (Amharic: አያሌው አስረስ ወንድም; 6 March 1923 – 28 June 2006) was an Ethiopian patriot, government official, and community leader who played a significant role in the resistance against the Italian occupation of Ethiopia and later in the development of various towns in the Gojjam region.

== Early life and patriotic resistance ==
Ayalew Asres Wendem was born on 6 March 1923 (27 Yekatit 1915 in the Ethiopian calendar) in Gojjam Region, Kola Dega Damot province, Bure Shikudad district, Askuna Giorgis kebele. His father, Ato Asres Wendem, was killed in the war against the Italian invaders in April 1936, which deeply influenced young Ayalew's commitment to Ethiopian independence.

At the age of 13, Ayalew became involved in the patriotic resistance movement known as the Arbegnoch (Patriots). He participated in numerous battles against the Italian forces, including engagements around Dangila town, Tilili Fetam River crossing, and Fereda Fikre Yohannes. Ayalew's bravery was noted in several instances, particularly during a battle at Mistikan Mountain where he was wounded while attempting to capture an enemy rifle.

For his patriotic struggle, Ayalew was awarded the Patriot Medal with Three Palm Leaves and the Victory Star by Emperor Haile Selassie.

== Government service ==
After the liberation of Ethiopia, Ayalew joined the Kebur Zabagna (Imperial Bodyguard) and served in Emperor Haile Selassie's palace for five years. He then returned to his birthplace and began a career in local government administration: Registry office writer for Bure town municipality (1946–1953), Founder and main secretary of Finote Selam town municipality (1953–1969), Mayor and judge of Bure town (1969–1977).

During his tenure, Ayalew made significant contributions to the development of Finote Selam and Bure towns, including organizing town layouts, establishing health centers and schools, improving irrigation systems, and creating marketplaces.

== Political aspirations and challenges ==
Ayalew ran for election to the Legal Advisory Council in 1976 and 1980 but was unsuccessful due to the biased electoral system of the time. Despite his long service and patriotic credentials, Ayalew faced several challenges, including limited recognition of his full patriotic service and a lack of service medals for his 36 years in government.

== Work with the Ethiopian Patriotic Association ==
After retiring from government service in 1977, Ayalew became actively involved with the Ancient Ethiopia Patriots Association:

- Manager of the Bahir Dar Development Work (1981–1982) 2. Member of the regional patriots' work leadership committee (1983–1991) 3. Member of the executive board (1996–2006)

In this capacity, he contributed to various initiatives, including restoring the Patriots Memorial Day, reclaiming the patriots' building in Addis Ababa, and participating in the return of the Obelisk of Axum from Italy.

== Spiritual life and community service ==
Ayalew was also active in religious and community affairs. He renovated and built several churches, including St. George Church in Askuna and St. George Church in Finote Selam. He facilitated cooperation between the Ancient Ethiopia Patriot Heroes and the Ethiopian Orthodox Tewahedo Church.

== Personal life ==
Ayalew Asres Wendem married Mamite Fantahun in 1950 and had six children with her. He fathered a total of 22 children: 14 sons and 8 daughters, with different women.

== Death and legacy ==
Ayalew Asres Wendem died on 28 June 2006 at the age of 83. His funeral was held at the Holy Trinity Cathedral, Addis Ababa, attended by friends, relatives, and high government officials. He was buried in the section reserved for Ethiopian patriot heroes.

Ayalew's life story reflects the complex history of Ethiopia during the 20th century, from resistance against foreign occupation to the challenges of nation-building and modernization. His contributions to local governance and development in the Gojjam region, as well as his lifelong commitment to honoring Ethiopia's patriotic legacy, make him a notable figure in modern Ethiopian history.

== Legacy and historical significance ==
Ayalew Asres Wendem's life and work embody the complex transitions Ethiopia underwent during the 20th century. His experiences provide valuable insights into several key aspects of Ethiopian history:

- Patriotic Resistance: As a young participant in the Arbegnoch movement, Ayalew's account offers a ground-level perspective on the Ethiopian resistance against Italian occupation.
- Local Governance and Development: Ayalew's career in local administration, particularly in Finote Selam and Bure, illustrates the challenges and opportunities in modernizing Ethiopian towns in the post-war period.
- Transition Periods: Having served during the imperial era, witnessed the Derg regime, and participated in public life into the early years of the Federal Democratic Republic of Ethiopia, Ayalew's experiences span critical transition periods in modern Ethiopian history.

== Notable achievements ==
- Urban Development: Ayalew's work in Finote Selam is particularly noteworthy. He oversaw the transformation of the town from a "forest-like state to an urban appearance," establishing a master plan that guided its development.
- During the Chinese government's development initiative in Bure town, a significant achievement was the resolution of the town's chronic water shortage. In addition to implementing a new water supply system, the Chinese team secured approval for expanded electric lighting infrastructure. While excavating wells for the town's drinking water supply, an unexpected discovery occurred: a natural mineral water source. This newfound resource was bottled and preserved, and has since been commercialized, contributing to the local economy.
- Crisis Management: His handling of various crises, such as the salt shortage in Bure district in 1983 and the refugee situation involving displaced Muslims, demonstrated his problem-solving skills and commitment to public welfare.
- Cultural Preservation: Ayalew's efforts to renovate churches and his involvement in the return of the Axum obelisk reflect his commitment to preserving Ethiopian cultural heritage.
- Advocacy for Patriots: His work with the Ancient Ethiopia Patriots Association, particularly in reclaiming the patriots' building in Addis Ababa and establishing aid programs for struggling patriots, shows his lifelong commitment to honoring and supporting his fellow resistance fighters.

== Historical context ==
Ayalew's life spans several crucial periods in Ethiopian history:

- Italian Occupation (1936–1941): His early involvement in the resistance movement provides a personal account of this pivotal period.
- Post-War Imperial Era: His career in local administration coincides with Emperor Haile Selassie's efforts to modernize Ethiopia.
- The Derg Regime (1974–1991): Ayalew's experiences during this period offer insights into the challenges faced by local administrators during the revolutionary era.
- Early Federal Period: His continued involvement in public life into the late 1990s touches on the early years of Ethiopia's current political system.

== Contributions to historical record ==
Ayalew's self-written autobiography, completed in 1998 E.C. (2006 Gregorian), serves as a valuable primary source for historians studying 20th-century Ethiopia. His detailed accounts of battles, local governance, and social changes provide a unique perspective on Ethiopian history.
