= Finote Selam drone strike =

2023 drone strike in Amhara Region, Ethiopia

- Part of War in Amhara
- Date: 13 August 2023
- Time: 1:00 PM (local time)
- Location: Finote Selam, West Gojjam Zone, Amhara Region, Ethiopia; 10.679446°N 37.259758°E
- Perpetrator: Ethiopian National Defense Force
- Deaths: 30
- Injuries: +55

On 13 August 2023, the Ethiopian National Defense Force launched a drone strike on the town of Finote Selam, in the West Gojjam Zone of Amhara Region in Ethiopia which killed 30 people while injuring more than 55 people who underwent emergency treatment. The strike was occurred after the ENDF recaptured several towns in the Amhara Region during its clashes with Fano militia in early August.

The Ethiopian Human Rights Commission (EHRC) told they received "credible reports of strikes and shelling, including from Debre Birhan, Finote Selam, and Bure, resulting in many civilian casualties and damage to residential areas and public spaces". According to the Ethiopian Media Service, the causality has been arisen to 70 retrieved from some sources.

== Event ==
On 13 August 2023, a drone strike carried out by the ENDF hit the center of the town of Finote Selam, in the West Gojjam Zone of the Amhara Region. Health workers said 26 people were killed by the strike. A doctor at Finote Selam Hospital said that many injured people were arriving at midday saying "there are many people who died at the site of the accident, but we do not have the exact numbers of that. But the ones who arrived here and passed away are around 26 people as of now." The health workers stated that medical equipment like oxygen tanks couldn't arrive at hospital due to roadblocks as the doctors struggled to treat victims. The hospital official told to Agence France-Presse that the injured civilians arrived "wearing either casual civilian clothing or Sunday traditional clothes".

The attack was the deadliest since the start of the conflict in Amhara Region between the Fano militia and the Ethiopian military. As of 15 August, the death toll rose to 30 with more than 55 injured people receiving emergency treatment. The Ethiopian Media Service stated that the causality number has reached 70 according to some sources.

== Response ==
The Ethiopian Human Rights Commission (EHRC) called on "conflicting parties to immediately end" for human rights abuses in the region". The commission told they received "credible reports of strikes and shelling, including from Debre Birhan, Finote Selam, and Bure, resulting in many civilian casualties and damage to residential areas and public spaces".
