= Amhara offensive =

Engagement in Ethiopia (2024–present)

- Part of Fano insurgency
Date	July 2024 – 17 April 2025
Location	Amhara Region, Ethiopia
Result	Fano strategic victory: Fano captures Metemma and parts of Gondar city as well as other strategic areas; Ethiopian government forces launch counter-offensive on October 2024

Belligerents
Fano; Supported by: Egypt (alleged)	Ethiopia Oromo Liberation Army

Units involved
Amhara People's Army; Fano in Wollo Province; Fano in Gojjam; Fano of Gondar; Fano in Gondar; Shewa Governorate	ENDF; Ethiopian Army; Ethiopian Air Force; Pro-government Oromo militia; Oromo Liberation Army

The 2024 Amhara offensive, was a military offensive undertaken by Fano, an insurgent group in the Amhara region of Ethiopia, from July 2024 to April 2025. The offensive resulted in the capture of several key cities and strategic areas, including the city of Debark and the Ethiopian-Sudanese border town of Metemma. The offensive was part of the ongoing Fano insurgency, a conflict that began in April 2023 between the Fano militia and the Ethiopian government.

== Timeline ==
On July 2024, Fano began a broad offensive in the Amhara region which enabled it to seize control of rural territories.

Fano units in Gondar started attacking the B30 Highway in September after a lull in August and launched an offensive to gain control over the C34 road, which links Amhara to neighboring Sudan. Fano carried out another eight attacks along the B30, this time claiming to briefly seize four villages, including two villages that were previously reportedly under Fano control.

On 1 September 2024, Fano seized the strategic Ethiopia-Sudan border town of Metemma, cutting off crucial supply lines for fuel and food from Sudan. After intense fighting, ENDF troops were forced to retreat into Sudan and were disarmed by Sudanese authorities.

On 17 September, Fano launched a large-scale offensive against Gondar, one of the largest cities in the Amhara region. The attack followed a rise in violent crimes, including robbery and kidnapping, which had been plaguing the city. Footage claimed to have shown the ENDF using tanks to shoot at densely populated neighbourhoods in Gondar. After heavy fighting, Fano claimed to have taken control of much of Gondar. The clashes resulted in the deaths of at least nine people and injuries to more than 30 others. Dozens of other people were confirmed killed during the fighting in the city at the end of September, and urban warfare in Gondar continued into October.

Fano's forces also captured key portions of the B30 Highway, which connects Gondar to other strategic areas.

In the days following the capture of Gondar, Fano expanded its operations to nearby towns, including Azezo and Debark. By 21 September, Fano forces claimed to have captured Debark after fierce fighting with government-aligned forces.

On 21 September, Fano militias captured the Rema Shewa road, located approximately 200 kilometres (120 mi) from Addis Ababa. Militants also expanded attacks to the neighboring B31 road, the other major road linking Addis Ababa and Bahir Dar, carrying out 12 attacks along the B31.

On 23 September, Fano militias claimed to have started an offensive onto North Shewa Zone.

On 1 October 2024, the Ethiopian National Defence Force and Amhara regional government announced in a joint statement an intensification of security operations. On 3 October, Fano commenced a travel ban on all major roads in the Amhara region. In a joint statement, the Fano groups from Gondar, Gojjam, Shewa, and Wollo urged the public to follow the vehicle movement ban, and has warned that those who violate the directive will face consequences. As of 3 October 2024, heavy fighting is ongoing between Fano and government forces in multiple localities of the South Gondar Zone. Residents have reported airstrikes being employed in several districts of the zone, reportedly in both rural mountainous and urban civilian areas. Central Gondar Zone and West Gojjam Zone also witnessed heavy fighting, particularly in the town of Finote Selam, where ENDF artillery bombardment occurred until Fano withdrew on 5 October. However, hostilities resumed the following day as Fano launched a three-pronged offensive to retake the town. Fighting also occurred in the Agew Awi Zone. The ENDF continued to reinforce its presence across the region as "law enforcement operations" persist amidst escalating civilian casualties. Over October, the intensity of the fighting escalated in multiple areas of the region. The town of Weldiya saw a brief but intense battle on 13 October after Fano forces launched an offensive on ENDF positions, and other towns in the area have reported coming under artillery fire. From 19 to 20 October, the town of Debark in the North Gondar Zone was the site of intense fighting. The ENDF announced after the fighting the "neutralization of terrorist group leaders and members, along with the seizure of weapons." Over 50 people were reported killed in a drone strike carried out in urban areas of North Gojjam zone on 26 October. Residents in the region reported being falsely accused of being Fano fighters and targeted by the ENDF.

For several weeks the region has seen a significant influx of ENDF reinforcements. The offensive has also seen the intensification of the air campaign against Fano insurgents by the Ethiopian Air Force. Air and drone strikes have been conducted on the Gondar and Gojjam zones of the Amhara region since the start of October, with helicopter gunships also being present in the operation.

The Ethiopian government has been unable to defeat Fano military so far, although Fano has been unable to capitalize on this politically due to its highly decentralized nature. Fano claims to control more than 80% of the Amhara region, with the ENDF restricted to main towns and highways.

At the start of the year there had been a significant decrease in fighting.

On 1 January 2025, Fano claimed to have killed Lieutenant Colonel Teka Mekebo Mohammed, the commander of the Ethiopian Army's 48th Division, and a deputy lieutenant of a regiment within the division, Teresa Gezu Bikila.

On 12 March, Wollo Fano reportedly launched a major offensive in the North Wollo Amhara region, and intensified the offensive on 16 March, making claims they encircled Woldia city.

On 22 March, ENDF forces claimed to have killed more than 300 Fano militants, during 2 days of clashes from 20 to 24 March. ENDF claimed 317 Fano fighters were killed and 125 injured, however Amhara Fano in Wollo claimed the army had "not killed even 30 of their fighters."

On 17 April 2025 more than 100 people were killed in an Ethiopian military drone strike in East Gojjam zone. The drones struck villagers at a primary school; dozens of bodies were buried in mass graves the same day. Local officials deny civilian deaths, claiming the strike hit Fano militants.

== See also ==
- Amhara Region coup attempt
