= Jabi Tehnan =

District in Amhara Region, Ethiopia

Coordinates: 10°50′N 37°10′E

- Woreda
- Flag
- Interactive map of Jabi Tehnan
- Zone: Mirab Gojjam
- Region: Amhara

Area
  - Total: 1,200.50 km^{2} (463.52 sq mi)

Population (2012 est.)
  - Total: 195,034
  - Density: 162.461/km^{2} (420.771/sq mi)

Jabi Tehnan (Amharic: ጃቢ ጠህናን) is one of the woredas in the Amhara Region of Ethiopia. Part of the Mirab Gojjam Zone, Jabi Tehnan is bordered on the southeast by Dembecha, on the west by Bure, on the northwest by Sekela, on the north by Kuarit, and on the east by Dega Damot. The town and separate woreda of Finote Selam is surrounded by Jabi Tehnan. Towns in Jabi Tehnan include Jiga, Maksegnit and Mankusa.

== Demographics ==
Based on the 2007 national census conducted by the Central Statistical Agency of Ethiopia (CSA), this woreda has a total population of 179,342, of whom 89,523 are men and 89,819 women; 12,609 or 7.03% are urban inhabitants. The majority of the inhabitants practiced Ethiopian Orthodox Christianity, with 97.96% reporting that as their religion, while 2.02% were Muslim.

The 1994 national census reported a total population for this woreda of 194,942, of whom 97,601 were men and 97,341 were women; 24,572 or 12.6% of its population were urban dwellers. The largest ethnic group reported in Jabi Tehnan was the Amhara (99.61%). Amharic was spoken as a first language by 99.7%. The majority of the inhabitants practiced Ethiopian Orthodox Christianity, with 97.1% reporting that as their religion, while 2.83% were Muslim.
