= Merawi massacre =

2024 massacre in Ethiopia

- Part of the Fano insurgency
- Location: 11°24′31″N 37°9′39″E; Merawi, West Gojjam, Amhara Region, Ethiopia
- Date: 29–30 January 2024
- Attack type: Shootings, robbery, extrajudicial killings
- Deaths: 50–100
- Perpetrator: Ethiopian National Defense Force
- Motive: Revenge for an attack by Fano

The Merawi massacre was the extrajudicial killing and massacre of 50 to 100 residents in the town of Merawi in the Amhara Region, Ethiopia by the Ethiopian National Defense Force (ENDF), between 29 and 30 January 2024. The massacre occurred after an attack on an Ethiopian military garrison by the Fano militia. Four survivors attributed the motivation for the massacre as revenge for the Fano attack. An investigation was launched by the Ethiopian Human Rights Commission (EHRC).

== Prelude ==
On 29 January 2024, Fano militias attacked an Ethiopian military encampment in Merawi. Fighting in the town between Fano and the ENDF lasted for six hours, in which Fano withdrew from the town, leaving it in full control of the ENDF.

According to four survivors interviewed by The Globe and Mail, the ENDF was "determined to take revenge" for Fano's attack.

== Massacre ==
On the afternoon of 29 January 2024, when Merawi was back under ENDF control, the ENDF carried out door-to-door searches, interrogated residents and accused them of sheltering Fano militants, and executed 100 men, women and children, of ages from 14 to 96. A witness interviewed by BBC News saw 13 people executed on Merawi's main street. The sound of gunfire was "constant" for much of the day.

The heaviest killings took place in 02 Kebele. Residents were robbed by the Ethiopian military officers prior to being executed. A 30-second video clip that was distributed on online social media was geolocated to "a business district in Merawi along the A3 highway, [bisecting] the town". The film was consistent with the witnesses' statements.

A resident, whose brother was one of the victims, told Addis Standard of seeing 50 dead bodies in Merawi's streets after the massacre. A monk stated that he saw twelve ENDF soldiers take 18 young men out of a bar, beat them, line them up, force them to kneel, and execute them.

Three witnesses interviewed by The Guardian described the victims as having been shot by bullets to the head. Birhanu, a civil servant, stated that identifying the victims was difficult due to their being shot in the head, describing the event as "the sort of thing in horror movies".

The killings continued throughout the night and the morning of 30 January.

== Aftermath ==
On 29 January, the ENDF forbade residents from burying the victims. About 50 victims of the massacre were buried in the cemetery of St Mary church. Four were buried in the Medhanialem Church cemetery; 20 were buried in cemeteries for Muslims; others were buried in rural areas.

== Investigations ==
The Ethiopian Human Rights Commission (EHRC) stated on 6 February 2024 that 80 civilians, mostly men, had been killed in house-to-house searches. On 13 February 2024, the EHRC stated that it had identified 45 of the civilians extrajudicially killed by "government security forces" in the massacre, and that it expected the true number of victims to be higher.

== Reactions ==
=== Domestic ===
On 9 February 2024, the Ethiopian Federal Parliamentary Assembly extended the state of emergency in relation to the Fano insurgency. Daniel Bekele, head of the EHRC, criticised the extension, describing the EHRC as "gravely concerned" about the expected effect of the extension on human rights.

The State of Emergency Investigative Board for the insurgency stated that it would investigate the massacre.

Ethiopian government spokesperson Legesse Tulu stated that the massacre took place in self-defence and did not target civilians. Daniel Kibret, an advisor to Prime Minister Abiy Ahmed, described ENDF operations in Amhara Region as "amazing" and encouraged the Ethiopian military to continue. Tewodrose Tirfe, chair of the Amhara Association of America, described Daniel Kibret's statement as hate speech aiming to justify massacres in the Amhara Region.

=== International ===
The United States (US) ambassador to Ethiopia, Ervin Jose Massinga, described the US government as being "deeply concerned" at "targeted civilian killings" and called for "unfettered access by independent human rights monitors as well as an impartial investigation to ensure the perpetrators are brought to justice".

As of 23 February 2024, Mesfin Tegenu, executive chair of the American Ethiopian Public Affairs Committee, writing in The Hill, said that the massacre had received very little attention from the US media and political elites. He called for the US government to pressure the Ethiopian government to end the state of emergency and withdraw its forces, and for the international community to demand that an independent investigation be held.

== See also ==
- Human rights in Ethiopia
