= Goncha =

District in Amhara Region, Ethiopia

- Woreda
- Flag
- Interactive map of Goncha
- Coordinates: 11°5′N 37°35′E
- Zone: Misraq Gojjam
- Region: Amhara

Area
  - Total: 633.74 km^{2} (244.69 sq mi)

Population (2012 est.)
  - Total: 115,529
  - Density: 182.30/km^{2} (472.15/sq mi)

Goncha is one of the woredas in the Amhara Region of Ethiopia. Part of the Misraq Gojjam Zone, Goncha is bordered on the south, west and north by the Mirab Gojjam Zone, on the east by Hulet Ej Enese, and on the southeast by Bibugn. Goncha was part of Kuarit woreda. It belonged to the Mirab Gojjam Zone but according to the map of UN-OCHA it is part of Misraq Gojjam Zone now.

== Demographics ==
A 2012 estimate puts the population at 115,529. This gives a population density of 182.30 people per square kilometer (244.69 people per square mile), given its area of 633.74 square kilometers (244.69 square miles), higher than the East Gojjam Zone average of 167.94 people per square kilometer (434.95 people per square mile).

Based on the 2007 national census conducted by the Central Statistical Agency of Ethiopia (CSA), this woreda has a total population of 106,688, of whom 53,691 are men and 52,997 women; 4,253 or 3.99% are urban inhabitants.

The majority of the inhabitants practiced Ethiopian Orthodox Christianity, with 99.37% reporting that as their religion.
