= Wemberma =

Wemberma ዎበርማ
- Woreda
- Flag

- Location within Ethiopia
- Coordinates: 10°38′N 36°56′E
- Zone: Mirab Gojjam
- Region: Amhara Region

Area
  - Total: 1,353.77 km^{2} (522.69 sq mi)

Population (2012 est.)
  - Total: 109,908
  - Density: 81.1866/km^{2} (210.272/sq mi)

Wemberma is one of the woredas in the Amhara Region of Ethiopia. Its name comes from the historic district of Wemberma (also transliterated "Wombarma"), which lay north of the Abay River between its tributaries the Zingini and Fatam. Part of West Gojjam Zone Wemberma is bordered on the south by the Abay River which separates it from the Oromia Region and Benishangul-Gumuz Region, on the north by the Agew Awi Zone, and on the east by Bure, Gojjam. The administrative center of Wemberma is Shendi. Wemberma was part of former Bure Wemberma woreda.

== Demographics ==
Based on the 2007 national census conducted by the Central Statistical Agency of Ethiopia (CSA), this woreda has a total population of 100,570, of whom 50,984 are men and 49,586 women; 10,607 or 10.55% are urban inhabitants. The majority of the inhabitants practiced Ethiopian Orthodox Christianity, with 92.18% reporting that as their religion, while 7.53% were Muslim.
