= Yilkal Kefale =

Ethiopian politician

- ይልቃል ክፍያለ

Chief Administrator of Amhara Region
- In office 30 September 2021 – 25 August 2023
- Prime Minister: Abiy Ahmed
- Preceded by: Agegnehu Teshager
- Succeeded by: Arega Kebede

Personal details
- Born: Achefer, Ethiopia
- Party: Prosperity Party
- Other political affiliations: Amhara Democratic Party
- Education: Addis Ababa University

Yilkal Kefale Asres (Amharic: ይልቃል ክፍያለ) is an Ethiopian politician who had served as the governor of the Amhara Region from 2021 to 2023. He was elected as president on 30 September 2021 by State Council of Amhara proposed by the ruling party Prosperity Party. He had previously served as head of Education Bureau of Amhara Regional State.

== Life and political career ==
Yilkal Kefale was born and raised in South Achafer, West Gojjam Zone. He won a seat in South Achafer constituency on behalf of Prosperity Party. On 25 August 2023, Yilkal resigned amidst the conflict in the Amhara Region, citing social, health and family issues. He was replaced by Arega Kebede who led official militia operated by the regional government.
