= Belay Manaye =

Ethiopian journalist

Belay Manaye is an Ethiopian journalist and the co-founder and presenter of the YouTube based news channel, EthioNews Media. His style of journalism covers human rights and politics which led to adverse government backlashes. His journalist work has led to multiple arrests with the first recorded in 2020 according to CPJ’s 2023 prison census.

== Background ==
Belay Manaye was raised in the Amhara Region. He studied Journalism and Communication from Addis Ababa University.

== Career ==
As a professional Ethiopian journalist, he has worked for both state and independent media house. He worked with Amhara Satellite Radio and Television (ASRAT), where he was detained in 2020 with three of his colleagues on the allegations of using media to incite violence. In the same 2020, he co-founded EthioNews with Belete Kassa. He served as the chief editor, co-host and presenter for EthioNews. As of late 2023, EthioNews Media already had 187,000 subscribers.

== Controversies ==
In 2020, Belay Manaye and his colleagues (Mulugeta Anberbir, Mesganawe Kefleng, and ex-colleague, Yonatan Mulugeta) were arrested without being formally charged according to their lawyer, Henok Aklilu. The police, however, accused the journalists of inciting violence by broadcasting reports showing the Amhara people as being repressed and the Ethiopian government as unable to protect them. According to Henok and ASRAT's statement, the four of them were placed in a crowded environment in Addis Ababa Police Commission which was a risk in getting infected with Coronavirus. Manaye was bailed after spending 46 days in detention with no charges.

In 2023, Belay Manaye was arrested on his way back from work without an arrest warrant. He was moved to Awash Arba after spending 26 days detained in the Federal Police Criminal Investigations Bureau for reporting on the fano insurgency in Amhara. After over 6months in detainment he was released and exiled from the country, Ethiopia, with a warning of not also accepting any media interview.
