= Gish Abay =

- Location in Ethiopia
- Coordinates: 10°59′N 37°13′E
- Country: Ethiopia
- Region: Amhara Region
- Zone: Mirab Gojjam Zone
- Elevation: 2,744 m (9,003 ft)

Population (2005)
  - Total: 3,385
- Time zone: UTC+3 (EAT)

Gish Abay is a town in west-central Ethiopia. Located in the Mirab (West) Gojjam Zone of the Amhara Region, it is the administrative center of Sekela woreda. The town is named after the nearby Mount Gish and the Abay River (Blue Nile) whose source is in the foothills of the mountain. It is the administrative center of Sekela woreda.

Based on figures from the Central Statistical Agency in 2005, Gish Abay has an estimated total population of 3,385 of whom 1,615 are men and 1,770 are women. The 1994 census reported this town had a total population of 1,959 of whom 850 were men and 1,109 were women.

== Source of the Blue Nile ==
Gish Abay is best known as the source of the Abay, or Blue Nile, also known as Felege Ghion in Ge'ez, the liturgical language of Ethiopia. In scientific logic based on river basin, the source of Abay (the blue Nile) is Lake Tana. it is basically because the water volume that inters in to lake Tana from Gilgel Abay, Picolo Abay is only one third of the water volume that leaves Lake Tana at the outlet as there are more than 60 rivers that enter into lake Tana among which 5 rivers including Gilgel Abay holds 93% of the Abay river at the outlet of Lake Tana. In which the rest four rivers other than Gilgel Abay originates from Gonder Province. Above all the small springs at Gish-Abay town are by far smaller than the other rivers that join the small spring discharges from Gish-Abay Abay, for example Kelti river from Agew-Awi zone is by far larger than the three springs discharge at Gish-Abay town. Its only the catholic priest Pedro Paez, who described it as the source of Abay on his religious mission to preach Catholic to the orthodox Christians for acceptance by the local people. Felege Ghion consists of three small springs found within a diameter of about 20 meters. These waters are believed to have a healing power and considered holy by the Ethiopian Church. The first European recorded as having visited the source of Blue Nile at Gish Abay is Pedro Páez, a Spanish missionary, who arrived at these springs 21 April 1618. In the 18th century, the culture and religion of the local people of Gish Abay was chronicled in detail by the 18th century explorer, James Bruce. The British Consul Robert Cheesman was one of the later discoverers who published a geographical description of the area. A more recent expedition is made by a group of American navigators who navigate the river from its source at Gish to the Mediterranean Sea, led by geologist Pasquale Scaturro, whose adventure was related in the film Mystery of the Nile.

About 100 meters north of the source of Abay is the church of Gish Abay Felege Ghion Abune Zerabruk Monastery, which has been one of the most respected centers for church education over the past centuries. Although local inhabitants believe the monastery was founded in the 17th century by a local saint called Abune Zerabruk, whose memory is honored with a celebration at the church each year on Tir 13 (January 20), Cheesman speculated that the name of the saint is a corruption of the explorer James Bruce. There is also another church in the town, dedicated to Saint Mary, with considerable spiritual significance. Together with other sites in Sekela woreda, like Fasildes Castle and Lake Gudera, Gish Abay is now identified as a notable tourist destination in Gojjam.

== History ==
The town is founded in a place called Yideb, a mountainous area where Italian occupation forces fortified during the Second Italo-Abyssinian War. During the war, the Italian fort was under constant attack from the local Arbegnoch groups, most notably Dejazmach Zelleke Desta, and the Italians left the fort before the arrival of Haile Selassie and British forces. Then, the area was used as a base for the liberation forces, which attracted the local people to settle at Yideb. The settlement led to the foundation of Gish Abay which soon became an important market center for cereals and cattle. Its development continued until the lack of suitable space on the mountainous area of Yideb limited further expansion, and led in 1987 to the town being re-established at a location much closer to Mount Gish and the source of Abay.

Modern education was introduced in 1952 with the opening of Dejazmach Zelleke Desta Elementary School. Now there are another two schools serving the town: the Gish Abay Elementary and Junior High School, and the Abay Minch Secondary and Preparatory High School. The town is connected by a 39 km gravel road to Tilili, which is located on the main Addis Ababa-Debre Marqos-Bahir Dar road. Another road, which will connect Gish Abay to Adet is also under construction, which will make the distance with Bahir Dar less than 100 km.
