= Dembecha =

Town in Amhara Region, Ethiopia

- Town
- Location within Ethiopia
- Coordinates: 10°3′N 37°29′E
- Country: Ethiopia
- Region: Amhara
- Zone: West Gojjam
- Elevation: 2,083 m (6,834 ft)

Population (2005)
  - Total: 15,008
- Time zone: UTC+3 (EAT)

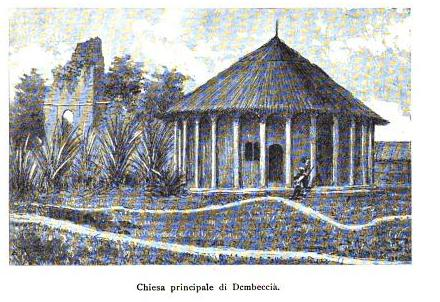
Dembecha Church

Dembecha is a town in northwestern Ethiopia 349 km north of Addis Ababa. Located in the Mirab Gojjam Zone of the Amhara Region, this town has a latitude and longitude of 10°33′N 37°29′E with an elevation of 2083 meters above sea level. It is one of three towns in Dembecha woreda.

Located near Dembecha are hot springs, which are well known and popular throughout Gojjam. Other landmarks include a venerable monastery.

== History ==
Dembecha is mentioned as one of the places which the Emperor Yohannes passed through between 8 May and 18 July 1683 on his journey from Yebaba to Gondar.

Dembecha was included as one of the stages of the Gondar-Boso trade route of the 1840s, according to a list compiled by Antoine Thomson d'Abbadie in his Geodesie d'Ethiopie. The British traveller C.T. Beke stayed several times in this town during 1842, beginning with several days during February 1842 while he waited for Dejazmach Goshu Zewde to complete his homage to Ras Ali and return. Beke described the town at the time as a "large town" located "on the slope of another ridge of the mountains coming from the N.E." He also notes its importance due to its location on one of the principal caravan routes through Gojjam.

As part of the East African Campaign of World War II, Gideon Force encountered a vastly superior Italian force under Colonel Natale near the fort at Dembecha on 5 March 1942. Although defeated in the battle, the British force inflicted such heavy casualties that three days later the Italian garrison was forced to withdraw to Debre Marqos. Seizing this fort allowed the British to isolate Debre Marqos from the rest of the Italian forces.

== Demographics ==
Based on figures from the Central Statistical Agency in 2005, Dembecha has an estimated total population of 15,008, of whom 7,384 are men and 7,624 are women. The 1994 census reported this town had a total population of 8,663 of whom 3,885 were men and 4,775 were women.

== Notes ==
see more:
