= Arega Kebede =

Ethiopian politician: President of Amhara Region since 2023

- አረጋ ከበደ

Chief Administrator of Amhara Region
- Incumbent
- Assumed office 25 August 2023
- President: Sahle-Work Zewde; Taye Atske Selassie
- Prime Minister: Abiy Ahmed
- Preceded by: Yilkal Kefale

Arega Kebede (Amharic: አረጋ ከበደ) is an Ethiopian politician who is serving as Chief Administrator of Amhara Region since 2023. On 25 August 2023, he succeeded Yilkal Kefale amidst security crisis in Amhara Region following clashes between Fano militia and ENDF in early August and six-month state of emergency. He was appointed by Amhara Regional Council in Bahir Dar.

== Career ==
Arega Kebede had served in registration agency director general in Amhara Region. Following the June 2019 coup d'état attempt, he was appointed in Amhara Region Militia Bureau, serving about one year. He succeeded Yilkal Kefale as a President of Amhara Region on 25 August 2023 amidst security crisis in Amhara Region following clashes between Fano militia and ENDF and six-month state of emergency. He sworn in Bahir Dar.
