= Shendi, Ethiopia =

Shendi
- Location in Ethiopia
- Coordinates: 10°38′N 36°56′E
- Country: Ethiopia
- Region: Amhara
- Zone: Mirab Gojjam
- Elevation: 2,050 m (6,730 ft)

Population (2005)
  - Total: 9,293 (est)
- Time zone: UTC+3 (EAT)
- Area code: None

Shendi (or Shendi Gebriel) is a town in western Ethiopia. Located in the Mirab Gojjam Zone of the Amhara Region at elevation of 2050 meters above sea level.

In 1964 it was the administrative center of Wemberma and Gwagussa woreda. Records at the Nordic Africa Institute website provide details of a primary school in Shendi during the year 1968.

== Demographics ==
Based on figures published by the Central Statistical Agency in 2005, Shendi has an estimated total population of 9,293, of whom 4,444 are men and 4,849 are women. It is the main town of Wemberma woreda.

The 1994 national census reported a total population for this town of 5,377, of whom 2,338 were men and 3,039 were women; 18,814 or 8.76% of its population were urban dwellers. The two largest ethnic groups reported in Shendi were the Amhara (96.58%), and the Awi (2.9%) a subgroup of the Agaw; all other ethnic groups made up 0.52% of the population. Amharic was spoken as a first language by 97%, and 2.42% speak Awngi; the remaining 0.58% spoke all other primary languages reported.
