= Bure, Gojjam (woreda) =

Districts in Amhara Region, Ethiopia

- Woreda
- Flag

- Location within Ethiopia
- Coordinates: 10°40′N 36°45′E
- Zone: Mirab Gojjam
- Region: Amhara

Area
  - Total: 800.15 km^{2} (308.94 sq mi)

Population (2012 est.)
  - Total: 158,074
  - Density: 197.56/km^{2} (511.67/sq mi)

Bure is one of the woredas in the West Gojjam Zone of the Amhara Region of Ethiopia. Its name comes from its largest town, Bure. Part of the Mirab Gojjam Zone, Bure is bordered on the south by the Abay River which separates it from the Oromia Region, on the west by Wemberma, on the northwest by the Agew Awi Zone, on the north by Sekela, on the east by Jabi Tehnan, and on the southeast by Dembecha and the Misraq Gojjam Zone. Bure was part of former Bure Wemberma woreda.

== Demographics ==
Based on the 2007 national census conducted by the Central Statistical Agency of Ethiopia (CSA), this woreda has a total population of 143,132, of whom 71,208 are men and 71,924 women; 25,975 or 18.15% are urban inhabitants. The majority of the inhabitants practiced Ethiopian Orthodox Christianity, with 98.34% reporting that as their religion, while 1.01% were Muslim.
