= Dembecha (woreda) =

District in Amhara Region, Ethiopia

Coordinates: 10°40′N 37°10′E

Dembecha Zuria
- Woreda
- Flag
- Interactive map of Dembecha Zuria
- Zone: Mirab Gojjam
- Region: Amhara

Area
  - Total: 971.29 km^{2} (375.02 sq mi)

Population (2012 est.)
  - Total: 141,912
  - Density: 146.11/km^{2} (378.41/sq mi)

Dembecha Zuria is one of the woredas in the Amhara Region of Ethiopia. Part of the Mirab Gojjam Zone, Dembecha is bordered on the west by Bure, on the northwest by Jabi Tehnan, on the north by Dega Damot, and on the east and south by the Misraq Gojjam Zone. Towns in Dembecha include Addis Alem, Dembecha and Yechereka.

Rivers in this woreda include the Temchi, over which the Italian Count Salimbeni built the first bridge in Gojjam for Negus Tekle Haymanot in 1884–1885. Near the town of Dembecha are hot springs which were both well known and popular throughout Gojjam.

== Demographics ==
Based on the 2007 national census conducted by the Central Statistical Agency of Ethiopia (CSA), this woreda has a total population of 129,260, an increase of 44.50% over the 1994 census, of whom 64,683 are men and 64,577 women; 17,913 or 13.86% are urban inhabitants. With an area of 971.29 square kilometers, Dembecha has a population density of 133.08, which is less than the Zone average of 158.25 persons per square kilometer. A total of 30,731 households were counted in this woreda, resulting in an average of 4.21 persons to a household, and 29,608 housing units. The majority of the inhabitants practiced Ethiopian Orthodox Christianity, with 99.13% reporting that as their religion.

The 1994 national census reported a total population for this woreda of 89,456 in 16,256 households, of whom 44,820 were men and 44,636 were women; 11,493 or 12.85% of its population were urban dwellers. The largest ethnic group reported in Dembecha was the Amhara (99.82%). Amharic was spoken as a first language by 99.87%. The majority of the inhabitants practiced Ethiopian Orthodox Christianity, with 98.47% reporting that as their religion, while 1.46% were Muslim.
