= Feres Bet =

Feres Bet (Amharic: ፈረስ ቤት), is a small town found in the Amhara Region, West Gojjam Zone, Ethiopia. It is the Capital city of the district of Dega Damot. The town is about 50 km away to the north east of Demebecha town.
