= Segenet Kelemu =

Ethiopian plant pathologist

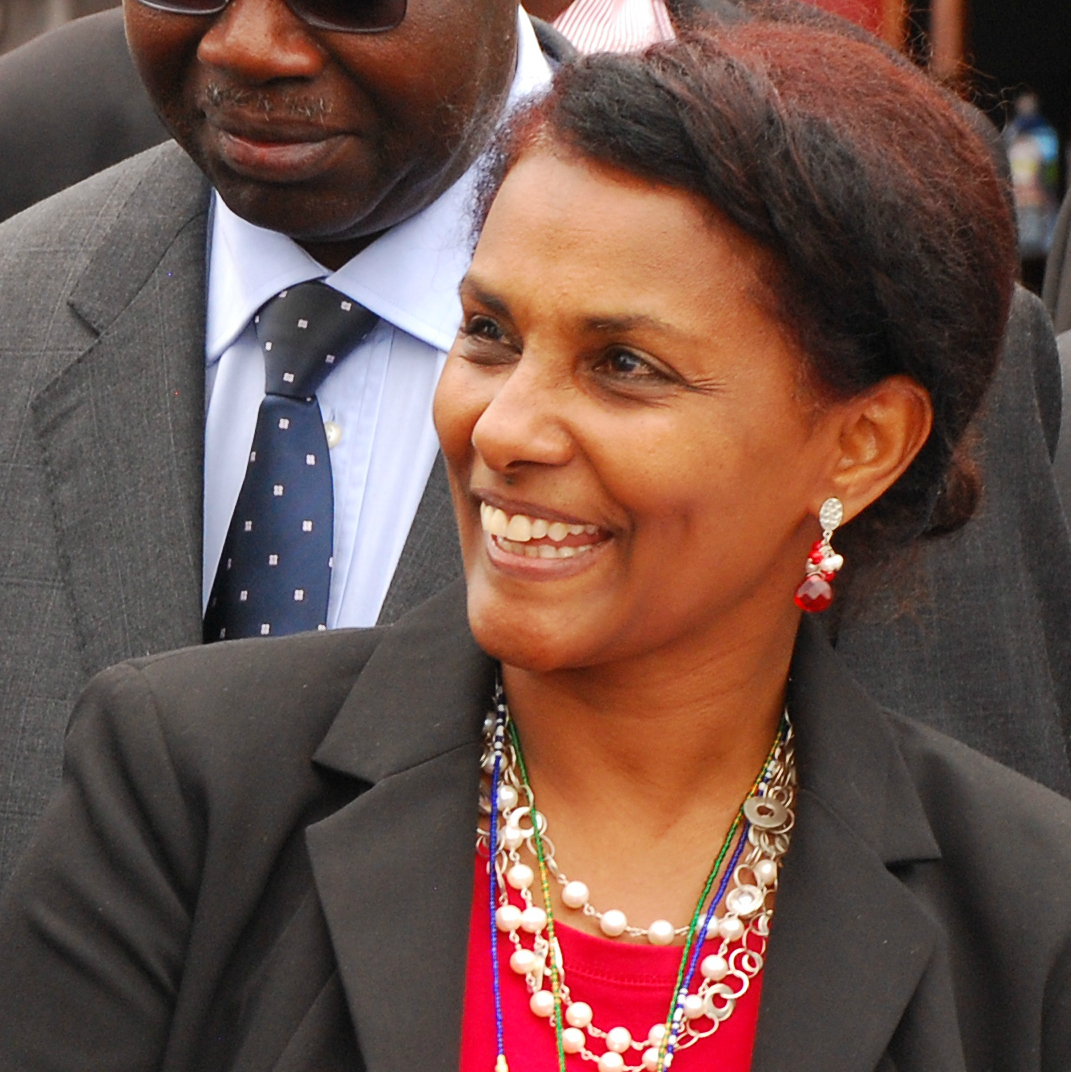
- Born: Finote Selam, Ethiopia
- Education: Addis Ababa University, (BS) Ethiopia; Montana State University, (MS); Kansas State University, (PhD); Cornell University, (postdoc)
- Awards: L'Oréal-UNESCO Awards for Women in Science (2014)

Segenet Kelemu is an Ethiopian scientist, noted for her research as a molecular plant pathologist and her outstanding scientific leadership. For close to three decades, Segenet and her team's research has contributed to addressing agricultural constraints in Africa, Asia, Latin America and North America.

From November 2013 - December 2023, Segenet was the Director General of the International Centre of Insect Physiology and Ecology, Africa's only institute dedicated to research on insects and other arthropods. Previously, she was the Director of Biosciences eastern and central Africa (BecA); Vice President of Programs at the Alliance for a Green Revolution in Africa (AGRA), and Leader of Crop and Agroecosystem Health Management at the International Center for Tropical Agriculture (CIAT).

Segenet has received many international accolades including: the L'Oréal-UNESCO Awards for Women in Science in 2014; Fellow, TWAS − The World Academy of Sciences; honorary doctorate by Tel Aviv University, in May 2016; recognition as one of Forbes Africa top 100 most influential African women, in May 2014; mentioned as one of 10 most influential African women in agriculture by the Journal of Gender, Agriculture and Food Security (AgriGender Journal) and election as a Fellow of the African Academy of Sciences. Her other honours include: CIAT's Outstanding Senior Scientist Award; Friendship Award granted by the People's Republic of China and the TWAS Prize for Agricultural Sciences, by TWAS, The World Academy of Sciences.

== Early life ==
Segenet Kelemu was born in the Ethiopian town of Finote Selam. In school, Segenet, though prone to challenging and contradicting teachers, demonstrated self-determination and, above all, academic prowess. She was fortunate to have teachers who recognized and nurtured her potential.

Like many other children in her village, Segenet was expected to help out with farming chores. Moreover, from an early age, she displayed a strong sense of responsibility, and as a result, her mother assigned her the task of selling farm produce in the market; certain that she would negotiate the best prices and keep the money safe. Thus, Kelemu learnt the hard truths about agriculture: its back breaking labour—especially for women, as well challenges to productivity, which placed people in her community in a constant struggle to meet minimum households food needs; but amidst all, the sector's potential. As a result, she felt a calling to seek solutions for agricultural constraints. Therefore, though an all-round top grade student, Segenet decided to dedicate herself to science and agriculture.

== Education ==
Segenet Kelemu from "The Mind of the Universe" series

In 1974, Segenet became the first woman from her region to join Addis Ababa University—where she was one of a handful girls in a class of 200—graduating, on top of her class, with a Bachelor's degree in 1979. She then relocated to the US. At Montana State University, she earned a master's degree in plant pathology and genetics in 1985. She subsequently attended Kansas State University, earning a PhD in molecular biology and plant pathology in 1989. Her PhD thesis was "Molecular cloning and characterization of an avirulence gene from Xanthomonas campestris pv. oryzae". Kelemu undertook postdoctoral research on the molecular determinants of pathogenesis at Cornell University from 1989 to 1992.

== Career ==
Between 1992 and 2007, Segenet worked at the International Center for Tropical Agriculture (CIAT), Colombia, first as a Senior Scientist, and later Leader of Crop and Agroecosystem Health Management. Her research focused on elucidation of molecular determinants of host-pathogen interactions, development of novel plant disease control strategies including genetic engineering, biopesticides, pathogen population genetics and dynamics, endophytic microbes and their role in plant development. In August 2007, Segenet decided to return to Africa, determined to contribute her experience in applying cutting-edge science to developmental issues, towards resolving the continent's problem. She accepted a position as the Director of the Biosciences eastern and central Africa (BecA) Hub. Under her leadership, the BecA initiative was transformed from a contentious idea into a driving force that is changing the face of African biosciences. BecA's research capacity, staff, facilities, funding, partners and training programs have expanded at an ever accelerating pace. She has assembled and inspired a scientific and technical team bound by a common passion for using science to enhance Africa's biosciences development. In 2013, Kelemu joined the Alliance for a Green Revolution in Africa (AGRA) as Vice President for Programs for about a year. In November 2013, Segenet became the Director General of the International Centre of Insect Physiology and Ecology (ICIPE), Africa's only institution dedicated to research on insects and other arthropods, which is headquartered in Nairobi, Kenya. She is the fourth chief executive and the first woman to head the institution.

In January 2018, Segenet was singled out by philanthropist Bill Gates as one of five "heroes [whose] lives inspire me".

== Awards and recognitions ==
2026	Royal Society	Elected Fellow
2025	Business Day, Nigeria	Featured among 9 influential Africans
2024	Technology Networks	Featured in an e-Book titled, Women in Science: Inspiring the Next Generation
2024	Africa Report	Dr Kelemu was featured in the Africa Report series of Top 50 Influential Africans: The Brains category. Her story is sub-headed: 'Plant science to feed the world'.
2023	International Society of Plant Pathology	Elected Fellow
2023	President of the French Republic	Dr Kelemu was awarded the title of Officier de L’Ordre national du Mérite (Officer in the National Order of Merit), by the President of the French Republic.
2023	Ben-Gurion University of the Negev, Israel	Honorary Doctorate degree of Doctor of Philosophy Honoris Causa
2022	Ellis Island Medal of Honor	The Medal recognizes individuals who have made it their mission to share with those less fortunate, their wealth of knowledge, indomitable courage, boundless compassion, unique talents and selfless generosity.
2022	United Nations Economic Commission for Africa (ECA)	Dr Kelemu is one of the scientists featured in a publication titled, Earth, Oceans and Skies: Insights from selected, outstanding African women scientists, published by the United Nations Economic Commission for Africa (ECA).
2022	Enat Bank, Ethiopia	Named its 94th branch, located in Addis Ababa, after Dr Kelemu, in honour of her excellence in the world of science.
2022	Doha Debates	On 7 June, Doha Debates announced that the latest individual honoured in their SolvingIt series is Dr Segenet Kelemu, one of Africa’s leading scientists and a role model for women in science and research around the world.
2021	The Borgen Project	Dr Kelemu was recognised among brilliant women breaking barriers, improving global health, and inspiring others to pursue careers in science, a ‘modern Marie Curie’, by The Borgen Project, in honour of International Women and Girls in Science Day and International Women’s Day, 2021.
2019	Swedish Academy of Agriculture and Forestry International Fellow	The Fellows are chosen for their work as related to the academy's mission: "To promote agriculture and forestry and associated activities with the support of science and practical experience and in the interest of society."
2019	Distinguished Alumni Fellow of Kansas State University, USA	The Fellows are chosen based on their high levels of professional accomplishment and distinguished service in their respective careers
2019	Science Honoree of the Donald Danforth Plant Science Center	Each year, the Center acknowledges an exceptional individual who has had extraordinary impact in agriculture, food nutrition, or human health.
2018	Woman of the Decade in Natural and Sustainable Ecosystems	The award is the highest honour conferred by the Women Economic Forum (WEF) for outstanding leadership. A global conference of the ALL Ladies League (ALL), WEF is the largest women chamber in the world, with about 70,000 members in 150 countries.
2018	Bill Gates ‘Heroes in the Field’	The ‘Heroes in the Field’ are individuals who are using their talents to fight poverty, hunger and disease, and providing opportunities for the next generation. The ‘heroes in the field’ were featured in a Time magazine article guest edited by Mr. Gates; a short video that he has narrated on his blog; on the Bill & Melinda Gates Foundation Facebook page and through a series of tweets from Mr. Gates
2017	The Mind of the Universe	The Mind is an ideological cross media project. It will be the first open source TV series ever, providing the whole series for free to all countries in the world in order to 'spread knowledge'.
2016	Honorary doctorate by Tel Aviv University, Israel	Over the past 50 years, Tel Aviv University has conferred honorary doctorates to remarkable figures in recognition of their professional and philanthropic contributions to society. Kelemu was honoured for pioneering role for women scientists in Africa; commitment in directing major efforts for the transformation of African agriculture; international acclaim as recipient of prestigious awards; service on advisory boards of key international institutions; and her support in the establishment of the Manna Center Program in Food Safety and Security of Tel Aviv University.
2016	Fellow, TWAS, The World Academy of Sciences	TWAS Fellows consist of the developing world's most prestigious scientists.
2014	L'Oréal-UNESCO For Women in Science Awards	The L'Oréal-UNESCO For Women in Science programme recognises achievements and contributions of exceptional females across the globe, by awarding promising scientists with Fellowships to help further their research.
2014	Top 100 most influential African women list by Forbes Africa	Forbes is a global media company, focusing on business, investing, technology, entrepreneurship, leadership, and lifestyle.
2014	10 most influential African women in agriculture	Awarded by the Journal of Gender, Agriculture and Food Security (AgriGender Journal)
2014	Fellow, African Academy of Sciences	The African Academy of Sciences fellowships is awarded to scientists who have excelled in their respective fields of expertise.
2011	TWAS Prize for Agricultural Sciences	The TWAS Prizes are awarded to individual scientists from developing countries in recognition of an outstanding contribution to scientific knowledge.
2006	Friendship Award granted by the People's Republic of China	The Award is the People's Republic of China's highest award for "foreign experts who have made outstanding contributions to the country's economic and social progress.
date	Outstanding Scientist of the Year	Awarded by the International Center for Tropical Agriculture (CIAT)

== Advisory boards ==
Date	Board	Details	Designation
2021	International Basic Science Programme (IBSP)	member of the Scientific Board of IBSP, the only international forum in the United Nations that makes recommendations to the Director-General of UNESCO and its Member States on the global situation of the basic sciences.	
2020	Global Action for Fall Armyworm Control	Launched in 2019 by the Food and Agriculture Organization of the United Nations (FAO), and chaired by the Director General of FAO, the three-year global initiative will take radical, direct and coordinated measures to strengthen prevention and sustainable pest control capacities at a global level.	Vice Chair
2020	Australian Centre for International Agricultural Research (ACIAR), Government of Australia	Dr Kelemu shares her expertise to help ACIAR investment in research for development to have the biggest impact	Policy Advisory Council Member
2018 -- present	Advisory Board, End Hunger Sustainably	The initiative aims to build the evidence base to achieve the SDGs.	Panel member
2020	Falling Walls Conference, Life Sciences Jury Session	Since its inception, the conference has become a unique global platform connecting science, business and society through a shared commitment to create breakthrough solutions to challenges across borders and disciplines.	Jury member
2017	Boris Mints Institute prize	The prize, which started in 2017, will award USD 100,000 to an exceptional individual who has devoted their research and academic life to solving a strategic global challenge.	Member, Evaluation Panel
2016	National Science and Technology Council of Rwanda	The National Science and Technology Council of Rwanda is the governing body of the country's National Commission of Science and Technology (NCST)	Member, of the 11 member Council, which was appointed by Rwanda's Cabinet Meeting of 9 December 2016, chaired by the President of the Republic, His Excellency Paul Kagame.
2016	United Nations University (UNU)	UNU is an autonomous UN organisation that conducts research, postgraduate training and the dissemination of knowledge.	Member, UNU Governing Council, at the invitation of United Nations Under Secretary General.
2016	Rolex Awards for Enterprise	The Rolex Awards honour individuals who have, or are, developing ground-breaking initiatives that have the potential to improve life on the planet.	Member, eminent judging panel of the 2016 series of the Rolex Awards marked the 40th anniversary of this global philanthropic program.
2015	L'Oreal-UNESCO Sub-Saharan for Women in Science Award Jury.	The L'Oréal-UNESCO Award for Women in Science aims to improve the position of women in science by recognizing outstanding women researchers who have contributed to scientific progress.	Juror
2015	The Louis Malassis and Olam Prizes Jury	Agropolis Fondation's Louis Malassis International Scientific Prize is given once every two years. It aims to recognize individuals for their exemplary and promising contribution in promoting innovation through research, development and/or capacity building in order to improve food and agricultural systems sustainability as well as to address food security and poverty reduction.	Juror

== Personal life ==
Segenet Kelemu was married to Arjan Gijsman, who died in June 2021, and has a daughter named Finote Gijsman. She resides in Nairobi. She enjoys reading biographies.
