= Spillover of the Fano insurgency =

Since the beginning, the Fano insurgency expanded its warzone over Oromia Region and the Western Zone in Tigray Region with asymmetric involvement of the Oromo Liberation Army (OLA), the Tigray Defense Forces (TDF) and the Ethiopian National Defense Force (ENDF). Some sources predicted that the war could lead into a civil war. After the bloody Tigray War, both TPLF and the Ethiopian government signed peace agreement in Pretoria on 2 November 2022. After the Nairobi agreement, Tigrayan forces ordered to disarm, and the full sovereignty of the region restored which allowed humanitarian access. In January 2023, Tigrayan officials reported that Amhara and Eritrean troops yet not leaving the Western Tigray. The Amhara officials claim the area after the restoration of its people and consequent referendum held.

The Amhara militia Fano accused of ethnic massacre against ethnic Oromos and Tigrayans, causing both groups to form the United Front of Ethiopian Federalist and Confederalist Forces (UFEFCF).

== Oromia Region ==
During the onset of the war in April 2023, the Fano militia also speculated to carried out cleansing of ethnic Oromos within their territory. In March 2021, the Oromo Liberation Army (OLA) militants began offensive targeted to ethnic Amhara occupied zone in Oromia, forcing Amharas to leave Oromia. As of June 2022, about 200 Amharas killed in Amhara-majority parts of Oromia.

The war began amidst negotiation between OLA and the federal government took place in Tanzania. On 16 September 2024, OLA militants carried out attacks on Amhara civilians in the area of Efratana-Gidim woreda in North Shewa Zone. The militants believed to be armed allegedly by the regime officials. A 2023 report revealed that 740 people in the Amhara region and 366 in Oromia were killed in 160 incidents that year.

== Western Tigray Zone ==
The first confrontation of Amhara and Tigray clash was occurred in February 2024 in Southern Tigray zone. The clash happened as the Interim Regional Administration of Tigray President reported that over 270,000 troops were disarmed. However, the clash is minor with no fatalities record and short.

Clashes took place on 14 February in Chercher, Raya Bala, and Raya Alamata woredas in Southern Tigray zone, and on 15 February near Alamata and Korem towns before ENDF forces intervened. Renewed clashes also occurred in Korem town and Ashenge kebele, Ofla woreda before ENDF intervened again. On the same date, the Red Cross vehicle was damaged by anonymous gunmen near Korem. The final battle was restarted on 21 February in Zatta woreda before ENDF troops intervention.
