= Kuarit =

District in Amhara Region, Ethiopia

Coordinates: 11°10′N 37°15′E

Kuarit ቋሪት
- Woreda
- Flag
- Interactive map of Kuarit
- Zone: Mirab Gojjam
- Region: Amhara

Area
  - Total: 602.99 km^{2} (232.82 sq mi)

Population (2012 est.)
  - Total: 124,309
  - Density: 206.15/km^{2} (533.94/sq mi)

Kuarit (also Quarit, Amharic: ቋሪት) is one of the woredas in the Amhara Region of Ethiopia. Part of the Mirab Gojjam Zone, Kuarit is bordered on the southwest by Jabi Tehnan, on the west by Sekela, on the north by Yilmana Densa, on the east by the Misraq Gojjam Zone, and on the southeast by Dega Damot. The major town in Kuarit is Gebeze Mariam. Goncha woreda was separated from Kuarit.

The highest point in this woreda and in the West Gojjam Zone is Mount Amedamit, a part of the Mount Choqa, with an elevation of 3,619 metres (11,873 ft). Mount Adama, from which the river Birr one of the tributaries of Blue Nile river starts its flow is one of the highest peaks in the woreda. It was at the foot of this mountain that the Battle of Amedamit was fought on 6 October 1620 between Ras Sela Kristos, half-brother of the Emperor Susenyos of Ethiopia, and a group of rebels who opposed Susenyos' Pro-Catholic beliefs. The rebels were crushed.

== Demographics ==
Based on the 2007 national census conducted by the Central Statistical Agency of Ethiopia (CSA), this woreda has a total population of 114,771, an increase of -16.49% over the 1994 census, of whom 56,767 are men and 58,004 women; 4,750 or 4.14% are urban inhabitants. With an area of 602.99 square kilometres, Kuarit has a population density of 190.34, which is greater than the Zone average of 158.25 people per square kilometre. There were 25,402 households (giving an average of 4.52 people per household) and 24,927 housing units. The majority of the inhabitants practiced Ethiopian Orthodox Christianity, with 99.96% reporting that as their religion.

The 1994 national census reported a total population for this woreda of 137,437 in 27,875 households, of whom 69,044 were men and 68,393 were women; 2,008 or 1.46% of its population were urban dwellers. The largest ethnic group reported in Kuarit was the Amhara (99.95%). Amharic was spoken as a first language by 99.9%. The majority of the inhabitants practiced Ethiopian Orthodox Christianity, with 99.9% reporting that as their religion.

== Tourist attractions ==
- Haregewoyin cave, which is over 10 kilometre away and very attractive. Used by the local people as a shelter during the summer season.
- Gragn Ahmed standing land stone
- Ambaw washa
