= 2023 Ethiopian state of emergency =

- Date: 4 August 2023 – 6 June 2024
- Location: Ethiopia
- Cause: 2023 Fano–ENDF clashes

A six-month state of emergency was declared on 4 August 2023 by the Ethiopian government in response to severe conflict and instabilities in Amhara Region after the Amhara militia Fano and the Ethiopian National Defense Force (ENDF) clashed in several locations in the region on 1 August. On 3 August, the Amhara Region government requested additional help to the federal troops. The fighting is the most serious security crisis since the Tigray War.

Prime Minister Abiy Ahmed stated on the declaration issue that "it was found necessary to declare a state of emergency as it had become difficult to control this outrageous activity based on the regular legal system." The state of emergency restrictions include a ban on public gatherings, warrantless arrests, as well as imposing of curfew. Internet access has been blocked and Ethiopian Airlines flights to Gondar and Lalibela have been cancelled until the ENDF military retook the towns after a week since the start of the clash. The state of emergency ended on 6 June 2024 after postponed in February 2024.

== Aftermath ==
Following their control of Amhara towns, the Ethiopian parliament issued arbitrary arrest and searches for civilians without warrant on 13 August. The Ethiopian Federal Police arrested hundred people in Addis Ababa. The measure was criticized by the Ethiopian Human Rights Commission stating "there has been widespread arrest of civilians who are of ethnic Amhara origin." Many activists called out the arbitrary arrest, saying it was targeted to ethnic Amharas. Suspects were captivated in schools, police stations and temporary detention centers after moving to streets.
