= Sekela =

Sekela ሰከላ
- Woreda
- Flag
- Interactive map of Sekela
- Coordinates: 11°10′N 37°00′E
- Zone: Mirab Gojjam
- Region: Amhara Region

Area
  - Total: 768.83 km^{2} (296.85 sq mi)

Population (2012 est.)
  - Total: 150,376
  - Density: 195.59/km^{2} (506.58/sq mi)

Sekela (Amharic: ሰከላ) is one of the woredas in the Amhara Region of Ethiopia. Part of the West Gojjam Zone, Sekela is bordered on the southwest by Bure, on the west by the Agew Awi Zone, on the north by Mecha, on the northeast by Yilmana Densa, on the east by Kuarit, and on the southeast by Jabi Tehnan. The administrative center of Sekela is Gish Abay.

== Overview ==
The Lesser Abay River, commonly considered to be the uppermost reach of the Blue Nile, originates in this woreda, and flows north into Lake Tana.

In June 2002, heavy rains caused flooding and landslides in nine kebeles in Sekela and neighboring woredas, which covered or completely washed away more than 1,200 hectares (3,000 acres) of land planted in crops, and destroyed about 8600 quintals of harvested crops. One person and more than a hundred animals died in this disaster.

== Demographics ==
Based on the 2007 national census conducted by the Central Statistical Agency of Ethiopia (CSA), this woreda has a total population of 138,691, an increase of 61.36% over the 1994 census, of whom 69,018 are men and 69,673 women; 6,779 or 4.89% are urban inhabitants. With an area of 768.83 km^{2} (296.85 sq mi), Sekela has a population density of 180.39 inhabitants per square kilometre (467.2/sq mi), which is greater than the zone average of 158.25. A total of 29,908 households were counted in this woreda, resulting in an average of 4.64 persons to a household, and 29,093 housing units. The majority of the inhabitants practiced Ethiopian Orthodox Christianity, with 99.97% reporting that as their religion.

The 1994 national census reported a total population for this woreda of 85,950 in 17,216 households, of whom 43,616 were men and 42,334 were women; 1,959 or 2.28% of its population were urban dwellers. The largest ethnic group reported in Sekela was the Amhara (99.93%). Amharic was spoken as a first language by 99.95%. The majority of the inhabitants practiced Ethiopian Orthodox Christianity, with 99.96% reporting that as their religion.
