= Sasit =

Town in Amhara Region, Ethiopia

Coordinates: 9°55′N 39°29′E

Sasit is a small town in Ethiopia, Amhara state, close to 90 kilometres north of Debre Birhan. The town is known for its agricultural produce and historical sites.

== History ==
Sasit was founded in 1938, by Fascist Italy following the Second Italo-Ethiopian war.

=== 2024 Airstrike ===
On February 23, 2024, an Ethiopian drone struck a vehicle dropping off passengers near Sasit, leading to the deaths of 30 civilians, with 18 injured.

== Historical sites ==
The historical sites in and around Sasit are Andit Girar, a place where Ethiopian soldiers founded their association to fight against Italian occupiers. The Engidwahsa cave is also an area of interest in Sasit. This limestone cave was a shelter for local patriots who were fighting the occupiers. There are historical churches including the well known Nechgedel Beata, Dagmawi Tsion St. Mary's church and other monasteries.
