= Government of Amhara Region =

Ethiopian regional government

Regional Government of Amhara የአማራ ክልል መንግሥት
- Regional State
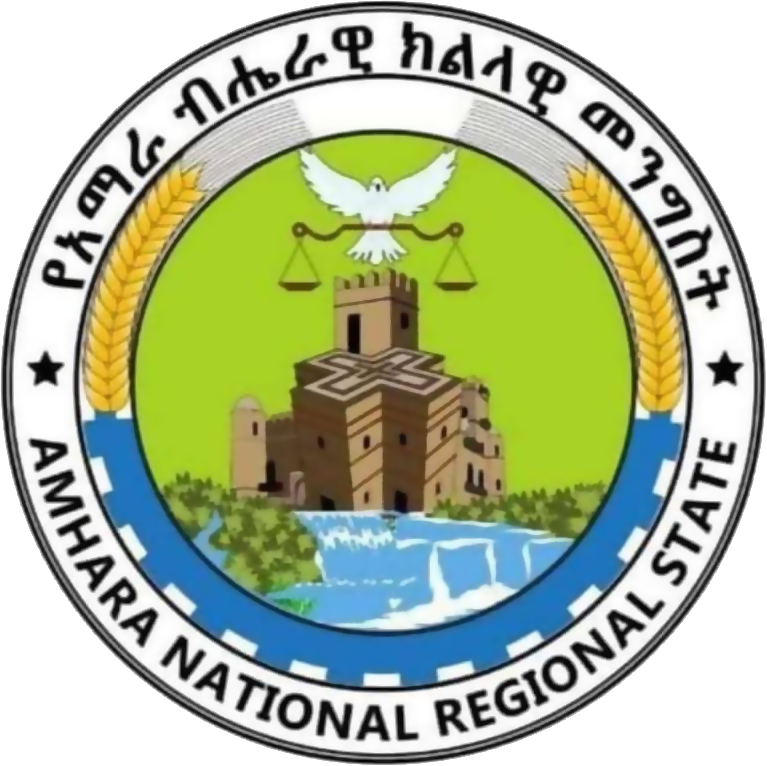
- Flag of Amhara Region, used across the government (left); and the Amhara Region Emblem (right)
- Formation: 1992; 34 years ago
- Founding document: 2001-REVISED CONSTITUTION OF THE AMHARA NATIONAL REGIONAL STATE
- Country: Ethiopia

Legislative (The Regional Council)
- Legislature: Regional Parliament (The Regional Council)
- Meeting place: Amhara Legislative Building, Bahir Dar, Amhara

Executive (President)
- Head of government: President Arega Kebede
- Main organ: Council of the Regional Government (Cabinet)

Judicial (Regional Court)
- Court: Regional Supreme Court (highest court)

The government of Amhara Region is composed of the executive branch, led by the President; the legislative branch, which comprises the Regional Council; and the judicial branch, which is led by the Regional Supreme Court. The Amhara Region alongside almost all other regions are based on a singular ethnicity excluding Chartered Cities -Addis Ababa, and Dire Dawa- and the former Southern Nations, Nationalities, and Peoples' Region.

== Executive branch ==
The executive branch is headed by the President of Amhara. The current president is Arega Kebede, a member of the Prosperity Party elected in September 2021 upon the appointment of his predecessor, Agegnehu Teshager, as Speaker of the House of Federation. The Vice President of Amhara succeeds the president in the event of any removal from office, and performs any duties assigned by the president. The other offices in the executive branch cabinet are the Regional Health Bureau, Educational Bureau, and 20 other officials. The president of the region also is the chair-person of the Governing Council. There has only been one assassination attempt and that was during the 2019 coup attempt which resulted in the death of then president of Amhara Ambachew Mekonnen, then chief of staff of the ENDF Se'are Mekonnen and Aide-de-Camp Maj. General Gizae Aberra.

=== President ===
The President of the Region is charged with leading the Council of the Regional Government and selecting his Vice-President and giving him his duties.

==== The Presidents assigned roles according to the constitution are as follows ====
1. Provide leadership to, coordinate and represent the council of the regional government;
2. Sign and convey, within 15 days of their deliberation and approval by both the legislative and Executive Councils of the Regional State, those proclamations and regulations so that they would be promulgated through the Zikre Hig Gazette of the regional state;
3. Oversee the implementation of policies, regulations, the directives and decisions issued by the council of the regional government;
4. Nominate or propose the President and Vice President of the Regional Supreme court as the Auditor-General and Deputy Auditor-General of the Regional State and thereby secure their respective appointments by the Regional Council;
5. Put forward the proposed appointment of those Bureau Heads wished to become members of the Council of the Regional Government, including the Deputy Head of Government, and get their final approval by the regional council;
6. Without prejudice to what has been stipulated under the provisions of /D/ and /E/ of sub-art, 3 of this Article hereof, provisionally assign and employ the above-mentioned office heads, with the exception of the Deputy Head of Government, when and wherever faced with the situation in which the Regional Council has been unable to convene for its normal duties;
7. Select and appoint Bureau heads, deputy Bureau Heads, commissioners and other officials thereof outside those members of the council of the regional government
8. With details to be outlined and determined in a regulation which shall have been issued by the Council of the Regional Government, establish official agencies of administrative areas as well as appoint administrators and other branch office heads empowered to represent the regional government and render an all-out support to the woredas, in places selected having regard to their needs and requirements, outside the territorial limit of the Nationality Administrations;
9. Direct and supervise over the region-wide security and police forces established with the view to protecting the safety of the national-regional state and enforcement of law and order therein;
10. Provide leadership to, coordinate and supervise over the activities of subordinate administrative hierarchies within the Regional State;
11. Perform such other functions as may be entrusted to him by the council of the regional government and the regional state council respectively.

=== Deputy Head of Government ===
The deputy head of government (vice president) is appointed to the position by the President of the Amhara Region and is held accountable to both the President and the Regional Council.

==== Deputy Head of Government duties ====
1. Carry out such functions as may specifically be referred to him by the Head and the Council of the Regional Government;
2. Formally represent the Head of Government in the absence of the latter or is unable to perform his normal duties.

== Judicial branch ==
There are three levels of the Amhara state judiciary. The lowest level is the court of common pleas: each woreda maintains its own constitutionally mandated court of common pleas, which maintain jurisdiction over all justiciable matters. The intermediate-level court system is the district court system. Four courts of appeals exist, each retaining jurisdiction over appeals from common pleas, municipal, and county courts in an administrative zone. A case heard in this system is decided by a three-judge panel, and each judge is elected.

The highest-ranking court, the Amhara Supreme Court, is Amhara's "court of last resort". A seven-justice panel composes the court, which, by its own discretion, hears appeals from the courts of appeals, and retains original jurisdiction over limited matters. The chief judge is called the President of Amhara Supreme Court (Yeneneh Simegn). The President nominates the president and vice president of the Supreme Court to the Regional Council who then appoint them to the position. All other judges in Amhara are appointed to their positions by the Regional Council upon the Regional Commission of Judicial Administration's recommendation.

In the countryside, traditional courts are established, in Amhara they're called 'Shemagelle' (elder) and disputes can be brought to them instead of the formal court system.

== Legislative branch ==
The Regional Council, which is the highest administrative body of the state, is made up of 294 members. They are charged with electing a President amongst themselves and confirming appointments such as Supreme Court Judges. They are allowed to levy taxes on agriculture and collect royalties for deforestation.

== Administrative zones ==
Like other regions in Ethiopia, Amhara is subdivided into administrative zones. It's composed of 11 zones, and 145 Weredas.

- Agew Awi
- East Gojjam
- Oromia zone
- North Gondar
- North Shewa
- North Wollo
- South Gondar
- South Wollo
- Wag Hemra
- West Gojjam
- Bahir Dar (special zone)
- Ma'ekelawi Gondar [Central Gondar]
- Mi'erab Gondar [West Gondar]

== National politics ==
Amhara is represented by 138 representatives in the Federal Democratic Republic of Ethiopia House of Peoples' Representatives. All Representatives belong to the Prosperity Party federally. The Regional Government of Amhara recently annexed Welkait from Tigray during the Tigray War and administers the territory.
