= Dega Damot =

District in Amhara Région, Ethiopia

Coordinates: 11°05′N 37°25′E

- Woreda
- Flag
- Interactive map of Dega Damot
- Zone: Mirab Gojjam
- Region: Amhara

Area
  - Total: 831.23 km^{2} (320.94 sq mi)

Population (2012 est.)
  - Total: 165,063
  - Density: 198.58/km^{2} (514.31/sq mi)

Dega Damot (Amharic: ደጋ ዳሞት) is one of the woredas in the Amhara Region of Ethiopia. Part of the Mirab Gojjam Zone, Dega Damot is bordered on the south by Dembecha, on the southwest by Jabi Tehnan, on the west by Kuarit, and on the north and east by the Misraq Gojjam Zone. The major town in Dega Damot is Feres Bet.

== Demographics ==
Based on the 2007 national census conducted by the Central Statistical Agency of Ethiopia (CSA), this woreda has a total population of 152,343, an increase of 16.35% over the 1994 census, of whom 75,005 are men and 77,338 women; 6,699 or 4.40% are urban inhabitants. With an area of 831.23 square kilometers, Dega Damot has a population density of 183.27, which is greater than the Zone average of 158.25 persons per square kilometer. A total of 33,336 households were counted in this woreda, resulting in an average of 4.57 persons to a household, and 32,497 housing units. The majority of the inhabitants practiced Ethiopian Orthodox Christianity, with 99.92% reporting that as their religion.

The 1994 national census reported a total population for this woreda of 130,939 in 26,453 households, of whom 65,388 were men and 65,661 were women; 1,696 or 1.3% of its population were urban dwellers. The largest ethnic group reported in Dega Damot was the Amhara (99.95%). Amharic was spoken as a first language by 99.97%. The majority of the inhabitants practiced Ethiopian Orthodox Christianity, with 99.95% reporting that as their religion.
