= Majete =

Town in Amhara Region, Ethiopia

- Town
- Location within Ethiopia
- Coordinates: 10°44′N 39°50′E
- Country: Ethiopia
- Region: Amhara
- Zone: Semien (North) Shewa

Population (2005)
  - Total: 7,487
- Time zone: UTC+3 (EAT)

Majete is a town in north-eastern Ethiopia. Located in the Semien Shewa Zone of the Amhara Region. This town has a latitude and longitude of 10°44′N 39°50′E.

Based on figures from the Central Statistical Agency in 2018, the town had a population of 221 as compared to 2005 where Karakore had an estimated total population of 10,859 of whom 5,553 were males and 5,306 were females. The 1994 census reported this town had a total population of 6,247 of whom 2,922 were males and 3,325 were females. It is one of two towns in Antsokiyana Gemza woreda.
