= North Shewa Zone =

North Shewa Zone may refer to:

- North Shewa Zone (Amhara), Amhara Region, Ethiopia
- North Shewa Zone (Oromia), Oromia Region, Ethiopia
