= Mount Amedamit =

Mountain in Ethiopia

Coordinates: 11.124965°N 37.356494°E

Mount Amedamit (also Mount Adama) is an Ethiopian mountain or peak in the Amhara Region, it is the highest point in West Gojjam (part of Kuarit woreda), at 3,619 metres (11,873 ft) elevation. The mountain is in the Northern Ethiopian Highlands. It can be considered a subsidiary peak of Mount Choqa, whose main peak is in Debay Telategn Gojjam.

== River source ==
The mountain is the source of the Gulla River which becomes the Temcha River and then the Birr River, a major right tributary of the Blue Nile.

== Mountains of the Moon ==
In 1770 Scottish explorer James Bruce identified Mount Amedamit as the legendary Mountains of the Moon the mythical source of the Nile described in ancient Greek and Roman geography. He noted how its ridges form "two semi‑circles like a new moon" around the Little Abbay tributary. Subsequently the Rwenzori range in Uganda became the more favoured candidate.

== See also ==
- Mountains of Kong
