= Bure (Gojjam), Ethiopia =

Bure
- Location in Ethiopia
- Coordinates: 10°42′N 37°4′E
- Country: Ethiopia
- Region: Amhara Region
- Zone: Mirab Gojjam Zone
- Elevation: 2,091 m (6,860 ft)

Population (2005 est.)
  - Total: 23,292
- Time zone: UTC+3 (EAT)

Bure (Amharic: ቡሬ), also transliterated Burye is a town in western Ethiopia. Located in the Mirab Gojjam Zone of the Amhara Region, this town has a longitude and latitude of 10°42′N 37°4′E with an elevation of 2091 meters above sea level.

Bure enjoys a flourishing small business and connection point of businesses between Wolega, Gondar and Shewa. An agricultural training college and Bure Baguna, a mineral water factory, are the main modern industrial opportunities in the town.

== History ==
An early mention of Bure is Emperor Susenyos's visit in 1608, after he had celebrated Easter at Wancha near the Melka Saytant ford over the Abay River.

Ras Mikael Sehul and his puppet Emperor Tekle Haymanot camped at Bure in 1770 for three days. The Enderase (Regent) of the Emperor of Ethiopia, Ras Ali II, was born in Bure while his father Dejazmach Alula was governor of Damot.

Bure is located at a group of hot springs that were popular during the 19th century for their therapeutic properties. When Charles Beke visited Bure in 1842, he reports he found the market "to be very small. It is occasionally visited by a few Gallas from Shinasha and A'muru." Beke continues, "The Baso market is, however, now-a-days so generally frequented by the merchants, that it has drawn away from Burie the trade which I apprehend formerly existed here." By 1880, its market was mentioned as having some trade in gold.

In the late 1930s, during the Italian occupation, Bure was described as a large village with a market located on a ridge between the upper valleys of Fettam/Sarki and Selala. It had two churches, one dedicated to Saint John and the other to Kidane Mihret. It also reportedly had a radio telegraph station, a clinic, and the residence of the local Italian official. Because the town was an important strongpoint on the Bahir Dar-Debre Markos road, its capture by Gideon Force and the followers of Dejazmach Negash Bezibeh 4 March 1941 was a significant contribution to the defeat of the Italians in Ethiopia.

Due to ethnic unrest in the East Welega Zone (located in the Oromia Region) during 2001, over 10,900 Amhara sought refuge in Bure.

== Demographics ==
Based on figures from the Central Statistical Agency in 2005, this town has an estimated total population of 23,292, of whom 11,535 are men and 11,757 are women. The 1994 census reported this town had a total population of 13,437 of whom 6,069 were men and 7,368 were women. It is the largest town in Bure woreda.In 2025 the town population is estimated to be about 70,000.
