= Finote Selam =

Town in Amhara Region, Ethiopia

- Town
- Location in Ethiopia
- Coordinates: 10°42′00″N 37°16′00″E
- Country: Ethiopia
- Region: Amhara
- Zone: Mirab Gojjam
- Elevation: 1,917 m (6,289 ft)

Population (2007)
  - Total: 25,913
  - Estimate (2021): 55,567
- Time zone: UTC+3 (EAT)

Finote Selam (Amharic: ፍኖተ ሰላም) is a town and separate woreda in western Ethiopia. Located in the Mirab Gojjam Zone of the Amhara Region, by road 387 km from Addis Ababa and 176 km from Bahir Dar. By air, the distance from Addis Ababa is 246 km. Finote Selam, the "Pacific Road", is the name given by Emperor Haile Silassie during the Italian invasion on Ethiopia. Formerly its name was Wojet. Now Finote Selam is the capital city of West Gojjam Zone. This town has a longitude and latitude of 10°42′N 37°16′E with an elevation of 1917 meters above sea level.

== History ==
Finote Selam, the "Pacific Road", the name given by Emperor Haile Silassie during the Italian invasion on Ethiopia. Formerly its name was Wojet.

In 1964, a hospital for lepers had been built in Finote Selam by the private fund "Swedish Aid to Leprous Children in Ethiopia". The hospital, Finote Selam Hospital, is a district hospital although it not upgraded to a general hospital. The hospital has a limited resources. In 2019, there was a peaceful demonstration of hospital staff, asking for good governance and that "the hospital shall be general hospital".

On August 25, 2016, during the 2016–2018 Ethiopian state of emergency, residents of Finote Selam demonstrated against the former TPLF-led government. Government forces then shot and killed a college student in the town in an attempt to disperse protesters.

Following the Ethiopian military's recapture of several towns in the Amhara Region during their clashes with Fano, a drone strike carried out by the Ethiopian military killed 26 people on 13 August 2023. The Ethiopian Human Rights Commission (EHRC) announced they received "credible reports of strikes and shelling, including from Debre Birhan, Finote Selam, and Bure, resulting in many civilian casualties and damage to residential areas and public spaces".

== Demographics ==
Based on the 2007 national census conducted by the Central Statistical Agency of Ethiopia (CSA), this town had a total population of 25,913, of whom 13,035 were male and 12,878 female. Most (95.91%) of the inhabitants practice Ethiopian Orthodox Christianity, and 3.34% were Muslim. The 1994 census reported a total population of 13,834.

== Education ==
Notable schools in Finote Selam include Damot Higher and Secondary School and Damot Preparatory school. Colleges in the town include Finote Selam Teachers College and Finote Damot TVET College are frontier.

== Agriculture ==
Finote Selam and the neighbouring woredas are known for production of teff, maize, peppers, beans and chickpeas, fruit and vegetables.

== Tourism ==
Hotels in Finote Selam town include Damot Hotel, and Xtrem Hotel.

== Notable people ==
Prominent people from Finote Selam include scientist Segenet Kelemu and artist Yehunie Belay.
