= West Gojjam Zone =

Zone in Amhara Region of Ethiopia

Coordinates: 11°10′N 37°15′E

West Gojjam ምዕራብ ጎጃም
- Zone
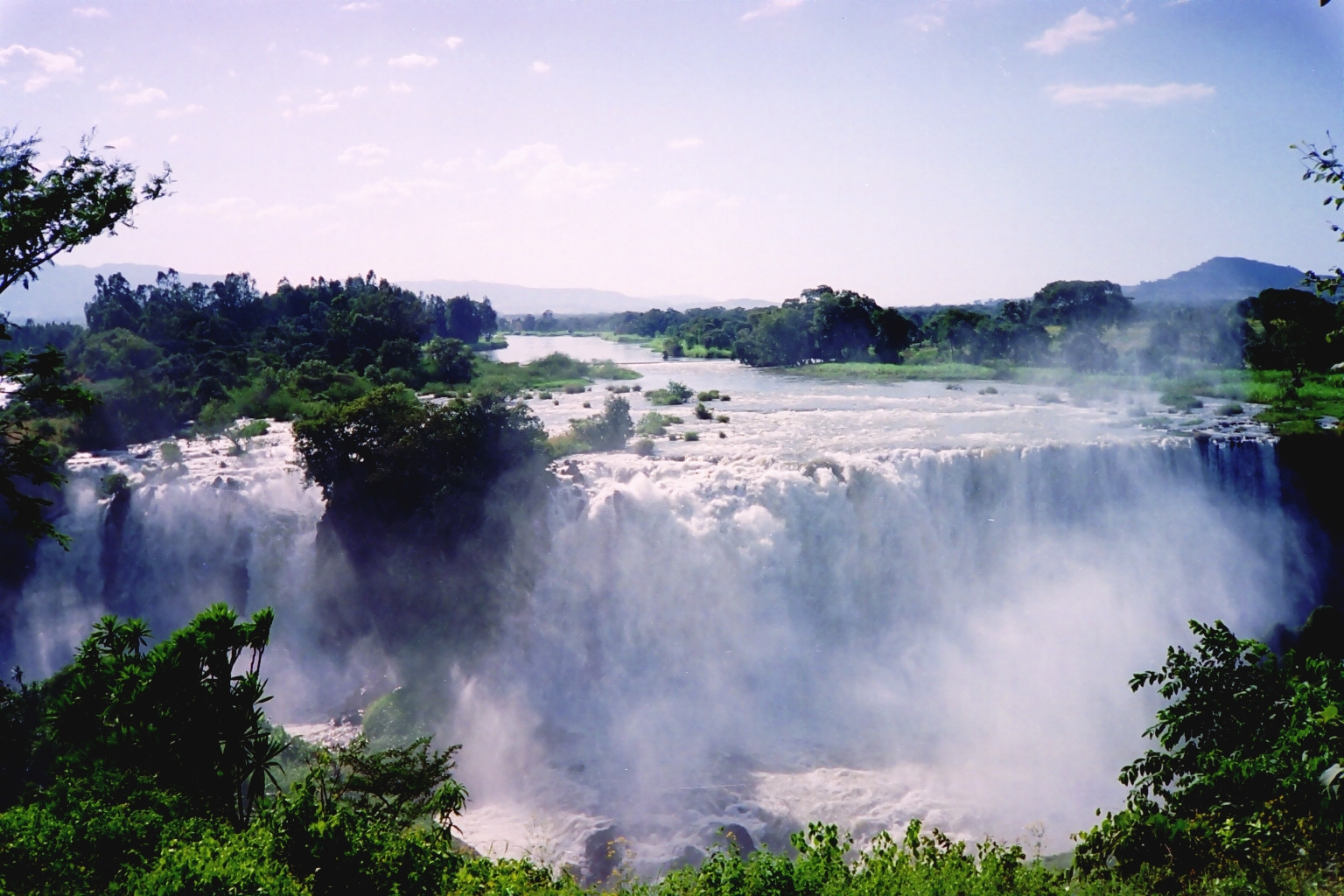

- Flag
- Interactive map of West Gojjam
- Country: Ethiopia
- Region: Amhara
- Largest city: Bahir Dar

Area
  - Total: 13,311.94 km^{2} (5,139.77 sq mi)

Population (2007)
  - Total: 2,106,596
  - Estimate (2012): 2,296,487
  - Density: 158.25/km^{2} (409.86/sq mi)

A map of the regions and zones of Ethiopia

West Gojjam (Amharic: ምዕራብ ጎጃም) or Mirab Gojjam is one of Zones in Amhara Region of Ethiopia. It is named after the former province of Gojjam.

West Gojjam is bordered on the south by the Abay River which separates it from the Oromia Region and Benishangul-Gumuz Region, on the west by Agew Awi, on the north and northwest by North Gondar and also on the north by South Gondar, and on the east by East Gojjam. Its highest point is Mount Amedamit. Towns in West Gojjam include Bahir Dar, Adet, Finote Selam, Bure, Quarit, Dega Damot, Sekela, Merawi, and Dembecha. Finote Selam is the capital of the zone.

== Demographics ==
A 2012 estimate puts the population at 2,296,487. This gives a population density of 172.51 people per square kilometer (446.81 people per square mile), given its area of 13,311.94 square kilometers (5,139.77 square miles).

Based on the 2007 Census conducted by the Central Statistical Agency of Ethiopia (CSA), this Zone has a total population of 2,106,596, of whom 1,058,272 are men and 1,048,324 women; with an area of 13,311.94 square kilometers, West Gojjam has a population density of 158.25. While 184,703 or 8.77% are urban inhabitants, one person was reported to be a pastoralist. A total of 480,255 households were counted in this Zone, which results in an average of 4.39 persons to a household, and 466,491 housing units. The 1994 national census reported a total population for this Zone of 1,779,723 in 374,115 households, of whom 897,215 were men and 882,508 women; 107,238 or 6.03% of its population were urban dwellers at the time.

The largest ethnic group reported in 2007 in West Gojjam was the Amhara (99.42%); all other ethnic groups made up 0.52% of the population. Amharic is spoken as a first language by 99.43%; the remaining 0.57% spoke all other primary languages reported. 98.68% of the population said they practiced Ethiopian Orthodox Christianity, and 1.19% were Muslim. This had remained largely stable from the prior census in 1994. At that time the largest ethnic group reported in West Gojjam was the Amhara (99.43%); all other ethnic groups made up 0.57% of the population. Amharic was spoken as a first language by 99.46%; the remaining 0.54% spoke all other primary languages reported. 98.28% practiced Ethiopian Orthodox Christianity, and 1.59% of the population said they were Muslim.

According to a May 24, 2004 World Bank memorandum, 6% of the inhabitants of West Gojjam have access to electricity, this zone has a road density of 56.7 kilometers per 1000 square kilometers (compared to the national average of 30 kilometers), the average rural household has 1.1 hectare of land (compared to the national average of 1.01 hectare of land and an average of 0.75 for the Amhara Region) and the equivalent of 0.7 heads of livestock. 19.5% of the population is in non-farm related jobs, compared to the national average of 25% and a Regional average of 21%. 61% of all eligible children are enrolled in primary school, and 11% in secondary schools. 40% of the zone is exposed to malaria, and 38% to Tsetse fly. The memorandum gave this zone a drought risk rating of 454.

The Zonal Water Resource Development Office announced 29 July 2009 that it had completed construction of 943 wells and 89 springs in West Gojjam, which will benefit 331,000 people. Using funds from the government, local NGOs and the public, this program improved the rate of access to clean water for inhabitants in the Zone from 39% to 50.6%.
