= List of companies of Ethiopia =

Location of Ethiopia

Ethiopia is a country located in the Horn of Africa. According to the IMF, Ethiopia was one of the fastest-growing economies in the world, registering over 10% economic growth from 2004 through 2009. It was the fastest-growing non-oil-dependent African economy in the years 2007 and 2008. In 2015, the World Bank highlighted that Ethiopia had witnessed rapid economic growth with real domestic product (GDP) growth averaging 10.9% between 2004 and 2014.

== Notable firms ==
This list includes notable companies with primary headquarters located in the country. The industry and sector follow the Industry Classification Benchmark taxonomy. Organizations which have ceased operations are included and noted as defunct.

Notable companies Status: P=Private, S=State; A=Active, D=Defunct
Name	Industry	Sector	Headquarters	Founded	Notes	Status	
Amha Records	Consumer services	Broadcasting & entertainment	Addis Ababa	1969	Record label, defunct 1975	P	D
Anbessa City Bus Service Enterprise	Consumer services	Travel & tourism	Addis Ababa	1945	Passenger transport, bus	P	A
Awash International Bank	Financials	Banks	Addis Ababa	1994	Bank	P	A
BGI Ethiopia PLC	Consumer discretionary	Brewers	Addis Ababa	1998	Brewery and beverage	P	A
Commercial Bank of Ethiopia	Financials	Banks	Addis Ababa	1963	Commercial bank	P	A
Cooperative Bank of Oromia	Financials	Banks	Addis Ababa	2004	Commercial bank	P	A
Dedebit Credit and Saving Institution SC	Financials	Banks	Mek'ele	1997	Microfinance	P	A
Ethiopia Commodity Exchange	Financials	Investment services	Addis Ababa	2008	Exchange	P	A
Ethio-Engineering Group	Heavy industry	Manufacturing	Addis Ababa	2020	State-owned	P	A
Ethiopian Airlines	Consumer services	Airlines	Addis Ababa	1946	Airline	S	A
Ethiopian Electric Power	Utilities	Conventional electricity	Addis Ababa	1956	State-owned power	S	A
Ethiopian Postal Service	Industrials	Delivery services	Addis Ababa	?	Postal services	P	A
Ethio telecom	Telecommunications	Fixed line telecommunications	Addis Ababa	1952	State-owned provider	S	A
Harar Brewery	Consumer goods	Brewers	Harar	1984	Brewery, now part of Heineken International (Netherlands)	P	A
Marathon Motors Engineering	Consumer goods	Automobiles	Addis Ababa	2009	Joint with Hyundai Motor Company (South Korea)	P	A
National Bank of Ethiopia	Financials	Banks	Addis Ababa	1906	Central bank. formerly Bank of Abyssinia	S	A
Oromia International Bank	Financials	Banks	Addis Ababa	2008	Private bank	P	A
Selam Bus Line Share Company	Consumer services	Travel & tourism	Addis Ababa	1996	Passenger transport	P	A
Sky Bus Transport System	Consumer services	Travel & tourism	Addis Ababa	2007	Passenger transport	P	A
Trans Nation Airways	Consumer services	Airlines	Addis Ababa	2004	Charter airline	P	A

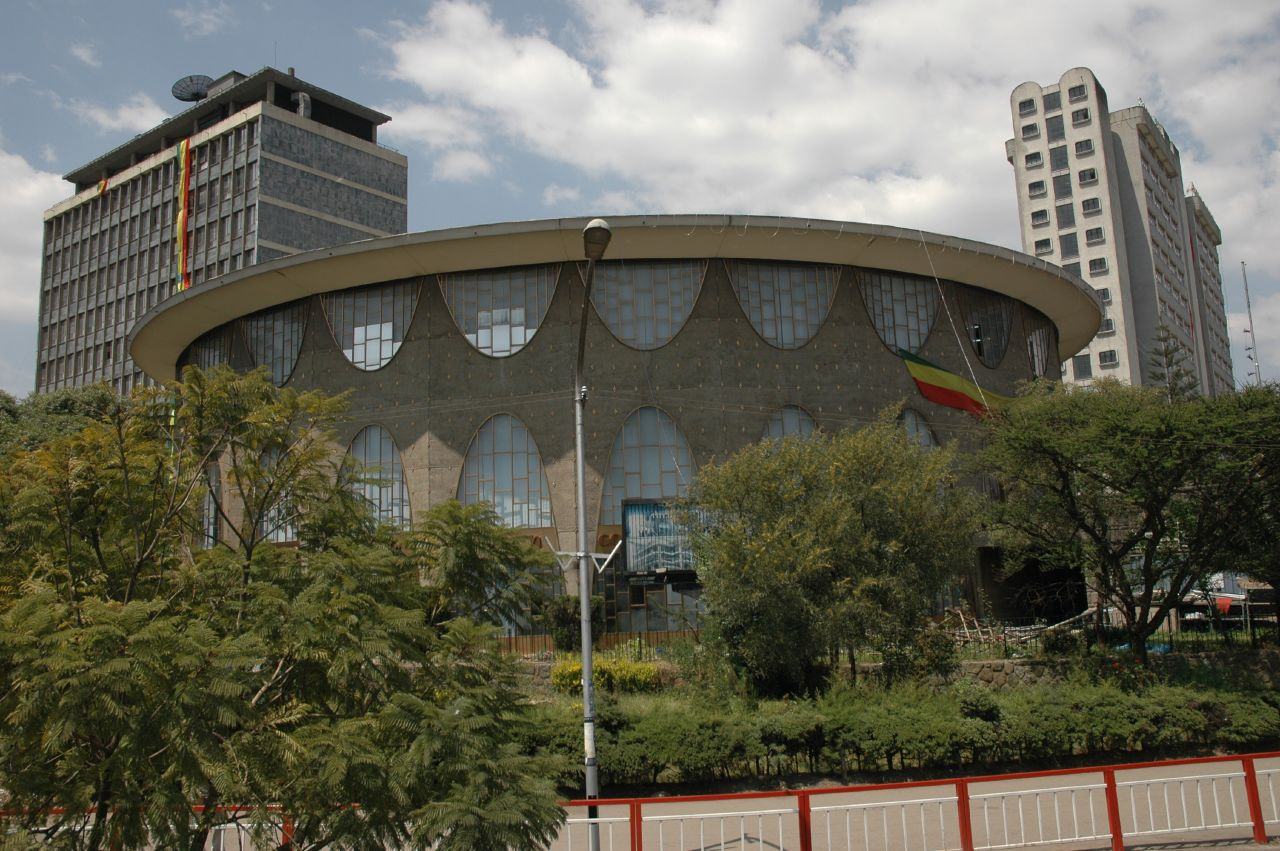
A Commercial Bank of Ethiopia building in Addis Ababa.

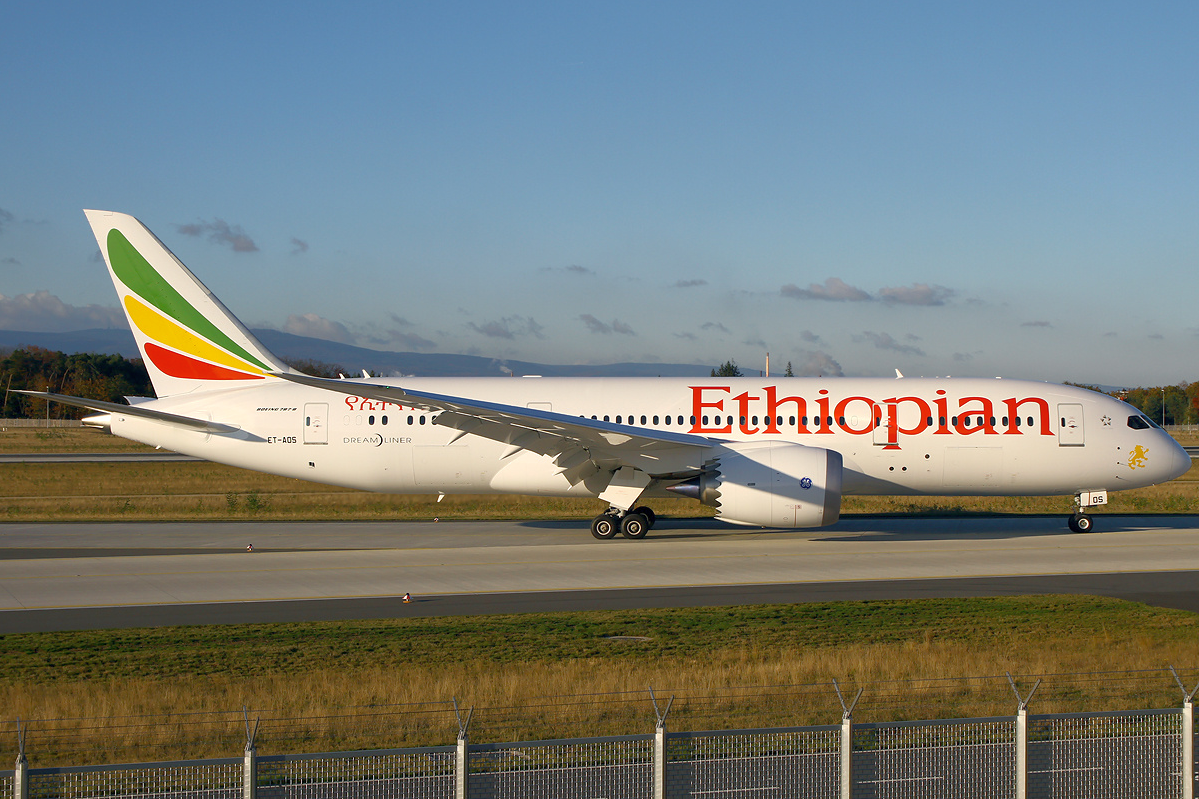
An Ethiopian Airlines Boeing 787 Dreamliner at Frankfurt Airport.

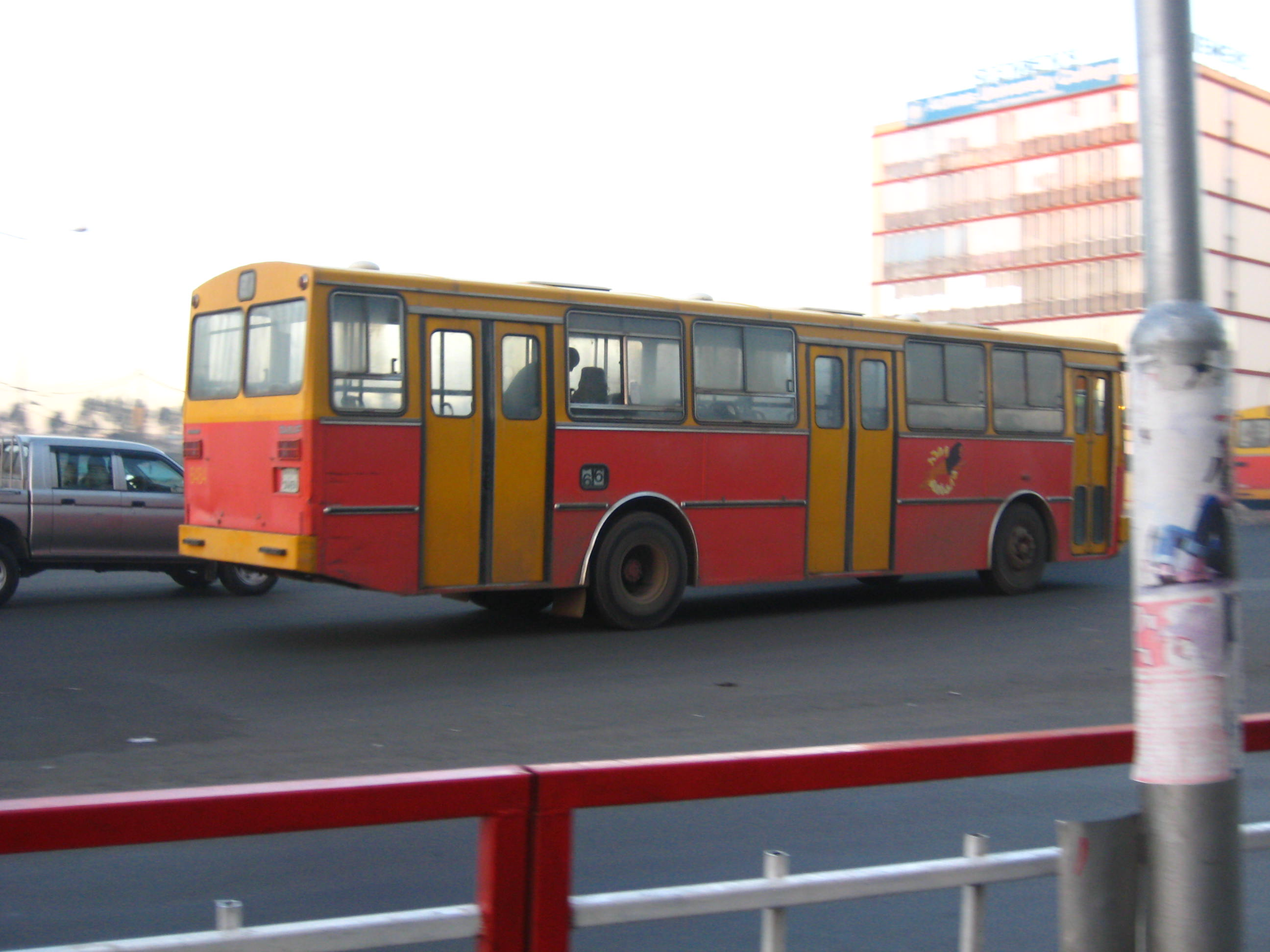
An Anbessa bus at Meskel Square in Addis Ababa.

A Cooperative Bank of Oromia head office in Addis Ababa.

== See also ==
- List of banks in Ethiopia
- Ambo Mineral Water, an Ethiopian bottled water brand that is popular in the country
