= Yohannes Buayalew =

Ethiopian politician

Yohannes Buayalew is an Ethiopian politician who has served as a member of the Amhara Region Council and as a senior official of the Amhara Democratic Party and its successor, the Prosperity Party. He has been held in pre-trial detention since August 2023 as part of a broader crackdown on Amhara politicians, journalists, and activists during the state of emergency declared in the Amhara Region.

== Early political career ==
Yohannes Buayalew served as head of the Amhara Democratic Party (ADP) office in Bahir Dar and was later a member of the executive committee of the Prosperity Party at the regional level. In February 2020, following a leadership reshuffle in the Amhara regional government, he was removed from his position as head of the ADP office and was offered the position of president of the Meles Zenawi Leadership Academy by Prime Minister Abiy Ahmed. He declined the appointment, citing his disagreement with the institution's association with former prime minister Meles Zenawi. He continued to serve as a member of the Amhara Region Council, where he later spoke publicly about the government's handling of political grievances in the region.

== Detention ==
On 4 August 2023, Buayalew was arrested in Addis Ababa along with Christian Tadele, a member of the House of Peoples' Representatives, and Kassa Teshager, a member of the Addis Ababa City Council, shortly after the federal government declared a state of emergency in the Amhara Region. Authorities stated the detainees were suspected of "carrying out various illegal activities" and of providing logistical and financial support to an armed group, understood to refer to the Fano militia.

Buayalew was initially held at the Awash Arba military camp before being transferred to Kaliti Prison in Addis Ababa. He was held for approximately a year and a half without formal charges before prosecutors filed an indictment against him and Christian Tadele in March 2024, under the Criminal Code and the Anti-Terrorism Proclamation; more than 50 other individuals were named in the same case file. Defense lawyers submitted a 12-page counterclaim to the court in May 2024.

According to relatives, Buayalew underwent surgery in detention in December 2024 and experienced continued bleeding afterward; family members said he and Tadele were returned to prison hours after the procedure without adequate follow-up care. The Ethiopian Human Rights Commission visited detainees held under the same case in September 2023 at a facility in the Afar Region, where detainees reported having experienced ethnic slurs and harassment during their transfer.

Human Rights Watch's 2025 World Report listed Buayalew among Amhara journalists and opposition politicians detained since August 2023 who remained in detention without trial as of the report's publication.

== See also ==
- Christian Tadele
- Fano (militia)
- Amhara Region
