= Dessalegn Chanie =

Ethiopian politician (born 1981)

- ደሳለኝ ጫኔ

Member of the House of Peoples' Representatives
- Incumbent
- Assumed office 21 June 2021
- Constituency: Bahir Dar

Chairman of the National Movement of Amhara
- In office 19 June 2018 – 24 February 2020
- Prime Minister: Abiy Ahmed
- Preceded by: position established
- Succeeded by: Belete Molla

Personal details
- Born: Dessalegn Chanie Dagnew; 11 February 1981 (age 45) Merawi, Bahir Dar, Ethiopia
- Citizenship: Ethiopian
- Education: Bahir Dar Institute of Technology (PhD); Bahir Dar University (MS)

Dessalegn Chanie (Amharic: ደሳለኝ ጫኔ, born 1981) is an Ethiopian politician who is currently MP in the House of Peoples' Representatives (HoPR) since 2021. He was the founder of the Amhara nationalist party, the National Movement of Amhara (NaMA) in 2018 along with Christian Tadele and Belete Molla. He has served as a chairman until 2020. Known for his political argument and asking direct question without fear.

== Early life and education ==
Dessalegn was born on February 11, 1983, in Merawi, near Bahir Dar, Ethiopia. He completed his elementary and high school education in Merawi before pursuing higher education at Bahir Dar University. He holds a PhD in integrated water resource management from the Bahir Dar Institute of Technology and a joint master's degree in watershed management from Cornell University and Bahir Dar University. Dessalegn is currently an associate professor of hydrology and water management at the Institute of Disaster Risk Management and Food Security Studies at Bahir Dar University. In addition, he holds undergraduate degrees in economics and history/geography.

== Political career ==
In June 2018, Dessalegn co-founded National Movement of Amhara (NaMA), an Amhara nationalist political party along with Christian Tadele, Belete Molla, and many others. He has been served as the chairman of the party until succeeded with Molla in February 2020. The 1st General Congress of Central Committee of NaMA took place from 22–23 February while the National Election Board of Ethiopia (NEBE) has been observer.

Currently, Dessalegn is a member of Ethiopian Parliament representing Bahir Dar. During the 2021 general election, Desalegn – representing NaMA – has voted Tana 2 Polling Station in Bahir Dar city. On 31 January 2024, he was arrested by government's security force in Addis Ababa with no valid reason. He is an outspoken critic of Abiy Ahmed and known for delivering outright speech directed toward Abiy at meetings of the People’s Representatives Council.
