= Merawi, Ethiopia =

City in Amhara Region, Ethiopia

Merawi መርዓዊ (in Amharic) Mer'Awi
- City
- Location within Ethiopia
- Coordinates: 11°24′31″N 37°9′39″E
- Country: Ethiopia
- Region: Amhara
- Woreda: West Gojjam
- Towns of West Gojjam: Merawi

Area
  - Total: 19 km^{2} (7.3 sq mi)
- Elevation: 1,901 m (6,237 ft)

Population (2021(est.))
  - Total: 40,094
  - Density: 2,100/km^{2} (5,500/sq mi)
- Time zone: UTC+3 (EAT)
- Area code: (+251) 58 330

Merawi (Amharic: መርዓዊ) is a city located 30 kilometers south of Bahir Dar, Amhara Region's capital in north-western Ethiopia, in what was previously Bahir Dar Awraja of Gojjam province. The town also hosts the seat of North Mecha Woreda administration.

== Geography ==
Merawi is situated about 30 kilometers south of Bahir Dar and approximately c.525 km from Addis Ababa, Ethiopia's capital. Specifically, the town is located c.7 km near Koga Dam, lying on latitude and longitude coordinates of 11°24′31″N 37°9′39″E with an elevation of 1901 meters above sea level.

== History ==
Merawi in its modern form is said to be founded in early 1940s by Dejazmach Abere Yimam, then governor of Gojjam and his younger brother Fitawrari Admasu Yimam. Fitawrari Admasu was the first administrator of Merawi. The Yimam brothers, together with other iconic patriots such as Belay Zeleke, defended Gojjam from Italians and were recognized as national heroes.

The town is also known to be the birthplace of prominent politicians and national heroes such as Colonel Tadesse Muluneh, a former airforce pilot for Ethiopian National Defence Forces renowned for his bravery during the Ogaden War, later turned politician as the Co-founder and first chairman of Ethiopian Patriotic Front; Zemene Kassie of Amhara Popular Forces (Fano); Dessalegn Chanie (PhD), first chairman of National Movement for Amhara (NaMA) & Member of Ethiopian Parliament, Fasil Yene'alem of ESAT & EMS; Tazebew Assefa of EPRP and Amhara Democratic Force Movement; and Captain Memar Getnet of Amhara Special Forces.

== Demographics ==
Like any other parts of the country, Merawi has shown a steady increase in its population in the last decade. Based on Central Statistical Agency of Ethiopia (CSA)'s 2021 projection, Merawi is estimated to have a total population of 40,094, of whom 21,312 are male and 18,782 are female.

The 2005 Census, conducted by CSA., documented that the town had a total population of 22,676, of whom 11,432 are men and 11,244 women. The town is also a seat of one of the most populous Woreda in Amhara region, Mecha Woreda, having a total population of 292,250 in 2005 Census (and estimated to 340,289 in 2015). Majority of the inhabitants (98.91%) practiced Ethiopian Orthodox Christianity.

The 1994 national census reported a total population of 12,278. The largest ethnic group reported in Merawi was the Amhara (99.91%). Amharic was spoken as a first language by 99.96%. The majority of the inhabitants practiced Ethiopian Orthodox Christianity, with 98.84% reporting that as their religion, while 1.09% were Muslim.

== Economy ==
After decades of slow development, the town has developed in the past ten years. However, its economy remains largely driven by small-scale merchandise trade, service, agriculture, and cottage enterprises. A significant portion of its populace still depends on the production and sale of traditional alcoholic beverages known as "Tella" and "Arekie" for their livelihoods. Merawi's traditional "Arekie" is distributed in the northwestern regions of Ethiopia, including Bahir Dar, Gondar, Humera, and Metema, and in neighboring Sudan. The town has a large timber market, largely eucalyptus tree, which could support a pulp and paper industry.

The town hosts the headquarters of Koga Integrated Irrigation Dam project which currently serves more than 10,000 smallholder farm households. As the hub of Koga Integrated Irrigation Dam project, the town and its neighboring villages benefit from marketing surplus production. As per the strategic plan of the regional government, the area is hailed as one of the primary food hubs within the region. Alongside flourishing horticultural output, there has been a remarkable surge in aquaculture production and marketing, particularly at the man-made Koga Dam. Anticipated to attract tourists for excursions in the near future, the dam adds to the area's economic potential. Furthermore, financial and business activities thrive with the presence of branches from various banks and financial institutions, such as Commercial Bank of Ethiopia and Buna International Bank.

== Education and Health ==
The town has one of the oldest elementary schools in the region, Merawi elementary school, which was founded in 1948. It also has an additional public elementary school, two comprehensive high schools and one public Technic and Vocational College. A recently established Koga health science college is stationed in the town. The town's proximity to the regional capital, Bahir Dar, has helped secure some of the finest teachers in the region, which is evident in the successful achievement of its students in higher studies in the region. Bahir Dar University's extension programs are quite popular in the town.

The town has a few number of private and public health clinics, one public health center and one public hospital.

== Transportation ==
The town enjoys Minibuses almost every next half hour to Bahir Dar. For a safe travel from Addis Ababa to Merawi, one could take Ethiopian Airlines which operates thrice daily flights to Bahir Dar and take 30 minutes drive to Merawi. It is also common to take a relatively cheaper Intercity bus services to Addis Ababa run by private companies such as Selam Bus Line Share Company and Sky Bus Transport System which operate daily from Bahir Dar to Addis Ababa as the town lies on the main road connecting the two cities. Besides, the town has almost hourly bus travel services to nearby rural towns of Mecha Woreda such as Wetet Abay and Birakat. The road to Birakat extends to Adet although with limited access. Cycling is the most common and convenient way of traveling within the town. Lately, Tricycle has also become a popular means of transportation.

== Merawi Massacre ==
On January 29, 2024, soldiers belonging to Abiy Ahmed's Prosperity Army predominantly comprising Oromia special forces conducted house-in-house summary execution of more than 100 civilians in Merawi town, purportedly in revenge for a military loss to Fano.
