= Asrat =

Asrat is a name. Notable people with the name include:

- Asrat Atsedeweyn, Ethiopian statistician
- Asrat Desta (died 1977), Ethiopian soldier
- Asrat Haile, Ethiopian football manager
- Asrat Megersa (born 1987), Ethiopian footballer
- Asrat Tera, Ethiopian politician
- Asrat Tunjo (born 1996), Ethiopian footballer
- Asrat Woldeyes (1928–1999), Ethiopian surgeon
- Amanuel Asrat (born 1971), Eritrean poet
- Gebru Asrat, Ethiopian politician
