= National Movement of Amhara =

Political party in Ethiopia

National Movement of Amhara የአማራ ብሔራዊ ንቅናቄ
- Abbreviation: NaMA
- Leader: Belete Molla
- Founder: Desalagne Chanie
- Founded: 10 June 2018
- Ideology: Amhara nationalism; Ethnic nationalism; Liberalism (self-proclaimed)
- Political position: Right-wing
- Seats in House of Peoples' Representatives: 6 / 547

The National Movement of Amhara (Amharic: የአማራ ብሔራዊ ንቅናቄ, romanized: Ye’āmara Biḥērawī Nik’inak’ē, NaMA) is a right-wing Amhara ethnic nationalist political party created in June 2018 in Bahir Dar, capital of the Amhara Region of Ethiopia.

== Creation ==
NAMA was created in June 2018 in Bahir Dar to defend the interests of Amhara people in Ethiopia, after Abiy Ahmed became prime minister of Ethiopia and promised the "broadening [of] democratic space".

== Leadership and structure ==
Desalagne Chanie (or Chane) was elected as the chair of NaMA at its creation in June 2018. He was replaced by Belete Molla, who was elected as chair in February 2020 in a meeting that included observers from the National Election Board of Ethiopia (NEBE).

As of February 2020, NaMA was led by a nine-member executive committee, including Belete as chair. One of the executive committee members, Christian Tadele, was at the time under arrest as a suspect in the Amhara Region coup d'état attempt of June 2019.

== Political positions ==
=== June 2019 Amhara Region coup d'état attempt ===
In December 2019, NaMA called for the release of its leaders who had been arrested for suspicion of involvement in the June 2019 Amhara Region coup d'état attempt. NaMA stated that the detainees had not been interrogated in relation to the killings that occurred during the attempted coup d'état. NaMA stated that it wants "the real culprits" of the event to be "held accountable".

=== Massacres ===
In October 2020, NaMA criticised the federal government for killings of ethnic Amharas in Oromia Region, Benishangul-Gumuz Region and Southern Nations, Nationalities, and Peoples' Region. NaMA accused the federal government of "demeaning the attacks, hiding evidence and in frequent cases blaming the victims" and regional government officials of failing to stop the attacks and of supporting the perpetrators.
