= Christian Tadele =

Ethiopian politician and member of parliament

- ክርስቲያን ታደለ

Member of the House of Peoples' Representatives
- Incumbent
- Assumed office 2022

Spokesperson and Head of Political Affairs of National Movement of Amhara
- Incumbent
- Assumed office 16 June 2018

Personal details
- Born: Mengistu Tadele Tsegaye Quarit District, Ethiopia
- Citizenship: Ethiopian
- Party: National Movement of Amhara
- Spouse: Nardos Adissie
- Education: University of Gondar (BA); Addis Ababa University (MPH); Bahir Dar University (Ph.D candidate in Public Health])

Christian Tadele (Amharic: ክርስቲያን ታደለ) is an Ethiopian politician who is a member of the House of Peoples' Representatives (HoPR) in Opposition group, Chair Person of the Opposition Caucus and Chairman of the Standing Committee on Government Expenditure. He was the spokesperson and Political Affairs Chief of the Amhara nationalist party National Movement of Amhara (NaMa) from 2018.

Tadele is well-known for his sensational oratory skills and has been arrested several times by the government security forces as he was an outspoken opposition leader to Abiy Ahmed administration.

== Education ==
Christian studied in Finote Selam secondary school. He took BA degree in Sociology from University of Gondar, MPH from Addis Ababa University. He was PhD candidate in Public Health at Bahir Dar University before his current imprisonment.

== The 2014 Voluntary Ebola Mission in West Africa ==
In 2014, Christian was among approximately 200 Ethiopian health professionals who volunteered to assist Ebola-affected countries in Liberia.

== Political career ==
Alongside Dessalegn Chanie, Christian Tadele was one of co-founding members of the National Movement of Amhara (NaMa), where he has served as the spokesperson and Political Affairs Chief since June 16, 2018.

He is one of opposition MPs who is utterly critical for the Abiy Ahmed government and arrested several times during his regime. In June 2019, three Executive members of NaMa, including Tadele were arrested in West Gojjam Zone, Sekela woreda following the Amhara Region coup d'état attempt on 22 June. They were arrested where they travelling for work.

In June 2023, he condemned the brutal killings in Debre Elias monastery, in Gojjam Zone of Amhara Region, alleging it was perpetuated by government security forces. On 3 August 2023, Tadele was taken away by security forces amidst a state of emergency imposed during the war in Amhara. A family member told that a policeman beat him before proceeding talk to him. In the next day at around 8:30 AM, police returned to Tadele's home to conduct search.

In March 2024, the Parliament lifted his immunity. Two members of parliament opposed the motion to lift his immunity.
