= Belete =

Belete (Amharic: በለጠ) is an Ethiopian surname. Notable people with the surname include:

- Almensh Belete, (born 1989) Ethiopian-born Belgian long-distance runner
- Mimi Belete, (born 1988) Ethiopian born Baharani long-distance runner
- Meseret Belete, (born 1999) long-distance runner
- Belete Molla, Ethiopian politician
