= Shitaye =

Shitaye is an Ethiopian given name. Notable people with the name include:

- Shitaye Alemu, Ethiopian physician and academic
- Shitaye Eshete (born 1990), Ethiopian-born Bahraini long-distance runner
- Shitaye Gemechu (born 1980), Ethiopian long-distance runner
