= Asrat Atsedeweyn =

Ethiopian statistician, academic administrator, and politician

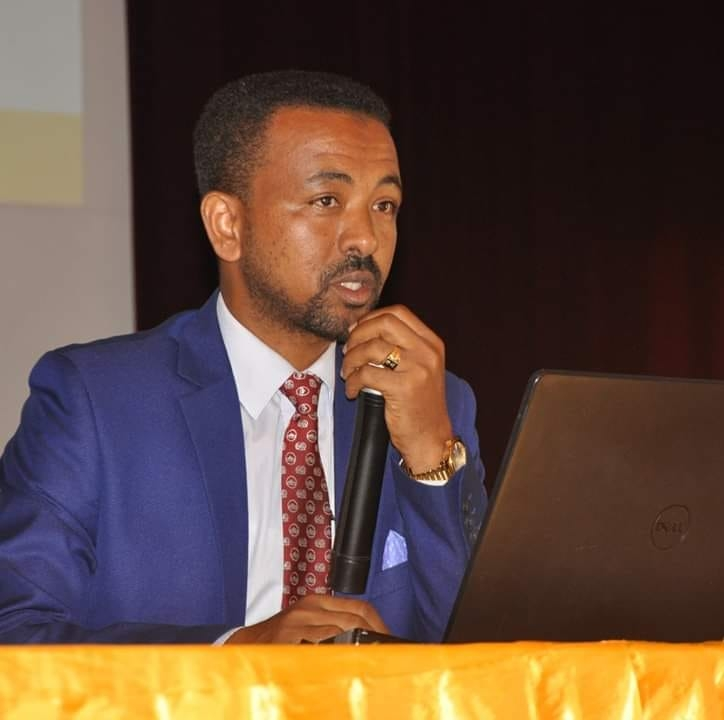

Member of the House of Peoples Representatives (Amhara Region) State Assembly from the
- President: University of Gondar
- Parliamentary group: House of Peoples and Representatives Amhara Region

Personal details
- Born: Gondar, Ethiopia
- Education: Associate Professor of Biostatistics; Department of Epidemiology and Biostatistics; College of Medicine and Health Sciences; University of Gondar
- Alma mater: Bahir Dar University; Addis Ababa University; Andhra University
- Profession: Statistician

Asrat Atsedeweyn is an Ethiopian statistician, academic administrator, servant leader and politician currently serving as president of University of Gondar, Ethiopia. He was previously Academic Vice President of the University of Gondar. He also holds Government office as a Representative of the House of Peoples in one of 10 regions of Ethiopia.

== Early life and education ==
Asrat Atsedeweyn was born in Gondar, northwestern Ethiopia. He completed a BEd. in Mathematics at Bahir Dar University (2001), earned a MSc. in statistics from Addis Ababa University (2008), and PhD. in statistics (2014) from Andrha University India.

== Career ==
Atsedeweyn joined the faculty of the University of Gondar (UoG) in 2008 as a lecturer and in February 2009 he became the head of the Department of Statistics. He served as dean of the College of Natural and Computational Sciences from October 2009 until September 2011. After the stint as dean, he held the position of Research and Publication Director for nine months and then he became Academic Vice President of the university from February 2016 through April 2019. Atsedeweyn assumed the presidency of the university in May 2019, succeeding former President Desalegn Mengesha.

On 11 July 2021 he ran for a parliamentary seat in the Amhara State House of Peoples and Representatives and won a seat in the state legislature. He currently represents the Simada district which is found in the Southern Gondar Zone in the Amhara Region where he is a State Representative.

Atsedeweyn has published articles in the field of statistics.

== Awards and honors ==
Atsedeweyn was elected an Executive Committee member of the Global One Health Initiative, Cash Ambassador, University of Gondar Comprehensive Specialized Hospital, lifetime member of Family Guidance Association of Ethiopia, lifetime member of the Indian Journal of Probability and Statistics, member of the American Statistics Association, member of the Ethiopian Statistical Association, member Ethiopian Economic Association and board member of the Gondar College of Teachers Education.

== University leadership ==
In his time as president of the University of Gondar Asrat Atsedeweyn has been able to work on a number of societal problem solving initiatives. In his short time as president he has been able to focus on inclusive issues when it comes to people with disabilities and also been able to further the aims of the university by helping those who are most vulnerable.

Asrat has also been a representative and brand ambassador in various university leadership roles by bringing much partnerships and collaborations not only for the university and the country as a whole.
