= Belete Molla =

Ethiopian politician

- በለጠ ሞላ
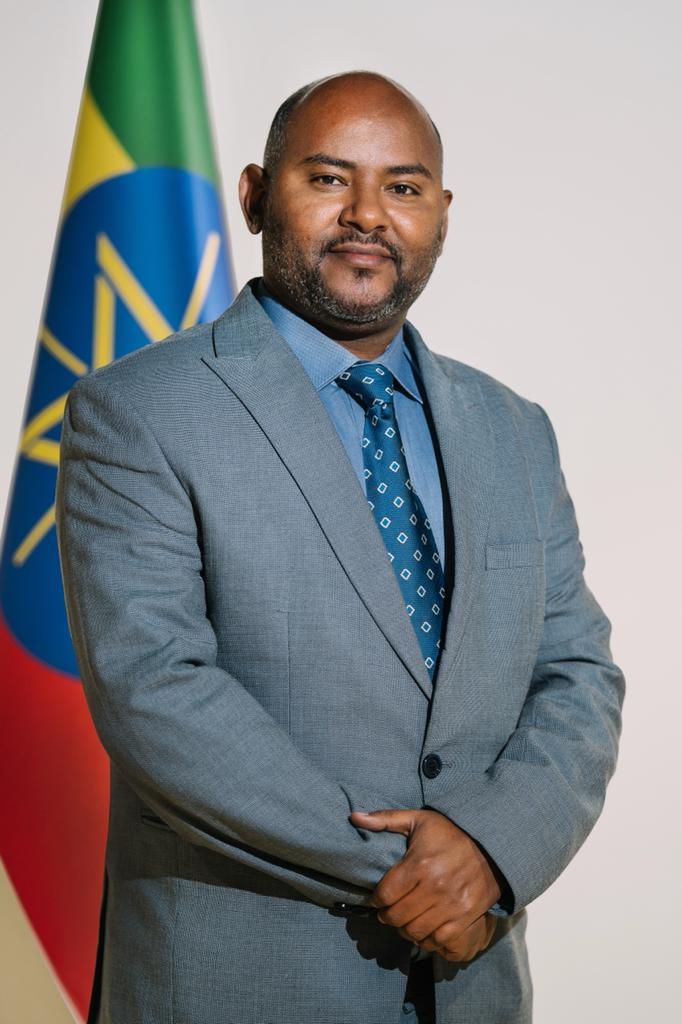
- Official portrait, 2025

Minister of Innovation and Technology
- Incumbent
- Assumed office 6 October 2021
- President: Sahle-Work Zewde; Taye Atske Selassie
- Prime Minister: Abiy Ahmed
- Preceded by: Abraham Belay

Chairman of the National Movement of Amhara
- Incumbent
- Assumed office 24 February 2020
- Preceded by: Desalagne Chanie

Personal details
- Party: National Movement of Amhara
- Education: Addis Ababa University (PhD)
- Awards: Erasmus Mundus Scholarship Award (2007)

Belete Molla Getahun (Amharic: በለጠ ሞላ) is an Ethiopian politician who was appointed Minister of Innovation and Technology in 2021, and founder and chairman of the National Movement of Amhara (NaMA), a right-wing Amhara nationalist political party in Ethiopia.

== Education ==
Belete attended Kobbo Elementary and Senior Secondary School, he furthered his education to obtained a B.A Degree in Philosophy at Addis Ababa University, he later a M.A in Applied Ethics (Erasmus Mundus) jointly from the Norwegian University of Science and Linköping University (Sweden) and a M.A in Philosophy from Addis Ababa University, Belete has received PhD in philosophy from Addis Ababa University. During his academic years, he published several articles and books related on ethics, political economy, intercultural philosophy, hermeneutics and African philosophy. In 2007, Belete was a recipient of the Erasmus Mundus Scholarship Award.

== Career ==
=== Academic career ===
Belete joined the Department of Philosophy at Addis Ababa University in 2005. He coordinated the department's postgraduate programmes from September 2013 to December 2014 and was later appointed as chairperson of the department in 2015.

=== Political career ===
On 10 June 2018, Belete founded the Amhara nationalist political party the National Movement of Amhara (NaMA) in Bahir Dar along with Desalegn Chanie. In February 2020, NaMA Central Committee elected Belete as a chairman while replacing Desalegn. In 2021 general election, NaMA won 5 seats in the House of Peoples' Representatives (HoPR). On 6 October 2021, he was elected as the Minister of Innovation and Technology.

== Journal Articles ==
- Rise and Fall of Essentialist Social Theories: Recapitulation and Critique.” Published in Ethiopian Journal of the Social Sciences and Humanities/African Journal Online
- Beyond Cartesian Philosophy of Essentialism, and the Quest for Intercultural Discourse: Some Examples.” Published in Ethiopian Journal of the Social Sciences and Humanities/African Journal Online

== Recognition ==
- Erasmus Mundus Scholarship Award from the European Union, 2007
- Highlighted as "Minister of the Week" in African Public sector magazine (2022)
