= Blue Nile Falls =

Waterfall in Amhara, Ethiopia

Coordinates: 11.4905°N 37.5878°E

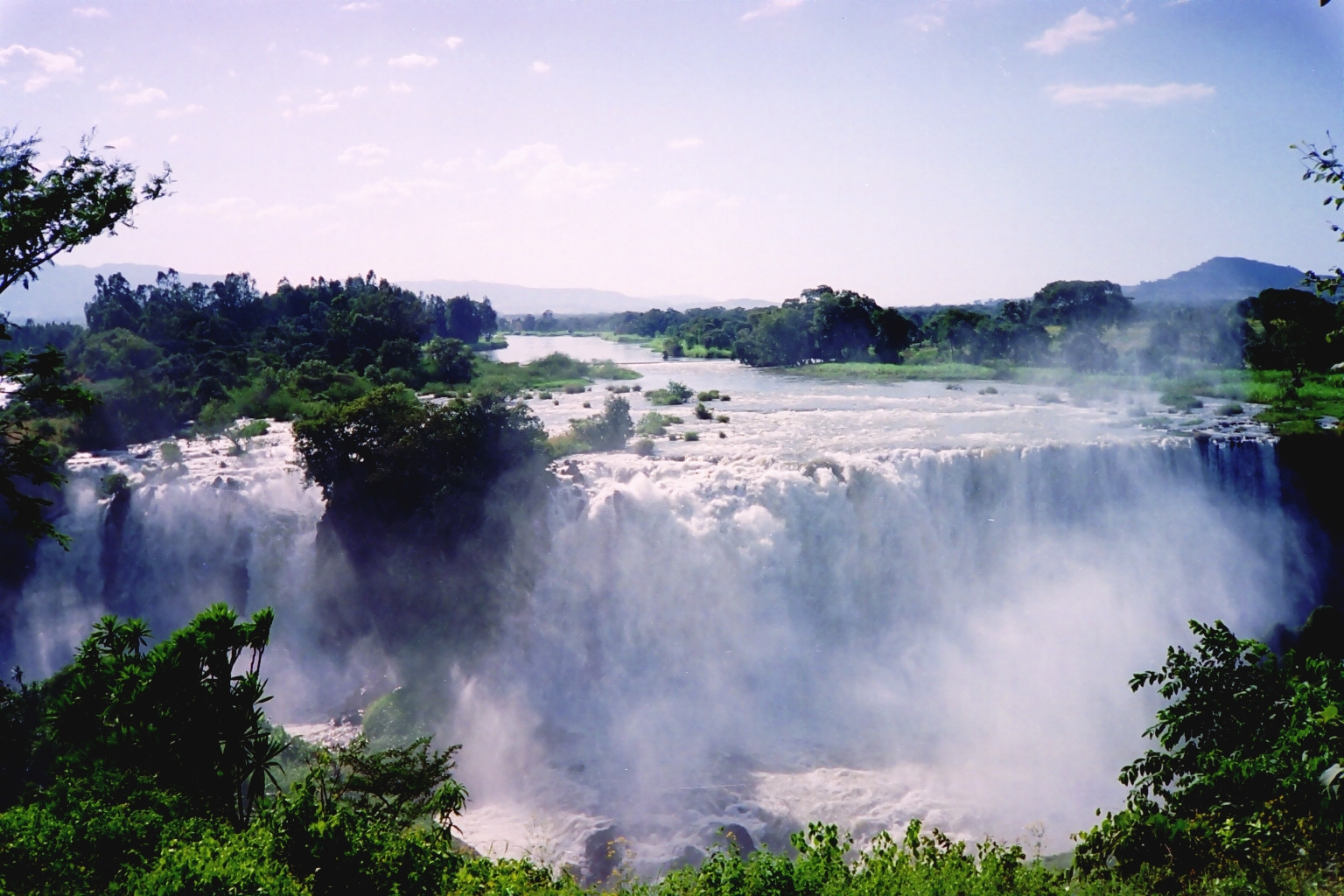
Blue Nile Falls

The Blue Nile Falls is a waterfall on the Blue Nile river in South Gondar, Amhara Region, Ethiopia. It is known as Tis Abay in Amharic, meaning 'great smoke'. It is situated on the upper course of the river, about 30 kilometres (19 miles) downstream from the town of Bahir Dar and Lake Tana. The falls are one of Ethiopia's best-known tourist attractions.

The falls are 42 metres (138 ft) high, consisting of four streams that vary from a trickle in the dry season to over 400 metres (1,300 ft) wide in the rainy season. Regulation of Lake Tana now reduces the variation somewhat, and since 2003 a hydro-electric station has taken much of the flow out of the falls except during the rainy season. The Blue Nile Falls isolate the ecology of Lake Tana from the ecology of the rest of the Nile, and this isolation has played a role in the evolution of the endemic fauna of the lake.

A short distance downstream from the falls sits the first stone bridge constructed in Ethiopia, built at the command of Emperor Susenyos in 1626. According to Manuel de Almeida, stone for making lime had been found nearby along the Blue Nile tributary Alata, and a craftsman who had come from India with Afonso Mendes, the Catholic Patriarch of Ethiopia, supervised the construction.

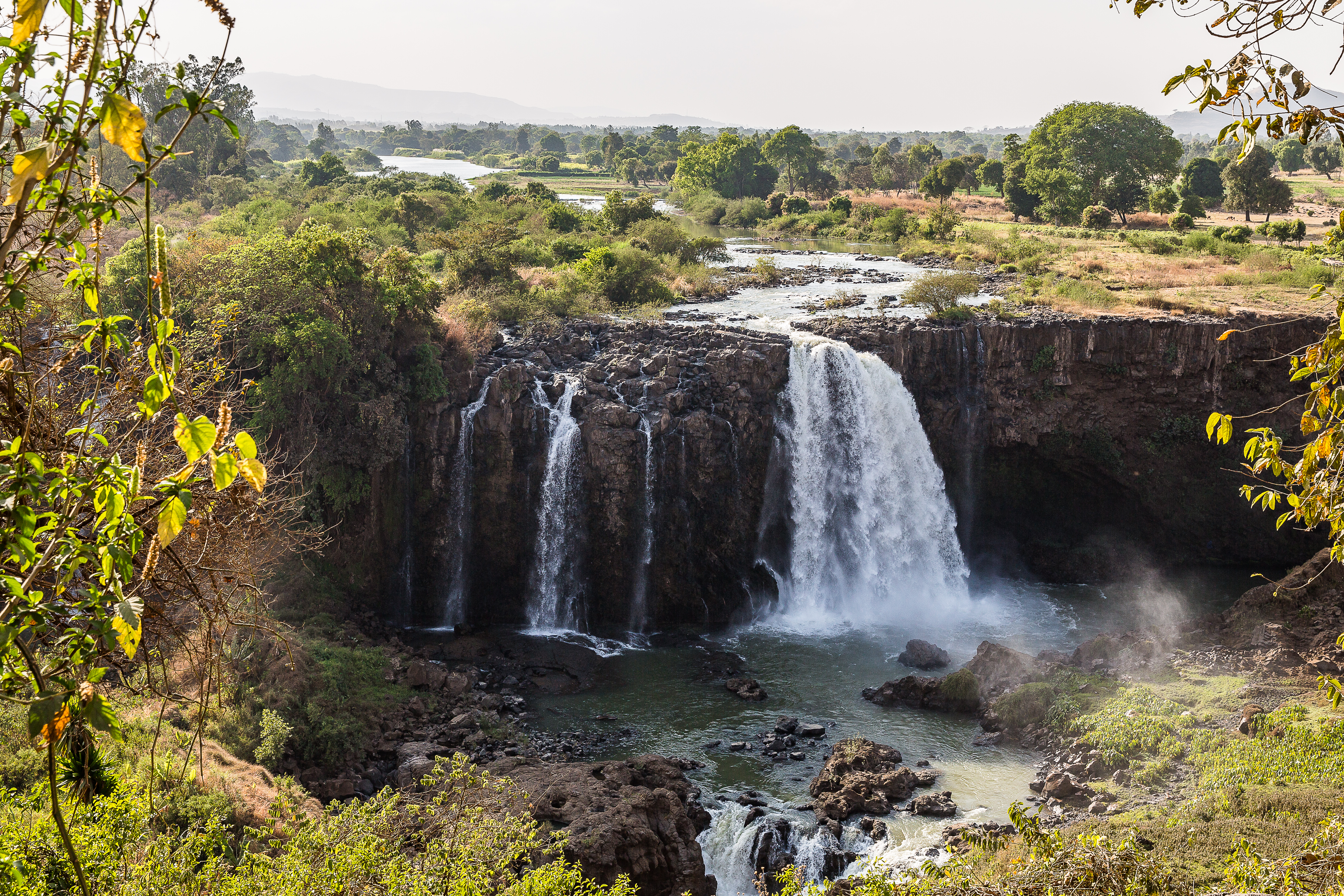
Blue Nile falls in 2018 dry season

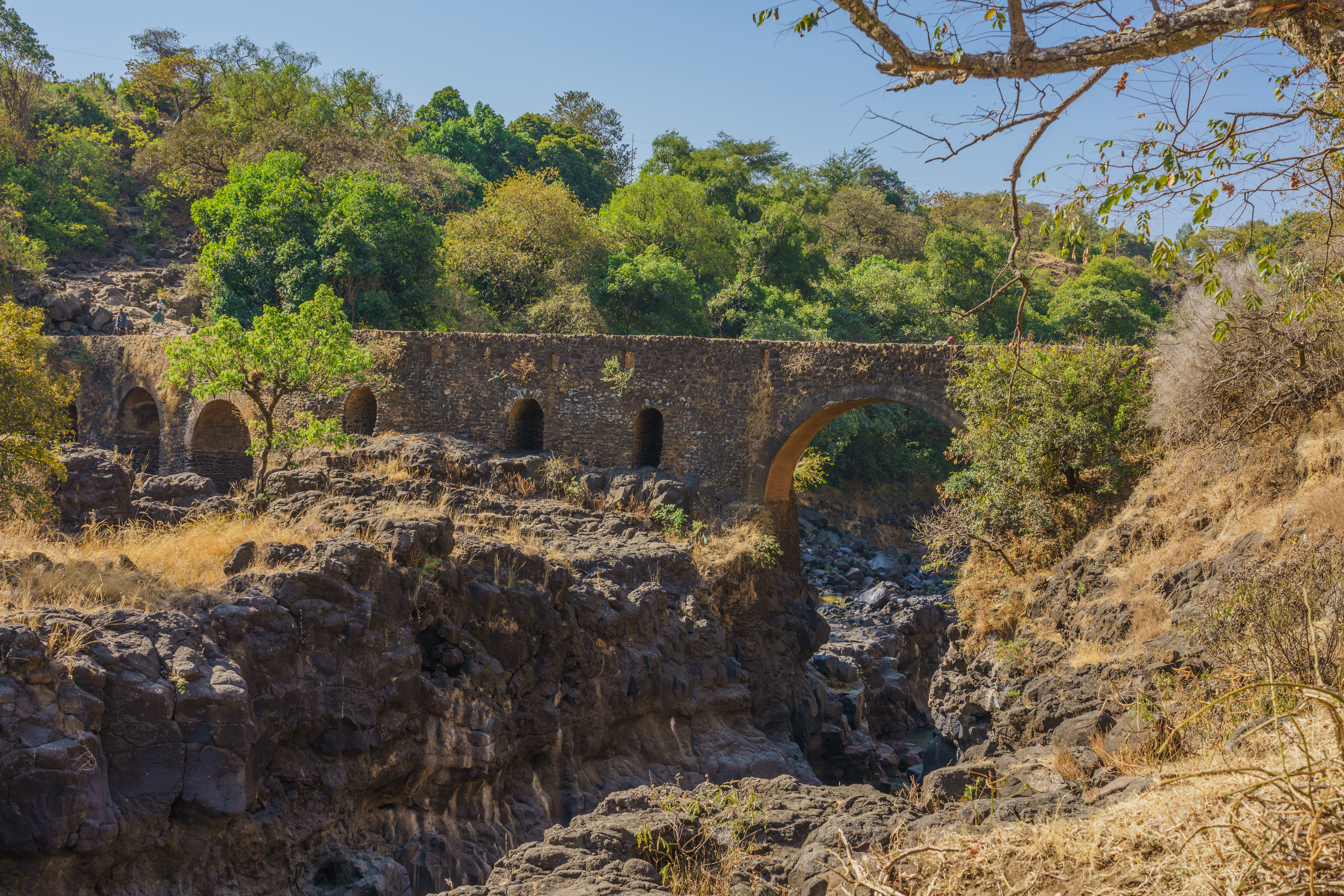
Stone bridge over the Nile

== See also ==
- List of waterfalls
