= Shitaye Alemu =

Ethiopian physician and academic

Shitaye Alemu Balcha is an Ethiopian physician and academic, "a venerated local internist who pioneered diabetes care in northern Ethiopia". An expert in non-communicable diseases, she has published on diabetes, epilepsy and HIV/AIDS in rural Ethiopia. She is Professor of Internal Medicine in the College of Medicine and Health Sciences at the University of Gondar.

== Life ==
Shitaye Alemu gained her Doctor of Medicine degree from Addis Ababa University in 1982, and a speciality certificate in internal medicine in 1988. She began her teaching career at the University of Gondar in 1984. In January 2001 she became chair of the university's Anti-HIV/AIDS project. In May 2019 she was promoted to full professorship.
