= Ambo Mineral Water =

Mineral water brand

- Type: Bottled water
- Inception: 1930; 96 years ago
- Manufacturer: Ambo Mineral Water S.C.
- Available: Ethiopia, Kenya, Somalia, South Africa, Sudan, Saudi Arabia, United Arab Emirates, England, Sweden, United States and Toronto, Canada
- Website: ambomineralwater.com

Ambo Mineral Water is a brand of naturally-carbonated bottled mineral water, sourced from the springs in Ambo Senkele, near the town of Ambo in central Ethiopia. It is a popular drink in Ethiopia, and has been described as the "oldest modern mineral water" and Ethiopia's "oldest mineral water bottler." It has been bottled since 1930. Since 2017, the company Ambo Mineral Water S.C. is owned by Coca-Cola Beverages Africa.

== History ==
Ambo Mineral Water has been bottled since 1930. The last emperor of Ethiopia used to travel here to drink the water, which has been described as "holy water" by local residents per its prized status for having alleged restorative properties. Local residents have stated that the water can improve digestion, be used as to ease rheumatism and can cure ailments of the stomach. Generations ago, local farmers noticed lost cattle drinking the water.

== Source ==
Ambo Mineral Water has been in business since 1930 and is sourced from a thermal mineral spring that has significant amounts of "natural calcium, magnesium, potassium, bicarbonates and carbon dioxide". The water is naturally carbonated by the carbon dioxide at the source. The water is derived from a volcanic fissure, from which it runs down a stream in a montane environment, and is collected in Ambo Senkele, Ethiopia. Ambo Senkele is approximately 130 kilometers from Addis Ababa.

== Today ==
The company was purchased by SABMiller in 2009. In 2011, SABMiller invested around US$20 million modernizing the bottling plant and operations. After these improvements, the plant produced 40,000 glass bottles hourly. Previous output was approximately 12,000 bottles per hour. In November 2014, Ambo Mineral Water was jointly purchased by SABMiller PLC and SouthWest Development, with plans to join Coca-Cola as SABMiller. During this time, it was announced that Coca-Cola Company and Coca-Cola Sabco were going to form a new company named Coca-Cola Beverages Africa. According to Ambo's web site, it was purchased by CCBA in 2017. In a 2020 interview, the CEO of East African Bottling Share Company (EABSC) said that Ambo Mineral Water and EASBC were "sister companies" under CCBA.

Tours of the bottling factory are offered to the public.

Ambo is exported to Kenya, South Africa, Sudan, Saudi Arabia, the United Arab Emirates, England, Sweden, the United States and Toronto, Canada. It is bottled in 330 ML, 500 ML, 750 ML 1000 ML and 2000 ML bottles. The bottling plant operates 24 hours a day. It is sold in Ethiopian shops for around US$0.30 per bottle, and is typically priced higher in Ethiopian restaurants and hotels. At restaurants in New York City, it is sold for around US$6 per bottle.

=== Products ===
Ambo Mineral Water began to be packed in plastic bottles relatively recently, and prior to this was packed exclusively in glass bottles. New products introduced circa November 2014 were Ambo flavored water, which was formulated in several flavors, and Ambo Lite, a product with a lower mineral and carbonation content.

== See also ==
- List of bottled water brands
- List of companies of Ethiopia
