= BGI Ethiopia PLC =

Ethiopian brewery and beverage making company

- Type: Private
- Industry: Brewery; Winery; Beverage
- Founded: 1998
- Headquarters: Mexico Area, Addis Ababa, Ethiopia
- Number of locations: 7
- Area served: Worldwide
- Key people: Pierre-Emmanuel Medard (CEO)
- Products: Beer; Castel Wine
- Brands: St. George Beer, Castel Beer, Meta Bremer, Meta Decor, Raya Beer and Castel Wines
- Revenue: $6.4 million
- Owner: Brasseries International Holdings; HEBU Properties Ltd
- Number of employees: 3,000 (2025)
- Parent: Castel Group
- Subsidiaries: Zebidar Brewery, Raya Brewery, Castel Winery
- Website: bgiethiopia.com

BGI Ethiopia PLC is an Ethiopian brewery and beverage making company owned by the French brewing company Castel Group divisions Brasseries International Holdings (BIH) and HEBU Properties Ltd. Established in 1998, both groups started initial capital investment of 10 million dollars with major plants in Kombolcha, Addis Ababa, Batu, Hawassa and Raya. BGI Ethiopia owns six breweries including the most iconic Saint George Beer in Ethiopia. Its parent company, Castel Group serves various countries worldwide.

BGI Ethiopia is a major brewing company in Ethiopia with annual production capacity of 3.6 million hectoliters of bottled and draft beer. In 2009, the company started wine production named Castel Winery that produces 1.4 million hectoliters of different wines under brand names Acacia and Rift Valley. Its vineyard is located in Batu (Oromia).

== History ==
BGI Ethiopia was founded in 1998 by wing of Castel Group, Brasseries International Holdings (BIH) and Castel Afrique with 10 million dollars initial capital. Starting operation in Kombolcha, Addis Ababa, Batu, Hawassa and Raya, BGI Ethiopia owns six breweries including the Saint George Beer and Castel Winery in Ethiopia. The company annually produces 3.6 million hectoliters of bottled and draft beer. Privatization agreement was signed in September 1998 and BIH bought a total stake of 22,394 shares (73%) in BGI Ethiopia PLC in February 1999 with approved total share transfer.

In 2009, the company showed interest to a start wine production. It owns and operates Castle Winery where its vineyard is located in Batu. The winery produces 1.4 million hectoliters of different wines under brand names Cuvee Prestige, Rift Valley and Acacia. Distributed by domestic partner agents, BGI products are exported internationally to North America, Europe, the Middle East, Australia, Africa and Asia.

== Leadership ==
Emilio Garcia is the Chief Executive Officer of BGI-Ethiopia. He assumed the role on May 1, 2025.

== Brands ==
BGI Ethiopia currently produces St. George Beer, Castel Beer, Meta Bremer, Meta Decor, and Raya Beer. On the nonalcoholic market, the company brews Sen'q Malt.

== Wine ==
Under its subsidiary Castel Winery, BGI produces different wines under brand names Cuvee Prestige, Rift Valley and Acacia.

== Exports ==
BGI exports products to:

- North America (United States and Canada)
- Europe (United Kingdom, Italy, France, Germany, Switzerland, Belgium, the Netherlands etc.)
- Middle East (Israel and United Arab Emirates)
- Australia
- Africa (Kenya, Tanzania, South Africa, South Sudan, Djibouti etc.)
- Asia (China)
