= Selam Bus Line Share Company =

Bus company in Ethiopia

- Parent: Selam Bus Line Share Company
- Founded: 1996
- Headquarters: Addis Ababa, Ethiopia
- Service area: Ethiopia; Kenya
- Service type: Intercity coach service
- Stops: 80
- Destinations: 120
- Hubs: 1
- Stations: 120
- Fleet: Skandia/Volvo
- Fuel type: Gas
- Chief executive: Woldai Amaha
- Website: selambus.net

Selam Bus Line Share Company (Selam Bus Line S.C.) is one of the largest long distance bus companies in Ethiopia. It was founded in 1996 by the Tigray Development Association (TDA) to address the nationwide need for public transportation. The firm commenced operations on 9 April 1996 with a fleet of 25 IVECO buses. Selam Bus Line currently provides service to more than 17 cities in Ethiopia.

== Overview ==
In an effort to increase market share, the firm sold 6,000 shares in October 2006 through Wegagen Bank and its main office based in Mek'ele. They had a par value of 5,000 birr. Shares worth six million birr were sold to 700 new shareholders.

In November 2008, the company announced it would move from general public transportation to providing tourist transportation services. It would do this by buying 14 Scania buses at a cost of 1.6 million birr, each with a body manufactured by a Brazilian company, Marcopolo S.A.; Selam Bus Lines has plans to buy 70 more buses. The luxury tourist routes will run between Addis Ababa and the Ethiopian cities of Mek'ele, Bahir Dar, Gondar, Dire Dawa, Harar, Dessie and Awasa. They also have buses to Nairobi via Awasa and Moyale.

== See also ==
- Sky Bus Transport System
