= University of Gondar =

Medical school in Gondar, Amhara Region, Ethiopia

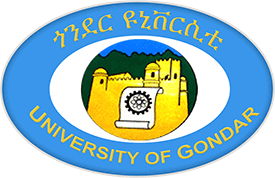
- Motto: ለልህቀት እንተጋለን
- Motto in English: Devoted to excellence
- Established: 1954
- President: Asrat Atsedeweyn
- Academic staff: 2,546
- Administrative staff: 5,473
- Undergraduates: 41,730
- Postgraduates: 5,497
- Location: Gondar, Amhara Region, Ethiopia; 12.584°N 37.443°E
- Colours: Blue, yellow & white
- Website: www.uog.edu.et
- Location within Ethiopia

The University of Gondar, until 2003 known as the Gondar College of Medical Sciences, is the oldest medical school in Ethiopia. Established as the Public Health College in 1954, it is located in Gondar, in Amhara Region of Ethiopia. In 2010, the university offered 42 undergraduate and 17 postgraduate programs.

As of 2016, the university offers 56 undergraduate and 64 postgraduate programs. These are organized under the College of Medicine and Health Sciences, College of Business and Economics, College of Natural and Computational Sciences, College of Social Sciences and Humanities, and Faculty of Veterinary Medicine and Faculty of Agriculture, and three schools (School of Law, School of Technology and School of Education). The current president of the university is Dr. Asrat Atsedeweyn.

== History ==
The Public Health College was established following an agreement signed by the acting Ethiopian minister of public health, Marsae Hazan Wolde Qiros, and the government of the United States in April, 1954. The Ethiopian government signed a similar agreement with the World Health Organization September of that year. These agreements specified that the college would consist of four parts: a training school, a hospital, and awraja (regional district) and municipal health departments. As a result, the college played a significant role in improving public health in Gondar over the next few years.

The training school's mission was to supply middle-level health professionals who would operate a network of health centers distributed across the country. Each center would be staffed by a health officer, a community nurse, a sanitarian and a laboratory technician, and was expected to care for about 50,000 people. The first health centers were built around Gondar, but as the Public Health College came to be responsible for the public health of Begemder Province as well, they were forced to build new centers ever further away.

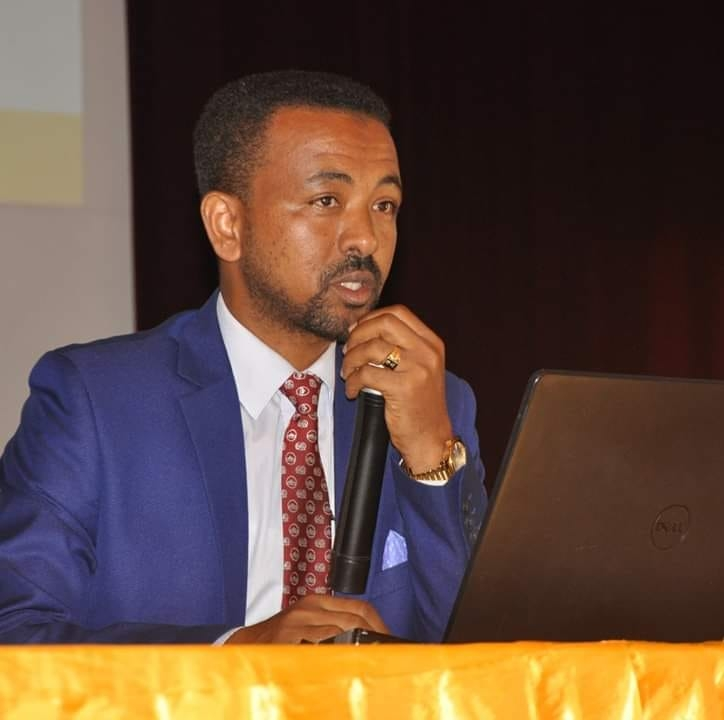
University of Gondar President Dr. Asrat Atsedeweyn taking part in an international conference organized by the University of Gondar

One of the results of signing a new treaty between the United States and Ethiopia in June 1960 was the upgrade of the Public Health College to full college status. However, when Haile Selassie University (since renamed Addis Ababa University) became a chartered institution, it received the responsibility for all higher education in the country, and the Public Health College was made a part of the university. Its innovative program is based on field work, and its work to improve public health in Gondar and Begemder province were replaced by an emphasis on academic coursework which led to a Bachelor of Science in Public Health.

While remaining part of Addis Ababa University, the former Haileselassie University Gondar College was reorganized with the help of Karl Marx University in East Germany (now known as Leipzig University) in 1978; in 1992, the college regained its autonomy. The subsequent creation of a Faculty of Management Science and Economics, a Faculty of Social Sciences and Humanities and a Faculty of Applied Natural Sciences enabled the college to grow into University College in 2003; the following year the institution was renamed the University of Gondar.

== See also ==
- Health in Ethiopia
- Education in Ethiopia
