= Sky Bus Transport System =

Intercity coach transport company in Ethiopia

Sky Bus Transport System s.c.
- Parent: Sky Bus Transport System share company
- Founded: October 15, 2007
- Headquarters: Addis Ababa
- Service area: Ethiopia
- Service type: Intercity coach service
- Destinations: Addis Ababa, Bahirdar, Diredawa, Harar, Gondor, Jimma, Hawassa, Jigjiga, Dessie, Mekelle and Asossa.
- Hubs: Addis Ababa
- Daily ridership: Coaches
- Fuel type: Diesel
- Chief executive: Mesfin Ayele
- Website: www.skybusethiopia.com

Sky Bus Transport System Share Company is a first modern intercity coach transport company in Addis Ababa, Ethiopia. It was established by more than 3400 shareholders with a registered capital of birr 60 million.

== Overview ==
Sky Bus is directed by a Board of Directors and managed and operated by highly qualified professionals in various disciplines and many years of experience in the transport sector, it is now functioning across ten major destinations in Ethiopia. The firm has also announced plans to cover the whole country in the coming few years and expand service to other nations in the Horn of Africa. The bodies of the buses are manufactured by Jinhun Youngman, automobile manufacturing company of China, in joint venture with Neoplan of Germany. The buses are luxury coaches powered by world-class MAN 310 horsepower engines. In addition, ZF manufactured our buses’ axles (front and rear) and gearboxes with air suspensions and leveling mechanisms. The steering and brake systems are German products. Instead of the traditional 62 seats, Buses have 47 seats leaving more space for the passengers’ comfort with safety belt all round and individually controlled air conditioning system.

Although SkyBus was established with a great vision of connecting Ethiopian cities and even Ethiopia with neighboring countries, the company has long stopped operating, about two years, due to an utter bankruptcy that resulted from poor management, corruption, and direct and inappropriate manipulation of the company by higher entities of TPLF, the now ousted group that controlled the country for over three decades. The company's website indicated in this article used to be functional but doesn't exist now.

== See also ==
- Selam Bus Line Share Company
