= Bahir Dar =

Capital of Amhara Region, Ethiopia

Bahir Dar ባሕር ዳር (Amharic)
- Capital city
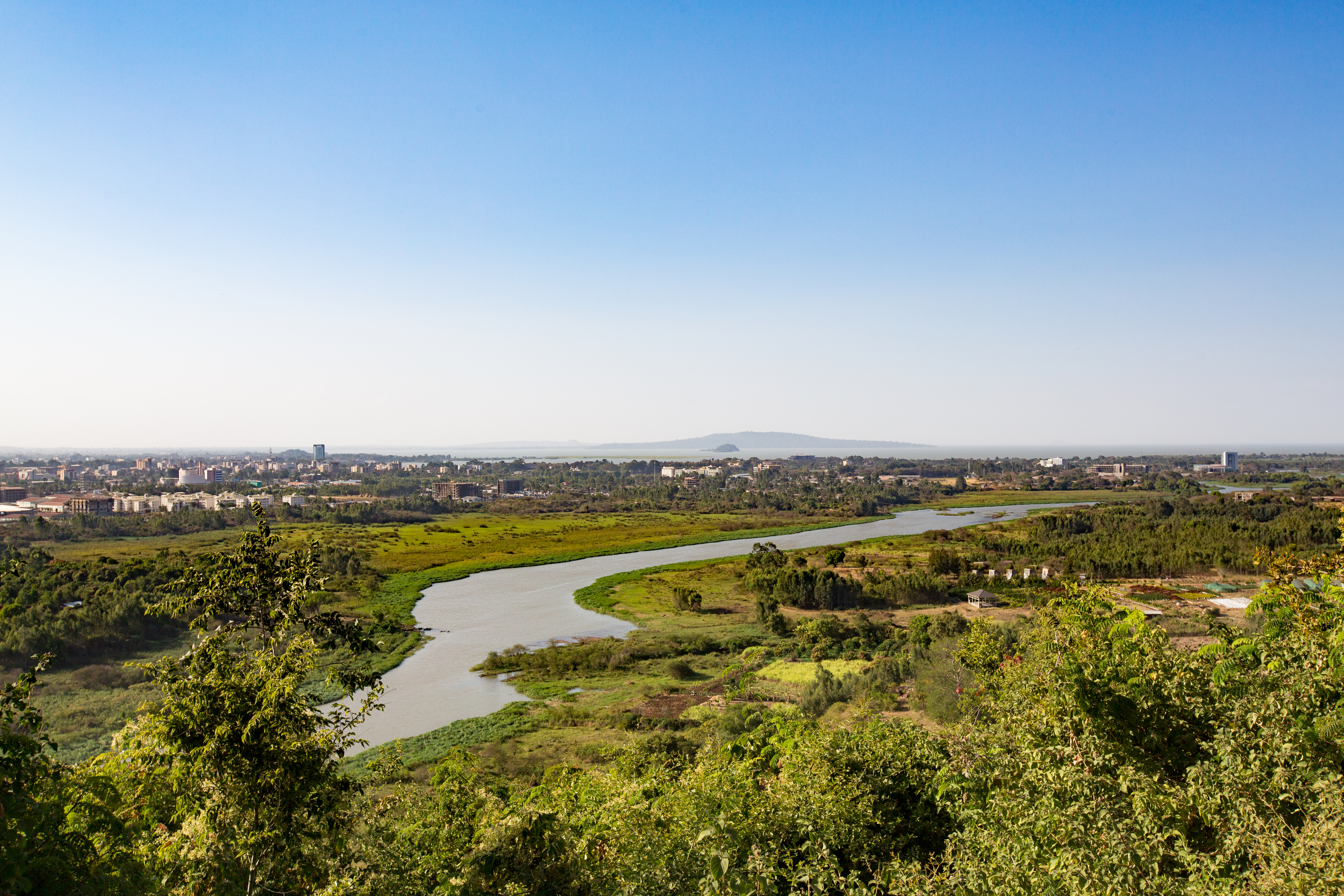
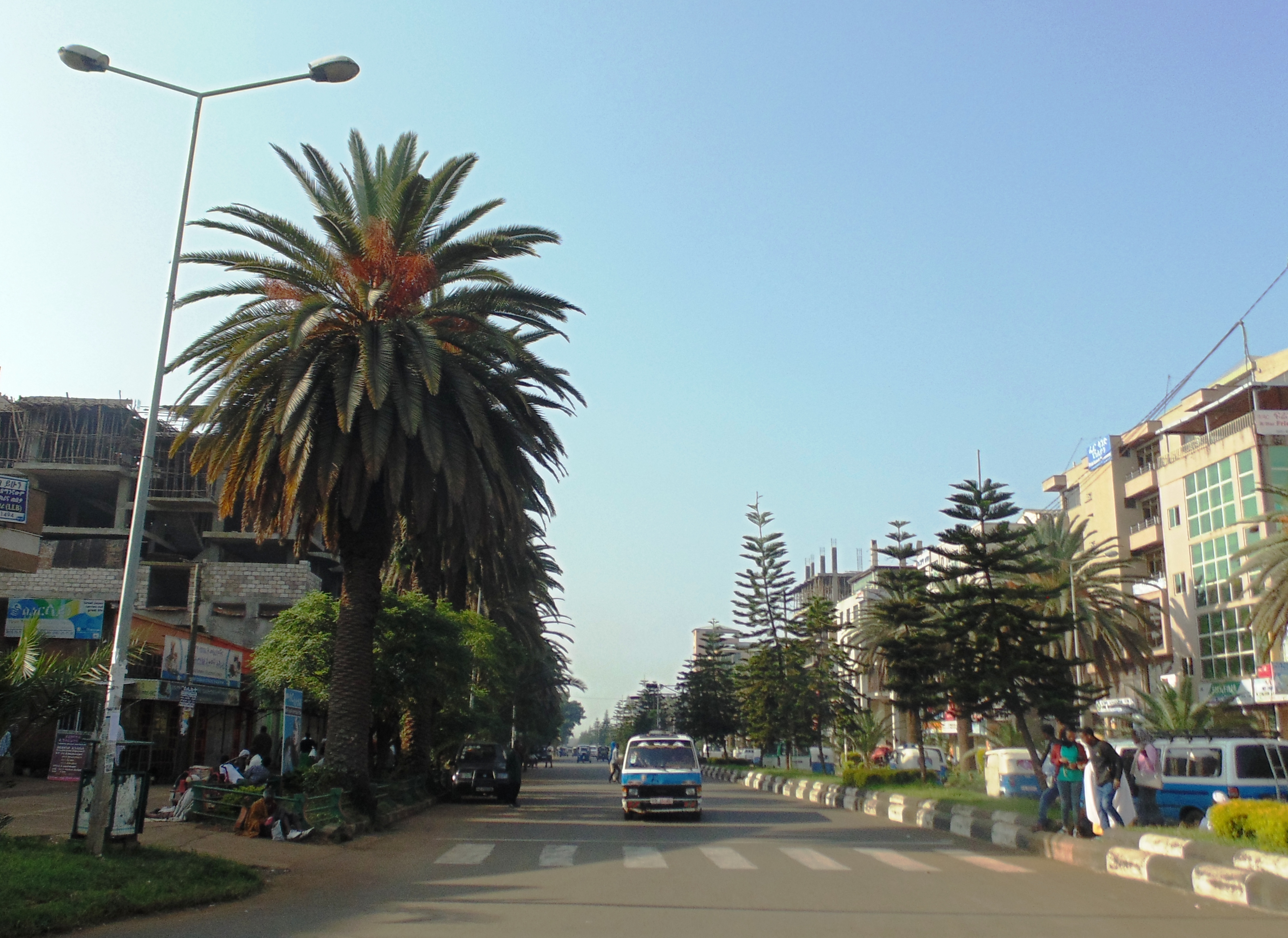
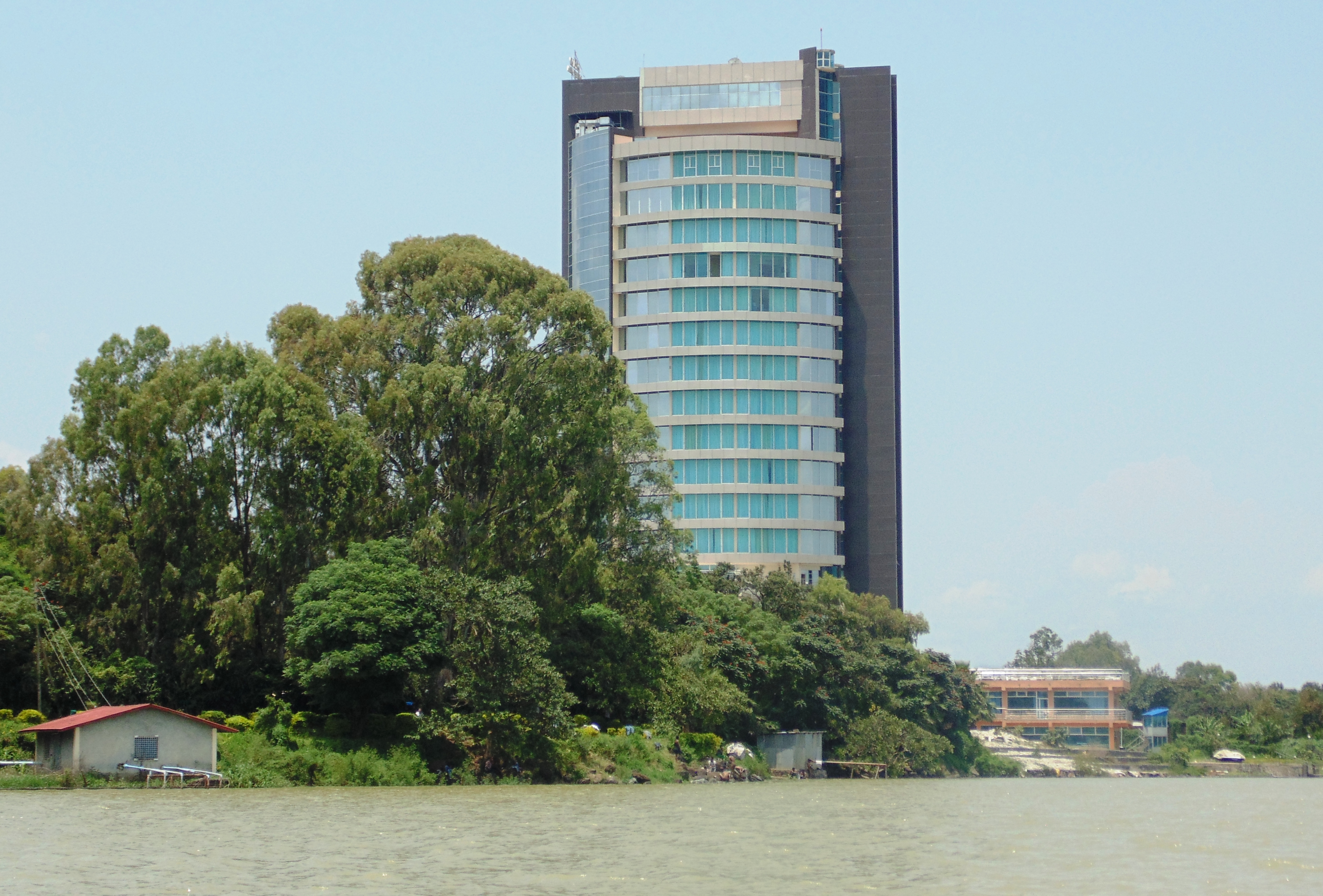
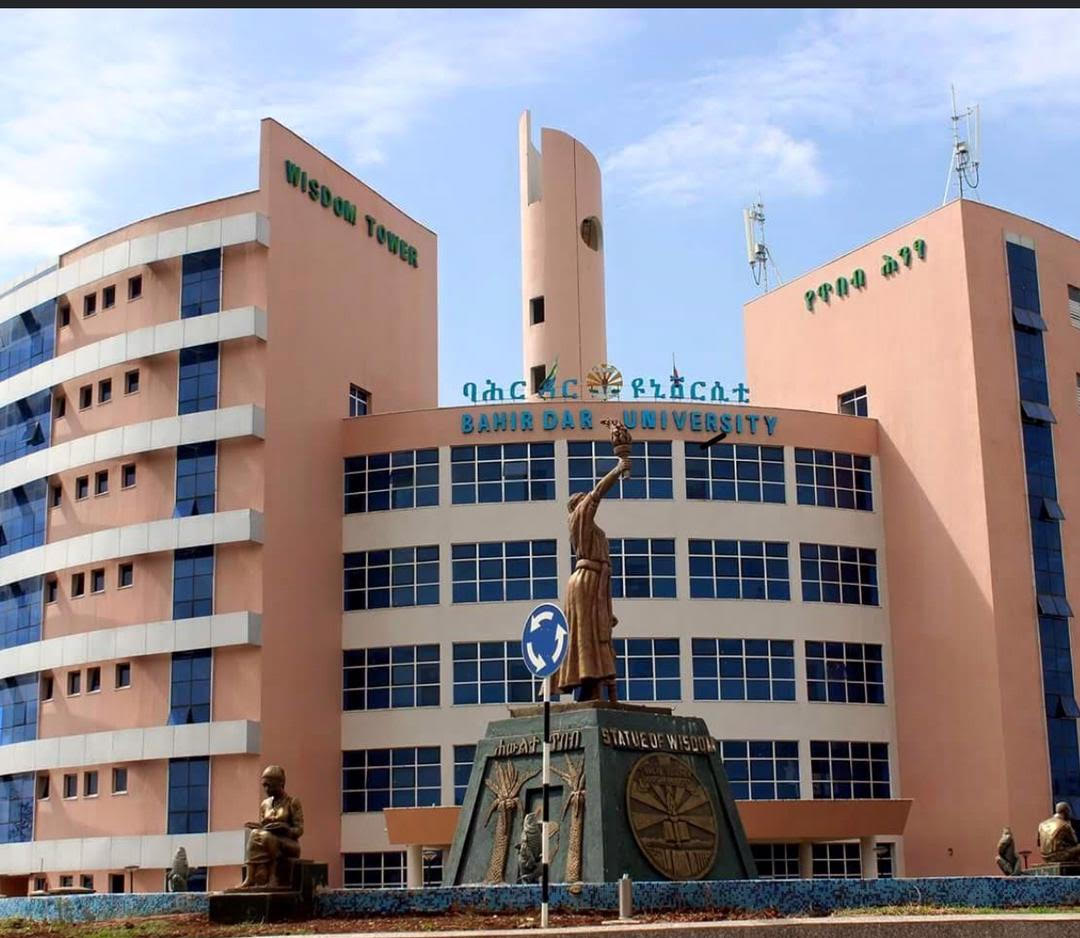
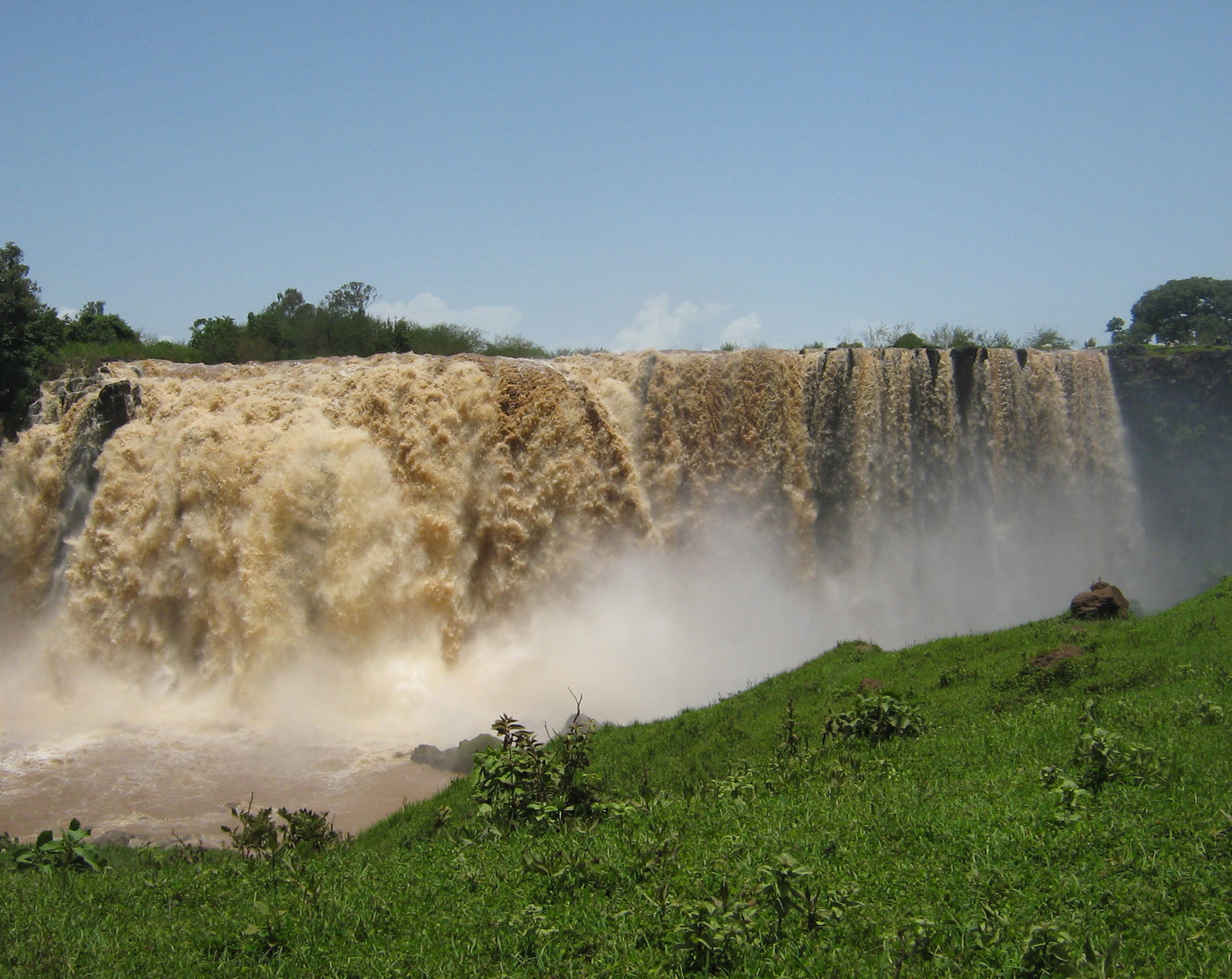
- From top: The Blue Nile with the city of Bahir Dar; A street in Bahir Dar; A high-rise building; Bahir Dar University; Blue Nile Falls

- Location within Ethiopia Location within the Horn of Africa Location within Africa
- Coordinates: 11°36′N 37°23′E
- Country: Ethiopia
- Region: Amhara
- Zone: Bahir Dar Special Zone

Area
  - Total: 213.44 km^{2} (82.41 sq mi)
- Elevation: 1,800 m (5,900 ft)

Population (2024)
  - Total: 640,000
  - Estimate (2023): 1,130,000
  - Density: 3,000/km^{2} (7,800/sq mi)
- Time zone: UTC+3 (EAT)
- Area code: (+251) 58

Bahir Dar (Amharic: ባሕር ዳር, lit. 'sea shore') is the capital city of Amhara Region, Ethiopia. Bahir Dar is one of the leading tourist destinations in Ethiopia, with a variety of attractions in the nearby Lake Tana and Blue Nile river. The city is known for its wide avenues lined with palm trees and a variety of colorful flowers. In 2002, it was awarded the UNESCO Cities for Peace Prize for addressing the challenges of rapid urbanization.

== History ==
=== Origins ===
Originally the settlement was called Bahir Giyorgis. Between 1810 and 1900, Bahir Dar had 1,200 to 2,000 inhabitants. It was developed in situ as a monastery and function of trading hub. In the 19th century, Bahir Dar was visited by Belgian, French, British and Italian travelers, who described it alternatively as a village or a town.

=== 20th century ===
During the early 20th century, the British, desiring to construct a barrage at the outlet of Lake Tana, dispatched several study teams, such as those of Dupis (1902), Grabham and Black (1920–21) and Cheesman (1926–34). In 1930 the Ethiopian Government sent to Bahir Dar its own team of experts, who described Bahir Dar as a village with considerable trading activity, with a population from the interior as well as from Lake Tana ports such as Zege. At this time Bahir Dar was characterized by various traditional settlement areas, each of which was distinguished by the social position its members occupied. The kahenat (clergy) and balabbat (landowner) communities were the most prestigious. In addition, three groups of tenant-craftsman communities, tanners, Muslims weavers and the Weyto stone-mill grinders, lived on balabbat lands. Although all were economically interdependent, there was no intermarriage between the tenant communities or between them and the balabbat and kahenat.

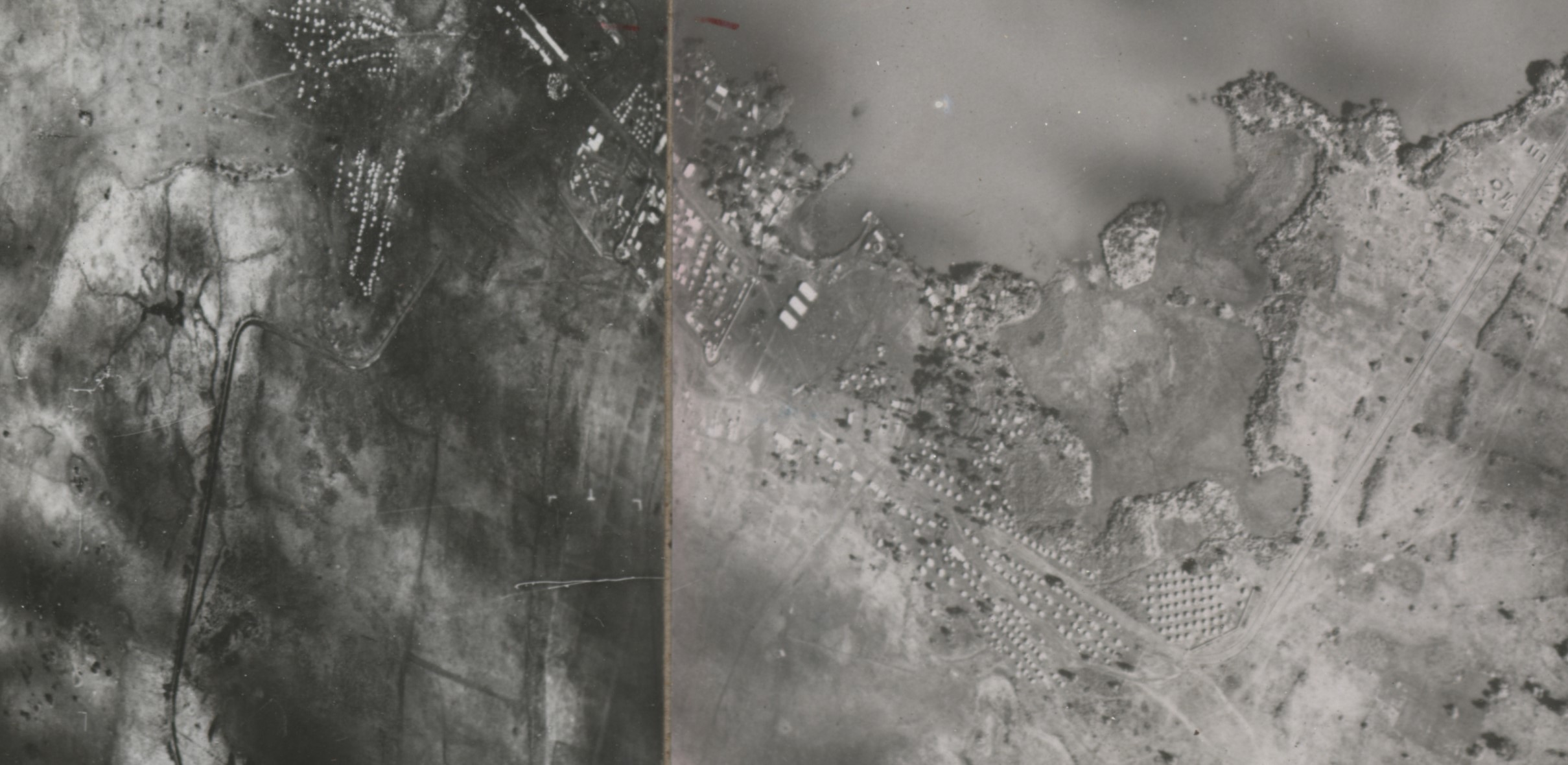
Aerial view of Bahir Dar in 1938

In May 1936, Bahir Dar was occupied by the Italians, who gave it modern urban features. Abolishing communal family ownership of land known as "Rists," they instituted private ownership. Alienating the balabbats from their rists, they allocated land for administration, the army, an airstrip and port facilities. New residential and commercial zones were demarcated. Bahir Dar was connected by motor-boats with other Lake Tana ports and by motor roads with Gonder, Debre Marqos and Addis Ababa. The physical and social appearance of Bahir Dar was considerably changed. New settlement patterns emerged: an Italian camp, a Muslim community and a Weyto quarter, while the tanners' quarter remained unaffected. Bahir Dar became a melting-pot of different people and cultures. In the commercial zone, different types of shops, tea-rooms, tailor shops, bars and restaurants run by foreigners made their first appearance. Ethiopian influence on this reorganization was insignificant.

The Italians gave Bahir Dar political importance by making it the administrative center of the Lake Tana southern territories. They were also interested in the agricultural development of Lake Tana and the Blue Nile and in exploiting their waters for hydroelectric power. In 1941, the Ethiopian Government was reinstated. It made Bahir Dar a sub-district capital and then a district capital. Various offices and public services were set up. In 1945 Bahir Dar was raised to the status of a municipality. In the early 1950s, it was considered to be the best potential site for the construction of an alternative capital of Ethiopia.

During the 1960s and 1970s, Bahir Dar grew rapidly, being the capital of the eponymous awrajja (county) in the Gojjam province. The central government developed the city as a market and transportation center of the economic growth of Lake Tana and the Blue Nile basin. A comprehensive master plan, with new zoning, was prepared by German experts. Its implementation completely changed the physical appearance of Bahir Dar, due to industrial and economic development. It was provided with a water supply, hydroelectric power, improved lake-port facilities, the Abbay Bridge, textile mills, a hospital, and the institutions of higher education which now form Bahir Dar University.

During the Ethiopian Civil War, in May 1988 the 603rd corp of the Third Revolutionary Army (TLA) made its headquarters at Bahir Dar. On 3–4 March 1990, the TLA abandoned Bahir Dar in disarray, blowing up the nearby bridge with several hundred soldiers which stopped the opposing Ethiopian People's Revolutionary Democratic Front (EPRDF) forces from occupying the city. However, the EPRDF had stated that they lacked the resources in the area to capture the town at that time, and the Derg army reoccupied Bahir Dar a few days later. The EPRDF gained permanent control of the city at around 18:10 hours on 23 February 1991, as one of the objectives of Operation Tewodros. In the 1990s Bahir Dar experienced remarkable growth and expansion. It has become the capital of the Amhara National State. The country's free-market economic policy has encouraged investment and other market potentialities. Today Bahir Dar is not only a center of administration but also a nucleus of commerce, industry, transport, communication, health, education and tourism.

=== 21st century ===
The city, in honor of the Millennium celebrations, hosted a National Investment Bazaar and Trade Fair on 6–9 January 2007. Mulat Gezahegn, head of the Trade, Industry and Investment Promotion Coordination Office, told journalists that more than 150 local and foreign companies participated.

On 22 June 2019, during the Amhara Region coup d'état attempt, there were coordinated assassinations of Amhara Region government officials in Bahir Dar and Addis Ababa. Assassination victims included General Se'are Mekonnen (along with his aide General Gizae Aberra), President of Amhara Region Ambachew Mekonnen (along with advisor Ezez Wassie) and Amhara Region Attorney General Megbaru Kebede. On 24 June, state media announced that General Asaminew Tsige had been shot dead in Bahir Dar.

== Geography ==
Bahir Dar is located at the exit of the Abbay from Lake Tana at an altitude of 1,820 metres (5,970 ft) above sea level. The city is located approximately 578 km north-northwest of Addis Ababa. The Lake Tana region is a UNESCO Biosphere Reserve since 2015.

=== Climate ===
Bahir Dar has a borderline tropical savanna climate (Köppen Aw), very close to a subtropical highland climate (Cwb). Afternoon temperatures are very warm to hot year-round, and morning temperatures cool; however, the diurnal range is much larger in the largely cloudless dry season.

Climate data for Bahir Dar
Month	Jan	Feb	Mar	Apr	May	Jun	Jul	Aug	Sep	Oct	Nov	Dec	Year
Record high °C (°F)	37 (99)	36 (97)	36 (97)	38 (100)	38 (100)	32 (90)	30 (86)	29 (84)	29 (84)	35 (95)	35 (95)	33 (91)	38 (100)
Mean daily maximum °C (°F)	26.7 (80.1)	28.2 (82.8)	29.5 (85.1)	30.0 (86.0)	29.2 (84.6)	26.9 (80.4)	24.4 (75.9)	24.3 (75.7)	25.5 (77.9)	26.5 (79.7)	26.7 (80.1)	26.6 (79.9)	27.0 (80.7)
Daily mean °C (°F)	17.8 (64.0)	19.4 (66.9)	21.4 (70.5)	22.4 (72.3)	22.3 (72.1)	20.9 (69.6)	19.4 (66.9)	19.2 (66.6)	19.6 (67.3)	19.9 (67.8)	19.1 (66.4)	18.0 (64.4)	20.0 (67.9)
Mean daily minimum °C (°F)	8.8 (47.8)	10.5 (50.9)	13.3 (55.9)	14.7 (58.5)	15.4 (59.7)	14.9 (58.8)	14.4 (57.9)	14.1 (57.4)	13.6 (56.5)	13.3 (55.9)	11.4 (52.5)	9.4 (48.9)	12.8 (55.1)
Record low °C (°F)	8 (46)	8 (46)	9 (48)	5 (41)	6 (43)	10 (50)	9 (48)	8 (46)	7 (45)	7 (45)	9 (48)	6 (43)	5 (41)
Average precipitation mm (inches)	2.3 (0.09)	1.6 (0.06)	6.7 (0.26)	24.2 (0.95)	90.9 (3.58)	196.8 (7.75)	410.0 (16.14)	377.3 (14.85)	199.9 (7.87)	99.1 (3.90)	15.3 (0.60)	3.4 (0.13)	1,427.5 (56.18)
Average rainy days (≥ 0.1 mm)	1	1	2	3	10	18	28	28	20	10	3	1	125
Source 1: Ethiopian Meteorological InstituteWorld Meteorological Organisation (rainy days)
Source 2: National Meteorology Agency (records)

== Demographics ==
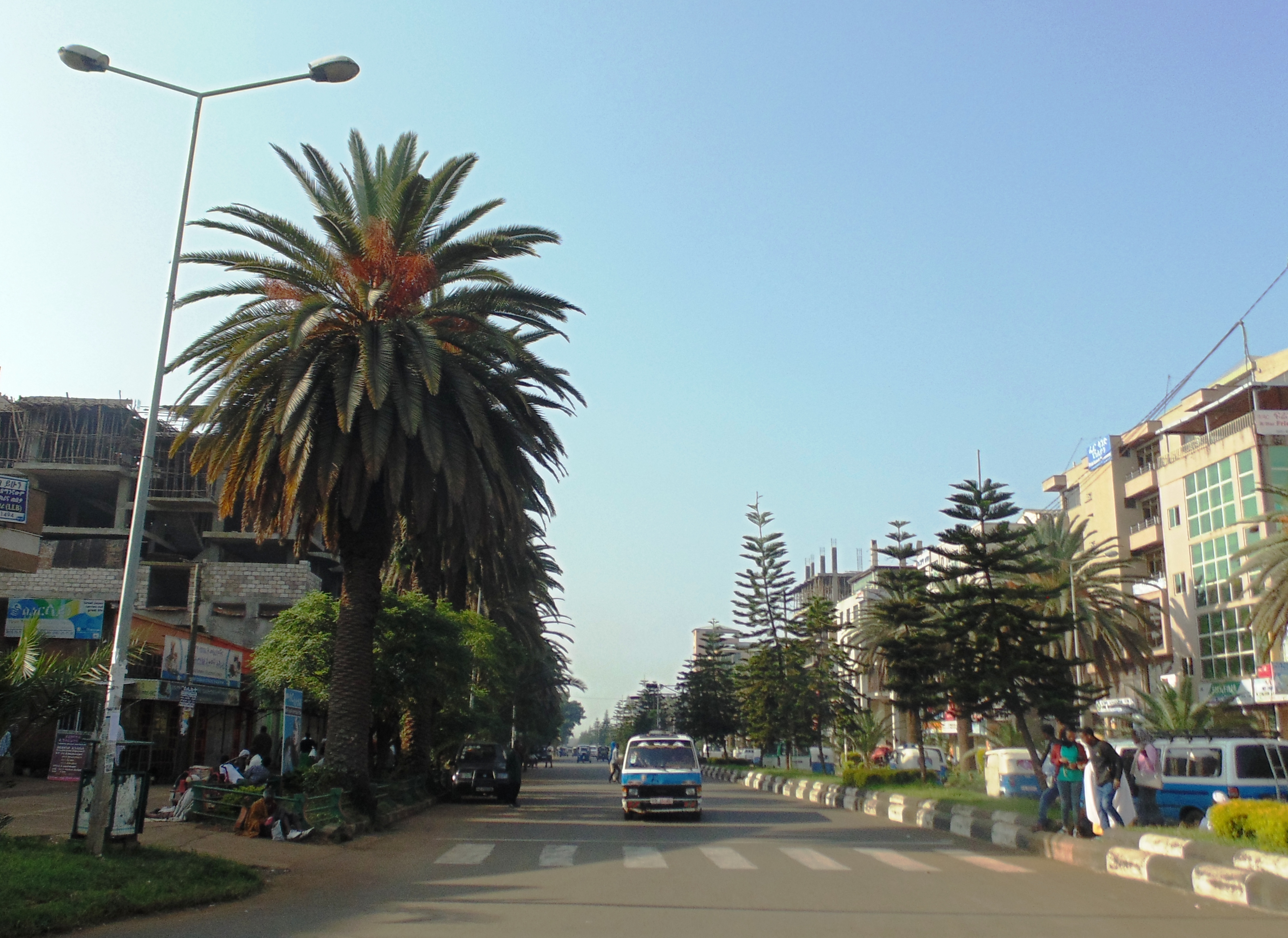
A street in Bahir Dar

Based on the 2007 Census conducted by the Central Statistical Agency of Ethiopia (CSA), Bahir Dar Special Zone had a total population of 221,991, of whom 108,456 were male and 113,535 female; 180,174 or 81.16% were urban inhabitants, the rest of population were living in rural kebeles around Bahir Dar. As Philip Briggs notes, Bahir Dar "is not only one of the largest towns in Ethiopia, but also one of the fastest growing – the western outskirts have visibly expanded since...1994." In fact, Bahir Dar City had an average annual population growth of 5.31% from 2007 to 2023, while Bahir Dar Special Zone had an annual growth rate of 4.75%.

Historical population
Year	Pop.	±%
1984	54,800	—
1994	96,140	+75.4%
2007	155,428	+61.7%
2023	365,957	+135.5%

=== Ethnic and linguistic composition ===
As of 2007, the three largest ethnic groups reported in Bahir Dar Special Zone were the Amhara (96.23%), the Tigrayan (1.11%), and the Oromo (1.10%); all other ethnic groups made up 1.56% of the population. Amharic was spoken as a first language by 96.77%, Oromiffa by 1.03%, and Tigrinya by 0.98%; the remaining 1.22% spoke all other primary languages reported.

The 1994 national census had reported a total population for Bahir Dar of 96,140 in 20,857 households, of whom 45,436 were men and were 50,704 women. The three largest ethnic groups reported in the city were the Amhara (93.21%), the Tigrayan (3.98%), and the Agew (0.70%); all other ethnic groups made up 2.11% of the population. Amharic was spoken as a first language by 95.52%, and 2.93% spoke Tigrinya; the remaining 1.55% spoke all other primary languages reported.

Ethnic groups of Bahir Dar as of 2007
1. Amhara (96.2%)
2. Tigrayan (1.11%)
3. Agew (1.10%)
4. Other (1.56%)

=== The Wayto caste ===
In 1938, an Italian tourist guide noted well established Wayto villages on Bahir Dar's lakeshore.

The Wayto nowadays live in three distinct villages within Bahir Dar's city boundaries; the buildings are made of clay with thatched roofs and have a lifespan of about five years.

In Bahir Dar, the Wayto are outcast because their traditional lifestyle is considered impure; for the Orthodox Christians the food habits are impure, and the Muslim community does not recognise them because the Wayto continue to worship the Nile River. Hence, the majority of the population remains wary of the Wayto.

Power relations in the early constitution of Bahir Dar as a town have led to a situation in which the marginalisation of the Wayto has been institutionalised. Access to the city's facilities, including education and health care, remain out of reach based on stigmata. — Nadine Appelhans, PhD thesis, Hamburg University

The health of the Wayto community in Bahir Dar is affected because they continue drinking the lake water, which has become strongly polluted.

The Wayto villages need regularly to change their place by order of the authorities for several reasons:

- ritual places are contested by other population groups;
- Amhara have greater financial power to obtain the land;
- the Wayto do not hold land titles; and
- overall, they have a weak position in negotiation.

=== Religions ===
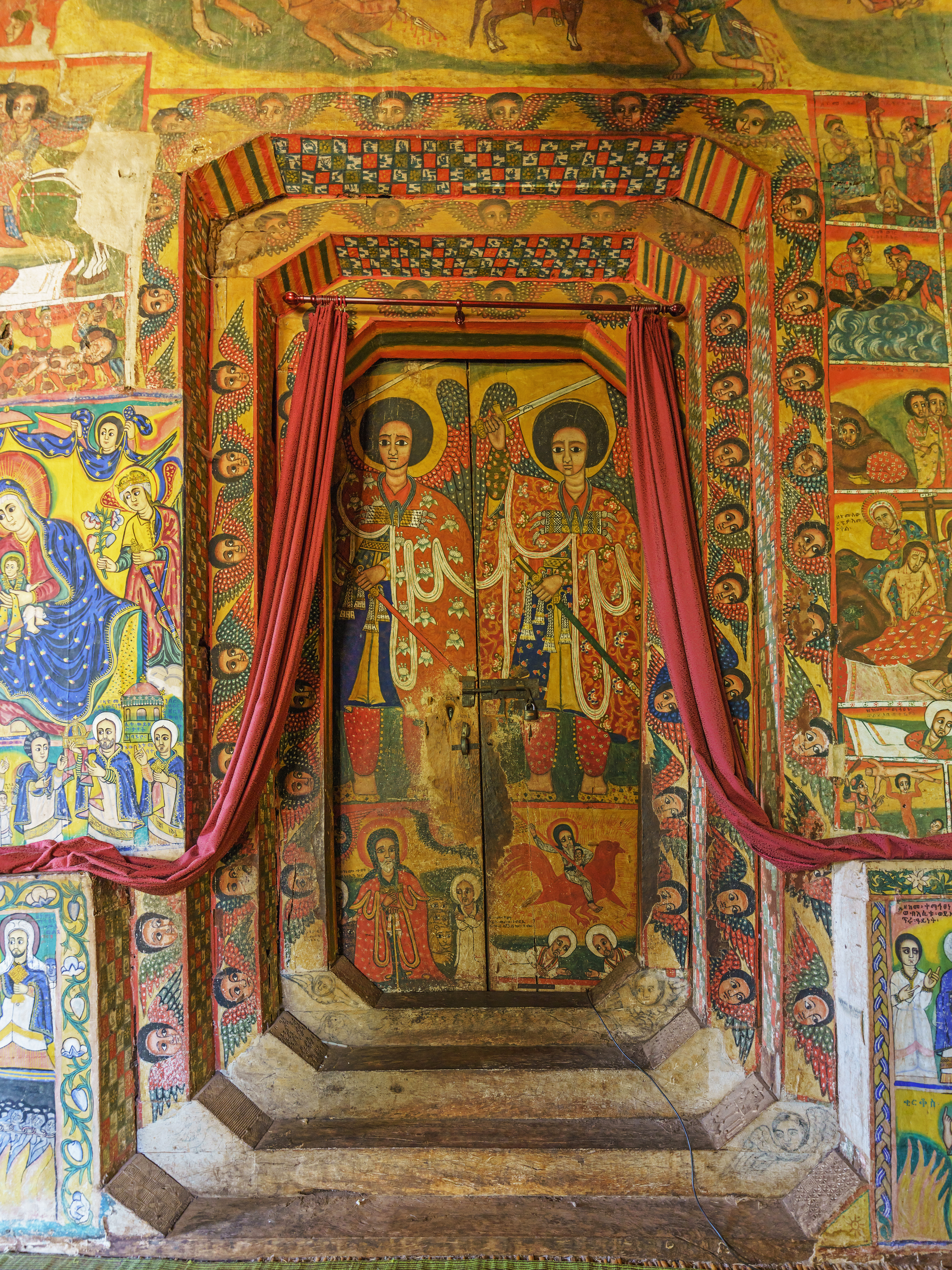
A mural in a church on Lake Tana, near Bahir Dar

In 2007 census 89.72% of the population said they practiced Ethiopian Orthodox Christianity, 8.47% were Muslim, and 1.62% were Protestants.

The 1994 national census reported 87.53% practiced Ethiopian Orthodox Christianity, and 11.47% of the population said they were Muslim.

The Ethiopian Catholics, who practice the Alexandrian Rite in Geez language, have a cathedral in the city, which is the Episcopal See since 2015 of the Ethiopic Catholic Diocese of Bahir Dar–Dessie, one of the suffragan eparchies (dioceses) of the Ethiopian Catholic Archeparchy of Addis Abeba, a Metropolitanate sui juris.

== Culture ==
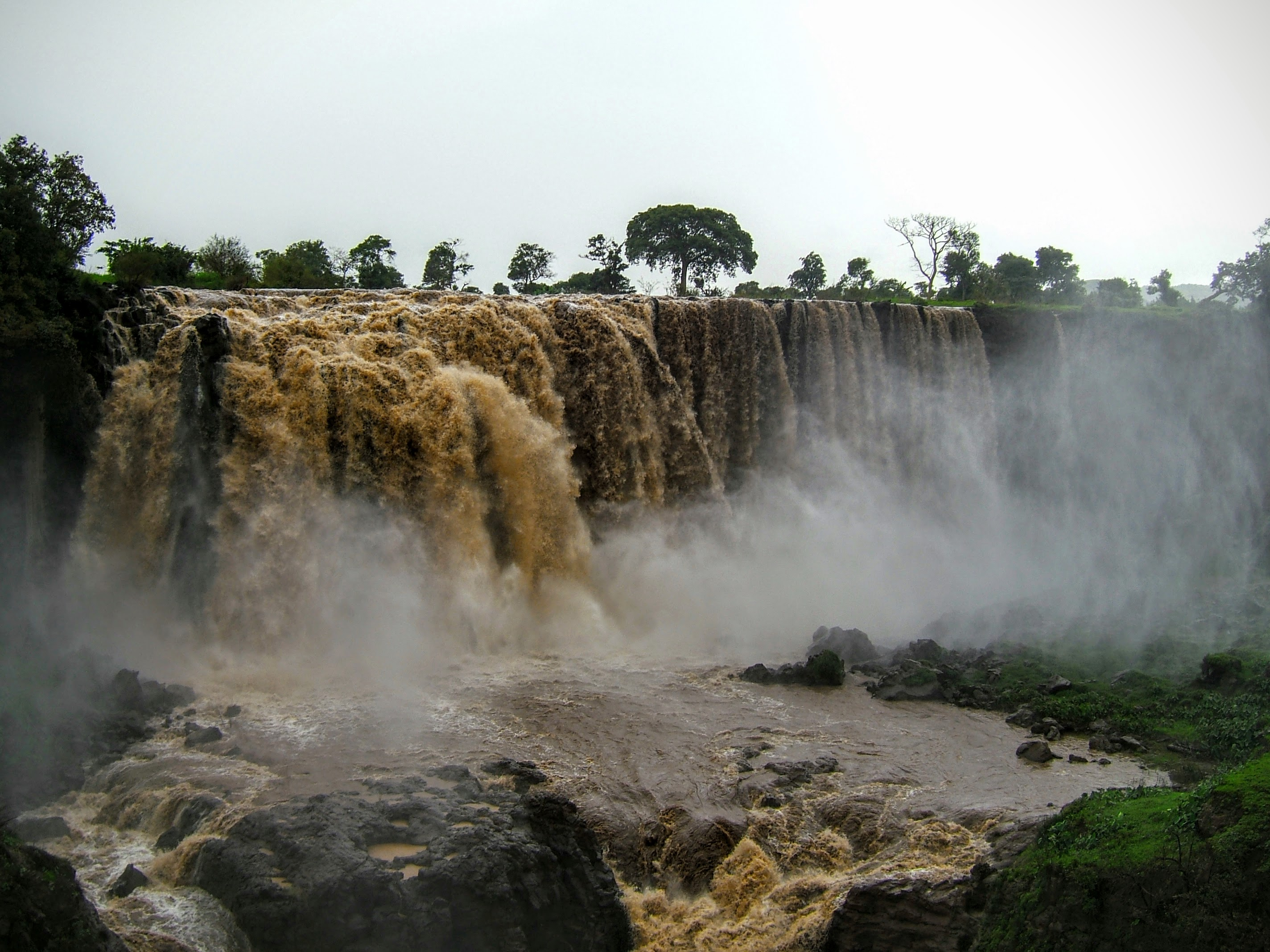
The Blue Nile Falls as they looked before a hydro system was installed. Some of the river water is tunneled from above the Falls down into a fairly small HEP plant.

The city offers a small daily market and a very extensive weekly market. There are some music clubs in the city.

The Blue Nile Falls (Tis Issat) are located about 30 km to the south. Nowadays the amount of water running through the falls is being reduced and regulated, since the construction of a hydroelectric power dam. Nevertheless, the Blue Nile Falls are still one of the main tourist attractions of Bahir Dar, especially during the rainy season when the water level rises and the falls become greater.

== Education ==
Bahir Dar is home to a number of universities and colleges. The most prominent of all is the Bahir Dar University, which projects an enrollment of over 40,000 students in the academic year beginning in October 2012. Bahir Dar University is home to more than 40,000 students. Emperor Haile Sellasie inaugurated the Technical School in Bahir Dar University on 11 June 1963.

As part of political initiatives and development efforts in Africa, renewed interest in the higher education in Ethiopia has been the focus of partnerships between governmental and private funders. The Ethiopian university system has been noted as one of the "fastest growing" systems in the twenty-first century.

Bahir Dar University, one of the largest universities in Ethiopia, has an enrollment of 45,000 students in 65 undergraduate and 67 graduate programs. A Council of Ministers regulation combined the Bahir Dar Polytechnic and Bahir Dar Teachers' College in 2000 to establish the university. Supporting the country's objective to attain a "middle-income status" by 2025, a research priority has produced eleven research centers. within the university.

As part of the US AID objective IR 3.2: Improved workforce skills development, an identified strategy of enhancing "... university partnerships with U.S. Universities to strengthen the capacity of Ethiopian Universities." Primary and secondary education goals are supported by the university through teacher education programs designed to improve literacy rates, supporting employment and higher education opportunities for citizens. Degrees in science and health support the effort to address Ethiopia's inclusion as one of 57 countries on the health workforce crisis list.

Alkan University College is located in Bahir Dar. The Institute of Land Administration was founded and located in Bahir Dar in 2006.

The city has numerous government schools including a STEM-based High School that is within the University. There are many private schools, including Bahir Dar Academy, Rispins International School, and an SOS school.

== Transportation ==
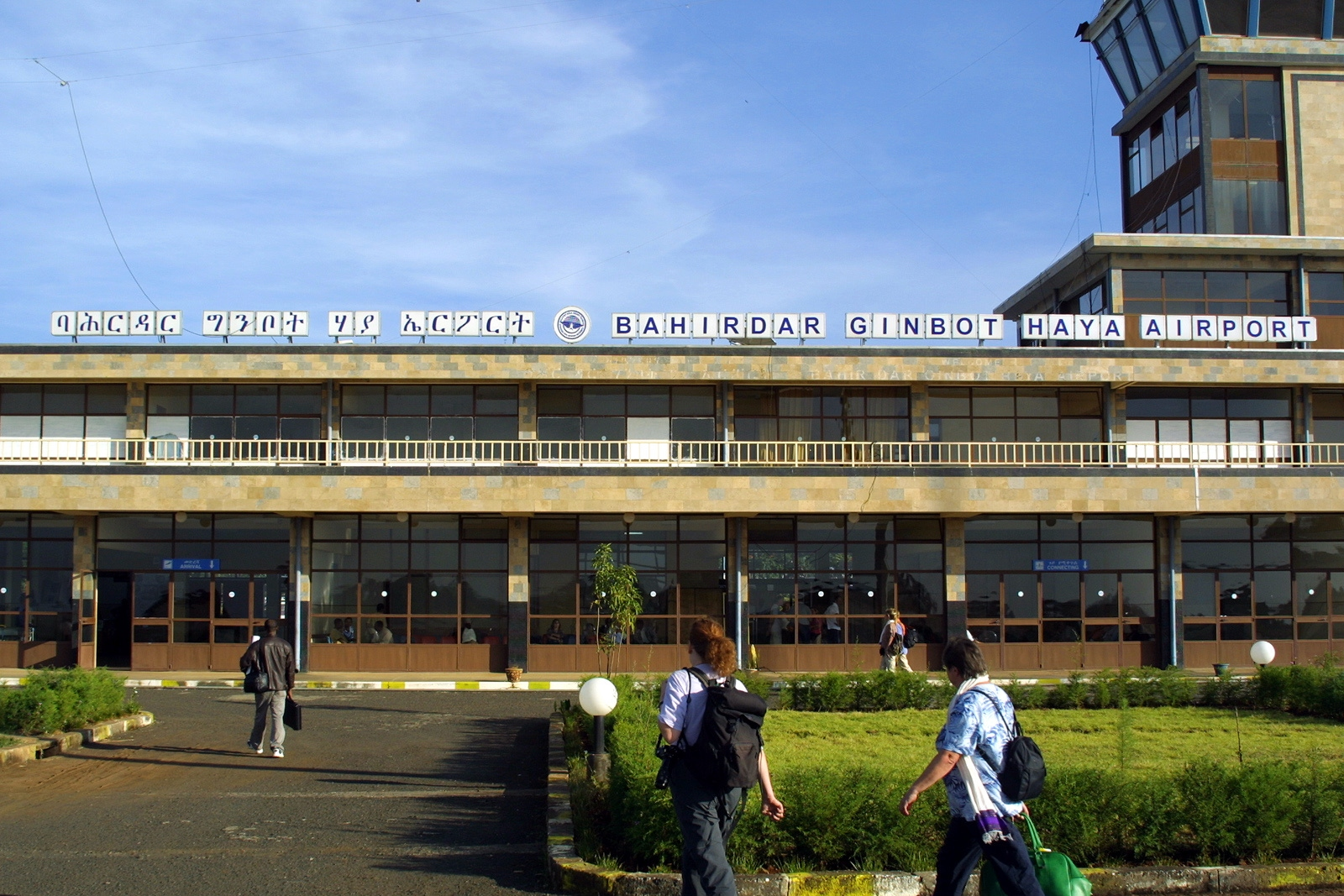
Front entrance to the Bahir Dar Dejazmach Belay Zeleke Airport.

Air transportation in Bahir Dar is served by the Bahir Dar Dejazmach Belay Zeleke Airport. There are up to ten flights a day which connect with Addis Ababa.

The runway was extended to cope with International flights. Horticultural products and other exports can now leave by air.

Additionally, the city is also connected through roads (and buslines) to those cities. The most common and convenient way of traveling in Bahir Dar is cycling. Auto rickshaws and share taxis also provide transportation in the city. Intercity bus service is provided by the Selam Bus Line Share Company, Abay Bus s.c, Ethio Bus s.c and Sky Bus Transport System which operates daily to and from the capital. Tickets offices are mainly in the mall at the south end of the high street, on the left if you have walked up from the lake area/Giorgis.

Now, in 2021, a new road bridge across the Nile, is under construction. It will soon carry the main road to the northern outskirts and on to Gondar

== Sports ==
Association football is the most popular sport in Bahir Dar. The 60,000-capacity Bahir Dar Stadium and the 15,000-capacity Bahir Dar University Stadium are the main sports venues.

== Twin towns – sister cities ==
Bahir Dar is twinned with:

- Ashdod, Israel (2011)
- Cleveland, United States (2004)
- Madison, United States (2018)
- Oakland, United States (2010)

== See also ==
- Ethiopian Airlines Flight 604 – an aircraft accident at the airport in 1988
