= Bahir Dar University =

Public research university in Bahir Dar, Ethiopia

Bahirdar University
- ባሕር ዳር ዩኒቨርስቲ
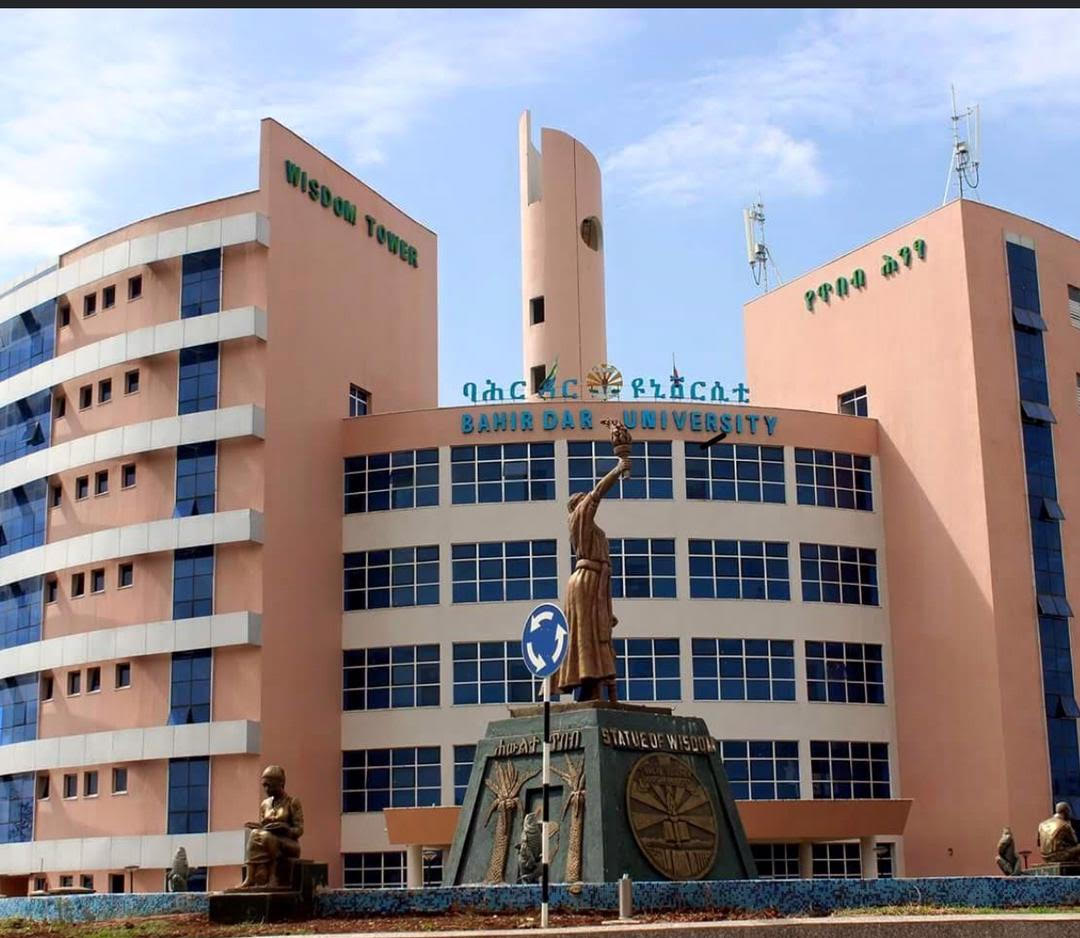
- Motto: Wisdom at the Source of the Blue Nile
- Type: Public
- Established: 1954 (as polytechnic college); 2001 (as university)
- President: Dr. Mengesha Ayene Ejigu
- Students: 54,000 students (2018)
- Location: Bahir Dar, Amhara Region, Ethiopia; 11.574°N 37.398°E
- Campus: 8 campuses
- Language: English
- Colors
- Website: www.bdu.edu.et

- Location in Ethiopia

Bahir Dar University (Amharic: ባሕር ዳር ዩኒቨርስቲ, BDU) is a public research university in Bahir Dar, capital of the Amhara Region, Ethiopia. The university, with two institutes in diploma programs until 1966, is credited to training distinguished scientists and notable public servants. BDU began offering bachelor's degree programs in 1966 and continues to expand its research and teaching in all fields and levels of study, including PhD programs. The official slogan of the university is "Wisdom at the source of the Blue Nile". Currently the university has five colleges, four institutes, seven faculties, two academies, and two schools.

== Sports ==
The Bahir Dar University has a 25,000-capacity stadium on its campus, named Bahir Dar University Stadium, in Bahir Dar. It is used mostly for association football matches. It is also sometimes used for athletics.

== Establishment ==
Bahir Dar University was created from the merger of two former higher institutions. The first was Bahir Dar Polytechnic Institute, which formed one of the faculties of the university, was established in 1963 under the technical cooperation between the Government of USSR and the Imperial Government of Ethiopia. The objective of the institute was to train skilled technicians in the fields of Agro-Mechanics, Industrial Chemistry and Metal, Textile, Electrical and Wood Technologies. The Institute had to undergo number of program changes within the area of technology until the commencement of the Engineering degree program 1996. Throughout these program changes, the institute did all what it could to supply the labor market with the best technicians who are now running most of the businesses in the industrial, educational, agricultural and other sectors.

The other institution of higher learning was Bahir Dar Teachers College, which had been established more than three decades ago. Its original name was the Academy of Pedagogy, and it was created in 1972 by the tripartite agreement of the Imperial Government, UNESCO, and UNDP and started actual work in the following year under the auspices of the Ministry of Education and Fine Arts. Its general objective was to train multi-purpose primary education professionals capable of adopting primary education to rural life and rural development. Its specific objectives were to train primary school teacher trainers, supervisors, educational leaders, adult education organizers and community development agents.

Soon after its beginning, however, the program only focused on offering pedagogics as a major area of study and Amharic, English, Geography and Mathematics as minor courses. Later, diploma programs were introduced when in 1996 the diploma offering departments were raised to degree level. All in all the college provided instructors to the different levels of the education sector through its regular and extension programs.

The two institutions were integrated into Bahir Dar University following the Council of Ministers regulation no. 60/1999. The university was inaugurated on May 6, 2000, and the Polytechnic Institute and the Teachers College became the Faculty of Engineering and Faculty of Education, respectively. In addition, the university added two more faculties, that of Business and Economics and the faculty of Law, which were established in 2001 and 2003 respectively. Bahir Dar University was officially inaugurated in May 2001.

The university is one of the largest institutions in Ethiopia, it is home to 52,830 students, dispatched in 104 undergraduates disciplines, 176 masters and 86 PhD programs.

== Enrollment ==
The university projects an enrollment of over 53,000 students in the academic year beginning in October 2015. As of 2016, the university enrolled 52,830 students.

== Academics ==
Bahir Dar University is organized into Faculty, Colleges, Institutes, Schools, and Academy.

== Institutes ==
- Bahir Dar Institute of Technology,
- Ethiopian Institutes of Textile and Fashion Technology
- Institute of Land Administration.

== Colleges ==
- College of Agriculture and Environment
- College of Medicine and Health Sciences
- College of Business and Economics
- College of Natural sciences.

== Academics ==
- Maritime Academy and Sport Academy.

== Schools ==
- School of Law, School of Earth Sciences
- School of Computing and Electrical Engineering
- School of Civil and Water Resources Engineering
- School of Mechanical and Industrial Engineering
- School of Chemical and Food Engineering.

== Faculties ==
- Faculty of Computing
- Educational and Behavioural Sciences (the oldest)
- Faculty of Humanities
- Faculty of Social Sciences.

== Programmes ==
Besides the disciplines already listed, Bahir Dar also has an institute of Textile and Garment and Maritime Academy, the only ones in Ethiopia, as well as College Agriculture and Environmental Sciences. Moreover, the university has started postgraduate programmes in the fields of mathematics, pedagogical science, Amharic, physics, media and communications. It has also started the Institute of Land Administration. There are currently plans to add other postgraduate fields of study.

The Engineering Faculty has the following departments: Automotive Engineering, Civil Engineering, Computer Science, Electrical Engineering, Chemical Engineering, Industrial Engineering, Mechanical Engineering, Electromechanical Engineering, Textile Engineering, water resources engineering and Food and biochemical technology departments. The university has BSc, MSc and PhD postgraduate programme in all fields. It is known by first Technical University in the Country.

The Land Administration Program of Bahir Dar University, started in 2008, is the first of its kind in Ethiopia. The themes of the program are: land law, land dispute resolution mechanisms, land valuation and compensation techniques, modern land measurement and registration, land certification and updating, cadastre and computer mapping, as well as land tenure studies. This demand-driven training program is to enable sustainable management of land resources through ensuring security of tenure among land holders.

== Memorandum of Understanding ==
- MOUs with Rajalakshmi Engineering College, Chennai, India.

== See also ==
- List of universities and colleges in Ethiopia
- Education in Ethiopia
