= Government of the Ethiopian Empire =

Imperial government from 1270 to 1974

Imperial government of Ethiopia
- Absolute monarchy (1270–1931); Unitary parliamentary constitutional monarchy (1931–1974)
- The Lion of Judah—emblem of the Ethiopian Empire
- Formation: 1270
- Extinction: 12 September 1974
- Country: Ethiopia; Eritrea

Legislative branch
- Legislature: None (rule by decree) (until 1931); Parliament

Executive branch
- Yekuno Amlak (first) (1270–1285): Emperor
- Haile Selassie (last) (1930–1974): Emperor
- Headquarters: National Palace, Addis Ababa, Ethiopian Empire (1930–1974); Menelik Palace, Addis Ababa (1889–1930); Yohannes IV Palace, Mekelle (1871–1889); Amba Mariam, Wollo Province (1855–1871); Fasil Ghebbi, Gondar (17th century – 1855); Remote residence (until 17th century)
- Main organ: Chamber of Senate and Chamber of Deputies (1955–1974)

The Government of the Ethiopian Empire was historically based on the framework of absolute monarchy with a feudal system, where religious legitimacy and the wealthier class were often prioritized. Societies were characterized by social inequality and opportunities for social mobility through military performance. There were famines, droughts and illegitimate land acquisition from peasants and landowners.

Under Emperor Menelik II, Ethiopia became a unitary and centralized state under a multiethnic empire with over 80 ethnic groups despite having Shewan Amhara dominance. Ethiopia was then modernized by Emperor Haile Selassie after his coronation in 1930, introducing two constitutions: one in 1931 and a revised version in 1955. The system was unitary and parliamentary, with the legislature divided into the Chamber of Senate and the Chamber of Deputies.

== 1270–1931 ==
Historically, the northern Ethiopian plateau used an authoritarian fashion; their rulers infused religious legitimacy (the Orthodox Church) and their wealth derived from agricultural production. The societies were hierarchically stratified, featuring social inequality and opportunities for social mobility through successful military performance. Land always has been the most valuable resource, and acquisition became the main driving force behind imperialism, especially during the reign of Menelik II.

Feudalism was a predominant sociopolitical and economic order in Ethiopia for many years. In this system, society was classified by wealth, especially land acquisition, where landlords own large amounts of land. In a modern sense, the landlords were capitalist farmers, and the landless class was growing. Famines may surge in this process. Under Menelik's Expansions (1878–1904), Ethiopia became a multiethnic empire with shared states. Menelik formed a more centralized government within a delimited boundary by the 1900s.

Amharic became the central language of the Empire until the 20th-century reforms of Haile Selassie. Shewan Amhara's dominance starting from the 19th century has been viewed by other prominent ethnic groups like Tigrayans and Oromos as oppressive, characterized by mass forced land acquisition. The emperor also had the right to direct and create a professional and salaried army. Traditionally, the Ethiopian soldiers were provided by regional lords in times of war. These soldiers were not paid but had to live with what they could acquire from the local population during military campaigns. He further pushed for a centralized command government and initiated paying a salary to the soldiers.

In few years after the coronation in 1930, Emperor Haile Selassie took an initiative that replaced traditional, decentralized governance and began modernizing the country.

== 1930–1974 ==
=== 1931 constitution ===
The 1930 Constitution of the Ethiopian Empire vested executive legislature to the Chamber of Senate and Chamber of Deputies in the imperial promulgation. These chambers had no members in the revisited 1956 Constitution—shall meet at the beginning and end of each session, on some occasions upon the emperor's call. The President of the Chamber shall preside over all joint meetings. The Imperial Parliament of Ethiopia (Amharic: የኢትዮጵያ ንጉሠ ነገሥት ፓርላማ) was the bicameral legislature of the Ethiopian Empire from 1931 to 1974. It consisted of the lower house, the Chamber of Deputies, and the upper house, the Senate. The legislature was established in the 1931 Constitution, and all members were appointed, primarily by the Emperor of Ethiopia. The Ethiopian Parliament Building was the meeting place of the imperial parliament.

==== New government structure ====
The Constitution defined that the emperor constituted the Chamber of Senate (Yeheggue Mewossegna Meker Beth) and Chamber of Deputies (Yeheggue Memeriya Meker Beth).

Parliamentarian chambers
The command of imperial promulgation executed this law. In the parliamentary structure, the Senate consisted of one-half of the total Deputies (125), all pointed by the Emperor for six years terms (one-third of whom are renewed every two years. The Chamber of Deputies is composed of 250 members elected over four years.

Electoral system
Every natural citizen, typically aged 21, could participate in an electoral district for a candidate from whom the Chamber of Deputies may vote. Depriving of civil rights or imprisonment for criminal charges was disqualified.

To be elected a deputy, a person must become naturally Ethiopian citizen aged 25 who genuinely registered to the resident constituency. The person additionally required their personal property for qualifications by the electoral law, worsening 1,000 and personal property of 2,000. For districts that contained 200,000 inhabitants in the Ethiopian Empire, each section represented 2 Deputies, and for the towns with 30,000 inhabitants, one Deputy was delegated, whereas for 50,000 inhabitants, for excess of 30,000.

Before the 1973 general election, Emperor Haile Selassie, with ultimate power in the legislature, had proposed a bill for the taxation of land and certain tenant rights. The last elections took place then—the legislature was abolished shortly after due to the Derg coup.

Since 1931, Ethiopia has had its legislature, judiciary, and independent police force promulgated under Emperor Haile Selassie. The constitution instituted the Chamber of the Senate and the Chamber of Deputies, whose laws could be executed by imperial promulgation. The emperor had the right to decide forces and treaties and to confer titles to princes and other dignitaries.

=== 1955 constitution ===
The revisited 1955 constitution (or second Constitution) was promulgated on 4 November 1955, comprising 131 Articles. The Constitution introduced elections to the lower chamber. This Constitution was important to reduce the power of regional warlords and consolidate the imperial power. The two Constitution vested power to the Chamber of Senate (Yeheggue Mewossegna Meker Beth) and Chamber of Deputies (Yeheggue Memeriya Meker Beth). Under the 1955 constitution Article 56, no one can be simultaneously a member of the Chamber of Deputies or Senate, marking their meeting at the beginning or end of each session. The two chambers shall meet at the beginning or end of each session. Under the circumstances in Articles 90 and 91, on some occasions, upon the emperor's call, the President of the Chamber shall preside at all joint meetings of the Chambers. Elections of Chambers of Deputies members run on the normal expiry date of their term of office.

=== Senate ===
The Senate, Yaheg Mawos sena Meker-beth, was established in 1931. Initially, its members were appointed, and they came from the nobility, the aristocracy, cabinet ministers, and civil servants. The chamber was reformed in the 1955 constitution so that aristocrats appointed the members. In 1974, there were 125 members in the chamber.

=== Chamber of Deputies ===
The Chamber of Deputies, Yaheg Mamria Meker-beth, was established in 1931. Initially, the members were chosen by the Emperor of Ethiopia, the nobility and the aristocrats. The 1955 constitution reformed the chamber, and members were to be elected. In 1974, there were 250 members in the chamber.

== See also ==
- List of legislatures by country
