= Legislative session of Ethiopia =

In Ethiopia's legislative system, the parliamentary session takes place with regular meetings of parliamentarian on Tuesdays and Thursdays, standing committee tasks. Extraordinary and special meetings called by the speaker. The regular meeting attended by the prime minister broadcast on national television. The period is when the member of parliaments expected to appear formally and usually wear suit or traditional attire.

Live or replayed broadcast of the session typically begins two days per week. Many officials discontented with the session. For instance, in October 2012, Abay Tsehaye, a senior official of TPLF commented that the "parliament’s program on Ethiopian Television is the least attractive."

== Imperial parliament (1931–1974) ==
The Chamber of Senate internal regulation of the 1931 Imperial parliament also slightly similar but different in dress codes for the Speaker of the House and guards of the parliament. At the first day of the Senate meeting, the members take an oath in front of the emperor, giving gratitude of His Majesty in contest of the emperor or the president of the Senate. The Senate meeting takes place from 10 a.m. to 1 p.m, throughout week, except for weekends or holidays.

The Emperor Haile Selassie delivered opening speech towards the two chambers while the MPs should stand until he finishes the speech. The duration of lengthy speech of Selassie would exhaust some of MPs, leading to lose consciousness. The ritual has been removed when Prince Aserate Kassa advised the emperor of their fainting. Article 21 of the regulation stipulated the duration of speech that "a member who wants to speak shall stand and apply of the president. He may not speak until the president follows him to do so." Once the speech is in motion, "the President shall stop the speech of a member when it becomes no longer relevant to the subject being discussed". This furtherly elaborated the voting, meetings and president's/vice president's communication with the emperor.

== FDRE parliamentary (1995–present) ==
Since 1995, both the House of People's Representatives (HoPR) and the House of Federation (HoF) members wear black suit and sometimes traditional attire followed by the playing of national anthem, oath-taking ceremony according to the constitution and opening speech by the president. After that, the Speaker of both houses elects the speaker, deputy speaker and the naming’ of the prime minister once in a five years.

The meeting takes place in the first Monday of the first month of the year, i.e. in the September of the Ethiopian New Year. While the parliamentary setting varies, the dress code, meeting halls and the seating placements are all predetermined. Regular meetings take place on Tuesdays and Thursdays from 09:00 to 12:00 a.m and if agenda not finalized, it would be on 2:30 to 5:00 pm. During session, members who would like to intervene speeches to ask question should first request the Speaker and the members.

== Current session ==
6th Ethiopian Parliament

Overview
- Legislative body: Federal Parliamentary Assembly
- Meeting place: Ethiopian Parliament Building, Addis Ababa
- Term: 4 October 2021 – 2026
- Election: 2021
- Opposition: NaMa; EZEMA; GPDO
- Website: www.hopr.gov.et
