= Federal Parliamentary Assembly =

Legislative body of Ethiopia

Federal Parliamentary Assembly የፌዴራል ፓርላማ ምክር ቤት

Type
- Type: Bicameral
- Houses: House of Federation (upper house); House of Peoples' Representatives (lower house)

History
- Founded: 1995
- Preceded by: Council of Representatives

Leadership
- Speaker of the House of Federation: Agegnehu Teshager, Prosperity Party since 4 October 2021
- Speaker of the House of Peoples' Representatives: Tagesse Chafo, Prosperity Party since 18 October 2018
- Seats: 659

Meeting place
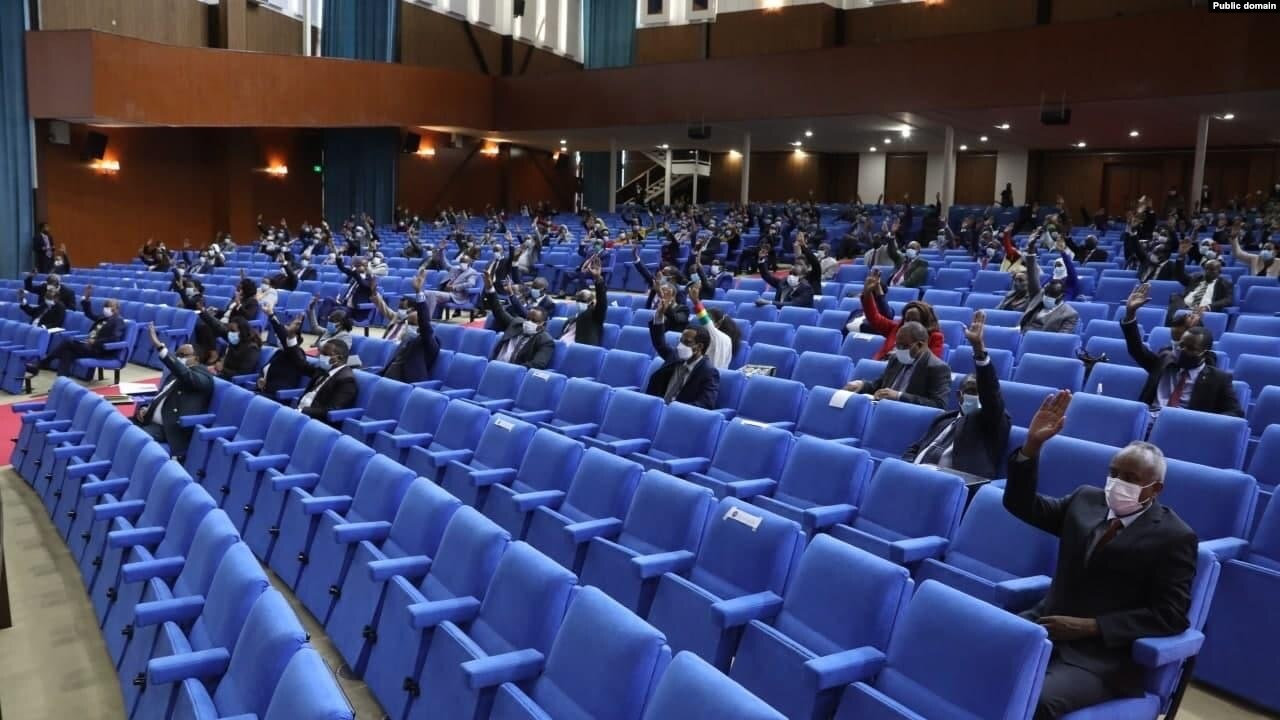
- Ethiopian Parliament Building, Addis Ababa, Ethiopia; 9.0301235°N 38.7623748°E

Website
- House of People's Representatives; House of Federation

The Federal Parliamentary Assembly (Amharic: የፌዴራል ፓርላማ ምክር ቤት, romanized: Ye-Fēdēralawī Parilama Mikir Bēt) is the federal legislature of Ethiopia. It consists of two chambers:

- House of Federation with 112 members that are elected by indirect election.
- The House of Peoples' Representatives with 547 members that are elected by first past the post.

Created with the adoption of the Ethiopian Constitution of 1995, the Parliament replaced the National Shengo as the legislative branch of the Ethiopian government.

== History ==
=== Under the 1931 constitution ===
The Imperial Parliament of Ethiopia was first convened by Emperor Haile Selassie in 1931, although it was largely an advisory and feudal body, and was consolidated under the 1931 constitution. The bi-cameral, equal-numbered parliament consisted of the upper Senate (composed largely of nobility, the aristocracy, ministers, Distinguished Veterans and military commanders) and the lower Chamber of Deputies (constituting members chosen by the Emperor, the nobility and the aristocrats).

It was interrupted by the Italian invasion in 1936, and did not meet again until after 1941. By 1955, elders in the districts largely elected the landed aristocrats to the Senate.

=== Under the 1955 constitution ===
The 1955 constitution introduced new arrangements to the parliament, including the election of members to the Chamber of Deputies as well as the growth of the lower house to 250 members as opposed to the 125 members of the Senate by 1974. However, deputies largely consisted of feudal lords, rich merchants and high-level members of the civil service. Real power remained in the hands of the Emperor. The parliament would meet in five sessions from 1955 to 1974.

=== Under the Derg and PDRE ===
When the monarchy was overthrown, parliament was replaced with a transitional assembly of 60 select members from government institutions and provinces from 1974 to 1975, after which the government largely operated by decree through the military junta headed by Mengistu Haile Mariam. The period without some semblance of a legislature ended in 1987, when the People's Democratic Republic of Ethiopia was established under a new constitution drafted by Mengistu and the Workers' Party of Ethiopia (WPE).

The new Constitution established an 835-member legislature, the National Shengo (National Council), as the highest organ of state power. Its members were elected to five-year terms. Executive power was vested in a president, elected by the Shengo for a five-year term, and a cabinet also appointed by the Shengo. The president was chairman of the Council of State, which acted for the legislature between sessions. Actual power, however, rested in the WPE (and particularly with Mengistu), defined as the leading force of state and society. The National Shengo, while nominally vested with great lawmaking powers, actually did little more than rubber-stamp decisions made by Mengistu and the WPE.

=== Under the FDRE ===
Following Mengistu's overthrow in 1991, the Shengo was abolished, and a period of transition lasted until 1995, when a new legislature was inaugurated under the new constitution.

== See also ==
- Politics of Ethiopia
- List of legislatures by country
