= Aklilu Habte-Wold =

Prime Minister of Ethiopia from 1961 to 1974

- አክሊሉ ሀብተ ወልድ
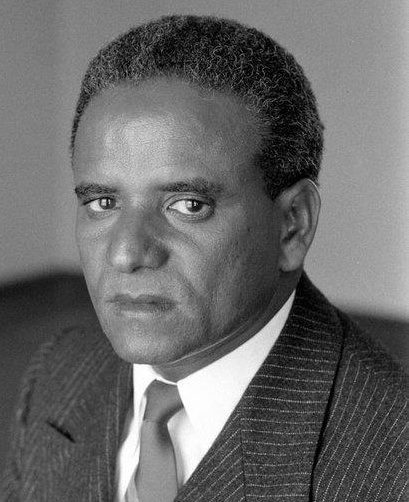
- Aklilu in 1961

Prime Minister of Ethiopia
- In office 17 April 1961 – 27 February 1974
- Monarch: Haile Selassie I
- Preceded by: Abebe Aregai
- Succeeded by: Endelkachew Makonnen

Minister of Foreign Affairs
- In office 1943 – November 1957
- Monarch: Haile Selassie I
- Prime Minister: Makonnen Endelkachew Abebe Aregai
- Preceded by: Ephrem Teweldemedhin
- Succeeded by: Ambaye Wolde Mariam

Member of Parliament for the Chamber of Deputies
- In office 17 April 1961 – 1 March 1974
- Monarch: Haile Selassie I
- Prime Minister: Himself
- Preceded by: Abebe Aregai
- Succeeded by: Endelkachew Makonnen

Personal details
- Born: 12 March 1912 Adda, Shewa Province, Ethiopian Empire
- Died: 24 November 1974 (aged 62) Akaki Central Prison, Addis Ababa, Ethiopia
- Party: Independent
- Spouse: Colette Valade
- Education: Paris-Sorbonne University (L.L.B., Doctorat en Droit Public, Doctorat en Économie)
- Portfolio: Minister of the Pen

Tsehafi Taezaz Aklilu Habte-Wold (Amharic: አክሊሉ ሀብተ ወልድ; 12 March 1912 – 23 November 1974) was an Ethiopian statesman and politician who served as Prime Minister of Ethiopia during the reign of Emperor Haile Selassie I from 1961 to 1974 until his resignation due to the civil and military unrest brought by the student youth uprising and internal pressures of the soon to come military junta. He previously served as foreign minister before his premiership from 1943 to 1958. He was described leading the position of "Minister of the Pen" an ex-officio title due to his role as prime minister and handling all the practical leadership roles in the Ethiopian Empire.

Aklilu studied at Paris-Sorbonne University from 1931 to 1936, where he obtained a Licence en Droit, a Diplôme de Doctorat en Droit Public, a Diplôme de Doctorat en Economie, a Certificat d'Etudes Supérieures Commerciales, and a Certificate in Political Science. Later following the end of the Italian invasion of Ethiopia thus prompting his return to Ethiopia. He was appointed foreign minister by Emperor Haile Selassie I to serve under then Prime Minister Makonnen Endelkachew later Prime Minister Abebe Aregai who was assassinated in the failed 1960 coup later replacing him as Prime Minister officially in 1961 following Ethiopia's first election during the 1961 Ethiopian general election implemented from the new 1955 Constitution. As foreign minister Aklilu signed the charter of the United Nations making Ethiopia one of the only independent African states who founded the institute.

He led the efforts of building Ethiopian diplomacy during his time as the foreign minister and repairing the relations between post-fascism led Italy. Ethiopia's was placed in the global sphere as a politically neutral state, in the pre-Non-Aligned Movement era, towards the United States, the Soviet Union, and other aligned countries while still fostering relations between aligned nations.

After becoming Prime Minister due to the death of his predecessor he becomes the first non-feudal and democratically elected person from a poor background later educated who became prime minister and thus serving the second highest office in the land. During his first term passing on to his next term after winning the 1965 general election he imposed a highly unpopular tax policy (head tax) a revolt started nonetheless the long-fought Somali backed terrorist Bale revolt from 1963 to 1970 through the support of the United States and United Kingdom was ultimately stopped. After winning his third and last term following his election victory in the 1969 general election having the highest turnout of about 3.4 million voters following his previous election shifted the monarch as the leader who mainly represented Ethiopia out of country while he handled economic policy and domestic and legislative affairs in parliament and the country as a whole. He failed numerous times to implement land reform and couldn't secure enough parliamentary votes for his efforts to redistribute feudal-owned land to the broader population.

Following the 1973 oil crisis and the student revolts, Aklilu resigned as prime minister. He was replaced by Endelkachew Makonnen, but were later both executed without due process or any judicial trial by the military junta in 1974, known as the Massacre of the Sixty or Black Saturday. He died at the age of 62.

Aklilu is often praised by later Ethiopian diplomats for his for front diplomacy as foreign minister and his transition of an aristocratic society to a transitional semi-democratic landscape.

== Life ==
Education in France

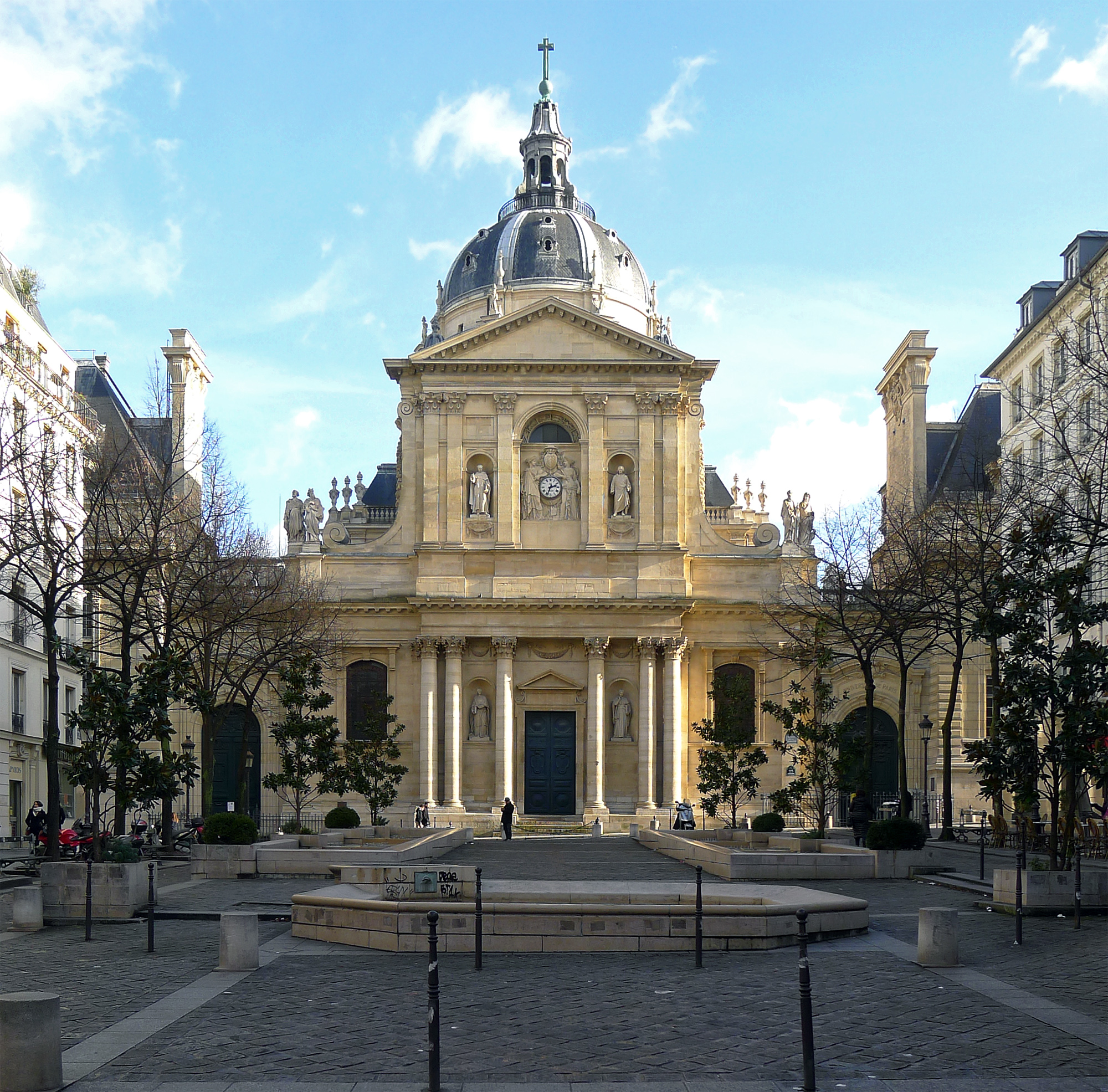
2015 photograph of Sorbonne University which replaced Paris-Sorbonne University

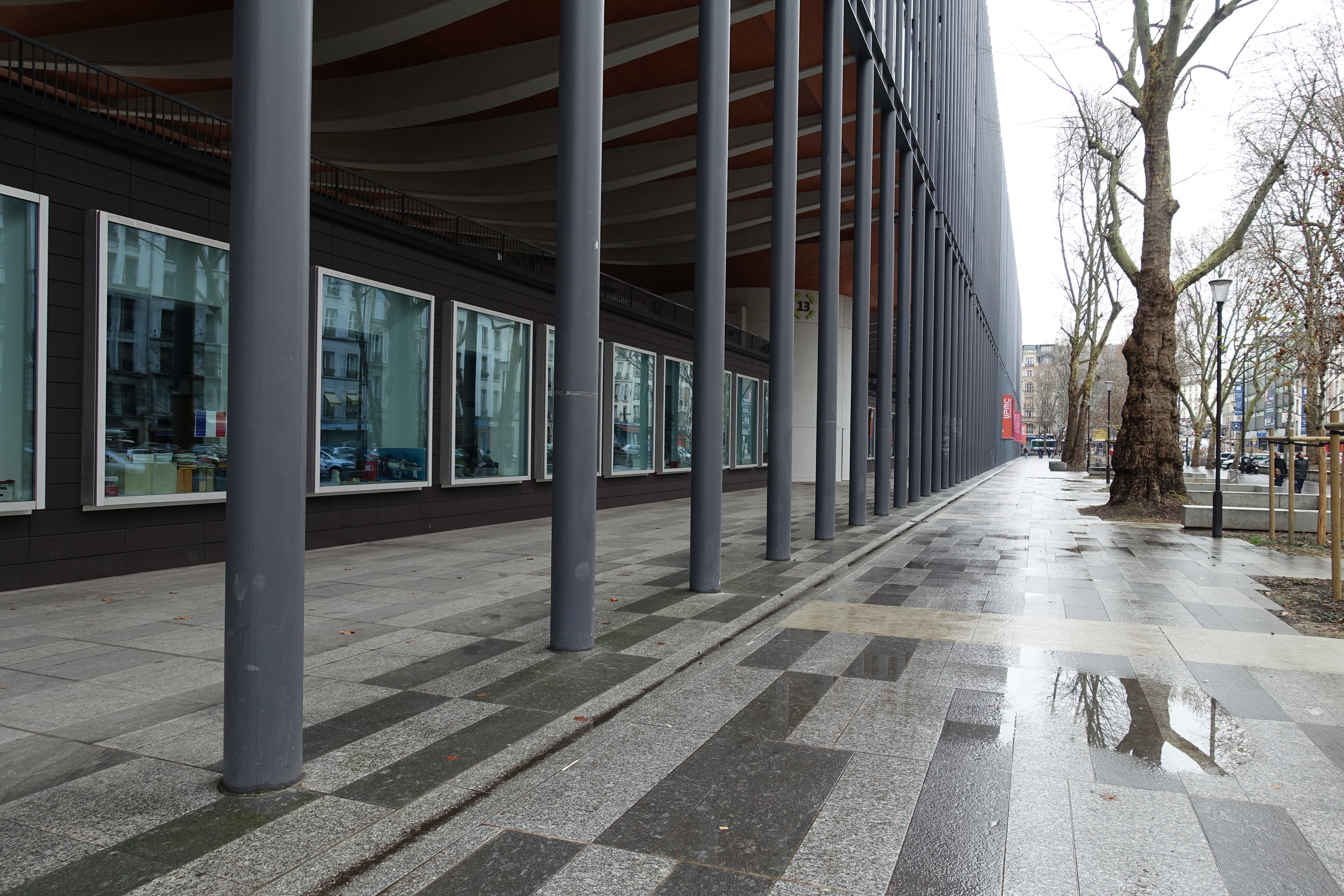
View of the modern landscape of the University in 2016

Aklilu studied before the modern system of French universities was introduced

Aklilu Habte-Wold was the youngest son of Aleqa Habtawald Habtenah, a clergyman at Qeddus Raguyel church in Addis Ababa, and wayzaro Yadagdegu Felfelu; both parents were originally from Bulga in Shewa Province. He and his brothers, Makonnen Habte-Wold and Akalework Habte-Wold benefited from the patronage of Emperor Haile Selassie, who had them educated. Aklilu Habte-Wold attended the French lycée in Alexandria from 1925, graduating in 1931, then proceeded to Paris to study at the Sorbonne.

Upon returning to Ethiopia, Aklilu became the protégé of the powerful Tsehafi Taezaz ("Minister of the Pen") Wolde Giyorgis Wolde Yohannes, another man of humble birth, who had become a powerful figure in Ethiopian government, and a close advisor to the Emperor, with his appointment as Tsehafi Taezaz. Wolde Giyorgis recommended the sons of Habte-Wold to the Emperor, who promoted them through the ranks so that the two eldest, Makonnen and Aklilu, became particularly influential with the monarch. Their humble origins, and the fact that they owed their education and advancement solely to the Emperor, allowed Emperor Haile Selassie to trust them implicitly and to favor them and other commoners of humble origin in government appointments and high positions at the expense of the aristocracy, whose loyalty to his person, rather than to the institution of Emperor he suspected. The Emperor's preference for such men as Aklilu Habte-Wold over the high nobles created resentment among the aristocracy, who believed they were being displaced by these new western educated "technocrats".

== Foreign Minister ==
=== Post War ===
==== Deputy Minister of Foreign Affairs ====
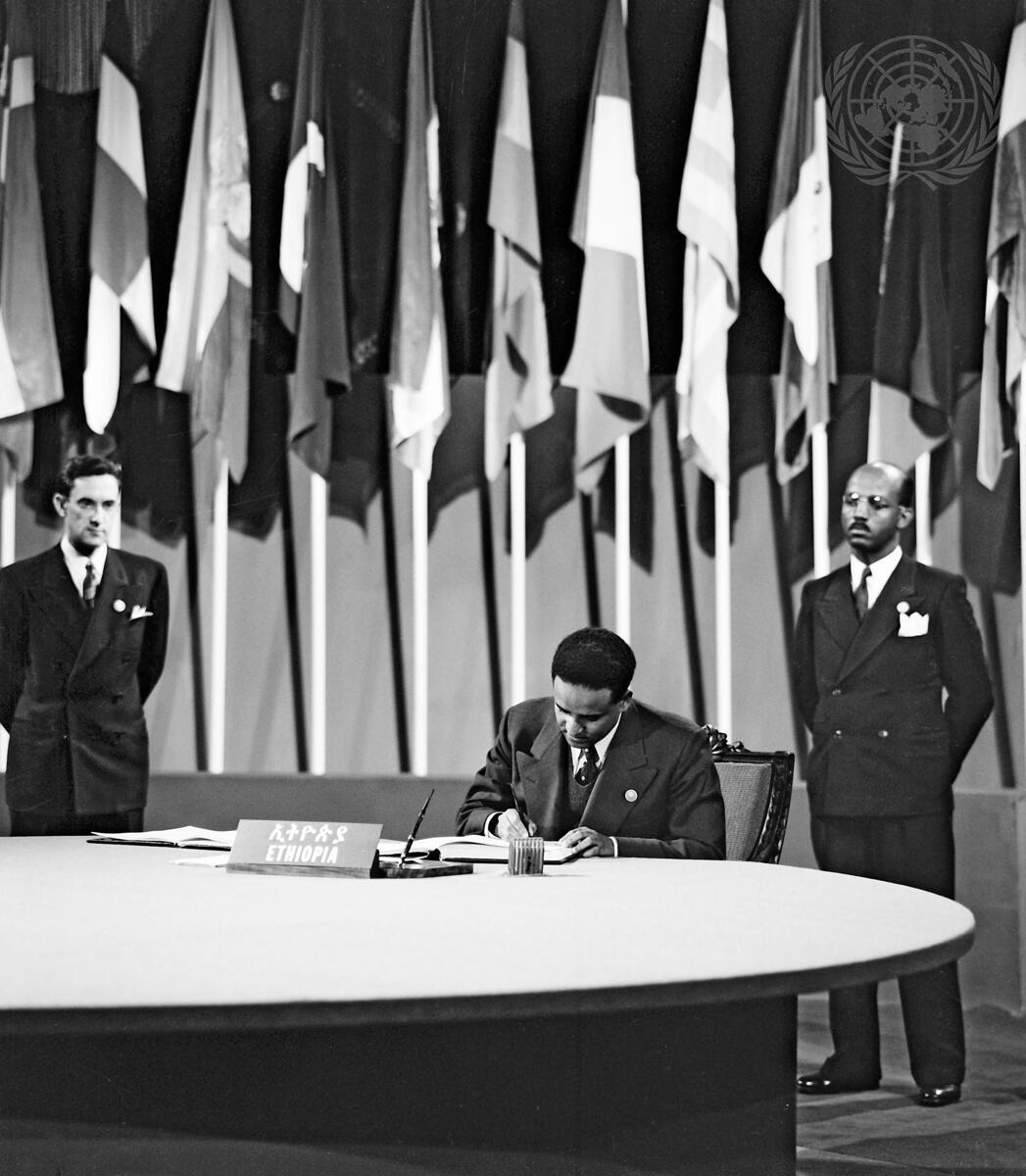
Aklilu signing the United Nations Charter on 26 June 1945

Having graduated from the Sorbonne in 1936, Aklilu began his career as Press Attaché at the Ethiopian Legation in Paris and was subsequently promoted to Secretary before becoming chargé d'affaires. When Ethiopia was defeated in the Second Italo-Abyssinian War, Aklilu Habte-Wold was in France with his brother Makonnen; upon the defection of the head of the Ethiopian legation to France, Blatengeta Wolde Mariyam Ayele, Aklilu was made chargé d'affaires. Aklilu lived in Paris and married a French woman, Collette Valade. With the fall of Paris in June 1940, Aklilu managed to escape on a forged passport, and with the help of the Portuguese Minister of Foreign Affairs he was able to reach Cairo. Following the restoration in 1941, Aklilu served for two years as Vice-Minister in the Ministry of the Pen before being appointed to head the Ministry of Foreign Affairs in October 1943. He subsequently served as a representative to the Paris Peace Conference after the end of World War II. During this time, Aklilu played a key role in the complex process that brought Eritrea into federation with Ethiopia after the newly created United Nations was formed, while he was the ambassador representing Ethiopia to the UN.

=== Foreign Minister ===
==== Eritrea ====
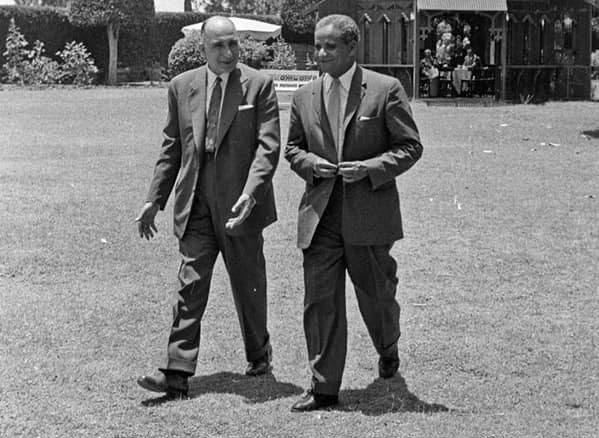
Aklilu in Egypt during a working visit in 1959

After serving as chargé d'affaires and then as Vice-Minister in the Ministry of the Pen, Aklilu was appointed to head the Ministry of Foreign Affairs under Prime Minister Ras Makonnen Endelkachew in October 1943, initially serving as Vice-Minister for the first six years before becoming full Minister, until November 1957 where he successfully federated the former colony of Eritrea towards Ethiopia. Managing the extraction of British soldiers from Eritrea and the handover of practical administration towards the Ethiopian government. Formally this happened when the newly formed United Nations under a unanimous voted for Eritrea reunification to Ethiopia after Emperor Menelik II's deposal of former Ethiopian territory towards Italy. In 1955 he gave a speech to the United Nations on the 10th general assembly in New York in French where he stated his belief that although Ethiopia would "modestly" contribute to the organization and endeavor of peace it will still play a vital and fundamental role in its overall mission.

Aklilu personally opposed the dissolution of the federation when the Eritrean National Assembly voted to dissolve it in November 1962, making Eritrea a province of Ethiopia. In the second half of the 1960s, however, when his chief rival in Ethiopian politics, ras Asrate Kassa, served as governor of Eritrea, Aklilu supported a firm line against Eritrean separatists.

==== United Kingdom ====
In 1944 he was able to negotiate the replacement of the 1942 Anglo-Ethiopian agreement with the British government placed in after the defeat of the Italians in 1941. And the relocation of the National Bank of Ethiopia from London, England to the capital, Addis Ababa. Aklilu came to an agreement with the British colonial government creating boundaries with Ethiopia and Kenya officially in 1947.

==== United States ====
On May 29 of 1954 Aklilu accompanied with other senior Ethiopian government officials visited the White House where he met with U.S president Dwight D. Eisenhower in the particular interests of getting loans and U.S backed financing for the local Ethiopian economy and American investment. The only task was U.S approval from the Congress since Ethiopia's 1931 constitution didn't practically give any powers to the legislatures as the 1955 constitution which drastically reduced the Emperor's power and the chief executive ministers. He went to Princeton University where he visited the Ivy university with senior officials of the cabinet.

==== France ====
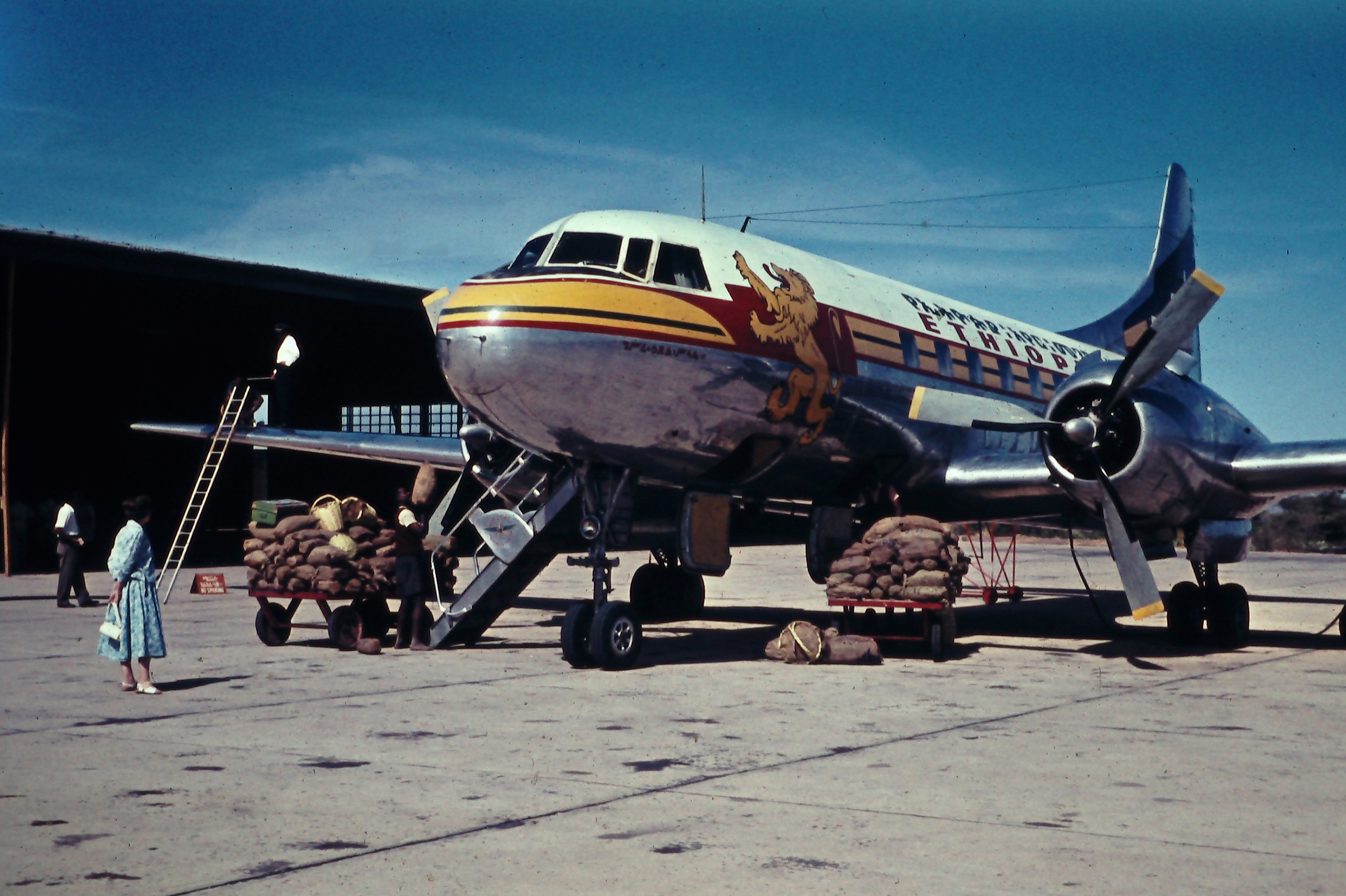
The vital agreement Aklilu signed created Ethiopian Airlines

He signed under the behalf of Prime Minister Makonnen Endelkachew with the TWA an agreement which created the now multibillion dollar company, Ethiopian Airlines in 1945. In 1946 with France, he was able to get a deal in regard to the end of pure French control between the Ethiopia-Djibouti railway towards a jointly operated rail. He attended the Paris Peace conference were participated in regard to the war crimes committed in modern day Eritrea and Somalia during World War II by the Italians.

==== Others ====
He officially started diplomatic channels with the Soviet Union on 21 April 1943 during World War II. He met with the premier of the Soviet Union Nikita Khrushchev on an official state visit with Emperor Haile Selassie I on the 1959 trip in Moscow. Aklilu also visited Cairo, Egypt where he met with various Egyptian officials including then Foreign Minister later Vice President Mahmoud Fawzi.

In 1956, Aklilu served as a member of the Committee of Five on the Suez Canal crisis, providing diplomatic service in London and Cairo on behalf of Ethiopia.

== Prime Minister of Ethiopia (1961-1974) ==
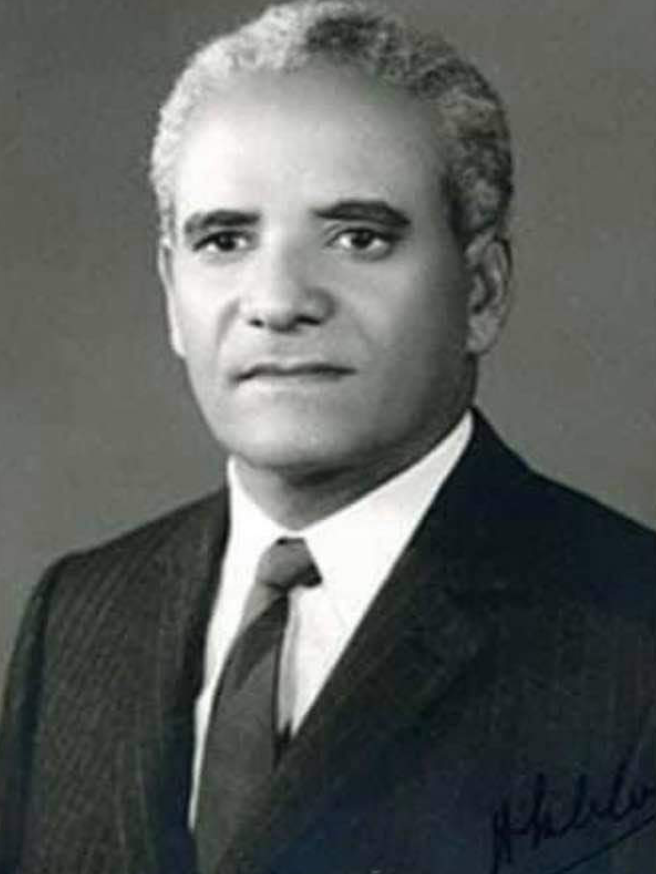
Aklilu during his Premiership

=== First Term (1961-1965) ===
Following the fall from favor of Tsehafi Taezaz Wolde Giyorgis in 1958, the Emperor appointed Aklilu to replace him as Tsehafi Taezaz. In April 1961, four months after the previous prime minister Abebe Aragai had been killed in a failed coup, the office of prime minister was vacant, following the 1961 Ethiopian general election and Aklilu's victory as the newly elected prime minister, this prompted the Emperor to give him the office of Tshehafi Taezaz while being prime minister giving him Tsehafi Taezaz in his portfolio. These two posts gave Aklilu a level of confidence with the Emperor that no one outside of the Imperial Family shared.

==== Government factions ====
His election, and the following increase of commoner "technocrats" in positions of power and influence greatly disturbed the more conservative elements in the Imperial Family, the aristocracy, and the Ethiopian Church. Two camps evolved at court, with Prime Minister Aklilu and his fellow non-noble "technocrats" on one side, who dominated the various ministries and the Imperial Cabinet, against the nobility who were represented by the Crown Council, and led by Ras Asrate Medhin Kassa. Although the Emperor forbade party politics, the two rival camps behaved as such, and maneuvered against each other rather vigorously. Many issues such as land reform and constitutional change were blocked largely because of this rivalry.

In 1961, early in his first term, Aklilu submitted to the Emperor a set of reform proposals covering constitutional and judicial reform, land redistribution, and new legislation on local administration, the civil service, pensions, and employer-employee relations. Some of these proposals materialized during his time in office, though land reform remained blocked by aristocratic resistance. In 1963 he played a leading role in drafting the charter of the Organisation of African Unity and its establishment on 25 May of that year. At the African Heads of State summit in Cairo in August 1964, he proposed Addis Ababa as the seat of the organization's headquarters, a proposal that was accepted.

On the other hand, Bahru Zewde is of the opinion that "Aklilu's impact on Ethiopian politics is not so easily identifiable. He lacked the capacity for political manipulation shown by his predecessor as tsahafe t'ezaz, Walda-Giyorgis, and his own brother, Makonnen. Aklilu was more of a leading functionary than a power-broker." Former diplomat Paul B. Henze supports this view that Aklilu was not interested in reform, but repeats Aklilu's rival Ras Asrate's opinion that "Aklilu was the primary reactionary influence on the Emperor." On the other hand, John Spencer, who knew Aklilu personally, described him as "a remarkably clear and logical thinker and a formidable antagonist in encounters with foreign representatives." Spencer further explains that Aklilu's ability was limited due, to the favoritism Emperor Haile Selassie showed him, which led to resentment and isolation from his compatriots. "In that isolation his power and stature declined in direct ratio to that of His Majesty," Spencer notes, concluding that with his brother Makonnen's death in the 1960 Ethiopian coup attempt, he lost a vital window into the psychological reactions and secret movements of his peers.

=== 1974 revolution ===
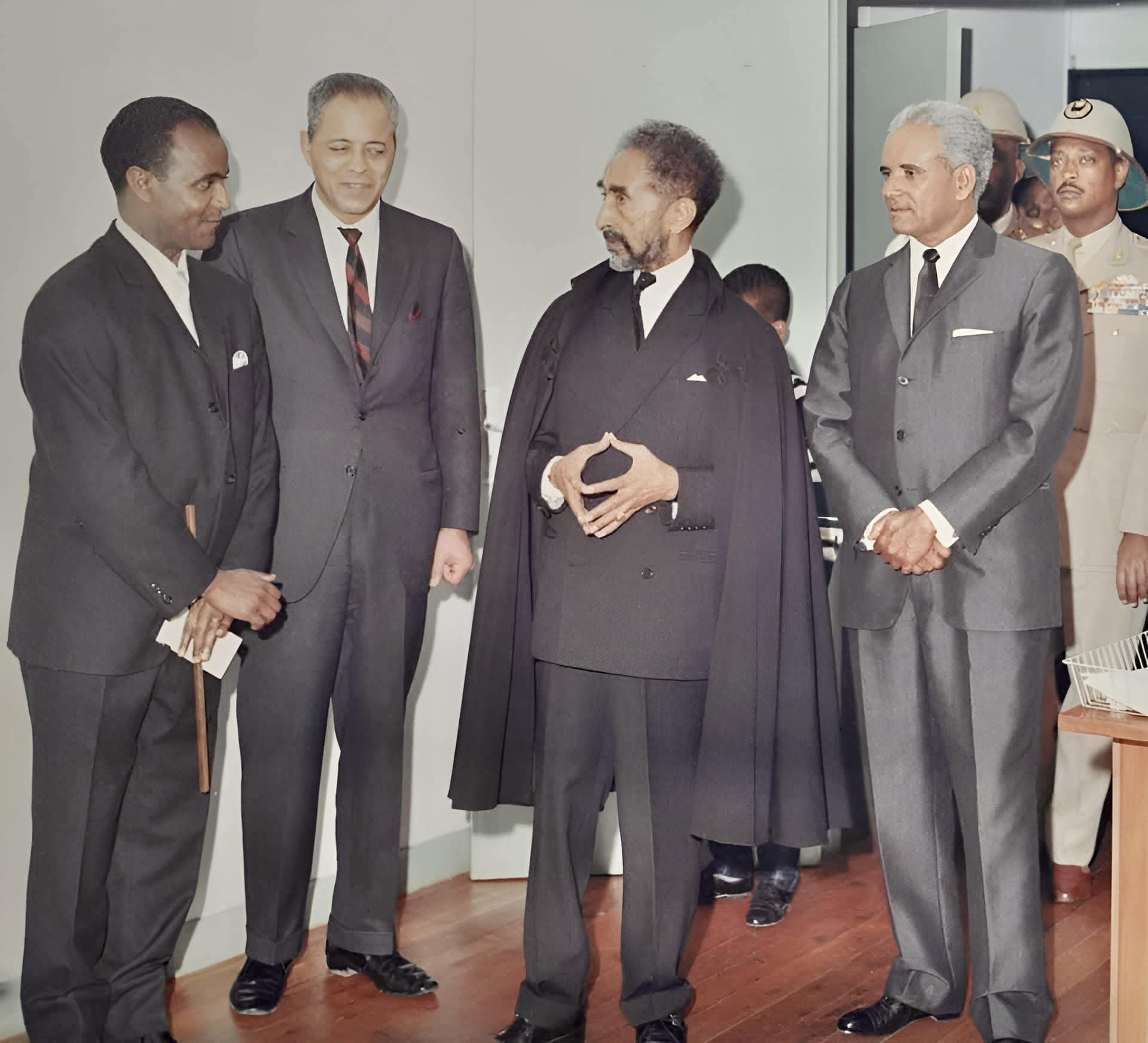
Aklilu with Ambassador Zewde (left), Dr. Haile (farthest left) and Emperor Haile Selassie I (center)

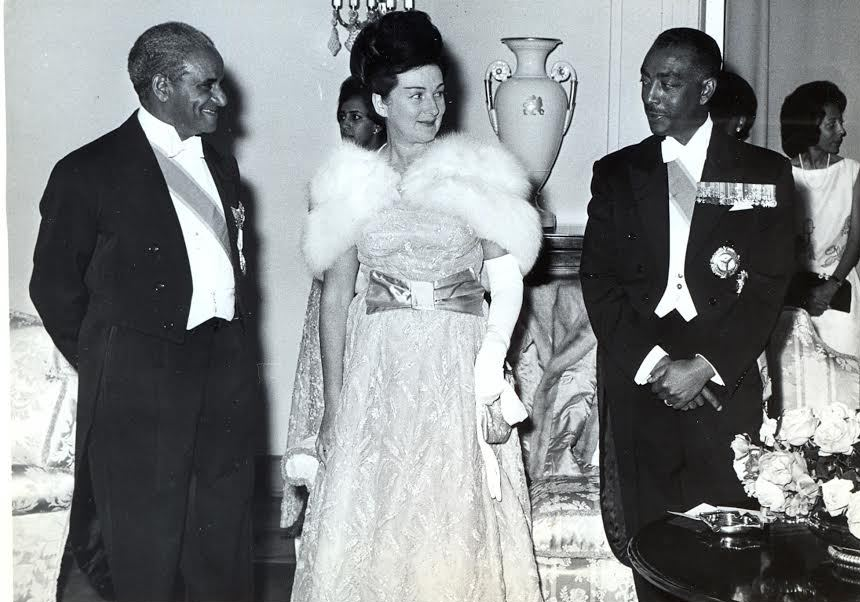
Aklilu in 1967 with his French wife and Minister of Defence Abiye Abebe

When student protests, military mutinies and an economic downturn caused by the oil embargo erupted in 1973 into a popular uprising against the government, calls went out for Prime Minister Aklilu to be dismissed. On 23 February, then the next day, the Emperor made a number of concessions to the various groups of protesters. Aklilu resigned on 27 February 1974 together with the members of his cabinet.

Meanwhile, Aklilu had grown frustrated and weary of holding a position with much responsibility but no authority. John Spencer offers one example, only a few months prior to this crisis, of Aklilu's loss of power:

In foreign affairs where, for decades, his views were uncontested, he was now confronted by Minister of Foreign Affairs Minassie Haile, who did not share his views on foreign policy. For Minassie, it was sufficient to go to His Majesty to obtain a compliant authorization of an opposite line of action. A case in point ... was whether or not the Emperor should make an urgent visit to Riyadh to consult with King Faisal. Ill-advisedly, Aklilou accepted a show-down in front of His Majesty. Aklilou lost. Without a constituency, with only a vacillating monarch to turn to, Aklilou expressed to me his concern for the future.

By the time of the popular uprising, Aklilu Habte-Wold had resolved to resign, a decision opposed by Lt. General Abiye Abebe and Leul Ras Asrate Kassa. Both criticized him for abandoning the government without first having safeguarded authority, law and order in this situation. Nevertheless, Aklilu persisted in his decision, although he recommended Lt. General Abiye be his successor; however when he resigned it was Endelkachew Makonnen who became the new prime minister. Aklilu's resignation, instead of placating the protesters, this resignation only emboldened them to make further demands. He was held as a political prisoner from 26 April 1974. While in detention, he was summoned before the Derg's Commission of Inquiry, to which he submitted a written report on 17 September 1974 recounting his record in government.

The Crown Council had pushed the Emperor to appoint a nobleman to the position, and initially Lt. General Abiye Abebe was favored to be named the new prime minister. However and when General Abiye's request that he be made responsible to the elected parliament rather than the Emperor was presented, the Council balked and the General asked to be dropped from consideration. Lij Endelkachew Makonnen, son of the late former prime minister, was appointed. The new Premier attempted to address the many demands being put forward by the proponents of reform, and Ethiopia seemed to be on the verge of transforming itself into a democracy and a modern constitutional monarchy. However, a committee of low ranking officers called the Derg, who had been empowered to investigate corruption in the military, arrested Tsehafi Taezaz Aklilu and most of the men who had served in his cabinet, as well as the new prime minister and his cabinet. The Derg deposed Emperor Haile Selassie on 12 September 1974 and assumed power as the Marxist military junta that would rule the country for almost two decades.

On the evening of 24 November, Tsehafi Taezaz Aklilu Habte-Wold and his brother Akalework Habte-Wold were removed from Akaki Central Prison and executed without trial alongside 59 other civil and military officials of Haile Selassie's government, seven line officers, and a private. This act led to protests around the world, not only from Europe and the United States, but also from a number of African countries who expressed their concern for the well-being of the deposed Emperor.
