= 1957 Ethiopian general election =

1 and 30 September 1957	1961 →
- All 210 seats in the Chamber of Deputies; 106 seats needed for a majority
Party	Vote %	Seats
Independents	100	210
This lists parties that won seats. See the complete results below.
Prime Minister before	Prime Minister after
Makonnen Endelkachew; Independent	Abebe Aregai; Independent

General elections were held in Ethiopia between 1 and 30 September 1957 to elect 210 members of the Chamber of Deputies, the lower house of the Ethiopian parliament (members of the upper house, the Senate, were appointed by the Emperor). These elections followed the new constitution which had been enacted by Emperor Haile Selassie in 1955, and were the first ever held in the country.

== Electoral system ==
The regulations for this election were set forth in Proclamation 152 of 1952. This law set up a Central Election Board of three members, which worked with the help of the Ethiopian Ministry of Interior. Each rural constituency of 200,000 eligible voters elected two members for the Chamber. Political parties were not authorized at this time, so competition for office were "reduced to the level of individual competition," according to Bahru Zewdu. "Given the attractive salary of deputies as well as the social status enjoyed by them, that competition was understandably keen. Parliament thus became a vehicle for self-promotion rather than a forum of popular representation."

Universal suffrage was introduced for everyone born in Ethiopia and over 21 in age. The prospective voter was required to have lived in their electoral district for at least one year, not be disqualified by insanity, loss of civil rights pursuant to the penal code law, or be incarcerated. Candidates had to meet specific property qualifications. According to Edmond Keller, "A candidate had to own at least E$ 850 in land in the constituency he proposed to represent, or he had to possess at least E$ 1,700 in moveable property." Along with the relatively expensive cost of campaigning greatly restricted the number of people who could run for office. As a result, a disproportionate number of candidates were from aristocratic families—26%, according to Edmond Keller.

Province	Constituencies
Wollo	12
Shoa	11
Gojjam	10
Eritrea	7
Wollega	6
Tigray	5
Addis Ababa	7
Illubabor	2
Kaffa	4
Arsi	4
Begemder	6
Gamu-Gofa	10
Hararghe	11
Source: Ethiopia Observer
