= Council of Representatives (Ethiopia) =

Unicameral legislature of the Transitional Government of Ethiopia from 1991 to 1995

Council of Representatives የኢትዮጵያ ተወካዮች ምክር ቤት
- Emblem of the Transitional Government of Ethiopia

Type
- Type: Unicameral

History
- Founded: 22 July 1991
- Disbanded: 21 August 1995
- Preceded by: National Shengo
- Succeeded by: Federal Parliamentary Assembly

Leadership
- Meles Zenawi, Ethiopian People's Revolutionary Democratic Front
- Tamrat Layne, Amhara National Democratic Movement
- Dawud Ibsa Ayana, Oromo Liberation Front
- Seats: 546

Elections
- Voting system: First-past-the-post
- Last election: 7–18 May 1995

Meeting place
- Ethiopian Parliament Building

Constitution
- Transitional charter

The Council of Representatives (Amharic: የኢትዮጵያ ተወካዮች ምክር ቤት) was the unicameral legislature of Ethiopia from 1991 under the Transitional Government of Ethiopia until 1995, when it would be replaced by the Federal Parliamentary Assembly.

According to Article 7 of the Transitional Government Charter, the Council has representatives from various national liberation movements, political figures and other organizations, which was composed of 87 members.

== Formation ==
On 22 July 1991, the representatives from the Ethiopian People’s Revolutionary Democratic Front (EPRDF), the Eritrean People’s Liberation Front (EPLF), and the Oromo Liberation Front (OLF) agreed to form the transitional charter of Ethiopia. According to the charter Article 7, the representatives were made of various political groups, mostly with national liberation movements and political figures, composed up to 87 total members. The Article 8 stipulated the Council of Representatives shall exercise and oversee the Council of Ministers as follows:

a. Draw-up its rules of procedure;

b. Election of its Chairperson, who shall also be the Head of State, under a Vice-Chairperson and Secretary, the Head of State shall appoint the Prime Minister, whose appointment shall be approved by the Council of Representatives. The head of state, the Prime Minister, the Vice-Chairperson and Secretary of the Council of Representatives shall be from different nations/nationalities;

c. Approve the Prime Minister's nomination of the members of Council of Ministers drawn-up on consider*-' lions of ascertaining a broad national representation, technical competence and unswerving adherence to the Charter;

d. Initiation and promulgation of proclamation and decrease pursuant to the Charter;

e. Adoption of national budget;

f. Provide for the administration of justice on the basis of the Charter; the Courts shall, in their work, be fee from any governmental interference with respect to items provided for in Part One, Article One of the Charter;

g. Establish the Constitutional Commission;

h. Ratify international agreements;

== Transitional Government Declaration ==
Part	Articles	Documentation	Ref.
Democratic Rights	Based on the Universal Declaration of Human Rights of the United Nations, adopted and proclaimed by the General Assembly by resolution 217 A(III) of 10 December 1948, individual human rights shall be respected fully, and without any limitation whatsoever. Particularly every individual shall have	"Based on the Universal Declaration of Human Rights of the United Nations, adopted and proclaimed by the General Assembly by resolution 217 A(III) of 10 December 1948, individual human rights shall be respected fully, and without any limitation whatsoever. Particularly every individual shall have: 1. The freedom of conscience, expression, association, and peaceable assembly; 2. The right to engage in unrestricted political activity and to organize political parties, provided the exercise of such right does not infringe upon the rights of others."	
Democratic Rights	The right of nations, nationalities, and peoples to self-determination is affirmed. To this end, each nation, nationality, and people is guaranteed the right to:	"The right of nations, nationalities, and peoples to self-determination is affirmed. To this end, each nation, nationality, and people is guaranteed the right to: 1. Preserve its identity and have it respected, promote its culture and history, and use and develop its language; 2. Administer its own affairs within its own defined territory and effectively participate in the central government on the basis of freedom and fair and proper representation; 3. Exercise its right to self-determination of independence, when the concerned nation/nationality and people [are] convinced that the above rights are denied, abridged, or abrogated . . . ."	
Structure and Composition of the Transitional Government	There shall be established a Transitional Government consisting of a Council of Representatives and a Council of Ministers	There shall be established a Transitional Government consisting of a Council of Representatives and a Council of Ministers.	
Structure and Composition of the Transitional Government	The Council of Representatives shall be composed of representatives of national liberation movements, other political organizations, and prominent individuals to make up a total of no more than 87 members	The Council of Representatives shall be composed of representatives of national liberation movements, other political organizations, and prominent individuals to make up a total of no more than 87 members.	
Structure and Composition of the Transitional Government	The Transitional Government shall exercise all legal and political responsibility for the governance of Ethiopia until it hands over power to a government popularly elected on the basis of a new Constitution	The Transitional Government shall exercise all legal and political responsibility for the governance of Ethiopia until it hands over power to a government popularly elected on the basis of a new Constitution.	
Structure and Composition of the Transitional Government	The Council of Representatives shall exercise legislative functions as follows and oversee the work of the Council of Ministers	The Council of Representatives shall exercise legislative functions as follows and oversee the work of the Council of Ministers: 1. Draw up its rules of procedures; 2. Election of its chairperson, who shall also be the head of state, and a vice-chairperson and secretary. The head of state shall appoint the prime minister, whose appointment shall be approved by the Council of Representatives. The head of state, the prime minister, the vice-chairperson, and secretary of the Council of Representatives shall be from different nations/nationalities; 3. Approve the prime minister’s nomination of the members of the Council of Ministers drawn up on consideration of ascertaining a broad national representation, technical competence, and unswerving adherence to the Charter; 4. Initiation and promulgation of proclamations and decrees pursuant to the Charter; 5. Adoption of a national budget; 6. Provide for the administration of justice on the basis of the Charter; the Courts shall, in their work, be free from any governmental interference with respect to items provided for in Part I, Article 1 of the Charter; 7. Establish the Constitutional Commission; 8. Ratify international agreements; 9. Create committees for defense and security policy during the transitional period; 10. Provide the mechanism to ascertain the fair and impartial application of the mass media; 11. Issue a just labor law that protects the rights and interests of the workers.	
Transitional Program	The Council of Representatives shall constitute the Constitutional Commission to draw up a draft Constitution.		
Transitional Program	Upon adoption of the draft Constitution by the Council of Representatives, the Constitution shall be presented to the people for discussion	The final draft shall be presented for adoption to the Constituent Assembly to be elected pursuant to the final draft of the Constitution.	
Transitional Program	Elections to a National Assembly shall be held on the basis of the provisions of the new Constitution	The Transitional Government shall hand over power to the party or parties that gain a majority in the National Assembly. The said national elections shall be held no later than two years after the establishment of the Transitional Government, provided, however, that the period can be extended by the Council of Representatives for no more than six months.	
Transitional Program	There shall be a law establishing local and regional councils for local administrative purposes defined on the basis of nationality. Elections for such local and regional councils shall be held within three months of the establishment of the Transitional Government, wherever local conditions allow. Relief and Rehabilitation. The Transitional Government is unequivocally determined to ensure the delivery of relief assistance to areas ravaged by war and drought. In connection with this: . . .		
Transitional Program	It shall make special efforts to dispel the ethnic mistrust and eradicate the ethnic hatred that have been fostered by the previous regime.		
Legality of the Charter	This Charter shall serve as the supreme law of the land for the duration of the transitional period. Any law or decision that is contrary to the Charter shall be null and void . . . .		
