= 1995 Ethiopian general election =

- 7–18 May 1995
- All 546 seats in the Council of Representatives; 274 seats needed for a majority
Party	Leader	Vote %	Seats	+/–
OPDO			176	−3
ANDM			133	−1
TPLF			38	+1
EPRDF			21	+8
This lists parties that won seats. See the complete results below.

General elections were held in Ethiopia on 7 and 18 May 1995 for seats in its Council of Representatives; elections in the Afar, Somali, and Harari Regions were delayed until 28 June to assign experienced personnel who could solve possible conflicts and irregularities. This was the first regular multi-party election in Ethiopian history, and the first election since the adoption of a permanent constitution the previous December. Several opposition parties boycotted the election, including the All-Amhara People's Organization, Council of Alternative Forces for Peace and Democracy in Ethiopia, and Ethiopian Democratic Unity Party.

== Background ==
After President Mengistu Haile Mariam fled the country, a national conference in July 1991 led to the creation of the Transitional Government of Ethiopia (TGE). The TGE's main goal was to establish a Constitution for a federal republic, as well as create orderly elections for the legislative arm of that republic. On 5 January 1995, the National Election Board of Ethiopia (NEBE) set the date for the general elections which would mark the end of the transition, for May of that year.

Observers considered it a foregone conclusion that the majority of the 546 seats in the Council of Representatives would be won by the ruling coalition known as the Ethiopian People's Revolutionary Democratic Front (EPRDF), which had assumed power after overthrowing President Mengistu and had been the dominant force in the TGE. Primary opposition came from the small Ethiopian National Democratic Party, led by Nebiyu Samuel. Four of the seven national parties boycotted the poll, alleging unequal conditions for the various contending groups. Despite this, one source states as many as 2871 candidates competed for seats, although the NEBE reported 2741 candidates competed, consisting of 1881 people from 58 political organizations, mostly components of the EPRDF, and 960 independent candidates.

To handle the millions of citizens who came to cast their votes, 40,000 polling stations were opened. In addition to local observers Britain, the United States, Italy, France, Sweden, Belgium, Austria, the Netherlands, Spain, Canada, Finland, Norway, and Russia provided observers and the Organization of African Unity deployed 81 observers. The election process was reported to be peaceful with a high turnout in most polling stations throughout the country. Despite this impression of civil behavior, candidates of the Silte People's Democratic Unity Party were harassed, beaten, and prohibited from travelling; Dr. Asrat Woldeyes, secretary-general of the All-Amhara People's Organization, was arrested, convicted and sentenced to two years imprisonment for being at a meeting at which armed activities against the TGE were allegedly discussed; and officials of the Ethiopian Democratic Unity Party were arrested in Gondar and Bahir Dar.

== Results ==
The EPRDF and its allies won 471 of the 546 seats in the Council, with other parties and independents taking the remaining 75 seats. Most of these seats won by other parties were in "frontier regions" – Afar, Somali, Gambela, Benishagul-Gumuz, and Harar – which were allocated 57 seats. "Competitions in these frontier regions tended to be extremely complicated," notes Lyon, who records such incidents as two brothers who, at one point, offered different candidate lists for the Afar Liberation Front.

Party or alliance		Votes	%	Seats
EPRDF and allies	Oromo Peoples' Democratic Organization	16,429,727	82.87	176
EPRDF and allies	Amhara National Democratic Movement	16,429,727	82.87	133
EPRDF and allies	Tigray People's Liberation Front	16,429,727	82.87	38
EPRDF and allies	Ethiopian People's Revolutionary Democratic Front	16,429,727	82.87	21
EPRDF and allies	Sidama People's Democratic Organization	16,429,727	82.87	19
EPRDF and allies	Gamo and Gofa People's Democratic Organization	16,429,727	82.87	15
EPRDF and allies	Gurage Peoples' Revolutionary Democratic Organization	16,429,727	82.87	14
EPRDF and allies	Wolayta People's Democratic Organization	16,429,727	82.87	13
EPRDF and allies	Hadiya People's Democratic Organization	16,429,727	82.87	9
EPRDF and allies	Gideo People's Unity Democratic Movement	16,429,727	82.87	7
EPRDF and allies	Keficho Peoples' Revolutionary Democratic Organization	16,429,727	82.87	6
EPRDF and allies	Kembata Peoples' Democratic Organization	16,429,727	82.87	4
EPRDF and allies	Dawro Peoples' Democratic Organization	16,429,727	82.87	4
EPRDF and allies	Afar Peoples' Democratic Organization	16,429,727	82.87	3
EPRDF and allies	Alaba Peoples' Democratic Organization	16,429,727	82.87	2
EPRDF and allies	Gambela People's Liberation Party	16,429,727	82.87	2
EPRDF and allies	Tembaro Peoples' Democratic Organization	16,429,727	82.87	1
EPRDF and allies	Bench Peoples' Revolutionary Democratic Organization	16,429,727	82.87	1
EPRDF and allies	Konso Peoples' Revolutionary Democratic Organization	16,429,727	82.87	1
EPRDF and allies	Kore Nationality Unity Democratic Organization	16,429,727	82.87	1
EPRDF and allies	Yem People's Democratic Front	16,429,727	82.87	1
EPRDF and allies	Total	16,429,727	82.87	471
Ethiopian Somali Democratic League		3,396,563	17.13	17
Southern Omo People's Democratic Movement		3,396,563	17.13	7
Southern Ethiopia People's Democratic Front		3,396,563	17.13	6
Benishangul North-Western Ethiopia People's Democratic Unity Party		3,396,563	17.13	5
Oromo Liberation United Front		3,396,563	17.13	4
Afar Liberation Front		3,396,563	17.13	3
Derashe Peoples' Democratic Organization		3,396,563	17.13	3
Ogaden National Liberation Front		3,396,563	17.13	3
Bench, Sheko, Dizi and Meinit People's Democratic Front		3,396,563	17.13	2
Dizi Peoples' Revolutionary Democratic Organization		3,396,563	17.13	2
Afar National Liberation Front		3,396,563	17.13	1
Argoba People's Democratic Movement		3,396,563	17.13	1
Burji Peoples' Democratic Organization		3,396,563	17.13	1
Gambela People's Democratic Unity Party		3,396,563	17.13	1
Hareri National League		3,396,563	17.13	1
Kebena Nationality Democratic Organization		3,396,563	17.13	1
Mareko Peoples' Democratic Organization		3,396,563	17.13	1
National Democratic Party		3,396,563	17.13	1
Silte People's Democratic Unity Party		3,396,563	17.13	1
Western Somali Democratic Party		3,396,563	17.13	1
Zeisei Peoples' Democratic Organization		3,396,563	17.13	1
Other parties		3,396,563	17.13	2
Independents		3,396,563	17.13	10
Total		19,826,290	100.00	546
Valid votes		19,826,290	99.20	
Invalid/blank votes		159,889	0.80	
Total votes		19,986,179	100.00	
Registered voters/turnout		21,337,379	93.67	
Source: Nohlen et al.
