= 1973 Ethiopian general election =

← 1969	23 June and 7 July 1973	1987 →
- All 250 seats in the Chamber of Deputies; 126 seats needed for a majority
Party	Vote %	Seats	+/–
Independents	100	250	0
This lists parties that won seats. See the complete results below.
Prime Minister before	Prime Minister after
Aklilu Habte-Wold; Independent	Aklilu Habte-Wold; Independent

General elections were held in Ethiopia between 23 June and 7 July 1973 to elect all 250 members of the Chamber of Deputies, the lower house of the Imperial Parliament (the upper house, the Senate, consisted of 125 senators appointed by the Emperor). They were the last elections to be held under imperial rule in Ethiopia. The elections were called after the parliament elected in 1969 was dissolved. Prior to the dissolution of the old parliament, the Emperor Haile Selassie had put forward a proposal for land reform, including a new system of land taxation.

As no political parties were allowed under the 1955 constitution, only independent candidates contested the polls. All Ethiopian citizens aged 21 years and above were eligible to vote. In total the number of registered voters numbered around 7.3 million. Some 4,234,000 registered voters took part in the polls. The highest voter turnout (around 66%) was noted amongst the younger generation, aged 25 to 35.

Each electoral district, covering a population of around 200,000, was represented by two deputies. Towns with a population of above 30,000 had an additional deputy and then yet another deputy for every additional 50,000 inhabitants.

A total of 1,500 candidates stood in the elections. Candidates had to be Ethiopians by birth, at least 25 years old and registered as residents in the constituency they contested. A candidate also needed to own real property worth E$ 1,000 and personal property of E$ 2,000. 60% of the deputies elected were newcomers to the parliament, as many incumbent deputies either chose not to contest or had been defeated in the polls. Overall, there was a trend of pro-land reform incumbents being defeated and anti-land reform candidates getting elected.

After the elections Endelkachew Makonnen became Prime Minister of the country. The deputies were elected for a four-year term, which was interrupted by the overthrow of the imperial administration in 1974.
