= Constitution of 1931 =

Constitution of 1931 may refer to:

- Provisional Constitution of the Republic of China
- Spanish Constitution of 1931
- 1931 Constitution of Ethiopia
- 1931 Yugoslav Constitution
