= Ethiopia–South Sudan border =

International border

The Ethiopia–South Sudan border stretches 1,114 kilometers from the tripoint of Sudan in the northern beginning of the Illemi Triangle disputed area between Kenya and South Sudan. The border was created by the sphere of influence of British colonial administration in May 1902, creating Anglo-Egyptian Sudan. It shares projecting border via Gambela Region of Ethiopia with 543 miles. Livelihood in this area often subjected exclusion from political, economic and other development associations as there is prevalence of armed insurgent groups like Gambela People's Liberation Movement, which engage in illicit trade, child abduction, cattle rustling and arm smuggling.

Ethiopia and South Sudan in map

In 1956, the Comprehensive Peace Agreement (CPA) signed between the North and Southern Sudan to demarcate the border of Southern Sudan, and promoted by the 1972 Addis Ababa Agreement. Since South Sudan gained independence in 2011, the most recent negotiation agreement was signed in Addis Ababa on 27 September 2012.

== Overview ==
The land boundary between Ethiopia and South Sudan was formed by the British colonial holdings (Kenya, Sudan, and Uganda) and the Ethiopian Empire in May 1902. It stretches 1,114 kilometers from tripoint of Sudan with Sudan in the north beginning of the Illemi Triangle disputed area between Kenya and South Sudan. This tripoint has subjected in dispute with Kenya, which has 214 km of boundary with Ethiopia, and claimed by South Sudan and Kenya.

The Ethiopia–South Sudan boundary shares protruding border with 543 miles along the border of Gambela Region in Ethiopia. People in this area considered minor, including lack of development, political participation, economic inclusion, infrastructure, and other public services. Furthermore, the conflict has suffered from persistent intergroup conflict perpetuated by insurgent groups like Gambela People's Liberation Movement and typically engage in illicit trade, child abduction, cattle rustling and arm smuggling. Both countries' central government lacked suitable relationship and borderland regions.

During the 1960s and 1970s, the Ethiopian government supported Southern Sudan factions such as the Sudan People's Liberation Movement/Army (SPLM/A) with arms, in response to Sudanese aid of armed movement against Emperor Haile Selassie and the Derg government.

On 1 January 1956, the Comprehensive Peace Agreement (CPA) and SPLM signed a treaty that ratifies Southern Sudan should be provincial boundary, and the proposal continued precedent set by the 1972 Addis Ababa Agreement, which also support the southern region. Since South Sudan gained independence in 2011, the negotiation was moved far away from CPA as the central point of reference. The most recent relevant border agreement was signed in Addis Ababa on 27 September 2012, featuring physical description and delimitation and corresponding to recommendation of the Technical Committee for the 1/11956 Border Line Demarcation between North and South Sudan.
