= House of the Federation =

House of the Federation may refer to:

- House of Federation, the upper house of parliament in Ethiopia
- Federation Council (Russia), the upper house of parliament in Russia
- House of Representatives of the Federation of Bosnia and Herzegovina, the lower house of parliament in Bosnia and Herzegovina
- Senate of Pakistan, the upper legislative chamber in Pakistan
