= Alemu =

Alemu (Amharic: ዓለሙ) is a male name of Ethiopian (Habesha) origin. Notable people with the name include:

- Alemu Abebe, Ethiopian politician during Derg rule
- Alemu Aga (born 1950), Ethiopian musician and singer
- Alemu Bekele (born 1990), Ethiopian long-distance runner for Bahrain
- Agwa Alemu (died 1992), Ethiopian Marxist Waz League politician
- Berhanu Alemu (born 1982), Ethiopian middle-distance runner
- Dagne Alemu (born 1980), Ethiopian long-distance runner
- Deriba Alemu (born 1983), Ethiopian long-distance runner
- Elfenesh Alemu (born 1975), Ethiopian female marathon runner
- Tadesse Alemu (died 2007), Ethiopian singer
