= Abrehot Library =

Public library in Addis Ababa, Ethiopia

- አብርሆት ቤተ መፅሃፍት
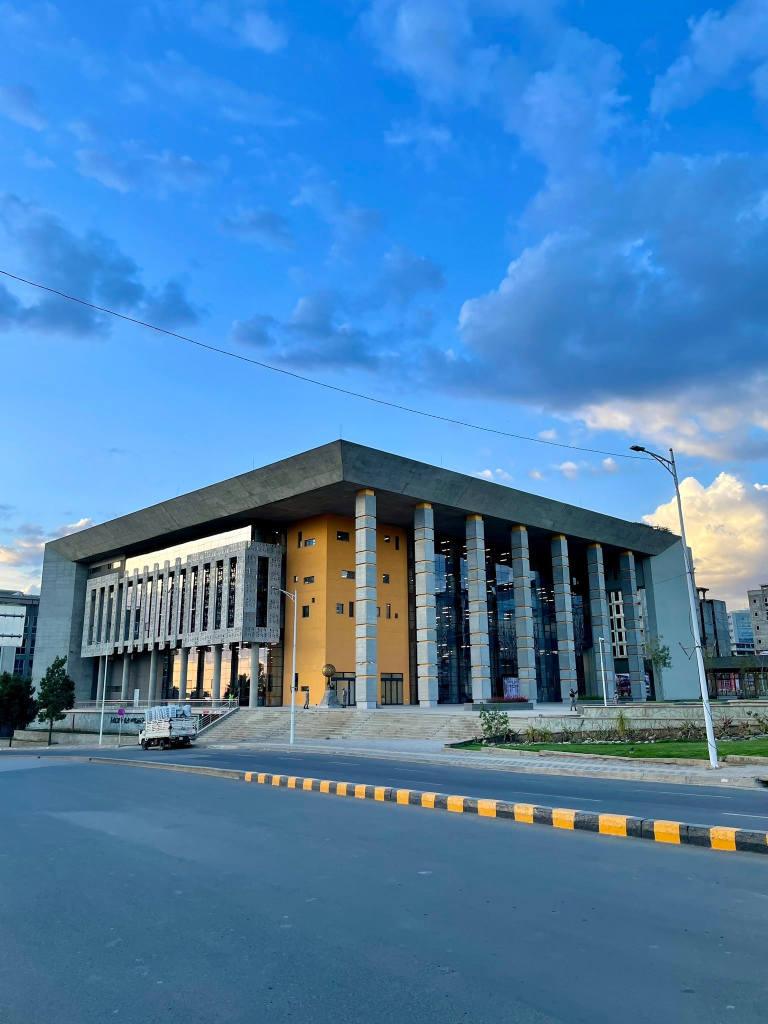
- 9.0303°N 38.7624°E
- Location: Arat Kilo, Addis Ababa, Ethiopia
- Type: Public
- Established: 2 January 2022
- Architect: Abba Architects PLC

Other information
- Director: Wubayehu Mamo Agonafir (Director General)
- Employees: over 300
- Parent organization: Addis Ababa City Administration
- Website: abrehot.org.et

Abrehot Library (Amharic: አብርሆት ቤተ መፅሃፍት) is a public library in Addis Ababa, Ethiopia. It was officially opened in January 2022 in a ceremony presided over by Prime Minister Abiy Ahmed who initiated the project.

== Background ==
Built at a cost of over 1.1 billion birr, and at a size of 19,000 square meters, it is the largest library in Ethiopia. Abrehot, meaning ‘Enlightenment’, in the Amharic language, is located in front of the Ethiopian Parliament Building.

The building was designed by ZIAS Design International PLC, construction of the 19,000-square-meter facility took almost two years. The 4-storey facility, the biggest public library in the country, is equipped with 1.5 km long shelves that are capable of holding 1.4 million books, and can accommodate more than 2,000 users at a time. The design of Abrehot is centered on three areas, making use of both outdoor and indoor learning spaces. The Knowledge Garden is an outdoor space, delineated by lines of Olive trees and with a central planting of four Sessa legume trees to form a natural performance area. The Knowledge Springs is a dedicated online learning zone. The Knowledge Centre is the library itself. It also has 8 bookstores, a meeting room, cafeteria, and a children's reading area. The library operates 24 hours a day, including weekends and public holidays, though it may briefly close during the early morning for daily maintenance and cleaning.

A number of bodies and private individuals responded to a government call to donate books to Abrehot including Book Aid International, Ethiopia Reads, and the office of the Prime Minister. Abrehot library also currently houses more than 300,000 local and 120,000 international research papers.
