= Dhaanto =

Somali music genre and type of dance

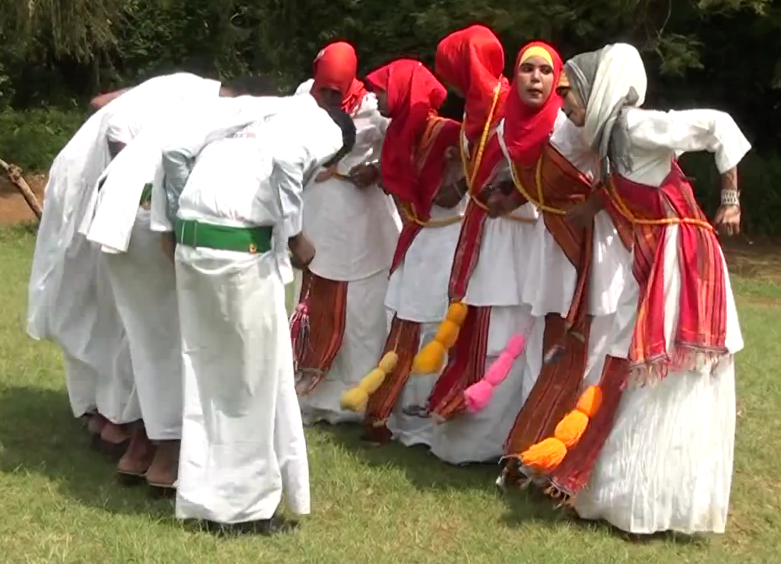
Somali young women and men performing the traditional dhaanto dance-song in Jubaland.

Dhaanto is a style of traditional Somali music and folk dance. It is a cultural folk dance native to the Somali people in the Horn of Africa.

== History ==
The word "Dhaanto" roughly means "the best of dances". It is the name of the traditional Somali chants most common in the Ogaden region. It was revived in the late 19th century by the Dervish Movement, and was used to raise the 'spirits' of soldiers and was often sung on horseback. It was then again used in the Ogaden war. Dhaanto became popular among the Somalis in Ethiopia and quickly spread to other Somali territories in the Horn of Africa. In the Ogaden region, this dance is very popular and you will annually see ethnic Somalis perform different versions of this dance at the Nations, Nationalities and Peoples' Day in Jigjiga. Additionally, the genre is also employed in Islamic poetry.
