= 1965 Ethiopian general election =

General elections were held in Ethiopia in 1965 to elect all members of the Chamber of Deputies, the lower house of the Imperial Parliament. Political parties were banned, so all candidates were independents. Aklilu Habte-Wold remained Prime Minister after the election.
