= House of Federation =

Upper house in the parliament of Ethiopia

House of Federation የፌዴሬሽን ምክር ቤት
- 6th Ethiopian Parliament

Type
- Type: Upper house of the bicameral legislature of Ethiopia
- Chambers: Second
- Term limits: Five years

History
- Founded: 21 August 1995; 30 years ago
- New session started: 9 October 2023

Leadership
- Speaker: Agegnehu Teshager, PP since 4 October 2021
- Deputy Speaker: Zahara Umud since 4 October 2021

Structure
- Seats: 112
- Joint committees: Committee for Regional & Constitutional Affairs; Budget Subsidy & Revenue Affairs Committee

Elections
- Voting system: Indirect election

Meeting place
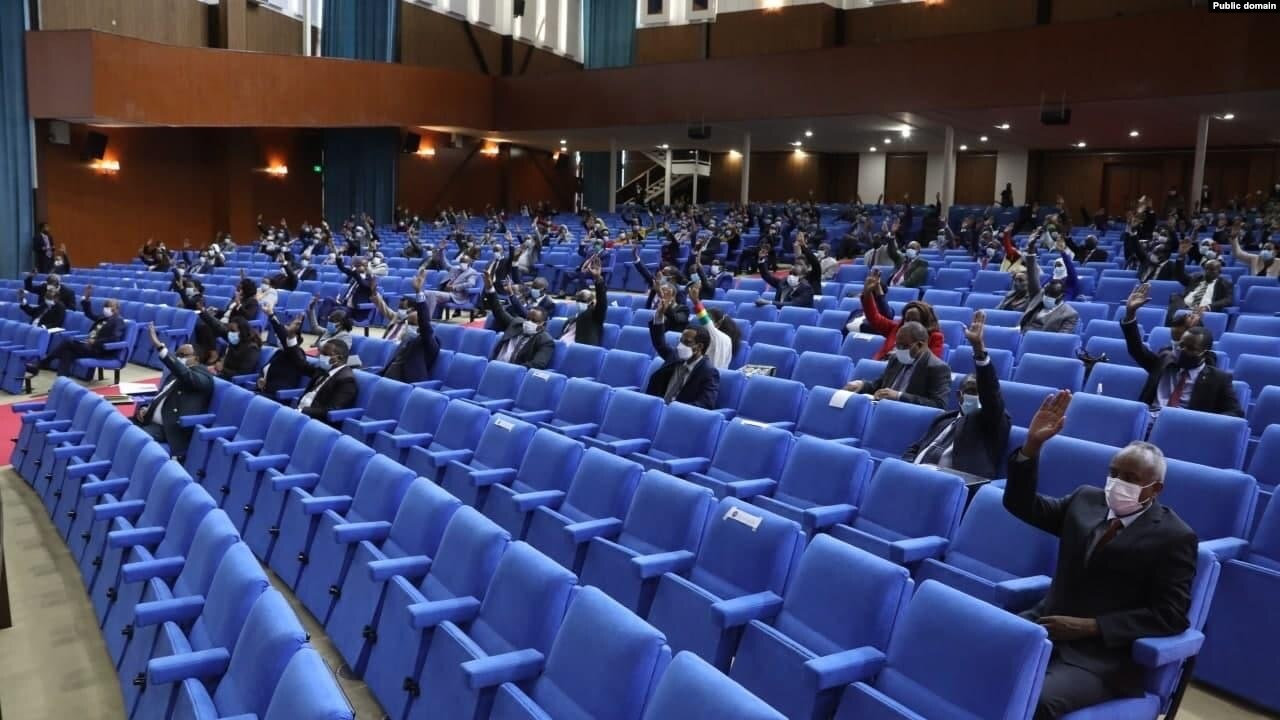
- Ethiopian Parliament Building, Addis Ababa, Ethiopia; 9.0301235°N 38.7623748°E

Website
- www.hofethiopia.gov.et

Constitution
- 1995 Constitution

The House of Federation (Amharic: የፌዴሬሽን ምክር ቤት, romanized: Ye-Fēdērēshin Mikir Bēt) is the upper house of the bicameral Federal Parliamentary Assembly, the parliament of Ethiopia. It has 112 members.

Each Nation, Nationality and People shall be represented in the House of the Federation by at least one member. Each Nation or Nationality shall be represented by one additional representative for each one million of its population (Article 61:2 of the constitution).

Members of the House of the Federation shall be elected by the State Councils. The State Councils may themselves elect representatives to the House of the Federation, or they may hold elections to have the representatives elected by the people directly (Article 61:3 of the constitution).

== Committees ==
The House of Federation has two committees and a Council of Constitutional Inquiry. Each committee consists of fifteen members including a chairperson. The two committees are the Regional & Constitutional Affairs and Budget Subsidy & Revenue Affairs.

=== Committee for Regional & Constitutional Affairs ===
The Committee for States' Affairs is responsible for taking measures that promote unity with the consent of peoples and manages the implementation of the rights of nations and nationalities that fall under the jurisdiction of the House of the Federation. With the approval of the House Speaker, it creates committees to resolve disputes or misunderstandings that occur between states and failed to reach an agreement at the state level. It's the committee's duty to present a report to the House for Federation intervention if any state, in violation of the Constitution, endangers the constitutional order. The committee also responsible for Legal Affairs identified civil cases that need to be incorporated into the code. It also has the duty of coming up with issues that require a constitutional amendment and reviewing similar cases to present recommendations to the House. It is also responsible to see that the rights of deputies aren't infringed and to identify other disciplinary actions the house should take when the quorum for House Sessions repeatedly fails to materialize.

=== Budget Subsidy & Revenue Affairs Committee ===
The job of this committee is to present recommendations in determining the division of revenues derived from joint federal and state tax sources which is proposed by the executive branch and the subsidies that the federal government may provide to the states. The committee conducts a thorough review and presents a report in cases where conflicting issues arise in the division of revenues. In consultation with the House speakers, it names a committee to draft the budget of the House and performs a follow-up that this is done at the right time.

== List of speakers ==
Name	Took office	Left office	Notes
Almaz Meko	1995	August 2001	
Mulatu Teshome	10 October 2002	10 October 2005	
Degefe Bula	10 October 2005	2010	
Kassa Teklebirhan	October 2010	October 2015	
Yalew Abate	October 2015	6 May 2018	
Keria Ibrahim	6 May 2018	10 June 2020	
Adam Farah	10 June 2020	4 October 2021	
Agegnehu Teshager	4 October 2021	Incumbent	

== See also ==
- House of Peoples' Representatives (lower house of the Federal Assembly)
