= Yalew Abate =

Ethiopian politician

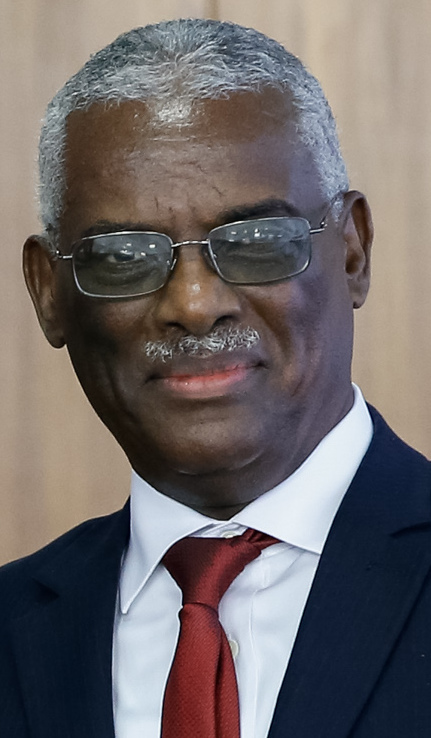

Ambassador of Ethiopia to Brazil
- Incumbent
- Assumed office August 2018

Speaker of the House of Federation
- In office 5 October 2015 – 6 May 2018
- Preceded by: Kassa Teklebirhan
- Succeeded by: Keria Ibrahim

Personal details
- Born: Wollo Province
- Education: Addis Ababa University

Yalew Abate Reta is an Ethiopian politician who was speaker of the House of Federation from 2015 to 2018.

== Life and career ==
Yalew was born in Wollo Province. He has an applied sociology degree from Addis Abeba University. He worked in public service in Amhara Region state. He was elected speaker of the Amhara Region state parliament from 2010 to 2015.

Yalew was elected speaker of the House of Federation from 5 October 2015. He served in that role until 6 May 2018. He took office as the Ethiopian ambassador to Brazil in August 2018.
