= Degefe Bula =

Ethiopian politician and diplomat (born 1968)

- ደገፌ ቡላ

Director of Federal Justice and Law Institute
- Incumbent
- Assumed office 2018
- Prime Minister: Abiy Ahmed

Speaker of the House of Federation
- In office 10 October 2005 – 10 October 2010
- Prime Minister: Meles Zenawi
- Preceded by: Mulatu Teshome
- Succeeded by: Kassa Teklebirhan

Deputy Speaker of House of Federation
- In office September 2004 – October 2005
- Prime Minister: Meles Zenawi

Personal details
- Born: 1968 (age 57–58)
- Party: Ethiopian People's Revolutionary Democratic Front
- Other offices: 1991–2001: Department head of the Ethiopian Television Agency; October 2001 – October 2005: Head of the Justice Bureau in the Oromia Region; 2011–2018: Special Envoy and Ambassador of Ethiopia to Uganda, Rwanda, Burundi, and the Democratic Republic of Congo

Degefe Bula Wakjira (Amharic: ደገፌ ቡላ ዋቅጂራ; born 1968) is an Ethiopian politician and diplomat who has worked in key positions in government cabinet level, since the beginning of the EPRDF regime. Degefe was the speaker of the House of Federation (HoF) from 2005 to 2010 after serving as deputy from 2004–2005.

In 2011, Degefe was the special envoy and ambassador of Ethiopia to Uganda, Rwanda, Burundi, and the Democratic Republic of Congo. He became ambassador after Prime Minister Abiy Ahmed came to power in 2018, working at a high-ranking position as the director of Federal Justice and Law Institute at ministerial level.

== Life and career ==
Degife Bula was born in 1968. he holds a LL.B, a LL.M, and a MA in leadership and organizational management.

Degefe's career began with the Ethiopian Television Agency, where he served as the department head from 1991 to 2001. From October 2001 to October 2005, he was the head of the Justice Bureau in the Oromia Region. From 10 October 2005 to 10 October 2010, Degefe had served with speaker of the Ethiopian upper house House of Federation (HoF) after serving in deputy position from September 2004 to October 2005. In February 2011, Degefe worked with the Special Envoy and Ambassador of Ethiopia to Uganda, Rwanda, Burundi, and the Democratic Republic of Congo, where he promoted good diplomatic relations between those countries and Ethiopia.

After Abiy Ahmed came to office in 2018, he had served with ambassador, working at a high-ranking position as the director of Federal Justice and Law Institute at ministerial level.
