= Kassa Teklebirhan =

Ethiopian politician

Ambassador of Ethiopia to Japan
- In office 2019–2021

Ambassador of Ethiopia to United States
- In office 2017–2018

Speaker of the House of Federation
- In office 10 October 2010 – 5 October 2015
- Preceded by: Degefe Bula
- Succeeded by: Yalew Abate

Personal details
- Born: Soqota, Ethiopia
- Party: Prosperity Party
- Other political affiliations: Amhara National Democratic Movement (EPRDF; until 2019)

Kassa Teklebirhan Gebrehiwot is an Ethiopian politician who was speaker of the House of Federation from 2010 to 2015.

== Life and career ==
Kassa was born in Seqota, Amhara Region. He has a bachelor's degree in economics.

Following Fall of the Derg regime, Kassa was deputy chief of command of National Defense in Transitional Government of Ethiopia from May 1991 to April 1993. He was a member of Amhara National Democratic Movement. He was a central committee and politburo member of Ethiopian People's Revolutionary Democratic Front for fifteen years. He worked in the public service of Amhara Region. He held leadership positions in Addis Ababa University since 2012.

Kassa was speaker of the House of Federation from October 2010 to October 2015. He was then appointed as minister of federal affairs and pastoral area's development. He was appointed ambassador of Ethiopia to United States from 2017 to 2018. He was ambassador of Ethiopia to Japan from 2019 to 2021.
