= Adem Farah =

Ethiopian politician

- አደም ፋራህ

Deputy Prime Minister of Ethiopia
- Incumbent
- Assumed office 1 April 2024 Serving with Temesgen Tiruneh

Vice President of Prosperity Party
- Incumbent
- Assumed office 12 March 2022
- Prime Minister: Abiy Ahmed

Speaker of the House of Federation
- In office 10 June 2020 – 4 October 2021
- President: Sahle-Work Zewde
- Prime Minister: Abiy Ahmed
- Preceded by: Keria Ibrahim
- Succeeded by: Agegnehu Teshager

Vice President of Somali Region
- In office 8 September 2018 – 10 June 2020
- President: Mustafa Muhumed Omer

Personal details
- Party: Prosperity Party

Adem Farah (Amharic: አደም ፋራህ), also transliterated as Adam Farah and Aden Farah, is an Ethiopian politician who was Speaker of the House of Federation (HoF), replacing Keria Ibrahim from 2020 to 2021 and Somali Region Vice President from 2018 to 2020. He is currently serving as Deputy Chairman of the Prosperity Party since March 2022. In April 2024 Prime Minister Abiy Ahmed appointed Farah as the head of the Democratic System Building Center with the rank of Deputy Prime Minister.

== Political career ==
Farah worked as head of the Construction Bureau at Dire Dawa City Administration until the Somali Region Council appointed him as Deputy President of the Region on 8 September 2018. Guled Awo, Communication Bureau head of the region told The Reporter that "The new officials were appointed after a consensus by both the regional council and the community leaders.” His appointment was held just after the arrest of former president of the Region Abdi Illey over alleged crime.

On 10 June 2020, Farah was elected as Speaker of House of Federation (HoF), replacing Keria Ibrahim, who had served that position for two years until her resignation on 8 June. On 12 March 2022, the Prosperity Party First Congress appointed him as Deputy Chairperson of the party, along with Demeke Mekonnen. Upon his selection Farah pledged "I want to serve diligently and ethically; in order for me to be Ethiopian and serve you all with impartiality, and loyalty, for time and situations not to take to here and there, pray for me.” On 1 April 2024, Prime Minister Abiy Ahmed appointed Farah as the head of the Democratic System Building Center with the rank of Deputy Prime Minister.
