= Zahara Umud =

Ethiopian politician

Zahra Humed
- ዛሃራ ሁመድ

Deputy Speaker of the House of Federation of Ethiopia
- Incumbent
- Assumed office 4 October 2021
- Speaker: Agegnehu Teshager

Personal details
- Occupation: Politician

Zahra Humed (Amharic: ዛሃራ ሁመድ) is an Ethiopian politician. She has been serving as the Deputy Speaker of the House of Federation of Ethiopia since 2021.

== Career ==
Umud was appointed and sworn in on 4 October 2021 after the 2021 general election. She had previously held other positions at regional and national level.

At a meeting with Speaker of the House of Peoples' Representatives of Ethiopia Tagesse Chafo on the Standing Committee of the Pan African Parliament (PAP) on 20 November 2023, Umud called on PAP members to foster a culture of peaceful power transfers, highlighting the importance of a framework for political stability in Africa.

In May 2025, she led the Ethiopian parliamentary delegation on an official visit to India, where she stated that she had come to learn from the Indian government's governance reforms and met speaker of the Delhi Legislative Assembly Vijender Gupta.
