= 1969 Ethiopian general election =

General elections were held in Ethiopia in 1969 to elect all members of the Chamber of Deputies, the lower house of the Imperial Parliament. Political parties were banned, so all candidates were independents, and Aklilu Habte-Wold remained Prime Minister.

The number of registered voters increased to 5.2 million, with 3.4 million voting. The number of candidates also increased, rising to 1,500.
