= Keria Ibrahim =

Ethiopian politician (born 1973)

Her Excellency Keria Ibrahim
- ኬሪያ ኢብራሂም

Speaker of the House of Federation
- In office 6 May 2018 – 9 June 2020
- Preceded by: Yalew Abate
- Succeeded by: Adem Farah

Personal details
- Born: 22 March 1973 (age 53) Asmara, Eritrea Province, Ethiopian Empire
- Party: Tigray People's Liberation Front
- Other political affiliations: Ethiopian People's Revolutionary Democratic Front
- Education: Economics (BA) and Environmental anthropology (MA)

Keria Ibrahim (Tigrinya and Amharic: ኬርያ ኢብራሂም; born 22 March 1973) is an Ethiopian politician who was speaker of the House of Federation from 2018 until her resignation on 9 June 2020. She was the Tigray Region's head of civil service and chief administrator of the South Eastern zone. Keria is one of the nine Central Committee members of the Tigray People's Liberation Front (TPLF), and the head of Women's Affair in the region.

== Background ==
Keria Ibrahim was born in Asmara (now in present day Eritrea), and raised in Wukro, Tigray Province. She was born to a middle class family that earned its living through the income earned from operating a small kiosk. Though she failed to pass secondary school, she had become an agricultural expert and progressed on her dream and awarded Bachelor of Arts in Economics and Master's degree in Environmental anthropology.

== Political career ==
Keria has worked in different levels of power in the Tigray Region from the district to regional level since 1988. She is one of the few female leaders in the Tigray People's Liberation Front (TPLF). Keria was speaker of the House of Federation (HoF) from 6 May 2018 until her resignation on 9 June 2020.

Keria was the only Muslim member of the TPLF, founding member of Ethiopian People's Revolutionary Democratic Front (EPRDF), Executive Committee.

=== Resignation ===
In March 2020, the House of Federation postponed the general election scheduled for August 29, 2020, to an undetermined date because to the COVID-19 pandemic. Following this, on 9 June 2020, Keria accused Prime Minister Abiy Ahmed's government of taking away the sovereign rights of the country and resigned from her role as speaker of the HoF. She stated that the constitution was being violated and a "dictatorial government” was being formed, and could not collaborate with a "historical mistake".

=== Arrest warrant and detention ===
On 13 November 2020, during the start of the Tigray War, the Federal Police Commission of Ethiopia issued an arrest warrant for Keria and 64 other senior members of the TPLF. According to the Federal Police Commission, Keria and her fellow members committed treason and were responsible for human rights violations and corruption. On 1 December 2020, federal authorities stated that Keria had surrendered to the federal security forces in Mekelle, the capital city of Tigray Region. On 16 January 2021, Keria appeared in court.

On 11 March 2021, Keria was released on bail. The prosecutor's office found no sufficient evidence to detain the suspects during the investigation, and asked the court to grant her a bail. But she has been remanded in the custody till further investigations are held.

On 27 May 2021, according to Al Ain Amharic, Keria went to court again, for she left her testimony. Keria had signed an agreement that she will witness on 42 members of TPLF. It was also a reason that has let her be released on bail. But Keria reported that she will not give any testimony, and the agreement was also made by force. Following this, she went to the court again.

=== Release from prison ===
On Thursday, 30 March 2023, Keria and all civil and military leaders of the Tigray People's Liberation Front were released from prison. It believed to be a result of peace deal between the government of Ethiopia and TPLF, an armed regional based political party.

== See also ==
- Transitional Government of Tigray
- Tigray War
