= Agwa Alemu =

Ethiopian politician

Agwa Alemo (died 11 July 1992) was an Ethiopian politician. He belonged to the Anyuak ethnic group, and became the first president of the Gambela Region.

Agwa was a member of the Marxist Waz League in the 1970s. He was sent to Cuba for political education. Upon returning to Ethiopia he was appointed administrator for the Jikaw District. When the Waz League and the Derg military junta sent in separate directions, Agwa was jailed for a short period.

After being released from jail Agwa began working for the UNHCR. He would also return to his position as Jikaw District administrator. Later, he became the chairman of the Gambela People's Liberation Movement (GPLM).

In 1991 Agwa became the first president of the Gambela region. He was one of two GPLM delegates to the Council of Representatives during the transitional period.

On 11 July 1992, a group of fighters from Agwa's own GPLM visited Agwa in his residence in Gambela. The soldiers presented demands regarding food distribution provisions. In the end, the GPLM soldiers killed Agwa.
