= Abay Tsehaye =

Ethiopian politician (1953–2021)

- ኣባይ ፀሓየ

Executive Member of the Central Committee of the TPLF
- In office 2001–2018

Personal details
- Born: 29 April 1953 Aksum, Tigray Province, Ethiopian Empire
- Died: 13 January 2021 (aged 67) Asgede Tsimbla, Tigray Region, Ethiopia
- Cause of death: Gunshot wounds by ENDF
- Party: Ethiopian People's Revolutionary Democratic Front
- Other political affiliations: Tigray People's Liberation Front
- Children: Hayet Abay; Aron Abay

Abay Tsehaye (born Amha Tsehaye: Tigrinya: ኣባይ ኣምሓ ፀሓየ; 29 April 1953 – 13 January 2021) was an Ethiopian politician and a prominent political figure in Ethiopia. He was active in the political scene from the early 1960s up to late 2018, initially as one of the founding members of the TPLF (from inception to 1990), followed by important positions from 1990 to 2018 within the EPRDF, which led the Ethiopian government, after which he retired and moved to live in Axum and Mekelle in Tigray.

== Life ==
Abay was born on 29 April 1953, in Axum, Tigray. He attended high school in Mekelle, the capital city of Tigray, which had modern schools at the time. He attended college-level education at the Addis Ababa University (AAU) (then called Haile Selassie I University). Aside from his academic work, he had an eye on activism, stemming from the difficulties he encountered as a Tigrayan.

Abay was a student activist while enrolled in Haile Selassie I University in the early 1970s as a member of the Tigrayan University Students' Association. He was always passionate when talking about the systemic injustices imposed by the Ethiopian state on the people of Tigray. He was one of many Tigrayans attending AAU who took up the cause of disenfranchised people and particularly Tigrayans.

Abay discovered that Ethiopians are not free if they cannot overcome the feudal state and the unjust arrangement which had them in a bind. He became a founding member of the Tigray People's Liberation Front (TPLF) with approximately 12 students. Abay was selected to be one of the first TPLF members to be given military training by the Eritrean People's Liberation Front (EPLF) and he arrived in Asmara in January 1975 after changing his name from "Amha" to Abay.

With Meles Zenawi and Sibhat Nega, Abay was one of the founders of the TPLF in July 1985. Following the end of the Ethiopian Civil War and the fall of the Dergue Regime, Abay became Minister of Federal Affairs in 2001. Abay was also an executive member of the Central Committee of the TPLF for a large part of his political career.

== Death ==
According to the Ethiopian government, Abay went missing in action in the ongoing Tigray War by the Ethiopian National Defence Forces under the command of Prime Minister Abiy Ahmed on 13 January 2021.

Two other Tigray People's Liberation Front officials were killed with him. The Ethiopian government alleged that the group refused to surrender. The other two veteran Tigrayans killed are Asmelash Woldeselassie, who was blind and with amputated left arm, and Seyoum Mesfin, Ethiopia's Minister of Foreign Affairs from 1991 until September 2010. Five further officials were captured.

Abay Tsahaye had heart surgery before the war. Their families and the TPLF have since said the three were taken from their homes in Mekelle and executed by the Eritrean and Ethiopian military. The pictures published by Ethiopian authorities indicate a point-blank execution of the former ministers and MPs.
