= Agegnehu Teshager =

Ethiopian politician

- አገኘሁ ተሻገር
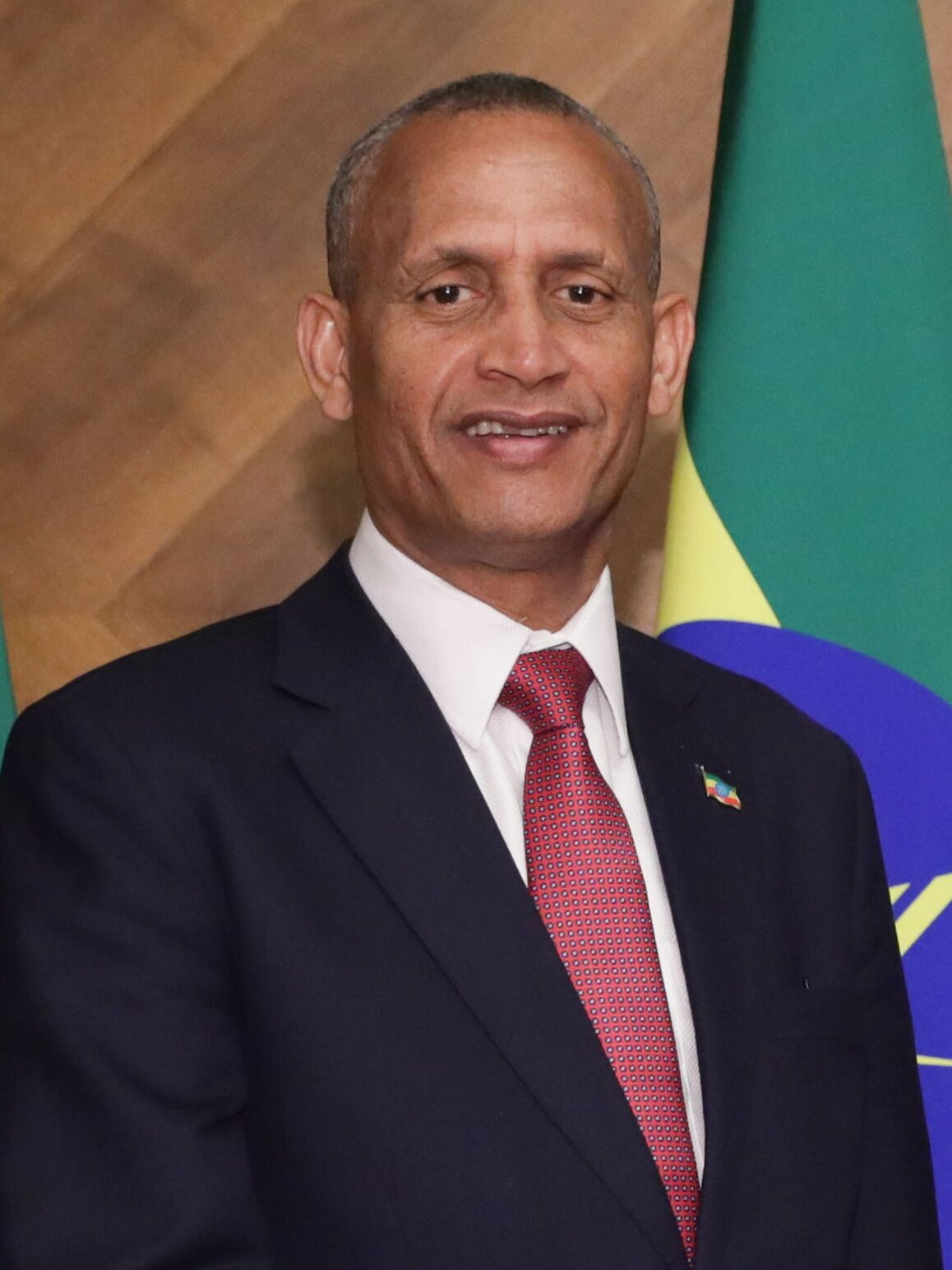
- Agegnehu in 2019

Speaker of the House of Federation
- Incumbent
- Assumed office 4 October 2021
- President: Sahle-Work Zewde; Taye Atske Selassie
- Prime Minister: Abiy Ahmed
- Deputy: Zahara Umud
- Preceded by: Adem Farah

Chief Administrator of Amhara Region
- In office 8 November 2020 – 30 September 2021
- Preceded by: Temesgen Tiruneh
- Succeeded by: Yilkal Kefale

Personal details
- Party: Prosperity Party

Agegnehu Teshager (Amharic: አገኘሁ ተሻገር) is an Ethiopian politician who is the current Speaker of the House of Federation since 4 October 2021 and was previously President of Amhara Region from 2020 to 2021.

== Political career ==
Agegnehu has previously served in different government roles, such as State Minister of Agriculture and Rural Development. He had served as Deputy Head of the Oromia Region State Office. Agegnehu played a significant role during the Tigray War. On 8 November 2020, he was appointed as the president of Amhara Region, succeeding Temesgen Tiruneh. His appointment was endorsed by the Amhara Regional Council. During his presidency, Agegnehu addressed the situation of Tigray War and the attacks of Raya, Tselemt, Wag, and Wolkait by the Tigray forces in July 2021, stating "The Amhara militias, the Special Force and the Defense Force are fighting against TPLF. The enemy is at full scale attack at Raya front while there are attempts of attack at Telemit, Wag, and Wolkayit." He encouraged people to stand with the Ethiopian National Defense Force and Amhara Special Forces to counter TPLF offensive.

On 4 October 2021, he was elected as Speaker of House of Federation by the parliament. Yilkal Kefale succeeded him as the next President of Amhara Region.
