= 1961 Ethiopian general election =

General elections were held in Ethiopia in 1961 to elect all members of the Chamber of Deputies, the lower house of the Imperial Parliament. Political parties were banned, so all candidates were independents. The number of seats was increased from 210 to 250.
