= Gambela People's Democratic Unity Party =

Former political party in Ethiopia

The Gambela People's Democratic Unity Party was a political party in Gambela Region, Ethiopia. GPDUP was mainly based amongst Nuer people, formed in 1992 in Nasir in the midst of mass displacements of Nuers as the Anuak-dominated Gambela People's Liberation Movement had taken control over Gambela in 1991. GPLM and GPDUP struggled violently against each other for most of the 1990s, until the Addis Ababa government intervened and forced the merger of the two parties into the Gambela People's Democratic Front in 1998.
