= Nations, Nationalities and Peoples' Day =

National holiday of Ethiopia on 8 December

Nations, Nationalities, and Peoples' Day
- Emblem of Federal Democratic Republic of Ethiopia since 1995 with the radiant star indicating equality of ethnic groups
- Type: National
- Significance: Nations, Nationalities and Peoples
- Celebrations: Festivals involving performing arts and music, and officials presence
- Date: 8 December
- Frequency: Annual
- First time: 2006

The Nations, Nationalities, and Peoples' Day (Amharic: የብሄር ብሄረሰቦች ቀን) is a national holiday in Ethiopia that observes the FDRE Constitution Article 39 recognition of Nations, Nationalities and Peoples. Officially observed since 2006, the day affirms harmony, tolerance, and equal rights for the people of Ethiopia's cultures and languages, and economic and political affinity. Former Prime Minister Meles Zenawi stated "the Day is an occasion in which the Ethiopian Nations, Nationalities and Peoples…develop their language and culture and also forge strong cooperation."

Celebration includes festivals showcasing the country's eighty different ethnic groups in various cities, with traditional dancing, music, and attire to demonstrate the country's unity and diversity. High-profile government officials are often present at the event.
