= Nations, Nationalities and Peoples of Ethiopia =

Ethnofederal concept in Ethiopia

The Nations, Nationalities and Peoples (Amharic: ብሄር ብሄረሰቦች እና ህዝቦች) refers to Ethiopians of all ethnolinguistic groups as mentioned in Article 39 of the 1995 Constitution. Under EPRDF rule, the FDRE Constitution was applied in 1994 and came into force in the following year. Article 39 explicitly mentions the term in five sections. The language and culture of these ethnic groups that historically residing in their respective territories is recognized under ethnic federalism. This implies the rights of self-determination is fully granted in Article 39(1). Since 2006, the Nations, Nationalities and Peoples' Day is celebrated on 8 December every year that includes festivals with all participating ethnic groups gathering and showcasing their music, traditional attire and other entertainment.

== Definition and usage ==
The Nations, Nationalities and Peoples is a term referring to all ethnic groups of Ethiopia collectively. Among those ethnic groups, Amhara, Oromo and Tigrayans make up a majority of the population, the former two being the largest with 60% of total population. After the fall of the Derg and the EPRDF seizure of power, Article 39 of the 1995 Constitution ratified the status of ethnicity of Ethiopia, giving full rights of secessionist seIf-determination. In the constitution, self-determination is a radical right, terminating the past unitary structure where all ethnic groups were discontented by public policy. Article 39 stipulates:

(1) Every nation, nationality and people has an unconditional right to self-determination including the right to secession.

(2) Every nation, nationality and people in Ethiopia has the right to speak, to write and to develop its own language; to express and to promote its culture; and to preserve its history .

(3) Every nation, nationality and people in Ethiopia has the right to a full measure of self-government which includes the right to establish institutions of government in the territory that it inhabits and to equitable representation in regional and national governments.

(4) The exercise of self-determination, includes secession of every nation, nationality and people in Ethiopia is governed by the following procedures:

(a) when a demand for secession has been approved by a two-third majority of the members of legislative council of any nation, nationality or people;

(b) when the Federal Government has organized a referendum which must takes place within three years from the time it received the concerned Council's decision to secession;

(c) when the demand for secession is supported by a majority vote in the referendum;

(d) when the Federal Government will have transferred to the people or their council its powers; and

(e) when the division of assets is effected on the basis of law enacted for that purpose.

(5) A nation, nationality or people for the purpose of this constitution is a group of people who have or share a large measure of a common culture, or similar customs, mutual intelligibility of language, belief in a common or related identities, and who predominantly inhabit an identifiable, contiguous territory.

== National holiday ==
The Nations, Nationalities and Peoples' Day is celebrated on 8 December coinciding with the adoption of the 1994 Constitutional Assembly. Since 2006, the holiday is celebrated, adorned by festivals participating the country's eighty ethnic groups gathering in every city and dancing with their music and traditional attire to demonstrate unity and diversity. High-ranking government officials also participate in the event.
