= Gambela People's Liberation Movement =

Rebel group in Gambela Region of Ethiopia

- Dates active: 1985 – 1998
- Headquarters: Pochalla, Sudan (1992)
- Active regions: Gambela Region, Ethiopia

The Gambela People's Liberation Movement (abbreviated GPLM) was a rebel group in the Gambela Region in Ethiopia. The GPLM was founded by Anuak dissidents during the Derg regime. The organization remained dominated by Anuaks. Agwa Alemu was the chairman of the GPLM.

== Founding ==
The GPLM emerged from one faction of the erstwhile Gambela Liberation Front (GLF). The group that would form the GPLM were supported by the Sudanese government and linked to the Oromo Liberation Front. The faction took the name GPLM in 1985. GPLM guerillas operated out of bases in Sudan.

At the time of its founding, the GPLM had the stated objective of liberating Gambela from domination by Highlanders (i.e. Amharic, Tigrinya and Oromo peoples). Moreover, the GPLM conceptualized Nuer territorial encroachments in Gambela as a national issue, i.e. as a conflict between Ethiopians and non-citizens. The GPLM labelled the Nuers as 'foreigners', making reference to the 1902 border which had placed the majority of Nuers in Sudanese territory.

== War against the Derg ==
The Derg regime labelled the GPLM as wonbede ('bandits'). This discourse, which insinuated that the Anuaks as a whole were outlaws and unreliable, had the effect of cementing collective Anuak resistance to the Derg (which in turn pushed the Nuer into strengthening their alliance with the Derg). In the second half of the 1980s, the GPLM began attacking settlers and civil servants in Gambela.

In the war against the Derg regime the GPLM would ally itself with the Ethiopian People's Revolutionary Democratic Front (EPRDF), joining the joint anti-Derg offensive in western Ethiopia in 1989. However, the alliance had an uneasy start. The GPLM discourse on 'Highlanders' differed from the other ethno-nationalist movements, whose discourse focused specifically on Amhara domination.

== Transitional period ==
On 16 May 1991, the GPLM and EPRDF forces captured Gambela, routing the Derg and SPLA forces. The GPLM would dominate Gambela politics during the transitional period of 1991–1994. After the victory over the Derg regime, the regional government in Gambela was handed over to the GPLM. GPLM participated in the 1991 National Conference. During the transitional period, the GPLM had two delegates in the Council of Representatives. In July 1992, the GPLM leader Agwa Alemu was killed by his own troops.

The transitional period in Gambela was marred by ethnic violence between Anuaks and Nuer. The Anuak GPLM fighters are said to have worn a magic called kunjur, supposedly making them bulletproof. It is said that many Anuak youths joined the GPLM, impressed by the force of the kunjur.

Relations between the GPLM and the EPRDF remained complicated. The GPLM did not become an EPRDF associate. Its ambition was to become a hegemonic force in Gambela politics, an aspiration that the EPRDF would not accept. The EPRDF government ordered a forces demobilization of GPLM fighters in 1992, which led to clashes in the regional capital. The GPLM forces retreated to Pochalla, Sudan (now part of South Sudan, where they remained for months until a settlement was reached. As part of the settlement, GPLM fighters were integrated into the national army.

== Merger into the GPDF ==
In 1995, under pressure from the federal government, the GPLM was renamed as the Gambela People's Liberation Party. In 1998 the federal government pressured the GPLP to merge with the Nuer-dominated Gambela People's Democratic Unity Party (GPDUP), forming the Gambela People's Democratic Front (GPDF). Anuaks unhappy with the GPLP-GPDUP merger formed the Gambela People's Democratic Congress.
