= 1955 Constitution of Ethiopia =

Constitution of the Ethiopian Empire from 1955 to 1974

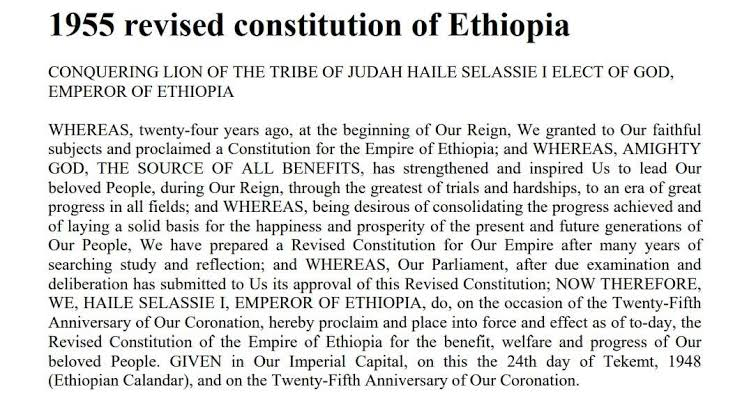
- The introduction page of constitution

Overview
- Jurisdiction: Ethiopian Empire
- Created: 4 November 1955; 69 years ago
- System: Constitutional monarchy
- Chambers: Senate; Chamber of Deputies
- Executive: Imperial Parliament
- Repealed: 15 September 1974; 51 years ago
- Author(s): A.H. Garretson; John Spencer; Edgar Burlington

Emperor Haile Selassie proclaimed a revised constitution in November 1955 of the Ethiopian Empire. The new constitution was intended to improve Ethiopia's international image. While it consolidated the Emperor's absolutist powers, it introduced concepts such as the separation of powers and expanded the role of the Imperial Parliament of Ethiopia. It was abrogated in 1974 with the Ethiopian revolution of that year which resulted in the abolition of the monarchy by the Derg.

== Origins and implementation ==
The 1955 constitution was Ethiopia's second written one, the first being the 1931 constitution. It was prompted, like its predecessor, by a concern with international opinion. Such opinion was particularly important at a time when some neighboring African states were rapidly advancing under European colonial influence and Ethiopia was pressing its claims internationally for the incorporation of Eritrea, where an elected parliament and more modern administration had existed since 1952.

The constitution was drawn up by three American advisors—A.H. Garretson, John Spencer, and Edgar Burlington—who worked with two leading figures of the restored monarchy, Wolde Giyorgis Wolde Yohannes and Aklilu Habte-Wold. After each session the two Ethiopian officials would then report to the Crown Council; according to Spencer, "In many instances, the Crown Council, dominated by the extreme conservative, Ras Kassa, would veto our proposals and we would then seek some compromise formula. Progress was extremely slow." It was eventually promulgated by a decree of the Emperor on 4 November 1955.

== Content ==
The new constitution consisted of eight chapters and 131 articles. While clearly "not a mirror image" of the U.S. Constitution, Edmond Keller notes it contained a number of ideas from that document, such as a separation of powers between three branches of government, and careful attention given to detailing the "Rights and Duties of the People", to which 28 articles were devoted.

However, the constitution did not create a constitutional monarchy in the Western sense. Despite the introduction of some ideas from the U.S. constitution, John Spencer, in his memoirs, lamented that the Crown Council forced the constitution's authors to stress the prerogatives of the crown, giving the emperor the right to rule by emergency decree, to appoint and dismiss ministers without input from the Ethiopian parliament, and to appoint members of the Senate, judges, and even the mayors of municipalities. Spencer also regretted that many of the rights were enjoyed "subject to the law". Bahru Zewde stresses the nature of these executive powers in his discussion of this document, noting that it was "a legal charter for the consolidation of absolutism." Bahru quotes the relevant section from Article 4 of the Constitution: "By virtue of His Imperial Blood, as well as by the anointing which he has received, the person of the Emperor is sacred, His dignity is inviolable and His power indisputable." This was underpinned by the embedding in the constitution of the myth that the ruling Solomonic dynasty was descended from the biblical king Solomon: Article 2 declared that the emperor "descends without interruption from the dynasty of Menelik I, son of Queen of Ethiopia, the Queen of Sheba and King Solomon of Jerusalem".

Although the Emperor's position was strengthened, the purview of the bicameral Ethiopian parliament was expanded over the 1931 constitution. Although the Senate remained appointive, the Chamber of Deputies was elected. In contrast to the legislature under the 1931 Constitution which could only discuss matters referred to it, it now had the authority to propose laws and veto laws proposed by the executive. It could also summon ministers for questioning, and in extraordinary circumstances it could initiate impeachment proceedings against them. Keller believes its most significant new power was its budgetary function: parliament now had the responsibility of approving or rejecting all proposed budgets, including taxes and allocations.

== Post-implementation history ==
In John Turner's opinion, the absence of a census, the near total illiteracy of the population, and the domination of the countryside by the nobility meant that the majority of candidates who sought election in 1957 were in effect chosen by the elite. The Chamber of Deputies was not altogether a rubber stamp, at times discussing bills and questioning state ministers.

This constitution was suspended by the Derg in their Proclamation No. 1, which was broadcast on 15 September 1974, three days after Emperor Haile Selassie was deposed.
