= Ethiopian Parliament Building =

Governmental building in Addis Ababa, Ethiopia

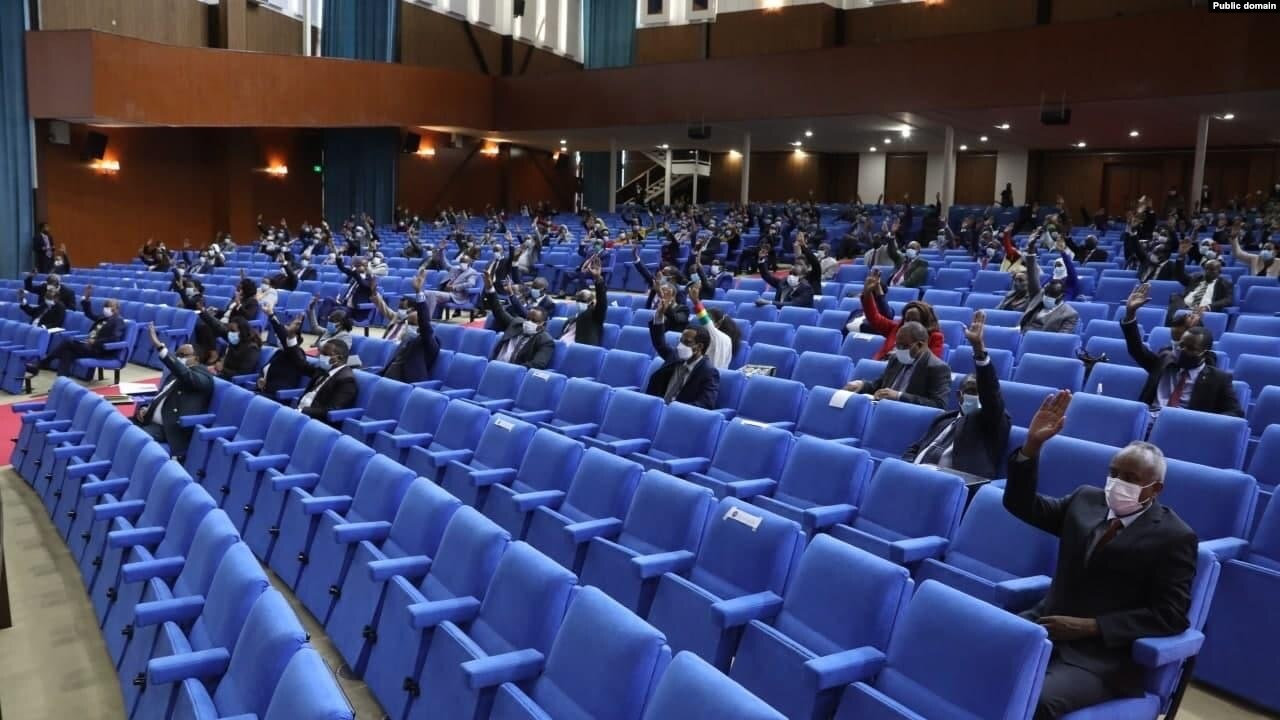
- Plenary chamber of the House of Peoples' Representatives
- Interactive map of the Ethiopian Parliament Building area

General information
- Location: Addis Ababa, Ethiopia
- Coordinates: 9.0301235°N 38.7623748°E
- Current tenants: Parliament of Ethiopia
- Completed: early 1930s
- Owner: Government of Ethiopia

The Ethiopian Parliament building is the assembly place of the Federal Parliamentary Assembly of Ethiopia. It is located in the centre of the capital city Addis Ababa.

== History ==
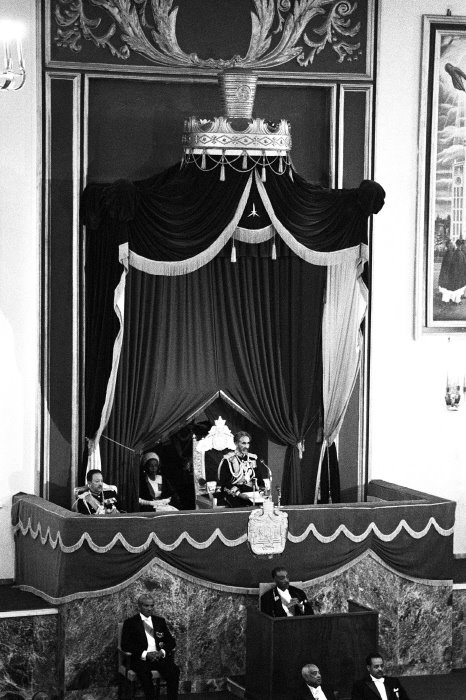
Emperor Haile Selassie I giving a speech from the throne in front of parliament

It was built in the early 1930s for the Imperial Parliament of Ethiopia. The central hall is flanked on either side by the chambers originally for the Senate (Yaheg Mawos sena Meker-beth) and the Chamber of Deputies (Yaheg Mamria Meker-beth). To the left of the building is a tall clock and flag tower. The main gate has two lions on either side.

Originally the main facade had a large mosaic of St. George and the Dragon (Ethiopia's Patron Saint) in its centre, flanked by the two Lions of Judah on either side. After the end of the monarchy the mosaics were painted over, and the gilding that covered the winged lions on the gates has worn away.

Although the Derg used the new Shengo Hall across the street as its parliament, the post-communist government moved parliament back into this older building.

== New building ==
In 2012, it was announced that a new parliament building would be built. It would be designed by a consortium of the Dutch architectural firms of Treurniet Architectuur and Michiel Clercx Architectuur and the Ethiopian firm of Addis Mebratu and S7 Architects. The design of the building is centered upon three drum-like shapes, symbolising Negarit drums, which were sounded upon the promulgation of imperial decrees. The symbol of the law-making process is transferred to the building's design. The three "drums" will host the House of Peoples' Representatives, House of Federation, and the parliamentary library. Since the site is sloped, below the drums will sit offices for MPs and their staff.
