= 1931 Constitution of Ethiopia =

Fundamental law of the Ethiopian Empire from 1931 to 1955

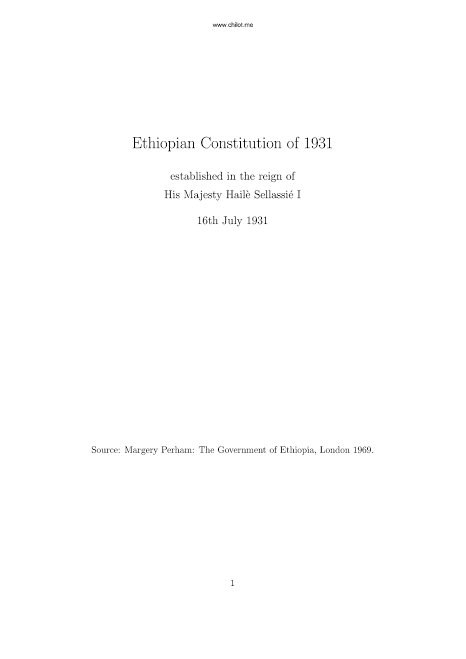
- Front page of the constitution

Overview
- Jurisdiction: Ethiopian Empire
- Date effective: 16 July 1931; 93 years ago
- System: Unitary parliamentary constitutional monarchy
- Executive: Imperial Parliament
- Author(s): Tekle Hawariat Tekle Mariyam; Gedamu Woldegiorgis

The 1931 Constitution of Ethiopia was the first modern constitution of the Ethiopian Empire, intended to officially replace the Fetha Nagast, which had been the supreme law since the Middle Ages. It was promulgated in "an impressive ceremony" held 16 July 1931 in the presence of Emperor Haile Selassie, who had long desired to proclaim one for his country. In the preface to his translation of this constitution into English, William Stern writes, "this was the first instance in history where an absolute ruler had sought voluntarily to share sovereign power with the subjects of his realm." This statement, however, is not completely accurate, as the adoption of a constitution was somewhat pressed by international opinion.

In virtue of this constitution, Ethiopia, one of the last absolute monarchies still existing, began the process of constitutionalization of imperial institutions, grounding the Emperor's authority on more solid basis, but also allowing some initial forms of limitation and participation; this evolutive process would continue after World War II with a new constitution.

== Origins and creation ==
According to his own autobiography, while still Regent Haile Selassie had wanted Empress Zewditu to proclaim such a document, but "some of the great nobles, to whose advantage it was to rule the country without a constitution, had pretended that it would diminish the dignity and authority of Queen Zawditu if a constitution were set up." Once he became Emperor, Haile Selassie then appointed a commission to draft the document. The commission's leading members included the Europeans Gaston Jèze and Johannes Kolmodin, but most prominently Ethiopian intellectuals such as Tekle Hawariat Tekle Mariyam and Gedamu Woldegiorgis. This constitution was based on the Meiji Constitution of Imperial Japan, a country that educated Ethiopians considered a model for its successful adoption of Western learning and technology to the framework of a non-Western culture. Unlike its Japanese model, the Ethiopian Constitution was a simple document of 55 articles arranged in seven chapters. It asserted the Emperor's own status, reserved imperial succession to the line of Haile Selassie, and declared that "the person of the Emperor is sacred, his dignity inviolable, and his power indisputable." All power over central and local government, the legislature, the judiciary, and the military was vested in the emperor. The constitution was essentially an effort to provide a legal basis for replacing the traditional provincial rulers with appointees loyal to the emperor. It was not intended to be a representative democracy, as the Emperor alone had the power to designate senators.

According to Haile Selassie, the importance of this legal innovation was not understood "on the side of the officials and the people". To educate them on constitutional theory, he called the leading members of both groups to an assembly where its principal author, Tekle Hawariat, delivered a lengthy speech which not only described the contents of the document, but expounded a theory of constitutional law.

== Characteristics ==
The 1931 Constitution consists of the Decree proclaiming the constitution and seven chapters divided into 55 articles. The contents of the chapters are:

1. The Ethiopian Empire and the Succession to the Throne. Five articles stating that Ethiopia is the domain of the Emperor, who shall be a descendant "of his Majesty Haile Selassie I, descendant of King Sahle Selassie, whose line descends without interruption from the dynasty of Menelik I, son of King Solomon of Jerusalem and of the Queen of Ethiopia, known as the Queen of Sheba.
2. The Power and Prerogatives of the Emperor. Twelve articles setting forth the powers of the Emperor.
3. The Rights Recognized by the Emperor as belonging to the Nation, and the Duties Incumbent on the Nation. Twelve articles stating that "The Law" will define the conditions to become a subject of Ethiopia, and the duties of these subjects. This chapter also sets forth some rights subjects enjoy "except in the cases provided by law" (Articles 25, 26, 27) and while they "in no way limit the measures which the Emperor, by virtue of his supreme power, may take in the event of war or of public misfortunes menacing the interests of the nation" (Article 29).
4. The Deliberate Chambers of the Empire. Eighteen articles which established a bicameral parliament for Ethiopia. Until this document, there had never been a formal legislative body in Ethiopia. The lower chamber would temporarily be chosen by the Nobility (Mekuanent) and the local chiefs (Shumoch) "until the people are in a position to elect them themselves" (Article 32), while the upper chamber would be appointed by the Emperor.
5. The Ministers of the Empire. Two articles on the duties of government ministers, a system of executive officers which Menelik II had established in 1908.
6. Jurisdiction. Five articles setting forth the judicial system. Article 54 establishes Special Courts, required by the Klobukowski agreement of 1906, which gave foreigners extraterritoriality in Ethiopia, exempting them from both Ethiopian law and her justice system.
7. The Budget of the Imperial Government. One article requiring the Government Treasury to set an annual budget, which directs how the government will spend its money.

== Application ==
A few months later, on 3 November, the anniversary of the Emperor's own coronation, Haile Selassie convened the first parliament of the new constitution. Harold Marcus notes that Emperor Haile Selassie "hoped that the institution would stimulate nationalism and unity and that its members would popularize sociopolitical change in the provinces."

Following the restoration of Haile Selassie in 1941, he re-established the 1931 constitution, convening the parliament on 2 November 1942. This body included a chamber of deputies which was double its pre-war size, who were selected by a combination of an election, held on 9 March 1941, to elect a group of 20 for each of the 12 provinces, who would then meet at the provincial capitals to select five of their members to be deputies.

Despite the resurrection of the parliament, Haile Selassie promulgated a number of laws in the form of proclamations and decrees. It was not until his proclamation 34/1943 that the authority of the parliament was included. Laws were issued under the authority of the Emperor and the parliament until the end of February 1944, when the sole authority of the Emperor again was used, which continued until the beginning of November of that year, when the parliament was again in session.

The Constitution of 1931 was superseded at the time of Emperor Haile Selassie's Silver Jubilee in 1955, when a new constitution was promulgated.
