= Imperial Parliament of Ethiopia =

Bicameral legislature of the Ethiopian Empire

Imperial Parliament of Ethiopia የኢትዮጵያ ንጉሠ ነገሥት ፓርላማ
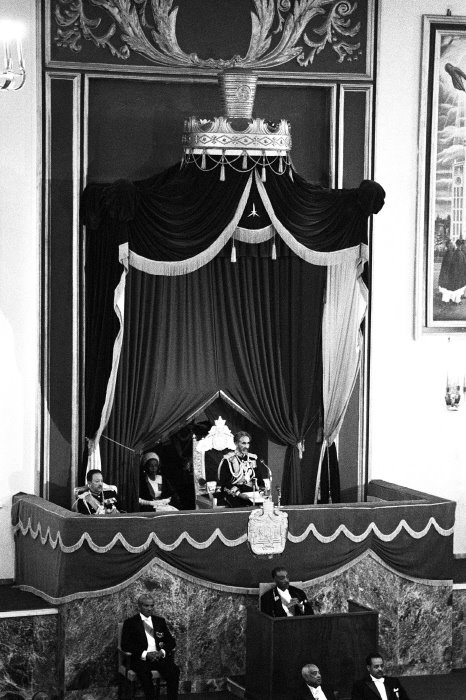
- Emperor Haile Selassie giving a speech from the throne in front of parliament

Type
- Type: Bicameral
- Houses: Senate and Chamber of Deputies

History
- Founded: 1931
- Disbanded: 1974
- Succeeded by: National Shengo

Elections
- Last Chamber of Deputies election: 1973

Meeting place
- Ethiopian Parliament Building

The Imperial Parliament of Ethiopia (Amharic: የኢትዮጵያ ንጉሠ ነገሥት ፓርላማ) was the bicameral legislature of the Ethiopian Empire from 1931 to 1974. It consisted of the lower house, the Chamber of Deputies, and the upper house, Senate. The legislature was established in the 1931 Constitution, all members appointed, primarily by the Emperor of Ethiopia. The 1955 Constitution introduced elections to the lower chamber. The Ethiopian Parliament Building was the meeting place of the imperial parliament. The last elections took place in 1973. The legislature was abolished by the Derg.

== Senate ==
The Senate, Yaheg Mawossegna Meker-bet (የሕግ መወሰኛ ምክር ቤት), was established in 1931. Initially, its members were appointed, and they came from the nobility, the aristocracy, cabinet ministers, and civil servants. The chamber was reformed in the 1955 constitution so that the members were appointed by aristocrats. In 1974, there were 125 members in the chamber.

=== Senate Presidents ===
Name	Took office	Left office	Notes
Bidwoded Wolde Tsadeq Goshu	1931	1936	
Kentiba Gebru Desta	1941	?	
Negash Bezabeh	1942	1943	
Blattengeta Lorenzo Taezaz	1943	1944	
Tsahafe Taezaz Wolde Maskal	1944	1945	
Mangasha Jambare	1945	1946	
Ras Bidwoded Makonnen Endelkachew	1957	1961	
Ras Asrate Kassa	1961	1964	
Lt-Gen. Abey Abeba	1964	1974	

== Chamber of Deputies ==
The Chamber of Deputies, Yaheg Mamria Meker-beth, was established in 1931. Initially, the members were chosen by the Emperor of Ethiopia, the nobility and the aristocrats. The chamber was reformed by the 1955 constitution, and members were to be elected. In 1974, there were 250 members in the chamber.

=== Presidents of the Chamber of Deputies ===
Name	Took office	Left office	Notes
Blattengeta Belatcho Yadete	1943	1945-?	
Grazmatch Gebre Kristos Wolde Michael	?-1953	1953-?	
Lij Haile Mariam Kebede	1955	1957	
Wossen Hailu	1957	1960	
Girma Wolde-Giorgis	1961	1965	
Fitawrari Bayissa Jemmo	?-1966	1967	
Ato Tadesse Taye	1967	1969-?	
Ato Seife Taddese	1970	1974	
Ato Abebe Wendimeneh	1974	1974	

== See also ==
- List of legislatures by country
