= List of ambassadors of Ethiopia to the United States =

Ambassador of the Federal Democratic Republic of Ethiopia to the United States of America
- Emblem of Ethiopia
- Style: His Excellency
- Residence: 2209 Wyoming Avenue, N.W., Washington, D.C.
- Appointer: The president of Ethiopia
- Inaugural holder: Blatta Ephrem Tewolde Medhin; First Envoy; Ras Imru Haile Selassie; First Ambassador
- Formation: 1943; Envoys Extraordinary; 1949; Ambassadors Extraordinary
- Website: Ethiopian Embassy, Washington D.C.

The Ethiopian ambassador to the United States is in charge of the Ethiopian Embassy, Washington, D.C., Ethiopia's diplomatic mission to the United States, The full and official title is Ambassador Extraordinary and Plenipotentiary of the Federal Democratic Republic of Ethiopia to the United States of America.

Fitsum Arega, who is also accredited to Canada and Mexico, is serving as the Ethiopian Ambassador to the United States since 10 April 2019, succeeding Kassa Teklebirhan in that post.

== Duties ==
The position of ambassador to the United States is considered to be one of the most important jobs in the Ethiopian diplomatic service, along with the Ambassadors to China, France, the European Union, and the Permanent Representative to the United Nations.

The ambassador's main duty is to present Ethiopian policies to the American government and people, and to report American policies and views to the Government of Ethiopia. He serves as the primary channel of communication between the two nations, and plays an important role in treaty negotiations.

The ambassador is the head of Ethiopia's consular service in the United States. As well as directing diplomatic activity in support of trade, he is ultimately responsible for visa services and for the provision of consular support to Ethiopian citizens in America. He also oversees cultural relations between the two countries.

== History ==
U.S.-Ethiopian relations were established in 1903, after nine days of meetings in Ethiopia between Emperor Menelik II and Robert Peet Skinner, an emissary of President Theodore Roosevelt. This first step was augmented with treaties of arbitration and conciliation signed at Addis Ababa 26 January 1929. These formal relations included a grant of Most Favored Nation status, and were good up to the Fascist occupation in 1935.

Warqenah Eshate, while visiting the United States in 1927, visited Harlem, where he delivered Ras Tafari's greetings to the African-American community and Tafari's invitation to skilled African Americans to settle in Ethiopia. A number of African-Americans did travel to Ethiopia, where they played a number of roles in the modernization of the country before the Italian conquest in 1935.

But it was not until after Ethiopia's liberation from Italian occupation that Ethiopia would reciprocate by opening its own Legation in Washington, which it did on November 9, 1943, with Blatta Ephrem Tewolde Medhin as the first Ethiopian Envoy to the United States. In September 1949 the Ethiopian mission was raised to the status of Embassy, and the Envoy, Ras Imru Haile Selassie, became the first Ambassador.

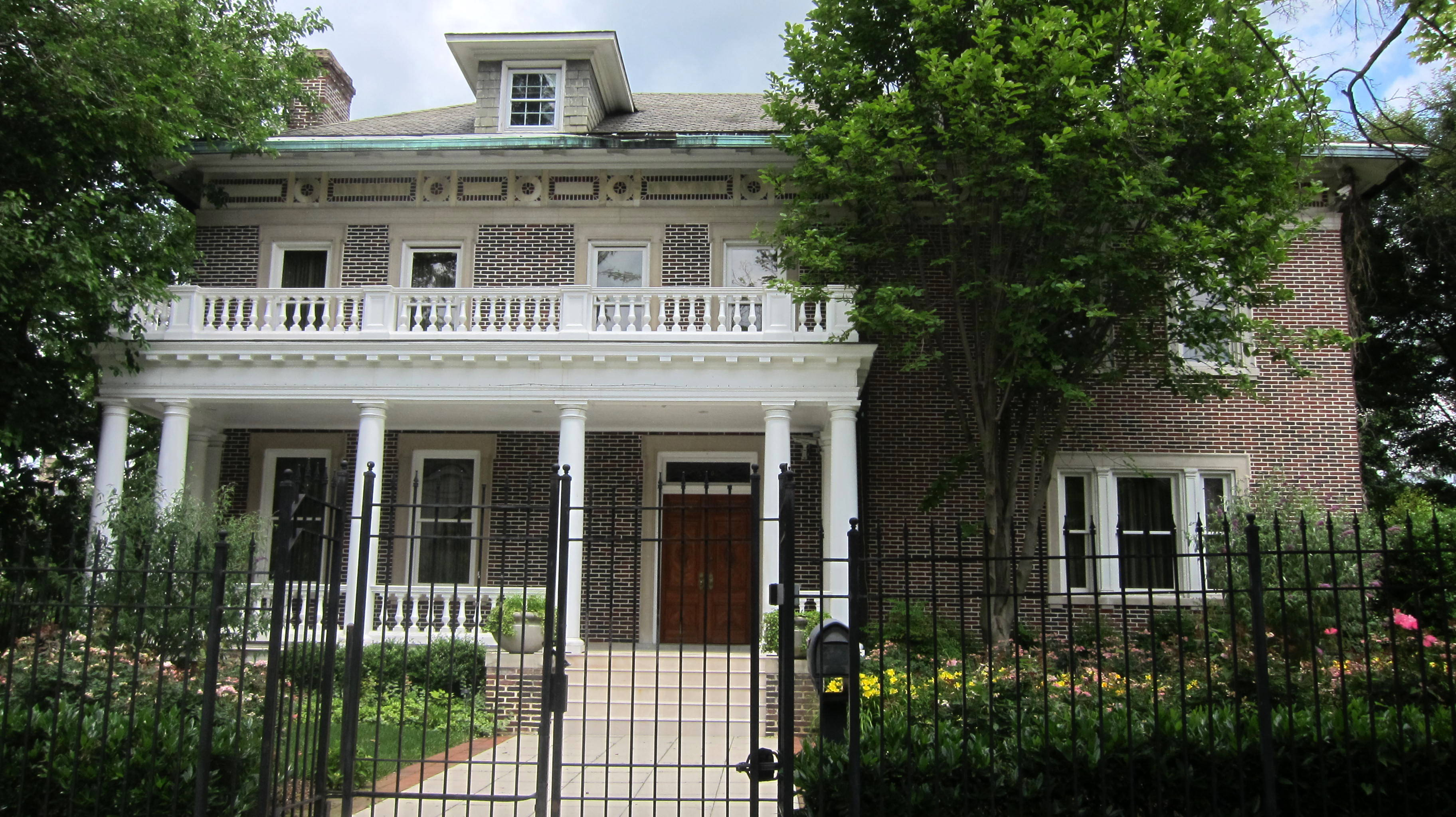
The residence of the Ethiopian Ambassador, in the Sheridan-Kalorama neighborhood of Washington, D.C.

The importance of the post was reflected by the careers of the ambassadors; amongst several other offices, five had served or would go on to serve as Minister of Foreign Affairs, two had served as Mayor of Addis Ababa, and one, Mikael Imru, would eventually serve as Prime Minister of Ethiopia. Relations between Ethiopia and the United States continued after the overthrow of Emperor Haile Selassie by a military junta in a coup d'état in 1974, but were broken in June 1978. It was not until 1992 that another ambassador would be appointed.

== Ambassador's residence ==
The ambassador's residence is located at 2209 Wyoming Avenue, N.W., in the Sheridan-Kalorama neighborhood of Washington, D.C. Built around 1929, the Colonial Revival-style building is designated as a contributing property to the Sheridan-Kalorama Historic District, which was listed on the National Register of Historic Places in 1989. The building previously served as the Dutch ambassador's residence and the Ethiopian Embassy's chancery.

== Heads of missions ==
=== Envoys extraordinary and ministers plenipotentiary (1943-49) ===
No.	Portrait	Name	Appointment	Credentials received	Termination of appointment
1	—	Blatta Ephrem Tewolde Medhin	November 9, 1943	December 20, 1943	March 27, 1945
2		Ras Imru Haile Selassie	May 6, 1946	May 15, 1946	September 21, 1949

=== Ambassadors extraordinary and plenipotentiary (1949-2025) ===
No.	Portrait	Name	Appointment	Credentials received	Termination of appointment
1	—	Ras Imru Haile Selassie	September 21, 1949	September 27, 1949	March 27, 1953
2	—	Lij Yilma Deressa	September 11, 1953	September 26, 1953	April 28, 1957
3	—	Bitwoded Zewde Gebrehiwot	August 25, 1958	September 30, 1958	October 8, 1959
4		Lij Mikael Imru	May 11, 1960	June 8, 1960	April 1, 1961
5	—	Ato Berhanu Dinka	April 28, 1961	May 23, 1961	June 15, 1965
6	—	Afe Negus Teshome Hailemariam	August 25, 1965	August 25, 1965	October 19, 1968
7	—	Dr Minasse Haile	October 18, 1969	October 31, 1969	June 11, 1971
8	—	Ato Kifle Wodajo	April 26, 1972	May 15, 1972	April 10, 1975
9	—	Ato Ayalew Mandefro	November 4, 1977	November 22, 1977	June 4, 1978
—	—	No ambassadorial relations	—	—	—
10	—	Ato Berhane Gebre-Christos	March 16, 1992	April 2, 1992	June 19, 2002
11	—	Ato Kassahun Ayele	March 26, 2002	June 19, 2002	January 9, 2006
12		Dr Samuel Assefa	May 11, 2006	May 15, 2006	November 19, 2009
13	—	Ato Girma Birru	January 6, 2011	February 23, 2011	November 29, 2017
14	—	Dr Kassa Teklebirhan	December 8, 2017	January 24, 2018	December 24, 2018
15		Ato Fitsum Arega	December 24, 2018	April 10, 2019	January 20, 2025

== Bibliography ==
- Metaferia, Getachew (2009). Ethiopia and the United States: History, Diplomacy, and Analysis. New York: Algora Publishing. pp. 208. ISBN 978-0875866468.
