= United Nations Security Council Resolution 1260 =

UN Security Council Resolution 1260
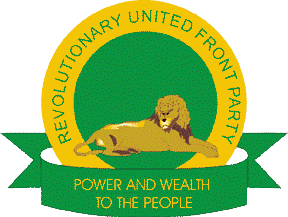
- Emblem of the rebel Revolutionary United Front
- Date: 20 August 1999
- Meeting no.: 4,035
- Code: S/RES/1260 (Document)
- Subject: The situation in Sierra Leone
- Voting summary: 15 voted for; None voted against; None abstained
- Result: Adopted

Security Council composition
- Permanent members: China; France; Russia; United Kingdom; United States
- Non-permanent members: Argentina; Bahrain; Brazil; Canada; Gabon; Gambia; Malaysia; Namibia; Netherlands; Slovenia

United Nations Security Council resolution 1260 was adopted unanimously on 20 August 1999; after recalling resolutions 1171 (1998), 1181 (1998) and 1231 (1999) on the situation in Sierra Leone, the Council strengthened the United Nations Observer Mission in Sierra Leone (UNOMSIL) by up to 210 additional military observers.

The Security Council recalled that Resolution 1245 (1999) extended UNOMSIL's mandate until 13 December 1999 and affirmed the commitment of all states to respect the sovereignty, territorial integrity and independence of Sierra Leone.

On 7 July 1999, a peace agreement was made between the Government of Sierra Leone and the Revolutionary United Front (RUF) in Lomé and the country was praised for its efforts to achieve peace. The Council authorised an expansion of up to 210 military observers for UNOMSIL, which would be protected by the Economic Community of West African States Monitoring Group (ECOMOG). It also authorised a strengthening of the political, civil affairs, information, human rights and child protection elements of the UNOMSIL peacekeeping force, including the appointment of a deputy Special Representative of the Secretary-General and expansion of the office of the Special Representative.

The RUF and other armed groups in Sierra Leone were called upon to lay down their arms and also participate in demobilisation and reintegration programmes. The Council welcomed that the peace agreement provided for the establishment of a truth and a human rights commission, and the adoption of a human rights manifesto by the parties in the country. There was need for international assistance for war victims and the provision of humanitarian aid, in particular areas of the country inaccessible to aid agencies. Long-term attention to child victims of the conflict was essential, and the reconstruction and rehabilitation of the country was also important.

Finally, Secretary-General Kofi Annan was directed to report on the situation as soon as possible including recommendations for the mandate and structure of the enhanced UNOMSIL force in Sierra Leone.

== See also ==
- History of Sierra Leone
- List of United Nations Security Council Resolutions 1201 to 1300 (1998–2000)
- Sierra Leone Civil War
