= Berhanu =

Berhanu or Birhanu is a male given name of Ethiopian origin that may refer to

- Berhanu Alemu (born 1982), Ethiopian middle-distance runner
- Birhanu Bayeh (born 1938), Ethiopian foreign minister during the Derg
- Birhanu Bogale (born 1986), Ethiopian footballer
- Berhanu Dinka (1935–2013), Ethiopian diplomat and economist
- Birhan Getahun (born 1991), Ethiopian steeplechase runner
- Berhanu Girma (born 1986), Ethiopian marathon runner
- Berhanu Kebede (born 1956), Ethiopian ambassador
- Berhanu Nega (born 1958), Ethiopian politician and Mayor of Addis Ababa
- Berhanu Zerihun (1933/4–1987), Ethiopian writer
- Dejene Berhanu (1980–2010), Ethiopian long-distance runner
- Girma Berhanu (born 1960), Ethiopian cross country runner
- Hilina Berhanu Degefa, Ethiopian women's rights activist

== See also ==
- Burhanuddin
