= United Nations Security Council Resolution 1245 =

UN Security Council Resolution 1245
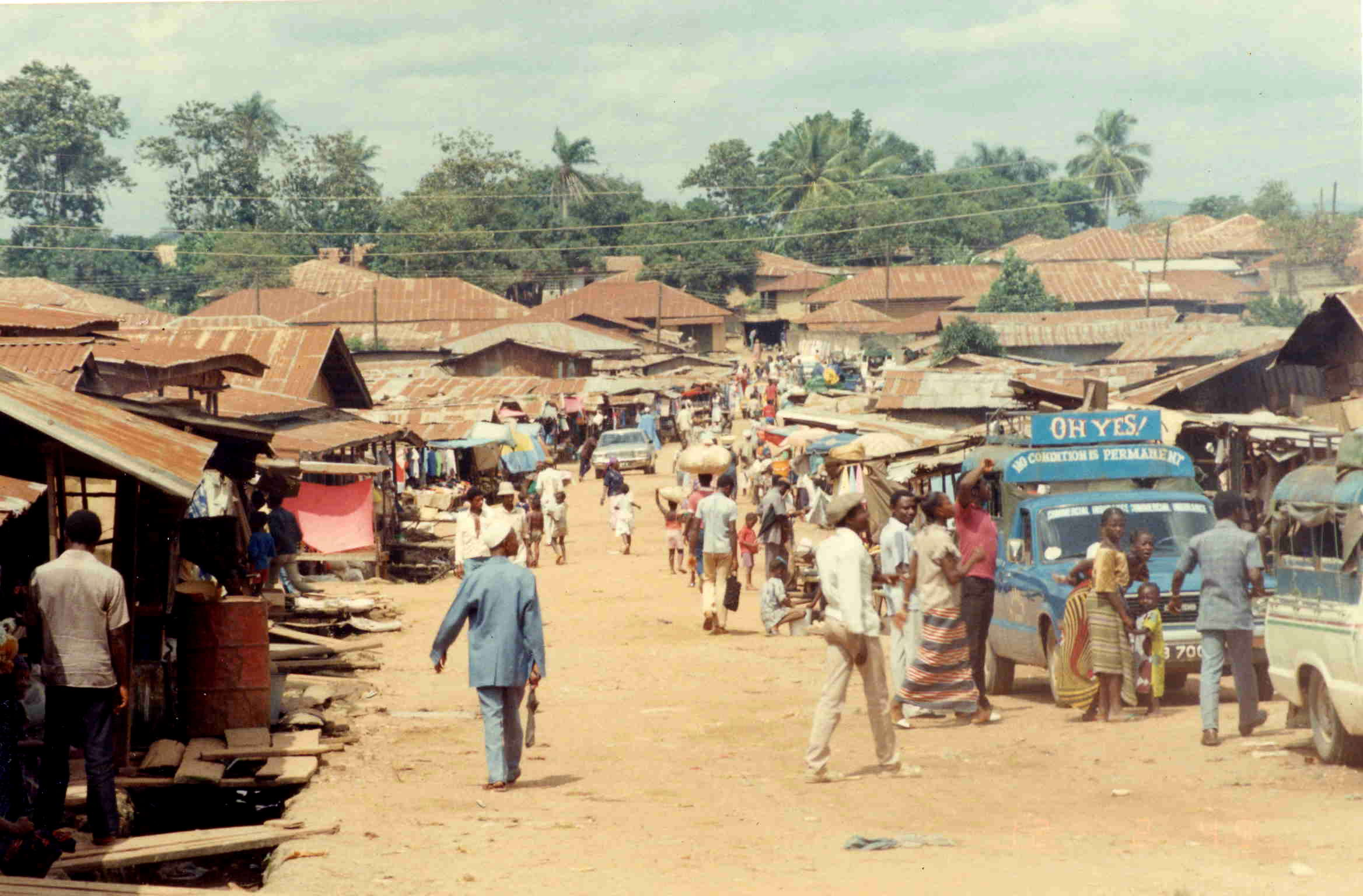
- Market in Koidu, northeastern Sierra Leone
- Date: 11 June 1999
- Meeting no.: 4,012
- Code: S/RES/1245 (Document)
- Subject: The situation in Sierra Leone
- Voting summary: 15 voted for; None voted against; None abstained
- Result: Adopted

Security Council composition
- Permanent members: China; France; Russia; United Kingdom; United States
- Non-permanent members: Argentina; Bahrain; Brazil; Canada; Gabon; Gambia; Malaysia; Namibia; Netherlands; Slovenia

United Nations Security Council resolution 1245, adopted unanimously on 11 June 1999, after recalling resolutions 1181 (1998), 1220 (1999) and 1231 (1999) on the situation in Sierra Leone, the Council extended the mandate of the United Nations Observer Mission in Sierra Leone (UNOMSIL) for a further six months until 13 December 1999.

The Security Council acknowledged the role of the Economic Community of West African States (ECOWAS) and its Monitoring Group (ECOMOG) and expressed concern over the fragile situation in Sierra Leone.

The resolution stressed that an overall political settlement and reconciliation were essential for a peaceful resolution of the conflict. In this regard it welcomed talks in Lomé between the Government of Sierra Leone and rebel representatives of the Revolutionary United Front (RUF). All parties were urged to remain committed to the negotiations and the Council noted in particular the role of the President of Togo Gnassingbé Eyadéma and of the international community in facilitating this process.

The Council noted the proposal of the Secretary-General Kofi Annan to expand UNOMSIL's presence in the country with a revised mandate if the talks between the Sierra Leone government and RUF rebel representatives were successful. Finally, the Secretary-General was required to keep the Council informed on developments in Sierra Leone.

== See also ==
- History of Sierra Leone
- List of United Nations Security Council Resolutions 1201 to 1300 (1998–2000)
- Sierra Leone Civil War
