= Minasse Haile =

Ethiopian diplomat and politician (1930–2025)

- ምናሴ ኃይሌ

Minister of Foreign Affairs
- In office 19 August 1971 – 2 May 1974
- Preceded by: Ketema Yifru
- Succeeded by: Zewde Gebre-Sellassie

Ethiopian Ambassador to the United States
- In office 18 October 1969 – 11 June 1971
- Preceded by: Afenegus Teshome Hailemariam
- Succeeded by: Kifle Wodajo

Personal details
- Born: 2 January 1930 Hararghe, Ethiopian Empire
- Died: 11 September 2025 (aged 95) New Jersey, U.S.
- Education: University of Wisconsin; Columbia University

Minasse Haile (Amharic: ምናሴ ኃይሌ, 2 January 1930 – 11 September 2025) was an Ethiopian diplomat and politician who served as Minister of Foreign Affairs from 1971 to 1974.

== Life and career ==
Minasse was born in Hararghe Province on 2 January 1930. He received his undergraduate education from the University of Wisconsin–Madison from 1946 to 1950. He received a J.D, M.A, and Ph.D. from Columbia Law School and Columbia University in 1954, 1957, and 1961, respectively.

He started his political career in 1961 as legal adviser in the Ministry of Foreign Affairs, helping draft the first civil service regulations of Ethiopia and established the first Personnel Administrative Agency. Not long thereafter, he was appointed Chief of Political Affairs of Emperor Haile Selassie's private cabinet in 1961. In 1964 he was appointed Minister of State for Information, remaining as a close political adviser to the Emperor who accompanied him on most of his overseas trips.

When a new government was formed in 1966, he became Minister of Information and Tourism. He was Ambassador to the United States from 1968 until August 19, 1971, when he succeeded Ketema Yifru as Minister for Foreign Affairs. As foreign minister, he continued his predecessor's policies of pro-Western non-alignment and neutrality on the Arab-Israeli dispute, at least until 1973, when Ethiopia broke ties with Israel under Arab pressure. He also helped broker the Addis Ababa Agreement which brought an end to the First Sudanese Civil War. He was considered to be pro-American and interested in Southern African problems (i.e., South Africa, South West Africa, Rhodesia, Angola, and Mozambique).

Following the overthrow of Emperor Haile Selassie, he went into exile and eventually taught at Cardozo Law School. As of 2021 he was Professor Emeritus of Law.

Minasse died in New Jersey on 11 September 2025, at the age of 95.
