= Degefa =

Degefa or Degefu is an Ethiopian surname. Notable people with the surname include:

- Beyenu Degefa (born 1999), Ethiopian long-distance runner, 3000 metres world junior champion
- Hilina Berhanu Degefa (born 1992), Ethiopian women's rights activist
- Worknesh Degefa (born 1990), Ethiopian long-distance runner, Boston Marathon champion
