= Blatta furcata =

Scientific classification
- Kingdom: Animalia
- Phylum: Arthropoda
- Clade: Pancrustacea
- Class: Insecta
- Order: Blattodea
- Family: Blattidae
- Genus: Blatta
- Species: B. furcata

Binomial name
- Blatta furcata (Karny, 1908)

Synonyms
- Periplaneta furcata Karny, 1908

Species of cockroach

Blatta furcata is a species of cockroach closely related to the Oriental cockroach. It is found throughout Lebanon and Israel.
