= Depopulation of cockroaches in post-Soviet states =

Post-1991 phenomenon in Eastern Europe and Central Asia

Since the beginning of the 21st century, the rapid disappearance of several types of cockroaches has been observed in Russia and other post-Soviet states. Various factors have been suggested as causes of their depopulation.

== Background ==
A mass depopulation of cockroaches has been observed since the beginning of the 21st century in Russia and other countries of the former USSR. Observers have noted a rapid disappearance of various types of cockroaches from cities and towns in Russia, Azerbaijan, Kazakhstan, Ukraine, Moldova, and Belarus. However, no such depopulation has been observed in larger Russian megalopolises such as Moscow, Saint Petersburg, and Nizhny Novgorod.

Scientists from Chelyabinsk and Yekaterinburg have suggested that the oriental cockroach should be added to the IUCN Red List of Threatened Species.

== Suggested explanations ==
The depopulation of cockroaches may be exaggerated, or this phenomenon may be temporary or cyclic. A number of explanations of the phenomenon are discussed in the media, of varying degree of credibility.

- Usage of plastic bags to store domestic waste and the discontinuation of rubbish chute usage.
- Cockroaches may have migrated out of homes to other, more suitable places.
- Transitioning from antiquated roach-management methods such as egg yolk and boric acid to newer poisons and methods may have led to more effective depopulation.
- Usage of modern construction materials may also contribute to the phenomenon; the population of cockroaches might have been reduced due to their purported ingestion of unsafe substances. However, cockroaches were noticed to disappear even in the houses where such construction materials were not used.
- The emergence of Pharaoh ants, who compete with the cockroaches for food, and may even feed on them. The ants will feed on dead cockroaches.
- Ozone holes may also lead to abnormal chronobiology in cockroaches.
- Internal competitions between cockroaches may decrease the number of cockroaches.

== See also ==
- Colony collapse disorder, bees
