= Yibeltal Aemero =

Ethiopian diplomat (born 1966)

Yibeltal Aemero ይበልጣል አዕምሮ Ambassador Extraordinary and Plenipotentiary

Ethiopian ambassador to Sudan
- Incumbent
- Assumed office 24 August 2020
- President: Sahle-Work Zewde
- Prime Minister: Abiy Ahmed
- Preceded by: Shiferaw Jarso

Director General for Neighboring Countries and IGAD Affairs under Ministry of Foreign Affairs of Ethiopia
- In office November 2018 – July 2020
- Preceded by: Fesseha Shawel (Amb.)

Chief of Cabinet of the Ministry of Foreign Affairs
- In office July 2018 – October 2018

Consul General of Ethiopia to Dubai and Northern Emirates
- In office January 2014 – January 2018
- Succeeded by: Eyerusalem Amdemariam (as Ambassador to the Ethiopian mission in Dubai)

Deputy Chief of Cabinet of the Ministry of Foreign Affairs
- In office 2011–2013

First Secretary, Ethiopian Embassy in the Republic of Sudan
- In office 2003–2007

Personal details
- Born: 21 May 1966 (age 59) Ethiopian Empire
- Children: 3
- Education: Addis Ababa University(BA); University of Kent(MA)

Yibeltal Aemero Alemu (Amharic: ይበልጣል አዕምሮ አለሙ; born 21 May 1966) is an Ethiopian diplomat who is the current Ethiopian ambassador to Sudan. Prior to his current post, he served as the director general for Neighboring Countries and IGAD Affairs under the Ministry of Foreign Affairs of Ethiopia.

== Career ==
In 1991, Yibeltal joined the Ministry of Foreign Affairs. In 1993, He was assigned as the third secretary at the Ethiopian Embassy in Pyongyang, Democratic People's Republic of Korea and served at the post until 1996. Following that, in 1996, He took the role of a desk officer of Somalia, Great Lakes Region and Egypt under the Ethiopian Ministry of Foreign Affairs and served until 1998. Yibeltal was then assigned as the desk officer of Sudan and Uganda from 1998 to 2003.

In 2003, he took the position of first secretary and first counselor at the Ethiopian embassy in Khartoum, Sudan, for a period of four years. After serving in Sudan, he was the first counselor in charge of peace and security of the African Union at the Ministry of Foreign Affairs until 2010.

After serving as the consul general of the Federal Democratic Republic of Ethiopia to Dubai and Northern Emirates from 2014 to 2018, Yibeltal was the director for IGAD Affairs, Neighboring Countries and IGAD Affairs Directorate General. Shortly after, he was promoted to be the director general at the Office of the Chief of Cabinet of the Ministry of Foreign Affairs of Ethiopia. In November 2018, he became the director general for Neighboring Countries and IGAD Affairs until July 2020.

Since July 2020, Yibeltal has served as the ambassador extraordinary and plenipotentiary of Ethiopia to the Republic of Sudan by President of Ethiopia Sahle-Work Zewde.

In 2021, has actively engaged in mediating on the border dispute between Ethiopia and Sudan.
