= Deressa =

Deressa or Deresse (Amharic: ደረሠ) is a male name of Ethiopian origin that may refer to:

- Deressa Chimsa (born 1976), Ethiopia marathon runner
- Deresse Mekonnen (born 1987), Ethiopian middle-distance runner and two-time world indoor champion
- Yilma Deressa (1907–1979), Ethiopian former Minister for Finance and Foreign Affairs

== See also ==
- Gedeo language, also known as the Deressa language
