= Wodajo =

Wodajo is a male given name of Ethiopian origin that may refer to:

- Kifle Wodajo (1936–2004), Ethiopian politician and former Minister of Foreign Affairs
- Wodajo Bulti (born 1957), Ethiopian long-distance runner
