= United Nations Security Council Resolution 1231 =

UN Security Council Resolution 1231
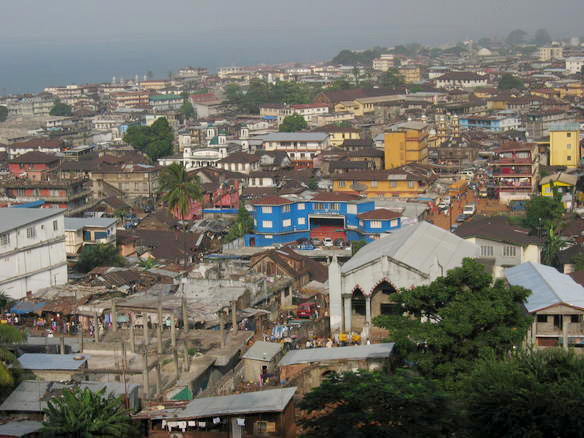
- Freetown, capital of Sierra Leone
- Date: 11 March 1999
- Meeting no.: 3,986
- Code: S/RES/1231 (Document)
- Subject: The situation in Sierra Leone
- Voting summary: 15 voted for; None voted against; None abstained
- Result: Adopted

Security Council composition
- Permanent members: China; France; Russia; United Kingdom; United States
- Non-permanent members: Argentina; Bahrain; Brazil; Canada; Gabon; Gambia; Malaysia; Namibia; Netherlands; Slovenia

United Nations Security Council resolution 1231, adopted unanimously on 11 March 1999, after recalling resolutions 1181 (1998) and 1220 (1999) on the situation in Sierra Leone, the Council extended the mandate of the United Nations Observer Mission in Sierra Leone (UNOMSIL) until 13 June 1999.

The resolution began by expressing concern over the fragile situation in Sierra Leone and expressed the commitment of all countries towards the sovereignty and territorial integrity of the country.

The Security Council welcomed the intention of the Secretary-General Kofi Annan to re-establish UNOMSIL in the capital Freetown and to increase the current number of military observers and human rights personnel. It condemned atrocities and violations of international humanitarian law committed against the population by rebels, especially against women and children and including the use of child soldiers and for the perpetrators to be brought to justice. The parties were called upon to respect human rights and the neutrality of humanitarian workers.

There was concern that support had been offered to the rebels through weapons and mercenaries through neighbouring Liberia. It acknowledged a letter from the President of Liberia Charles Taylor regarding action it had taken to curtail the involvement of Liberian nationals in Sierra Leone. In this regard, the Economic Community of West African States was requested to consider a deployment of Economic Community of West African States Monitoring Group (ECOMOG) and United Nations personnel along the border between Liberia and Sierra Leone. All states were asked to observe the arms embargo imposed against Sierra Leone in Resolution 1171 (1998).

Finally, the Secretary-General was required to report on the situation by 5 June 1999 with recommendations on the future deployment of UNOMSIL.

== See also ==
- History of Sierra Leone
- List of United Nations Security Council Resolutions 1201 to 1300 (1998–2000)
- Sierra Leone Civil War
