= Welega (disambiguation) =

Welega is a province in western Ethiopia.

Welega may also refer to:

- Welega Oromo people
- Kelam Welega Zone, in the Oromia Region
- West Welega Zone, in the Oromia Region
- East Welega Zone, in the Oromia Region
