= Desta Bairu =

Eritrean-American cook and restaurateur

Desta Bairu (June 1, 1914 - June 20, 2002) was an Eritrean-American cook and restaurateur.

== Early life ==
Bairu was born on June 1, 1914, in Asmara, then a colony of Italy. She immigrated to the United States of America in 1959.

== Career ==
She was chief cook for the Ethiopian Ambassador to the United Nations. In 1977, she founded Mamma Desta, an Ethiopian restaurant in Northwest Washington, D.C. The restaurant became increasingly popular with diplomats, students and refugees, all in Washington and disenfranchised by the dethronement of Ethiopian Emperor Haile Selassie in 1974. The clientele grew to include Peace Corps veterans and a wider American audience. It was named one of the "50 Most Influential DC Restaurants" by Washingtonian. Even though the restaurant bore her namesake, Bairu was not the owner Mamma Desta. It eventually closed in 1984 when Bairu moved to Chicago.

== Death ==
Bairu died in 2002 near Minneapolis.
