= Kenya–Sierra Leone relations =

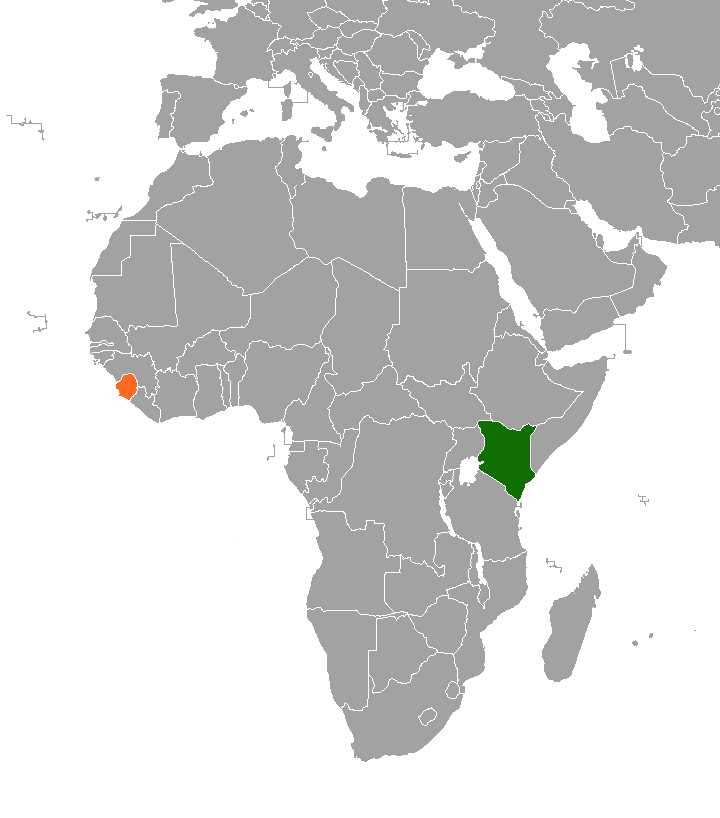
- Kenya: Sierra Leone

Kenya–Sierra Leone relations are bilateral relations between Kenya and Sierra Leone.

== Cooperation ==
Kenya is one of the African Union member states that contributed troops to the United Nations Mission in Sierra Leone (UNAMSIL) from 1995 to 2005. UNAMSIL's mission was to stabilise Sierra Leone and implement the Lome Peace Agreement. UNAMSIL's mission ended successfully in 2005.

== Ebola virus epidemic ==
During the Ebola virus epidemic, Kenya donated US$1 million to Guinea, Liberia and Sierra Leone. However, Kenya had also banned travellers from all three countries during the ebola crisis. The ban also applied to travellers who had travelled through any of the three countries.

The national carrier, Kenya Airways, had also suspended flights to the West African nations.

During the ban, Sierra Leone threatened to review relations with Kenya and other African countries that isolated the ebola hit nations.

In January 2015, Kenya sent 170 health workers to Sierra Leone and Liberia assist the ebola stricken countries.

== Trade ==
Trade between both countries is considered to be minimal. In 2010 trade between both countries was worth Kes.55,854,210 (US$611,933). Kenya exported goods worth Kes.49,490,748 (US$542,215) to Sierra Leone. Therefore, trade between both countries is heavily in favour of Kenya.

Main goods that Kenya exports to Sierra Leone are medicaments, printed matter, tea and mate, textiles, paper, cosmetics and electronics.

Kenya's main imports from Sierra Leone include; Ores and concentrates of base metals, bearings, Furniture and parts of TV receivers.

== Diplomatic missions ==
- Kenya is accredited to Sierra Leone from its high commission in Abuja, Nigeria.
- Sierra Leone has a high commission in Nairobi.
