= Abidjan Peace Accord =

The Abidjan Peace Accord was a treaty signed in Abidjan, Côte d'Ivoire on 30 November 1996 to try to bring an end to the Sierra Leone Civil War (1991–2002). The two main signatories were President Ahmad Tejan Kabbah of Sierra Leone and Foday Sankoh, leader of the Revolutionary United Front (RUF) rebel group. However, Sankoh refused to honour the terms of the agreement, and Kabbah was forced into exile by a May 1997 military coup (though he regained power the following year), so the Accord failed to bring about peace.

== Background ==
The civil war began on 23 March 1991, when the RUF attempted to overthrow the government of President Joseph Saidu Momoh. A 1992 military coup saw Captain Valentine Strasser, barely 25 years old, seize power, but the fighting continued. Strasser himself would be ousted by Julius Maada Bio in 1996. Peace negotiations were pursued intermittently through the regime changes.

On 25 February 1996, delegations from both sides, along with United Nations Special Envoy Berhanu Dinka and representatives of the Organisation of African Unity and the Commonwealth, met in Abidjan for four days. On 25–26 March, Bio and Sankoh met face-to-face for talks in Yamoussoukro, Ivory Coast, under the auspices of that country's president, Henri Konan Bédié. Days later, Ahmad Tejan Kabbah was elected President of Sierra Leone. Kabba and Sankoh met on 22–23 April in Yamoussoukro and agreed to a ceasefire. Talks continued, though both sides accused the other of breaching the ceasefire. In October or November, Kabba again met with Sankoh, this time in Abidjan. Finally, on 22 November, the Abidjan Peace Accord was signed, the government having made concessions and the RUF having suffered severe military defeats.

== Goals ==
The accord had a broad range of goals, the main ones being:

- The armed conflict between the two main signatories was to end "with immediate effect."
- A National Commission for the Consolidation of Peace was to be established within two weeks of the signing.
- A Neutral Monitoring Group would consist of monitors drawn from the "international community".
- All RUF combatants would disarm, and amnesty would be granted them.
- Efforts would be made to reintegrate RUF rebels into society.
- The government-hired Executive Outcomes and other foreign troops would leave the country after the establishment of the monitoring group.

== Signatories ==
- Alhaji Dr. Ahmad Tejan Kabbah, President of the Republic of Sierra Leone
- Corporal Foday Saybana Sankoh, leader of the Revolutionary United Front
- Henri Konan Bédié, President of the Republic of Côte d'Ivoire
- Berhanu Dinka, Special Envoy of the United Nations Secretary-General for Sierra Leone
- Adwoa Coleman, representative of the Organization of African Unity
- Moses Anafu, representative of the Commonwealth Organization

== Results ==
The National Commission for the Consolidation of Peace was set up, but accomplished little or nothing. The Neutral Monitoring Group was supposed to number 700, but the RUF objected, proposing it consist of only 120 monitors, and agreement could not be reached. Then RUF spokesmen and supporters of the Commission for the Consolidation of Peace, Fayia Musa, Ibrahim Deen-Jalloh and Philip Palmer, attempted to overthrow Sankoh as leader of the RUF after Sankoh was arrested in Nigeria. The three were captured by RUF forces, and Sankoh consolidated power in the RUF. A military coup on 25 May 1997 by Johnny Paul Koroma, leader of the newly formed Armed Forces Revolutionary Council, resulted in an alliance with the RUF. This was certainly the death knell for any hope of peace stemming from the Abidjan Accord.
