= Fitsum Arega =

Ethiopian diplomat

- ፍፁም አረጋ
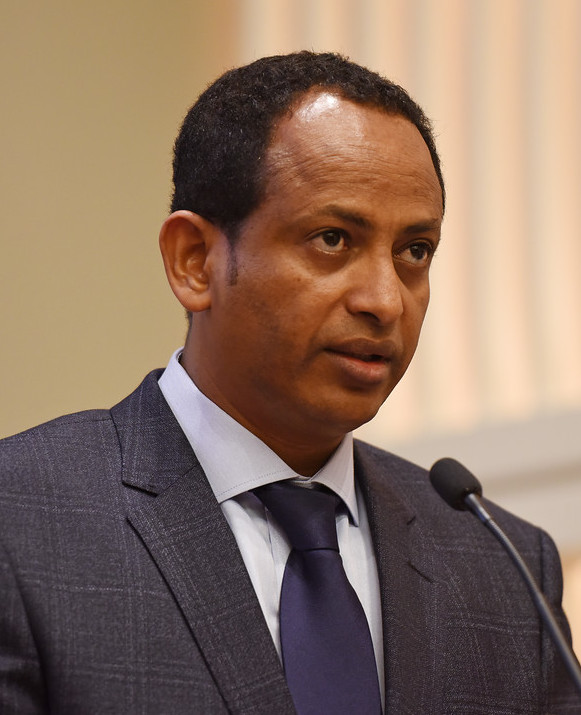
- Fitsum in 2020

Ambassador of Ethiopia to Canada
- Incumbent
- Assumed office September 2022
- Prime Minister: Abiy Ahmed

Director General of the Ethiopian Investment Commission
- In office 5 November 2018 – 24 December 2018
- Succeeded by: Abebe Abebayehu

Chief of Staff of Prime Minister of Ethiopia
- In office 26 April 2018 – 5 November 2018
- Succeeded by: Shimelis Abdisa

Director General of the Ethiopian Investment Commission
- In office February 2013 – 25 April 2018
- Preceded by: Belachew Mekuria
- Succeeded by: Belachew Mekuria

Ambassador of Ethiopia to the United States
- In office 10 April 2019 – September 2022

Personal details
- Born: Addis Ababa, Ethiopia
- Education: University of Manchester (M.A.); Open University (M.B.A); University of Birmingham (PgD)

Fitsum Arega Gebrekidan (Amharic: ፍፁም አረጋ ገብረኪዳን) is an Ethiopian diplomat who is the current Ethiopian Ambassador to Canada. He was the Director General of the Ethiopian Investment Commission and the Chief of Staff of the Prime Minister of Ethiopia and also served as Ethiopia's Ambassador to the United States. He presented his credentials to Governor General of Canada Mary Simon in September 2022.

== Early life and education ==
Fitsum was born and raised in Addis Ababa, and received his higher education in the United Kingdom. He attended the University of Manchester, where he received a master's degree in Development Economics and Policy Management. He later received an MBA degree from Open University (OU) Business School, as well as a Doctor of Philosophy (PhD) from the University of Birmingham.

== Diplomatic career ==
=== Grand Ethiopian Renaissance Dam ===
In 2020, Fitsum opposed reported plans by the United States government to cut funding to Ethiopia over the Grand Ethiopian Renaissance Dam (GERD). He described the dam as a project that "will pull Ethiopia out of darkness".

Fitsum celebrated reports that the U.S. would restore aid to Ethiopia in February 2021, reiterated his support for the GERD. Fitsum claimed it would help provide electricity to 60 million people and boost environmental efforts.

=== American Ethiopian Public Affairs Committee ===
In 2021, Fitsum announced the establishment of the American Ethiopian Public Affairs Committee (AEPAC). The stated purpose of the newly-formed organization is to entrench the bilateral relationship between the United States and Ethiopia.
