= Berhane Gebre-Christos =

Ethiopian politician (born 1953)

- ብርሃነ ገብረ ክርስቶስ
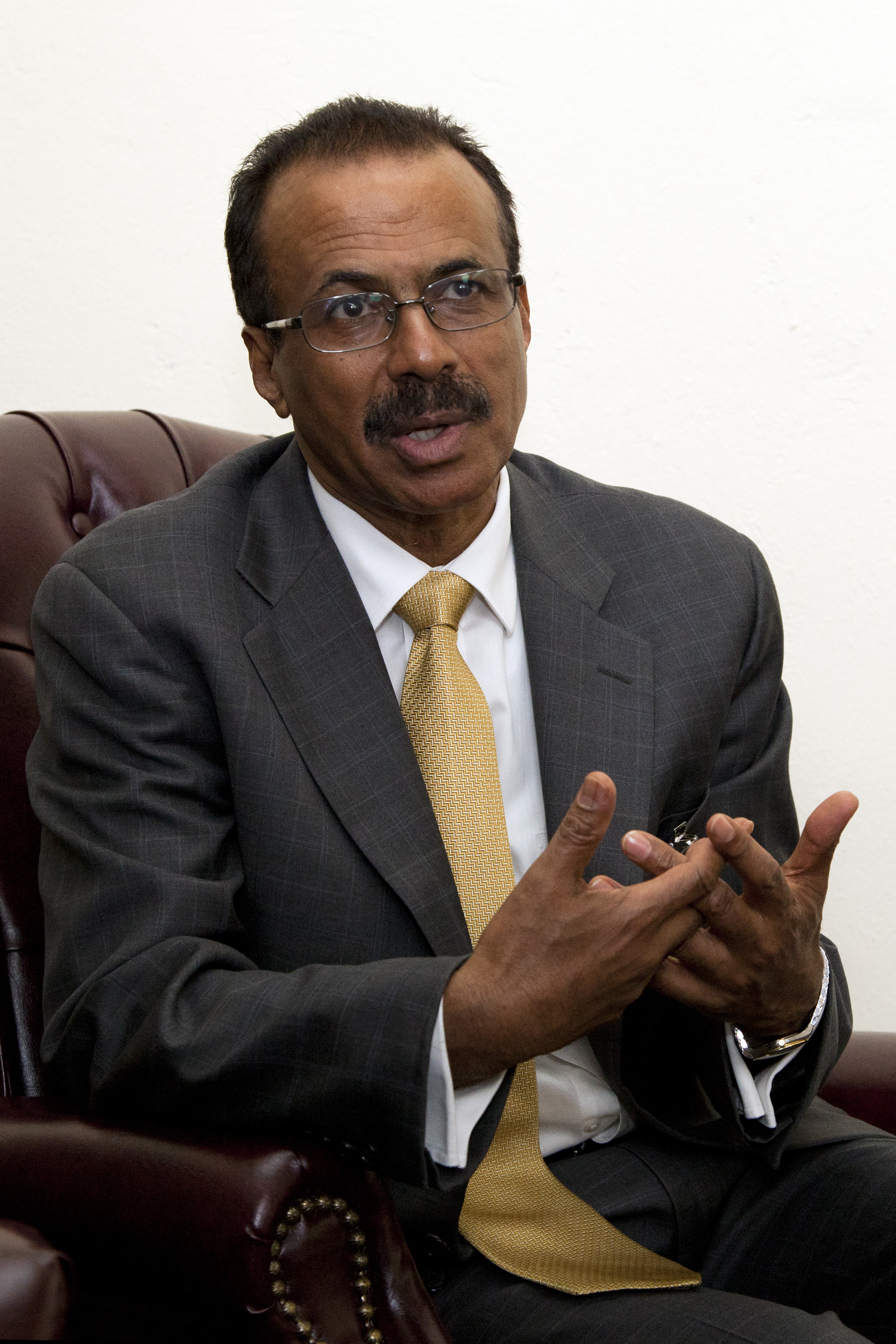

Ambassador to China and North Korea
- In office 19 August 2017 – 25 October 2018
- Prime Minister: Meles Zenawi; Hailemariam Desalegn; Abiy Ahmed
- Preceded by: Seyoum Mesfin
- Succeeded by: Teshome Toga

Ambassador of Ethiopia to the United States
- In office 1992–2002
- Succeeded by: Kassahun Ayele

Ambassador to the European Union and Benelux
- In office 2002–2010

Minister of Foreign Affairs
- In office 2010–2012
- Preceded by: Hailemariam Desalegn
- Succeeded by: Tedros Adhanom

Foreign Spokesperson for the Tigrayan People's Liberation Front
- In office 1979 – January 1988

Personal details
- Born: 1953 (age 72–73) Mekelle, Tigray Province, Ethiopian Empire
- Party: EPRDF
- Other political affiliations: TPLF
- Education: Haile Selassie I University, University of Amsterdam

Berhane Gebre-Christos (Tigrinya: ብርሃነ ገብረ ክርስቶስ; born 1953) is an Ethiopian politician. He served as the Minister of Foreign Affairs from 2010 to 2012. He was also the Foreign Spokesperson for the Tigray People's Liberation Front (TPLF) from 1979 to 1988.

== Early life ==
Berhane was born in 1953 in Mekelle, Ethiopia and attended General Wingate High School and subsequently the Haile Selassie I University (now Addis Ababa University) from 1971 to 1974. Berhane also holds a master's degree in International Relations from the University of Amsterdam. He is married and has three children.

== Political career ==
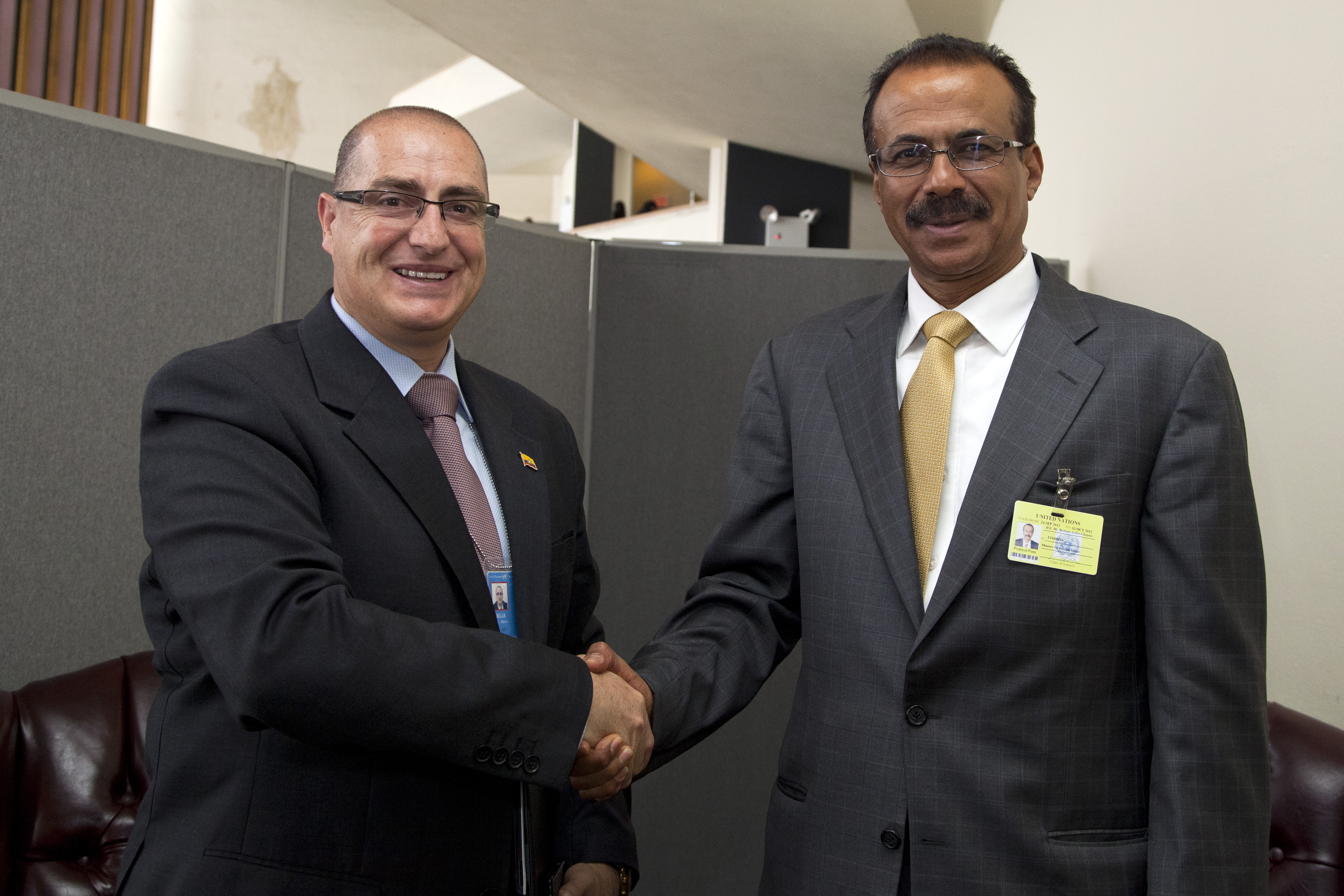
Berhane Gebre-Christos meeting with Vice Chancellor of Ecuador Marco Albuja Martinez.

Berhane joined the TPLF in 1976. From 1977 to 1979, Berhane was responsible for administration and marshalling mass organisations for the front. After serving as Foreign Spokesperson, in 1983 he was elected to the leadership of the TPLF, and between 1988 and 1991 he headed the diplomatic mission in the Ethiopian Peoples' Revolutionary Democratic Front Foreign Relations Bureau. In this capacity, Berhane traveled throughout Europe, Asia, Africa, Canada and the United States and met with government officials, media, and the public, representing the interests of the TPLF.

After the fall of the Derg, Berhane was appointed Ambassador to the United States, a post he held from 1992 to 2002. This was a particularly important position as Ethiopia had not held diplomatic relations with the United States since 1978. From 2002 to 2010, Berhane served as Ambassador of Ethiopia to the European Union and Benelux (the Kingdom of Belgium, the Grand Duchy of Luxembourg and the Kingdom of the Netherlands). Upon returning to Ethiopia, he was appointed State Minister for Foreign Affairs in October, 2010.

Berhane is a member of the Delegation of Think Tank Scholars of Developing Countries and meet with the Vice Foreign Minister of China on 24 March 2017 to discuss Ethiopia-China cooperation and relations.

Berhane was appointed the Ambassador to China in August 2017. On December 5 of the same year, he presented his credentials to Xi Jinping along with other newly appointed ambassadors.

On 27 June 2018 Berhane presented his credentials to Kim Yong Nam as non-resident ambassador to the DPRK.

== See also ==
- Ethiopia – United States relations
