= United Nations Security Council Resolution 1220 =

UN Security Council Resolution 1220
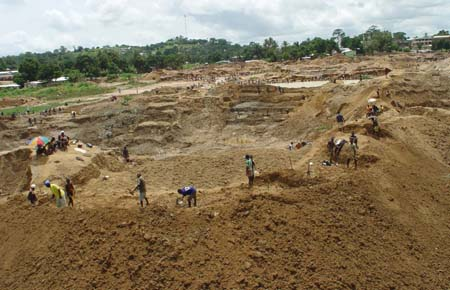
- Diamond mine in Sierra Leone
- Date: 12 January 1999
- Meeting no.: 3,964
- Code: S/RES/1220 (Document)
- Subject: The situation in Sierra Leone
- Voting summary: 15 voted for; None voted against; None abstained
- Result: Adopted

Security Council composition
- Permanent members: China; France; Russia; United Kingdom; United States
- Non-permanent members: Argentina; Bahrain; Brazil; Canada; Gabon; Gambia; Malaysia; Namibia; Netherlands; Slovenia

United Nations Security Council resolution 1220, adopted unanimously on 12 January 1999, after recalling Resolution 1181 (1998) on the situation in Sierra Leone, the Council extended the mandate of the United Nations Observer Mission in Sierra Leone (UNOMSIL) until 13 March 1999.

The security council expressed concern over the deterioration of the situation in Sierra Leone and encouraged efforts to resolve the conflict for lasting peace and stability. It took note of the Secretary-General Kofi Annan's intention to reduce the number of military observers in UNOMSIL; a small number would remain in Conakry, the capital of nearby Guinea, and would return together with support staff when conditions had improved.

Finally, the secretary-general was requested to report back to the council by 5 March 1999 with recommendations on the future deployment of UNOMSIL in Sierra Leone.

== See also ==
- History of Sierra Leone
- List of United Nations Security Council Resolutions 1201 to 1300 (1998–2000)
- Sierra Leone Civil War
