= Ambaye Wolde Mariam =

Ethiopian politician and aristocrat (1900–1954)

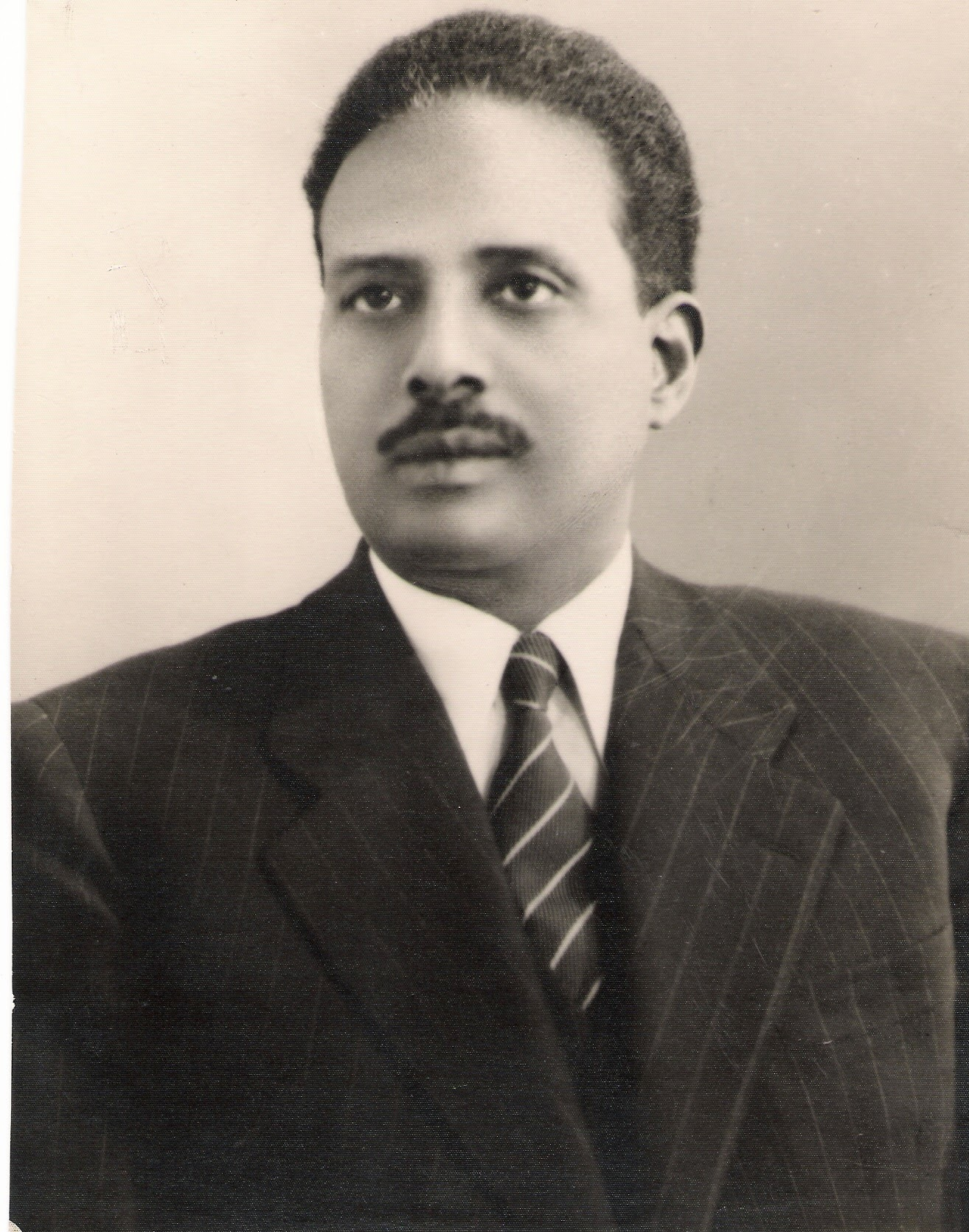
- Born: 15 October 1906; Keren, Italian Eritrea
- Died: 16 May 1954 (aged 47); Addis Ababa, Ethiopian Empire

Minister of Foreign Affairs
- In office 1953–1953
- Monarch: Haile Selassie I
- Preceded by: Aklilu Habte-Wold
- Succeeded by: Yilma Deressa

Ambaye Wolde Mariam (15 October 1906 – 16 May 1954), also known as Dr. Ambaye, was an Ethiopian politician under Emperor Haile Selassie. He was the political and legal advisor to the Duke of Harar in 1935, Vice Minister of Justice in 1942, Vice Foreign Minister in 1946, Minister of Justice in 1947 and Minister in the Prime Minister's Office (without a portfolio) in 1952. He was Foreign Minister (acting) in 1953 until shortly before his death.

== Life ==
Ambaye was born in Keren in 1906.

At an early age, he joined the Catholic seminary where his grandfather had taken shelter when he moved to Keren. Due to his outstanding academic achievement at the seminary, he was selected to attend the Pontifical Ethiopian College. He later studied law at the University of Paris, France.

In the late 1920s and early 1930s Crown Prince Haile Selassie toured Europe and made diplomatic contacts with European governments. While touring he also wisely expanded his network by meeting educated Eritreans and Ethiopians. During one of these trips, Crown Prince Haile Selassie had a prudent meeting at the Vatican with Ambaye, who was ready to be ordained as a Catholic priest. At a crucial moment in Ethiopia's history, the Crown Prince noticed Ambaye's potential and recruited him to help build a modern government. Realizing the opportunity to struggle for the liberation of Eritrea from Italian colonialism, Ambaye joined the Imperial Government of Ethiopia. The Emperor awarded him a scholarship for further higher education at the University of Paris Law School.

In 1935, during the Italian occupation, Dr. Ambaye joined the Emperor into exile, first to Djibouti and then to Cairo via Khartoum. On behalf of the exiled Ethiopian government, he participated in anti-fascist political activities. He represented the Emperor, acting as both a decision maker and political activist in the Middle East. His expertise spanned across contacts in Tokyo, Japan; in 1936, he served for one year as the emperor's unofficial diplomatic emissary to the Imperial Government of Japan.

After the defeat of the fascists, he returned to Ethiopia. He participated in modernizing the judicial system of Ethiopia. He worked closely with Blatengeta Lorenzo Taezaz (his schoolmate and mentor from the days at the Catholic seminary, in Keren) in international judicial matters. He was a signatory for the establishment of the International Court of Justice in The Hague, Holland. In 1946, he was assigned to present Ethiopia's claim to try fascist war criminals (Badoglio, Graziani etc..), to the UN War Crimes Commission. He was a member of the Anglo-Ethiopian Boundary Commission in 1947.

In 1945 Dr. Ambaye Wolde Mariam, Ato Aklilu Habte-Wold and Blatta Ephrem Tewoldemedhen represented Ethiopia as delegates and signatories on various committees for the establishment of the United Nations. UN Photo of Dr Ambaye (Ambai Wold-Mariam) signing the UN Charter in 1945.

Dr. Ambaye had many disagreements with the powerful Imperial Palace Authorities, of the time. One of the major disagreements was over the prospect of the division of Eritrea (Bevin-Sforza Plan). The British and the Palace Authorities entertained to divide Eritrea between Sudan (the lowlands) and Ethiopia (the highlands). Dr. Ambaye, whose family origin embraces the highlands (mother side: Meraguz, Serae,) and the lowlands (father side: Hamelmalo, Anseba) of Eritrea, was adamantly opposed to the idea of splitting the nation of Eritrea. He was very proud of his cultural patrimony. He attempted to resign from the government several times over this issue. It was his friend and next door neighbor, Ato Aklilu Habte-Wolde that persuaded him to stay the course

In the early fifties, Dr. Ambaye started getting ill. In 1953 when he was an Acting Foreign Minister, he suddenly became gravely ill. He died at the age of 46. The Imperial government had earlier sent him to Sweden for medical treatment.
