= Nzo Ekangaki =

Cameroonian politician, diplomat (1934–2005)

2nd Secretary-General of the Organisation of African Unity
- In office 15 June 1972 – 16 June 1974
- Preceded by: Diallo Telli
- Succeeded by: William Eteki

Personal details
- Born: 22 March 1934 Nguti, Kumba Division
- Died: 3 June 2005 (aged 71)

Nzo Ekangaki (22 March 1934 – 3 June 2005) was a Cameroonian political figure. He served as the Secretary-General of the Organisation of African Unity (OAU) from 1972 to 1974.

== Biography ==
Ekangaki was born in Nguti, Kumba Division. In the 1950s he wrote the books An Introduction to Eastern Kamerun, published in 1956, and To the Nigeria People, published in 1958. After studying in West Germany, he was elected to the Legislative Assembly of Cameroon in 1961, and he became a member of the National Federal Assembly when the two Cameroons were united; he was re-elected in April 1964. On 14 February 1962, he was named Deputy Minister of Foreign Affairs, and on 25 May 1965 he was named Minister of Labor. He served in the latter position until he was elected Secretary-General of the OAU during the 19th meeting of the Council of Ministers of the OAU on 15 June 1972 in Rabat, Morocco. He succeeded Diallo Telli of Guinea, who had served as Secretary-General of the OAU for 8 years.

Having fallen afoul of African leaders, Ekangaki resigned in 1974. Ahmadou Ahidjo, the President of Cameroon, was unhappy with both Ekangaki's independent style at the OAU and his resignation. Back in Cameroon, Ahidjo sent Ekangaki to work as Technical Adviser at the Ministry of Territorial Administration, a very minor post for someone so prominent; Ekangaki remained there from 1974 to 1985. Subsequently Ekangaki worked at the Presidency as Adviser for Administrative Affairs under President Paul Biya from 1985 to 1989.

Ekangaki died at Yaoundé on 3 June 2005 and was buried in Nguti on 25 June.
