= Hararghe =

Former province in eastern Ethiopia

Coordinates: 8°N 43°E

Location of Hararge within the Ethiopian Empire

Hararghe (Amharic: ሐረርጌ Harärge; Harari: ሀረርጌ፞ይ, هَرَرْݘٛىيْ,Harargêy, Oromo: Harargee, Somali: Xararge, حَرَرْگَِ) was a province of eastern Ethiopia with its capital in Harar.

== Etymology ==
Hararghe is derived from the root Harari term "Gey" which refers to the modern city of Harar. The term Hararghe was used to refer solely to the modern city of Harar prior to the invasion of the Harar Emirate by the Abyssinians in 1887.

== History ==
The region consisted mostly of the territory of the Emirate of Harar annexed by Menelik II in 1887. Including Ethiopia's part of the Ogaden, Haraghe was bounded on west by Shewa, northwest by Wollo Province, northeast by French Somaliland and on the east by Somalia. Originally however Hararghe included the Sidamo, Bale and Arsi Province until Haile Selassie split the provinces. Hararghe was the historical homeland of the Harla people and often synonymous with the region of Adal. French trader Alfred Barday states in 1885, it bordered the Awash River and was known as 'Banan Herer' (Harar plateau) in Somali.

Hararghe was altered as a result of Proclamation 1943/1, which created twelve taklai ghizats from the existing 42 provinces of varying sizes. A comparison of the two maps in Margary Perham, The Government of Ethiopia shows that Hararghe was created by combining the Sultanate of Aussa, the lands of the Karanle, Ogaden, Issa, Isaaq and Gadabursi with the 1935 provinces of Chercher and Harar.

In 1960, the province south of the Shebelle River was made into its own province, Bale. With the adoption of the new constitution in 1995, Hararghe was divided between the Oromia, Afar and Somali Regions, which was given a large part, and what remained was a tiny Harari.

== Inhabitants ==
The presence of humans in the region dates back to at least the Middle Bronze Age, as evidenced by the discovery of a dolmen in the Chercher area of Harar by French archaeologist Père Azaïs in 1931.

As per the account of Somali historian Mohammed Nuuh Ali, speakers of Ethio-Semitic languages migrated from their original area near the northern Awash River to Hararghe around the 1st millennium BC, where they came into contact with an ancient Cushitic-speaking population.

According to Ethiopian historian Dr. Lapiso Gedelebo, the early inhabitants of the region were the Harla, and the Semitic Harari are a derivative of them.

== Notable people ==
- Shewalul Mengistu (1944–1977), poet, songwriter, journalist and political activist
- Ketema Yifru (1929–1994), Foreign minister, key Ethiopian and African diplomat whose negotiation skills shaped the OAU's creation.
- Minasse Haile (1930–2025), Foreign minister, diplomat and politician

== See also ==
- History of Ethiopia
