= Secretary General of the Organisation of African Unity =

International body office (1963–2002)

The Secretary General was head of the Secretariat of the Organisation of African Unity.

== List ==
No.	Portrait	Chairperson	Took office	Left office	Country	Region
1		Kifle Wodajo	25 May 1963	21 July 1964	Ethiopia	East Africa
2		Diallo Telli	21 July 1964	15 June 1972	Guinea	West Africa
3		Nzo Ekangaki	15 June 1972	16 June 1974	Cameroon	Central Africa
4		William Eteki	16 June 1974	21 July 1978	Cameroon	Central Africa
5		Edem Kodjo	21 July 1978	12 June 1983	Togo	West Africa
6		Peter Onu	12 June 1983	20 July 1985	Nigeria	West Africa
7		Ide Oumarou	20 July 1985	19 September 1989	Niger	West Africa
8		Salim Ahmed Salim	19 September 1989	17 September 2001	Tanzania	East Africa
9		Amara Essy	17 September 2001	19 July 2002	Côte d'Ivoire	West Africa
