= Goshu Wolde =

Ethiopian politician

Minister of Foreign Affairs
- In office 1983–1986
- Preceded by: Feleke Gedle-Giorgis
- Succeeded by: Berhanu Bayeh

Personal details
- Born: 1942 (age 83–84) Gore, Ethiopia
- Party: COPWE; WPE
- Other political affiliations: Ethiopian Medhin Democratic Party
- Education: Harar Military Academy; Addis Ababa University (LL.B.); Yale Law School (LL.M.)

Goshu Wolde (Amharic: ጎሹ ወልዴ, born 1942) is a former Ethiopian Foreign Minister (1983–1986) who also worked as minister of education. In 1986, he resigned from the Mengistu Government in a letter sent from New York City to Ethiopian Head of State Mengistu Haile Mariam, in which he wrote that the revolution had deteriorated into "absolute dictatorship and cruelty". He then established himself in the United States in opposition to the Mengistu Government. In 1992, Wolde founded the Ethiopian Medhin Democratic Party in Washington, D.C. He made a speech to the US Senate Committee for Foreign Affairs in 1991. Wolde was the leader of two foreign-based movements, the shadowy Free Soldiers Movement and the Ethiopian Movement for Democracy, Peace and Unity.

== Early life ==
Goshu Wolde was born in 1942 in Gore, Illubabor Province, to a poor family. He completed his primary schooling in Gore and his secondary schooling in Addis Ababa. Wolde attended a military academy from 1960 to 1963 and was awarded the sword of honor as the top student in his military subjects. He received a Bachelor of Laws (LL.B.) from Addis Ababa University and later a Master of Laws (LL.M.) from Yale University. In 1979, Wolde served as the chairman of the National Literacy Campaign Coordinating Committee, which was formed by the Derg to combat the low literacy rate of Ethiopia in 1974.

== Minister of Foreign Affairs ==
At a United Nations meeting on African famine in Geneva in 1985, the then US Vice President, George H. W. Bush, negotiated the Food for the North Initiative with the then Ethiopian Foreign Minister Goshu Wolde. Wolde reportedly attributed Bush's criticism of the Ethiopian Government's famine relief efforts to personal political motivations. Wolde raised concerns that famine donations collected in Europe and America in the form of food, clothing, equipment and money were not reaching the Ethiopian Government. He asked that Western donations be provided to the Ethiopian Government directly instead of being routed through private agencies.

Following the rebel takeover in May 1991 by the EPRDF, Goshu Wolde warned that a lasting peace would not develop unless a broad transitional government was established in which the Amhara ethnic group was adequately represented.

== Exile ==
On 21–22 March 1992, the Ethiopian Movement for Democracy, Peace and Unity (EMDPU) led by Goshu Wolde was launched as a political organisation in exile, opposed to the EPRDF regime.

== See also ==
- 1983–1985 famine in Ethiopia
