= William Eteki Mboumoua =

Cameroonian politician and diplomat (1933–2016)

3rd Secretary-General of the Organisation of African Unity
- In office 16 June 1974 – 21 July 1978
- Preceded by: Nzo Ekangaki
- Succeeded by: Edem Kodjo

Personal details
- Born: 20 October 1933 Bonadibong, Douala, French Cameroon
- Died: 26 October 2016 (aged 83) Yaoundé, Cameroon

William Aurélien Eteki Mboumoua (20 October 1933 – 26 October 2016) was a Cameroonian political figure and diplomat. He had a long career as a minister in the government of Cameroon; from 1961 to 1968, he was Minister of National Education, and from 1984 to 1987, he was Minister of Foreign Affairs. Etéki Mboumoua was also Secretary-General of the Organisation of African Unity (OAU) from 1974 to 1978. Later Eteki Mboumoua was President of the Cameroon Red Cross.

== Career ==
Born in the Bonadibong section of Douala in 1933, Etéki Mboumoua studied in France during the 1950s. He was Prefect of Nkam and Sanaga-Maritime from 1958 to 1961—a tumultuous time for those areas—and was then appointed to the government as Minister of National Education on 20 October 1961. He remained in the latter post until 1968, holding the additional portfolios of youth, sports, and culture during that period. He was also a member of the executive board of UNESCO from 1962 to 1968, becoming its vice-president in 1967, and he was President of the UNESCO General Conference from 1968 to 1970.

Etéki Mboumoua was Special Adviser to President Ahmadou Ahidjo from 1971 to 1973. Following the 1974 resignation of Nzo Ekangaki, a fellow Cameroonian, as Secretary-General of the OAU, Ahidjo proposed Etéki Mboumoua as a candidate for that office. At an OAU meeting in Mogadishu in June 1974, the OAU's election process became deadlocked between a candidate from Somalia and a candidate from Zambia, with neither of them able to secure a two-thirds majority; as a result, Etéki Mboumoua was unanimously elected as a compromise choice.

After Somalia invaded Ethiopia in July 1977, the OAU attempted to mediate the situation in August, but the Somali government refused to participate, protesting the exclusion of its allies, the Western Somali Liberation Front (WSLF). Etéki Mboumoua stated that the OAU did not consider the WSLF a true liberation movement; the Somalis in turn criticised the OAU for allegedly failing to promote African liberation.

Etéki Mboumoua remained Secretary-General of the OAU until 1978, when he was succeeded by Togo's Foreign Minister, Edem Kodjo. He served again as Special Adviser to President Ahidjo from 1978 to 1980 and then as Minister for Special Duties under the President from 1980 to 1984. Etéki Mboumoua retained his post after Ahidjo resigned and was succeeded by Prime Minister Paul Biya; he was considered a close associate of Biya, and on 7 July 1984, Biya appointed him as Minister of Foreign Affairs.

In what was viewed as a surprising decision, Biya dismissed Etéki Mboumoua from the government in January 1987. No specific reason was given, but Etéki Mboumoua was accused of "grave fault". When asked in an interview why he had dismissed Etéki Mboumoua, Biya replied that, as president, he had "absolute discretion" to dismiss state officials "without having to give explanations to anyone". It was speculated that Etéki Mboumoua was dismissed because he had objected to the reestablishment of diplomatic relations between Cameroon and Israel in 1986. Given Etéki Mboumoua's exceptional prominence, his sudden dismissal reportedly rattled the political elite.

After leaving political office, Etéki Mboumoua moved to humanitarian work, becoming President of the Cameroon Red Cross (CRC). He also continued to engage in some diplomatic activity; in 1995, the OAU appointed him to mediate the political situation in the Comoros.

At a Red Cross event in Bertoua on 3 August 2007, Etéki Mboumoua discussed the dire effects of illegal migration; he highlighted the role of such migration in destabilising nations and regions when it involved Africans fleeing to neighbouring African countries to escape violence in their own countries. According to Etéki Mboumoua, only African unity in the form of a United States of Africa could ultimately address the problem.

Speaking on 30 January 2009, he called for donations to the CRC's emergency relief fund. Etéki Mboumoua explained that his organisation did not receive anywhere near an adequate level of funding from the state and that aid from other sources tended to arrive too late to be properly used in an emergency situation, so the organisation had set up its emergency relief fund in 2008. He urged donations to enable the CRC to have sufficient funds available to promptly address emergency situations.

He died at a hospital in Yaoundé on 26 October 2016 at the age of 83.

== Other activities ==
Etéki Mboumoua published two books in the 1970s: A Certain Humanism (Un certain humanisme, 1972) and Democratizing Culture (Démocratiser la culture, 1974).
