= Samuel Assefa =

Ethiopian academic and diplomat

12th Ambassador of Ethiopia to the United States
- In office 11 May 2006 – 19 November 2009
- President: Girma Woldegiorgis
- Preceded by: Kassahun Ayele
- Succeeded by: Girma Birru

Samuel Assefa is an Ethiopian academic and diplomat who served as the Ambassador of Ethiopia to the United States from 11 May 2006 and ended it on 19 November 2009.

Samuel Assefa is the son of Assefa Lemma, the Ethiopian ambassador to Germany; Assefa Lemma held that position from 1961 to 1964 and again from 1970 to 1974. Samuel earned his bachelor's degree in philosophy and economics from Swarthmore College, and his doctorate in political science from Princeton University, where he afterwards taught.

Prior to becoming ambassador to the United States, Samuel Assefa served as vice president of Addis Ababa University. He was also a founding member of "Ethiopia Past and Future", an ad hoc group composed of ambassadors from leading donor countries and members of Ethiopian civil society that seeks to promote dialogue in the aftermath of the 2005 Ethiopian elections. Samuel Assefa has worked in the past with a variety of institutions dedicated to strengthening civil society, including the InterAfrica Group, Center for Peace, Democracy and Human Rights, African initiative for a Democratic World Order, the Heinrich Boll Foundation, and the Bonn International Center for Conversion. He was awarded the Goethe Medal in 2005 for his work in this area.

== See also ==
- Ethiopia – United States relations
- Ethiopian Embassy, Washington, D.C.
