= Kassahun Ayele =

Ethiopian diplomat

Kassahun Ayele Tesemma

Ambassador of Ethiopia to the United States
- In office June 19, 2002 – May 15, 2006
- Preceded by: Berhane Gebre-Christos
- Succeeded by: Samuel Assefa

Ambassador of Ethiopia to Germany of Ethiopia to Germany
- In office March 20, 2006 – March 3, 2009
- Preceded by: Hiruy Amanuel Gebreselassie
- Succeeded by: Kassa Gebre-Yohannes

Personal details
- Born: June 17, 1949 (age 77) Goba
- Children: three
- Education: Bachelor's degree in mechanical engineering from Haile Selassie I Addis Ababa University.; 1988 Master's degree in Tribology in Machine Design from Leeds University.

Kassahun Ayele Tesemma (born June 17, 1949) is a retired Ethiopian diplomat.

- From 1973 to 1983 he was an engineer at the sugar factory in Metehara.
- From 1983 to 1984 he was a member of the group of technical experts n Sugar .
- From 1984 to 1992 he was working as an engineer in the service of industrial projects.
- From 1992 to 1993 he served as director general of the Authority Project Development Studies.
- From July 1 and August 1993 he was responsible for the Office of Production Services and Support in the Office of the Prime Minister.
- In 1994 he was appointed member of the Central Committee of the Amhara National Democratic Movement.
- From August 1995 to June 19, 2002, was Minister of Trade and Industry.
- On March 26, 2002, was appointed ambassador to Washington, D.C., where he was accredited from June 19, 2002, to May 15, 2006.
- From March 20, 2006 to March 3, 2009 was ambassador in Berlin.
