= Berhanu Dinka =

Ethiopian diplomat

Special Representative for Burundi
- In office July 2002 – June 2004
- Secretary-General: Kofi Annan
- Preceded by: Jean Arnoult
- Succeeded by: Carolyn McAskie

Special Representative and Regional Humanitarian Adviser for the Great Lakes Region
- In office December 1997 – July 2002
- Secretary-General: Kofi Annan
- Preceded by: Position established
- Succeeded by: Ibrahima Fall (politician)

Special Envoy for Sierra Leone
- In office February 1995 – 1997
- Secretary-General: Boutros Boutros-Ghali
- Preceded by: Position established
- Succeeded by: Francis G. Okelo

Permanent Representative of Ethiopia to the United Nations
- In office 1984 – May 1986
- President: Mengistu Haile Mariam

Ethiopian Ambassador to Canada
- In office 1984 – May 1986
- President: Mengistu Haile Mariam

Ethiopian Ambassador to Djibouti
- In office 1980–1984
- President: Mengistu Haile Mariam
- Preceded by: Position established

Head of the Department of Africa and Middle East Affairs
- In office 1975–1980
- Minister of Foreign Affairs: Kifle Wodajo; Feleke Gedle-Giorgis

Personal details
- Born: 4 June 1935 Welega Province, Ethiopian Empire
- Died: 8 July 2013 (aged 78) New York City, US
- Education: American University; Johns Hopkins University
- Occupation: Diplomat; economist

Berhanu Dinka (Amharic: ብርሃኑ ዲንቃ; 4 June 1935 – 8 July 2013) was an Ethiopian diplomat. His distinguished diplomatic career spanned more than five decades, during which he held a number of senior portfolios in the Ethiopian Foreign Service, including as the first Ethiopian ambassador to Djibouti and as the permanent representative to the United Nations for Ethiopia, and as an official of the United Nations, including as Under-Secretary-General, Special Envoy for Sierra Leone, and Special Representative for the Great Lakes region and for Burundi.

== Early life and education ==
Berhanu was born in the former Welega Province of the Ethiopian Empire, on 4 June 1935. Educated in Ethiopia and the United States, he earned degrees in economics and politics. He held a Master of International Studies from American University in Washington, D.C., a certificate in policy analysis from the School of Advanced International Studies at Johns Hopkins University, and participated in the International Visitor Leadership Program of the United States Department of State.

== Career ==
Berhanu served as a career diplomat with the Ethiopian foreign service for twenty-seven years. Early on, he worked as diplomat at the Ethiopian embassies in Monrovia, Liberia; Cairo, Egypt; and Washington, D.C. under the government of Haile Selassie. Following the Ethiopian Revolution and installation of the Derg, he was promoted to the rank of ambassador as the head of the Department of Africa and Middle East Affairs within the Ministry of Foreign Affairs in 1975.

Berhanu was the first ambassador of Ethiopia to Djibouti, a portfolio he held during 1980 to 1984. In 1984, he became the permanent representative of Ethiopia to the United Nations, based in New York City, where he chaired the Special Committee on Decolonization. He was concurrently accredited as Ethiopian ambassador to Canada.

In May 1986, Berhanu was arrested and held as a political prisoner by the government of Mengistu Haile Mariam, after he was recalled from his assignment as ambassador to Canada and the United States. He was released, along with eighty-seven other political prisoners, in 1989. His release took place just five days before peace talks were due to begin in Atlanta, officiated by former U.S. President Jimmy Carter, between the Mengistu Haile Mariam regime and Eritrean rebels.

=== United Nations ===
Berhanu joined the United Nations as an official in 1992. He held several senior posts at the United Nations, including positions based in Cambodia, South Africa and Somalia. Berhanu served as the Special Envoy of the Secretary-General of the United Nations for Sierra Leone from 1995 to 1997; special representative of the Secretary-General for the Great Lakes region of Central Africa from 1997 to 2002; and special representative of the Secretary-General for Burundi from 2002 to 2004.

Berhanu was promoted to Under-Secretary-General of the United Nations. He served as the UN's representative at negotiations held in Arusha, Tanzania, as well as peace talks in Lusaka, Zambia, which were aimed at ending the conflicts in the Democratic Republic of the Congo. The African Union asked him to serve as the chairman of the Power-Sharing Commission, which concluded with the signing of the Darfur Peace Agreement in March 2006 in Abuja, Nigeria.

Former President of Kenya Mwai Kibaki appointed Berhanu to The Truth, Justice and Reconciliation Commission of Kenya, which was formed in 2008.

Berhanu died of cancer in New York City on 8 July 2013 at the age of 78. He was remembered by former UN Secretary-General Kofi Annan as "an outstanding public servant" and person of "professionalism and integrity."
