= Yilma Deressa =

Ethiopian politician (1907–1979)

Minister of Foreign Affairs
- In office 1958–1960
- Preceded by: Ambaye Wolde Mariam (acting)
- Succeeded by: Haddis Alemayehu

Minister of Finance
- In office 1957–1970
- Monarch: Haile Selassie
- Preceded by: Makonnen Habte-Wold
- Succeeded by: Mahtema Selassie Wolde Meskel

Personal details
- Born: 21 September 1907
- Died: January 1979 (aged 71)
- Spouse(s): Elsabet Workeneh; Kidist Tessema
- Education: London School of Economics

Yilma Deressa (21 September 1907 – January 1979) was an Ethiopian politician and a member of the Welega aristocracy. He served as Finance Minister (1957–1970) and Minister of Foreign Affairs (1958-1960), Ambassador to the United States, and member of the Ethiopian Senate. John Spencer includes him in his list of five public figures who occupied the most important posts in the two decades following the Second World War.

He was a member of the Welega aristocracy of southwestern Ethiopia. Yilma's father, Blatta Deressa Amante, whom Bahru Zewde describes as "perhaps the most prolific contributor to the weekly forum of the educated elite, Berhanena Selam" a newspaper, in the 1920s, was a cousin of Dejazmach Kumsa Moroda, the last king of Leqa Naqamte, Moti Moroda Bekere. Blatta Deressa was also a successful businessman, and served as a director in the Ministry of Agriculture in the 1930s, and after returning from exile in Sudan in 1941, Blatta Deressa acquired a reputation as an Oromo oral historian.

== Career ==
Yilma was educated at the London School of Economics, becoming a member of the Ethiopian pre-war intelligentsia; according to Spencer he was both fluent and eloquent in English, speaking it at home with his wife Elizabeth, and along with Dejazmach Zewde Gebre Selassie was the only member of his generation "who attempted to keep up with current literature" in his field. Following the defeat of the Ethiopian armies in the Second Italo-Abyssinian War, he became a member of the Black Lions, but surrendered with Ras Imru Haile Selassie near the Gojeb River 19 December 1936. Because he was interned on Ponza with Ras Imru, he avoided the murderous retribution following the attempted assassination of Rodolfo Graziani on 19 February 1937.

After the restoration of Emperor Haile Selassie, Yilma was appointed vice minister of Finance with, according to Margery Perham, "no minister being appointed over him." Perham notes that his new role involved significant challenges: "It may well be imagined that it was hard work to build a new system of public finance upon the old medieval foundations, which were still cluttered up with the wreckage of the Italian structure." Nevertheless, Perham notes, "A staff was collected; something like a school of accountancy was set up and the British advisers compiled and expounded a set of financial regulations. Moreover, as the British advisers could not speak Amharic and most of the Ethiopians could not talk English, the proceedings were made more difficult by the need of interpreters, especially as few of the required standard were available."

Yilma played an important role in Ethiopia-United States relations by recruiting George A. Blowers to help Ethiopia obtain a loan of 1.5 million ounces of silver from the United States in 1943. This metal was used to mint a new coin to replace the Maria Theresa Thaler and East African shilling, which would decrease its dependence on the British and give Ethiopia some relief from the effects of the oppressive Anglo-Ethiopian Agreement.

He died of cancer at age 71 in January 1979, in an Addis Ababa jail where he was imprisoned with other ministers and members of Haile Selassie's family.

== Personal life ==
He was married first to W/o Kidist Tessema with whom he had a daughter, Tsedale Yilma and second to W/o Elsabet Workeneh, with whom he had three daughters, Sophia Yilma, Hannah Yilma and Salome Yilma and two sons, Benyam Yilma and Fanuel Yilma. Sophia Yilma, became a politician.
