= Berhanu Bayeh =

Ethiopian former army officer and politician (born 1938)

- ብርሃኑ ባይህ

Minister of Foreign Affairs
- In office 1986–1989
- President: Mengistu Haile Mariam
- Preceded by: Goshu Wolde
- Succeeded by: Tesfaye Dinka

Personal details
- Born: 5 October 1935 (age 91) Gojjam, Ethiopian Empire
- Party: Workers' Party of Ethiopia

Military service
- Allegiance: Ethiopian Empire (Ethiopia) Derg
- Branch/service: Ethiopian Army
- Years of service: 1959–1991
- Rank: Lieutenant colonel
- Battles/wars: Eritrean War of Independence; Ethiopian Civil War

Berhanu Bayeh (Amharic: ብርሃኑ ባይህ; born October 5, 1935) is an Ethiopian former military officer and politician. He was the Minister of Foreign Affairs during the Derg regime from 1986 to 1989. Prior to that, he was chairman of the Derg's committee for legal affairs. Berhanu was a refugee resident of the Italian Embassy from May 1991 until December 2020, when he left the embassy.

== Biography ==
Berhanu was born in Gojjam and was of Amhara descent. In 1959 he entered Harar Military Academy as a cadet, and upon graduation was posted to the airborne division in Nazret. Two years later he attended Haile Selassie University, where he studied law. In 1967 he became a lecturer at Harar Military Academy. He joined the Armed Forces Coordination Committee in 1974.

As a captain, Berhanu joined the Derg as the representative of the military academy, where he became chairman of the legal committee, and was promoted to major in April 1976. In this new role, he toured a number of Arab countries in 1976 and stated they all supported the PMAC regime, although aid to Ethiopia from these counties ceased not long after. With Atnafu Abate, he managed to avoid the infamous Derg meeting of 3 February 1977, where a number of Derg leaders, including chairman Lieutenant General Tafari Benti, were killed in an ambush orchestrated by Mengistu Haile Mariam; the Ottaways assume that he "had apparently sided with Mengistu." In late February 1977, he was appointed chairman of the Foreign Affairs Committee. At the beginning of the Ogaden War, when the Soviet Union attempted to mediate peace between Ethiopia and Somalia, Birhanu secretly met with a Somali delegation in Moscow. He led also the Ethiopian delegation that facilitated the exchange of Ethiopian and Somali prisoners of war in 1988.

On 19 April 1983 Mengistu appointed him minister of labor and social affairs, and on 12 September 1984 he became a member of the Politburo of the Workers' Party of Ethiopia. On 26 October 1984, Berhanu was appointed chairman of the Aid Coordination Department of the Natural Disaster Relief Committee. He held periodic talks with Eritrean rebels that failed to accomplish much. He was named foreign minister in November 1986. In a cabinet reshuffle in October 1988, Berhanu was appointed president of the state council after Amanuel Andemikael defected to the United States.

Berhanu obtained safe haven in the Italian embassy after the Ethiopian People's Revolutionary Democratic Front army entered Addis Ababa on May 28, 1991. Also fleeing there were Tesfaye Gebre Kidan, the last acting president of the Derg/PDRE regime, Hailu Yimenu, the last acting prime minister, and chief of the general staff Adis Tedla. Hailu committed suicide later in 1991.

On 2 June 2004, Tesfaye died. It is rumoured that this is the result of an alleged brawl. Tesfaye had constantly accused Bayeh of being an enemy sympathizer, because Bayeh's wife is of Eritrean descent. According to this account, the death occurred after a physical brawl with Berhanu, when Tesfaye was accidentally hurt on his head from a glass cut and bled profusely. On 2 June 2004, he was taken to Menelik II Hospital where he was pronounced dead. However, an Italian diplomat later stated that Berhanu was not in any way involved in Tesfaye's death. Tesfaye's death came almost 13 years after he and Berhanu fled into the embassy.

Although Berhamu and Adis' continued presence in the embassy was a considerable embarrassment, the Italian government refused to give them up for trial since Ethiopia still has the death penalty. They were sentenced to death in absentia in 2008, but President Sahle-Work Zewde commuted their sentences to life imprisonment on 19 December 2020. After Attorney General Gedion Timothewos requested that a federal court grant Berhanu and Adis leniency on account of old age, the court voted to grant them parole on 24 December.
