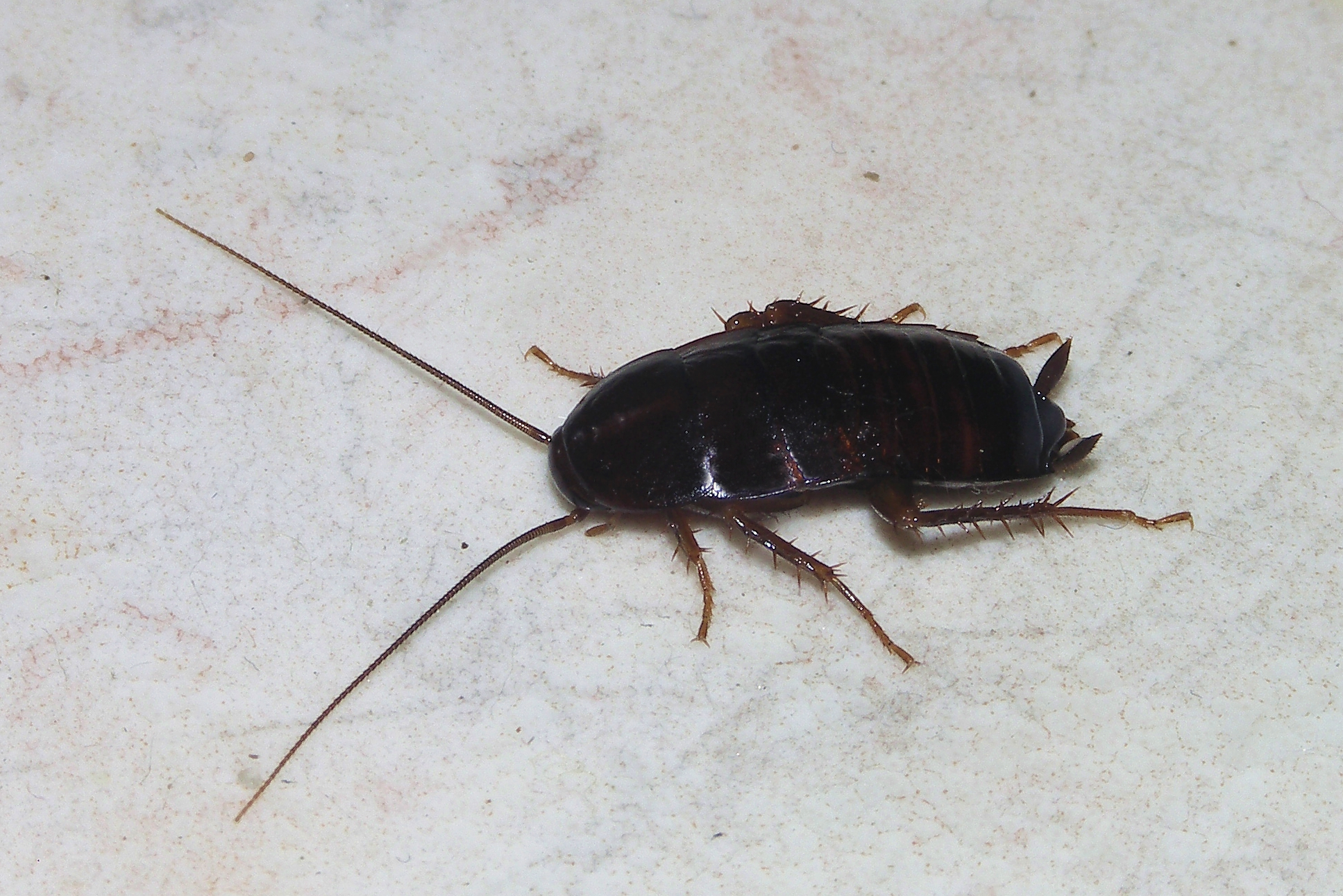
- Blatta orientalis

Scientific classification
- Kingdom: Animalia
- Phylum: Arthropoda
- Clade: Pancrustacea
- Class: Insecta
- Order: Blattodea
- Family: Blattidae
- Subfamily: Blattinae
- Genus: Blatta; Linnaeus, 1758

Species
- See text

Synonyms
- Kakerlac Latreille, 1825; Steleopyga Fischer, 1833; Stylopyga Fischer, 1846

= Blatta =

Genus of cockroaches

Blatta is a genus of cockroaches. The name Blatta represents a specialised use of Latin blatta, meaning a light-shunning insect.

== Species ==
Species include:

- Blatta furcata (Karny, 1908)
- Blatta orientalis Linnaeus, 1758 (Oriental cockroach)
