= Ketema Yifru =

Ethiopian diplomat and politician

Ketema Yifru (Amharic: ከተማ ይፍሩ; 12 December 1929 – 14 January 1994) was one of Ethiopia’s most influential 20th-century diplomats, statesmen, and technocrats. Rising from a rural farming background in Eastern Ethiopia, he became a key architect of Ethiopian foreign policy during the late Imperial era and played a foundational role in the creation of the Organization of African Unity (OAU) in 1963.

== Early Life and Background ==
Ketema was born in Gara Muleta, a mountainous region in Hararghe Province. Unlike most Ethiopian officials of the Imperial era, who came from aristocratic or urban elite families. Ketema’s background was humble and agrarian. His rise to power is widely regarded as a remarkable story of talent, discipline, and academic merit.

His early education occurred in local schools and later in government and missionary institutions that identified promising young students for scholarship opportunities abroad.

== Life and career ==
=== Education ===
Ketema was academically gifted and earned scholarships to the United States to Hope College (USA) – Bachelor of Arts, 1948–1951 and Boston University (USA) – Master of Arts in Political Science & International Relations, 1951–1952

He was fluent in Amharic, English, French, Italian

His formal training in Western political thought and international diplomacy later shaped Ethiopia’s foreign policy orientation in the post–World War II era.

=== Private Secretary to Emperor Haile Selassie (1958–1961) ===
Ketema’s return to Ethiopia marked the beginning of a rapid career ascent. His strong academic background, modern political training, and administrative talent led to his appointment as Private Secretary to the Emperor, a highly influential role granting access to key political decisions.

=== Minister of Foreign Affairs (1961–1972) ===
==== 1. Architect of the OAU (1963) ====
Ketema was one of the principal planners and negotiators behind the formation of the Organization of African Unity, the predecessor of the present-day African Union.

He played a major bridging role between The Casablanca Group and the Monrovia Group. His diplomacy helped prevent a split in African leadership and enabled the successful signing of the OAU Charter in Addis Ababa (May 1963).

==== 2. Strengthening Ethiopia’s International Role ====
Under Ketema’s leadership, Ethiopia expanded its embassies and foreign missions, became a leading African voice in the UN, hosted numerous international conferences, strengthened ties with both Western and African states and promoted Ethiopia as a mediator in African and global issues

=== Minister of Commerce, Industry & Tourism (1972–1974) ===
After more than a decade as Foreign Minister, Ketema was transferred to a key economic ministry, overseeing - industrial development, trade policy, investment promotion and tourism expansion efforts in pre-1974 Ethiopia. His work in this ministry was interrupted by the 1974 Ethiopian Revolution.

=== Imprisonment Under the Derg (1974–1982) ===
Following the fall of Emperor Haile Selassie, the military regime (the Derg) imprisoned many former ministers. Ketema was arrested without charges and spent eight years in prison under harsh conditions. He was released in 1982, with no charges ever formally filed.

=== United Nations and International Service ===
After release, Ketema left government life and joined the United Nations World Food Programme (WFP). His roles at the WFP was as Africa Policy Advisor (1985–1989) and Area Director for Eastern Africa (1989–1994). In these roles, he contributed to famine-relief strategies and food security policies during one of Africa’s most challenging humanitarian eras.

=== Death ===
Ketema Yifru died on 14 January 1994 in Addis Ababa from pancreatic cancer. He was survived by his wife, Woizero Rahel Senegiorgis, and their four sons. One of his son, Makonnen Ketema, has written and published a book titled Ketema Yifru: A Champion of Peace, Progress, and Pan-Africanism. The book explores the life of H.E. Ketema Yifru, tracing his early years, education, and the challenges he overcame to become a central figure in Ethiopian and African diplomacy, while highlighting his visionary strategies, commitment to Pan-Africanism, and enduring dedication to peaceful dialogue and international cooperation.

== Honours ==
- Knight Grand Cross of the Order of Orange-Nassau (Netherlands, 04/02/1969).
- Knight Grand Cross of the Order of Isabella the Catholic (Spain, 27/04/1971).

== Sources ==
- Aberra Jembere: "Kätäma Yefru", in: S. Uhlig (ed.): Encyclopaedia Aethiopica, vol. 3 (2007).

== See also ==
- List of honorary British knights and dames
