= Hilina Berhanu Degefa =

Ethiopian feminist activist

- Born: 1992 (age 33–34)
- Education: Addis Ababa University; SOAS University of London
- Occupations: Women's rights activisit; researcher

Hilina Berhanu Degefa (born 1992) is an Ethiopian feminist activist and researcher. She is a co-founder of The Yellow Movement, a youth-led feminist advocacy and empowerment program based in Addis Ababa and Mekelle University. She was a 2015 recipient of a Mandela Washington Fellowship for Young African Leaders, the youngest to receive the honor at the age of 22. Hilina is also a Women Deliver Young Leaders Fellow, class of 2020. She is the first Ethiopian civil society representative to brief the UN Security Council.

== Early life ==
Hilina earned a bachelor's degree in Law from Addis Ababa University. She earned a master's degree in Law and Gender from SOAS, University of London (the School of Oriental and African Studies), where she was a Governance and Development in Africa scholar, funded by the Mo Ibrahim Foundation.

== Career ==
In 2011, Hilina was a co-founder of The Yellow Movement, a youth-led feminist movement along with law department faculty member, Blen Sahilu, and fellow law student Aklile Solomon. The Yellow Movement creation was inspired by Aberash Hailay, an Ethiopian flight attendant whose eyes were gouged out by her jealous former husband earlier that year.

Hilina received a 2015 Mandela Washington Fellowship for Young African Leaders. Hilina also taught at Addis Ababa University, School of Law and later joined Mekelle University's Institute of Gender and Development as a lecturer and researcher. In March 2022, She published a research report on Gender and Violent Extremism under European Institute of Peace. In April 2022, Hilina became the first Ethiopian CS briefer to present before the UNSC.

== See also ==
- Women in Ethiopia
