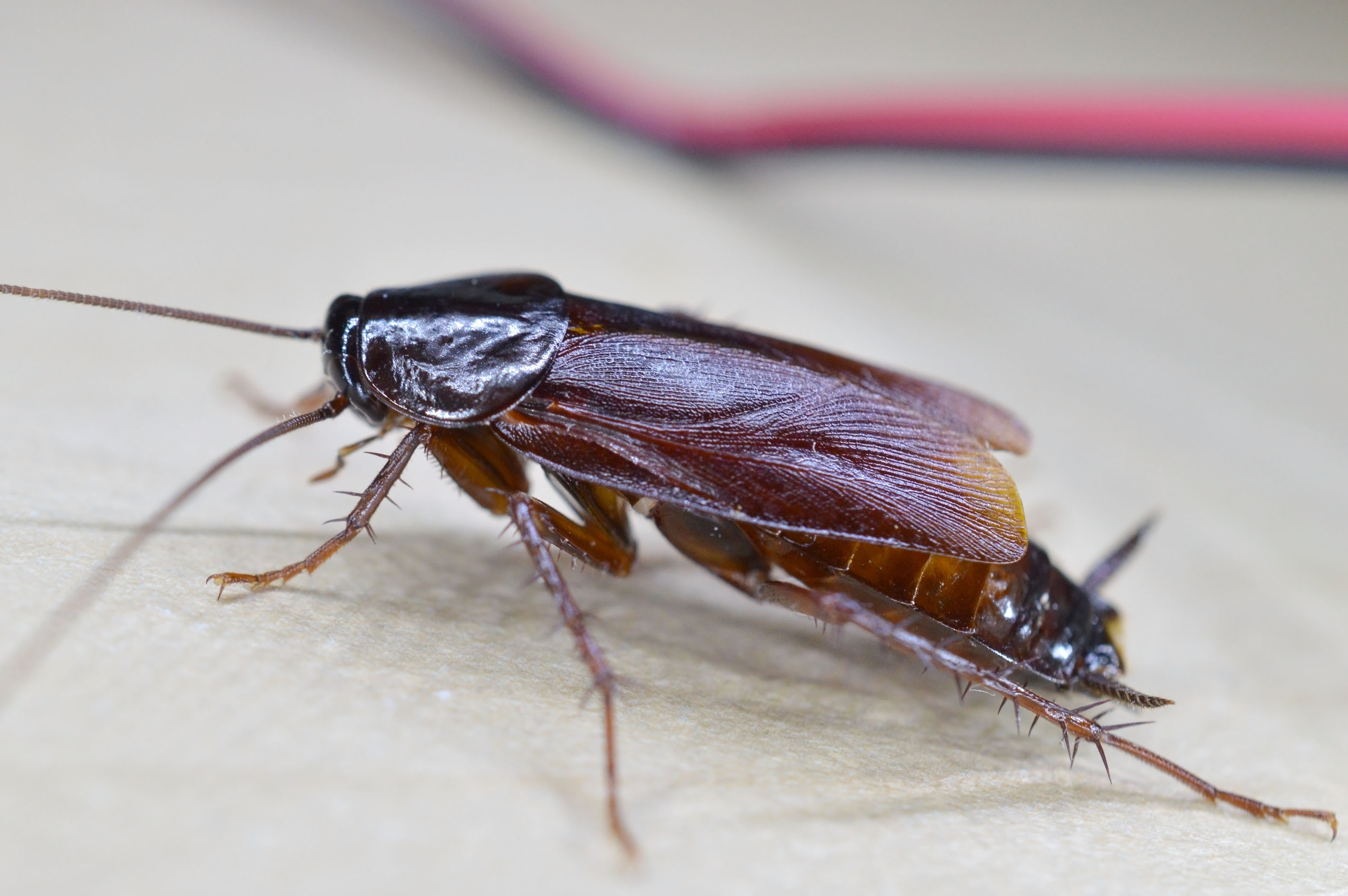
- Male

Scientific classification
- Kingdom: Animalia
- Phylum: Arthropoda
- Clade: Pancrustacea
- Class: Insecta
- Order: Blattodea
- Family: Blattidae
- Genus: Blatta
- Species: B. orientalis

Binomial name
- Blatta orientalis Linnaeus, 1758

Synonyms
- Blatta lucifuga Poda, 1761; Blatta secunda Schaeffer, 1769; Blatta tertia Schaeffer, 1769; Blatta culinaris De Geer, 1773; Blatta ferruginea Thunberg, 1810; Blatta europaea Bartsch, 1846 (Nom. Nud.); Kakerlac castanea Blanchard, 1851; Blatta hemialata Gistel, 1856; Pulex imperator Westwood, 1858 (Nom. Nud.); Blatta badia Saussure, 1863; Kakerlac pallipes Philippi, 1863; Kakerlac platystetho Philippi, 1863; Stylopyga orientalis spontanea Semenov-Tian-Shansky, 1909; Stylopyga orientalis gracilis Adelung, 1910

= Oriental cockroach =

Species of cockroach

The oriental cockroach (Blatta orientalis), also known as the waterbug (as they live in damp areas) or black cockroach (as their bodies are mostly dark), is a large species of cockroach, adult males being 18–29 mm (23/32–1 5/32 in) and adult females being 20–27 mm (25/32–1 1/16 in). It is dark brown or black in color and has a glossy body. The female has a somewhat different appearance from the male, appearing to be wingless at a casual glance, but is brachypterous, having non-functional wings just below her head. She has a wider body than the male. The male has long wings, which cover three quarters of the abdomen and are brown in color, and has a narrower body. Both of them are flightless. The female oriental cockroach looks somewhat similar to the Florida woods cockroach and may be mistaken for it. Originally endemic to the Crimean Peninsula and the region around the Black Sea and the Caspian Sea, its distribution is now cosmopolitan.

== Habitat ==
Oriental cockroaches tend to travel somewhat more slowly than other species. Often called "waterbugs" since they prefer dark, moist places, they can generally be found around decaying organic matter, in bushes, under leaf groundcover, or under mulch, and in sewer pipes, drains, basements, porches, and other damp locations in and around human habitations where they may be major pests.

== Adaptation ==
To thrive, cockroaches need a source of food/liquid and a place to hide, preferring warm places and relatively high humidity; the optimum temperature for oriental cockroaches is between 20 and 29 °C (68 and 84 °F). Female oriental cockroaches have vestigial tegmina (reduced fore wings) and males have longer tegmina. Oriental cockroaches are mainly nocturnal, and they can be elusive in that a casual inspection of an infested dwelling during the day may show no signs of roach activity.

== Life stages ==
=== Ootheca ===
Signs of cockroaches are their oothecae, which are "egg cases". The blackish-brown oothecae are formed a day after mating, and are deposited typically a day or two after formation (but up to seven days later), in a sheltered area or attached to a substrate by oral secretion. About 10–12 mm (13/32–15/32 in) long, with indistinct egg compartments housing 16–18 eggs, they are initially a yellow-white, turning reddish- then blackish-brown. They hatch on their own in about 42 days at 29.5 °C (85.1 °F) and 81 days at 21 °C (70 °F); at temperatures below 0 °C (32 °F) they lose viability.

=== Nymph and adult stages ===
Like all cockroach species, the immature nymph lacks wings. The adult form is sexually dimorphic; the male has prominent wings, however the female is brachypterous, having very small non-functional wings. The female is shorter and wider than the male.

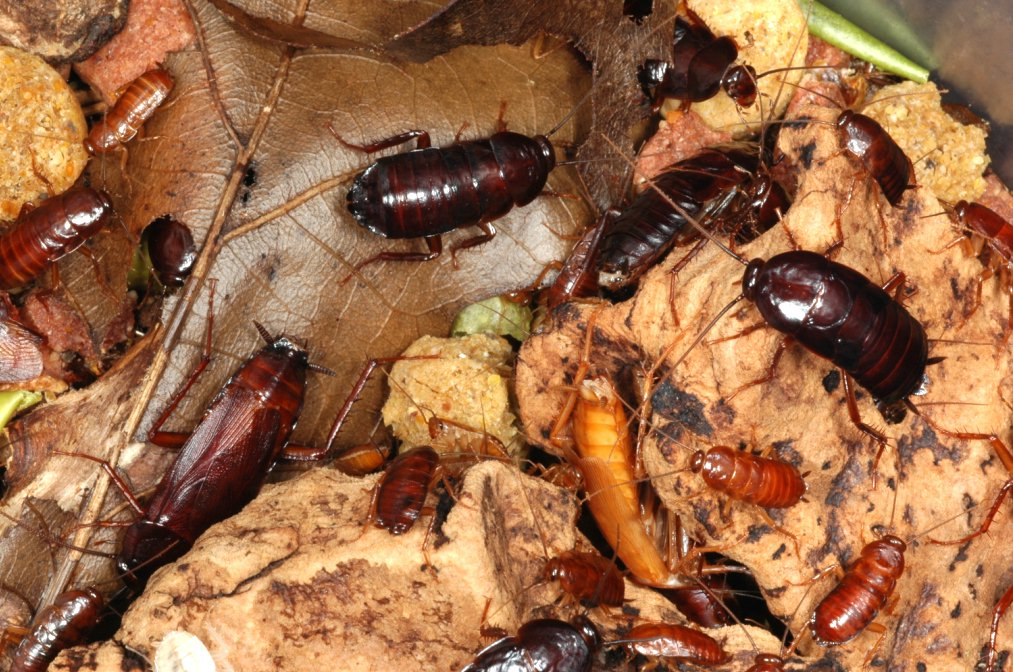
A colony, containing many different life stages

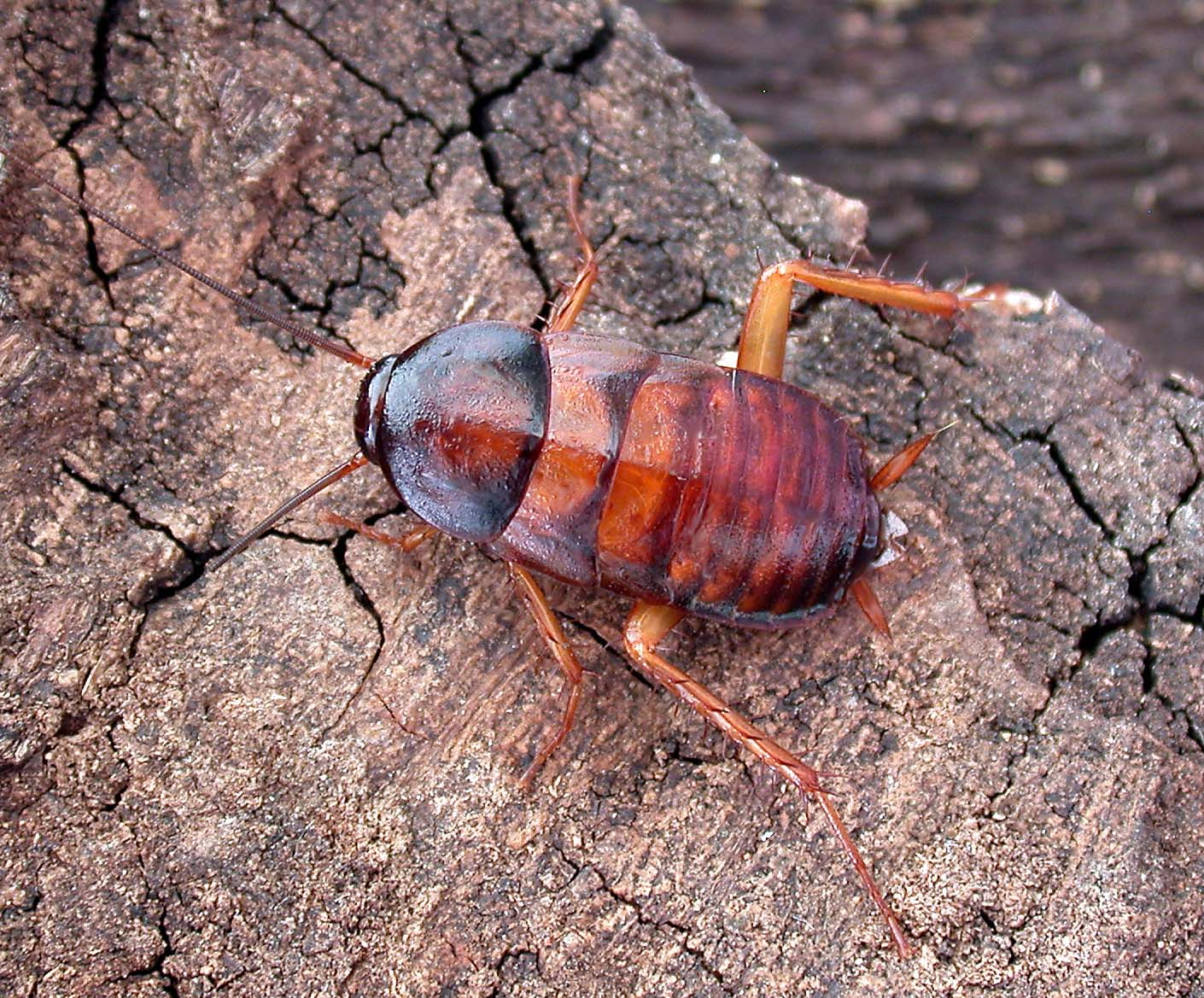
Nymph (immature stage with no wings)

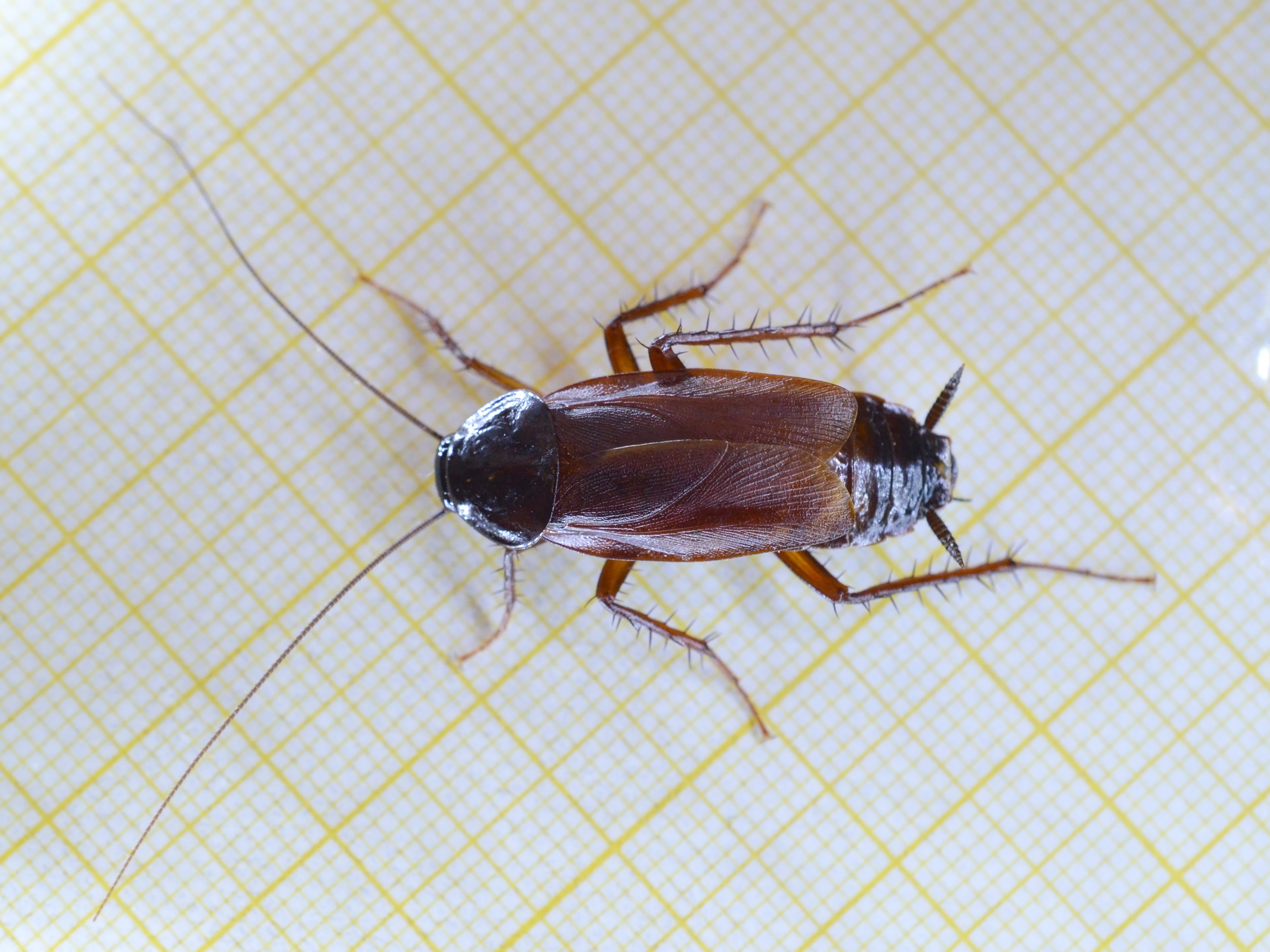
Adult male, with semi-functional wings

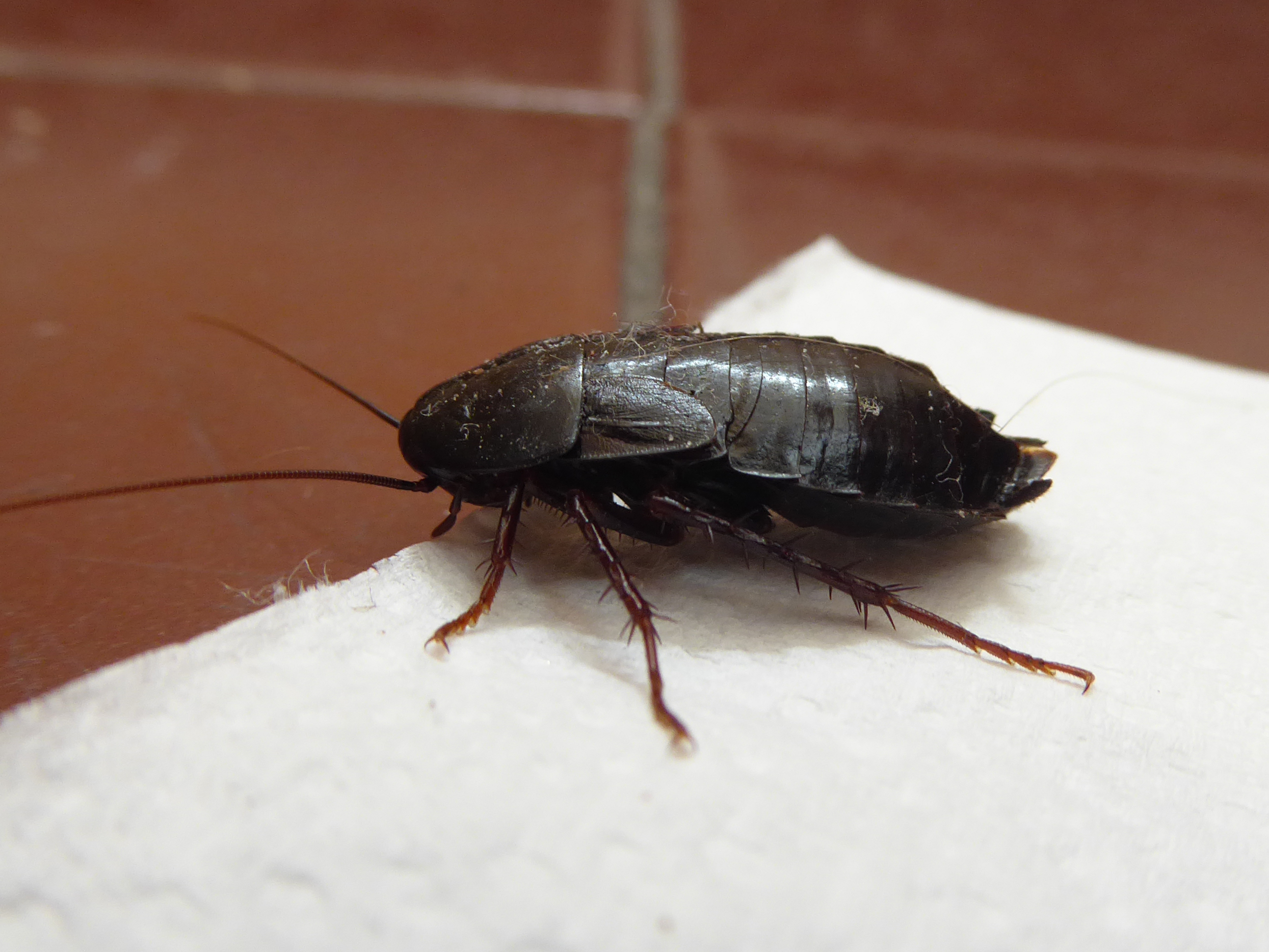
Adult female, with very short, non-functional wings

== Relationship with humans ==
Cockroaches transfer bacteria and viruses from their legs to food, dishes, utensils, and countertops and they are known to spread dysentery, E. coli, Salmonella, and food poisoning.

== Comparison of three common cockroaches ==
Roach	German cockroach	Oriental cockroach	American cockroach
Size	13–16 mm (1/2–5/8 in)	18–29 mm (23/32–1 5/32 in)	29–53 mm (1 5/32–2 3/32 in)
Preferred temperature	15–35 °C (59–95 °F)	20–30 °C (68–86 °F)	20–29 °C (68–84 °F)
Nymphal development (Note: Dependent on several factors, including temperature (significantly), sex, and nutrition.)	54–215 days (at 24–35 °C (75–95 °F))	164–542 days (at 22–30 °C (72–86 °F))	150–360 days (at 25–30 °C (77–86 °F))
Lifespan	Around 200 days	35–190 days	90–706 days
Able to fly?	No	No	Yes (Note: American cockroaches can fly short distances, usually starting from high places, but real flight is uncommon, despite popular belief.)
