= Welega Oromo people =

Subgroup of Oromo people

The Welega (also spelled Wallagga, Wallaga or Wal-arga) is a branch of the Oromo people who live in Oromia Region of Ethiopia, in the former Welega Province; a few live across the border in Sudan. They speak the Oromo language.

The Wellega population is approximately 8 million, many of them being Christians.

Wallaga is one of the fertile lands of Western Oromia and it is known for its coffee, honey, dairy products, gold, platinum and other natural resources among others.

== See also ==
- Mecha and Tulama Self-Help Association
