= United Nations Observer Mission in Sierra Leone =

- Abbreviation: UNOMSIL
- Formation: 13 July 1998
- Type: Peacekeeping Mission
- Legal status: Completed
- Headquarters: Freetown, Sierra Leone
- Head: Chief of Mission Francis G. Okelo Uganda Chief Military Observer; Brig. Gen. Subhash C. Joshi India
- Parent organization: United Nations Security Council

The United Nations Observer Mission in Sierra Leone (UNOMSIL) was a United Nations peacekeeping operation in Sierra Leone from 1998 to 1999 that was established with the passage of United Nations Security Council Resolution 1181. Its mission was to monitor the military and security situation in Sierra Leone. The mission was terminated in October 1999, when the Security Council authorized deployment of a new, and significantly larger peacekeeping operation, the United Nations Mission in Sierra Leone (UNAMSIL).

== Mandate ==
UNOMSIL's military element was to:

- Monitor the military and security situation in the country as a whole,
- Monitor the disarmament and demobilization of former combatants, as well as role of ECOWAS in the provision of security in the area,
- Assist in monitoring respect for international humanitarian law,
- Monitor the voluntary disarmament and demobilization of members of the Civil Defense Forces.

UNOMSIL's civilian element was to:

- Advise the Government of Sierra Leone and local police officials on police practice, training, re-equipment and recruitment, as well as to advise on the planning of the reform and restructuring of the Sierra Leone police force, and to monitor progress in that regard,
- Report on violations of international humanitarian law and human rights in Sierra Leone, as well as to assist the Government of Sierra Leone in its efforts to address the country's human rights needs.

== Background ==
The conflict in Sierra Leone started in March 1991 when fighters of the Revolutionary United Front (RUF) launched a war from the east of the country with support from the National Patriotic Front of Liberia to overthrow the government. The causes of this uprising were: government corruption and mismanagement that led to decades of extreme poverty, inequalities surrounding the diamond industry in Sierra Leone which highly favored the ruling class and easy access to soldiers in the form of Liberian refugees from the First Liberian Civil War who were often coerced into joining the RUF.

Sierra Leone's army, with the support of the Military Observer Group (ECOMOG) of the Economic Community of West African States (ECOWAS), tried at first to defend the government but, in April 1992 a military coup d'état by the National Provisional Ruling Council (NPRC) overthrew the government. Despite this successful coup, the RUF continued its attacks.

In November 1994, the Head of State of Sierra Leone addressed a letter to the United Nations Secretary-General, formally requesting his aid in facilitating negotiations between the Government and the RUF. In December 1994, the Secretary-General sent an exploratory mission to Sierra Leone to examine the situation. Based on the findings of the mission, the Secretary-General, appointed a Special Envoy to Sierra Leone in February 1995. This Special Envoy worked with Organization of African Unity (OAU) and ECOWAS to try to negotiate a settlement to the conflict and return the country to civilian rule.

As a result of these negotiations, parliamentary and presidential elections were held in February 1996, with Ahmad Tejan Kabbah being elected president. The RUF, however, did not participate in the elections and would not recognize the results. The conflict continued. A peace agreement between the Government and RUF was finally reached in November 1996 with the Abidjan Peace Accord. However, the agreement was derailed by another military coup d'état in May 1997. The military, in concert with the RUF, formed a ruling junta.

In response to the second coup, the Secretary-General appointed a new Special Envoy and the Security Council passed Resolution 1132 in October 1997, imposing an oil and arms embargo, as well as authorizing ECOWAS to ensure its implementation. In October 1997, ECOWAS and a delegation representing the chairman of the junta held talks and signed a peace plan which, among other things, called for a ceasefire to be monitored by ECOMOG and United Nations military observers, pending approval from the Security Council. However, the junta subsequently criticized key provisions and raised a number of issues, which meant the agreement was never implemented.

In February 1998, ECOMOG launched a military attack that led to the collapse of the junta and its expulsion from Freetown. In March 1998, President Kabbah was returned to office. In July 1998 the United Nations Observer Mission in Sierra Leone (UNOMSIL) was created by the Security Council to help facilitate peace. Despite the presence of UN Peacekeepers under the protection of ECOMOG troops, fighting continued with the rebel alliance gaining control of more than half the country.

In December 1998 the alliance began an offensive to retake Freetown, and in January 1999 overran most of the city. This led to the evacuation of UNOMSIL, with its size being downgraded. ECOMOG eventually troops retook Freetown and installed a civilian government. After these exchanges, the Special Envoy of UNOMSIL initiated a series of diplomatic efforts aimed at opening up dialogue with the rebels.

Finally, in July 1999, negotiations between the Government and the rebels in Lomé finished and all parties agreed to end hostilities and form a government of national unity. The agreement included commitments to end hostilities, reestablish the Commission for the Consolidation of Peace, provide for demobilization and disarmament, and aid in the reintegration of combatants into civil society. It also granted amnesty to all rebel combatants and allowed for the RUF to become a political party. To achieve these goals, it called for the UN Observer Mission in Sierra Leone (UNAMSIL) and ECOMOG to form a neutral peacekeeping force. The creation of UNAMSIL meant that UNOMSIL would be terminated.

== Contributions ==
The following countries provided uniformed personnel:

| Bangladesh | Bolivia | China | Croatia | Czech Republic | Denmark | Egypt |
| France | Gambia | India | Indonesia | Jordan | Kenya | Kyrgyzstan |
| Malaysia | Namibia | Nepal | New Zealand | Norway | Pakistan | Philippines |
| Russian Federation | Sweden | Thailand | United Kingdom | United Republic of Tanzania | Uruguay | Zambia |

== Financial Aspects ==
The total estimated cost for this mission was $53.6 million, before it was replaced UNAMSIL.

| 13 July 1998 to 30 June 1999 | $12.9 million |
| 1 July 1999 to 30 June 2000 (projection) | $40.7 million |

== See also ==
- United Nations Peacekeeping
- List of United Nations Peacekeeping Missions
- United Nations Mission in Sierra Leone
