= Ministry of Foreign Affairs (Ethiopia) =

Government ministry of Ethiopia

- Amharic: የውጭ ጉዳይ ሚኒስቴር
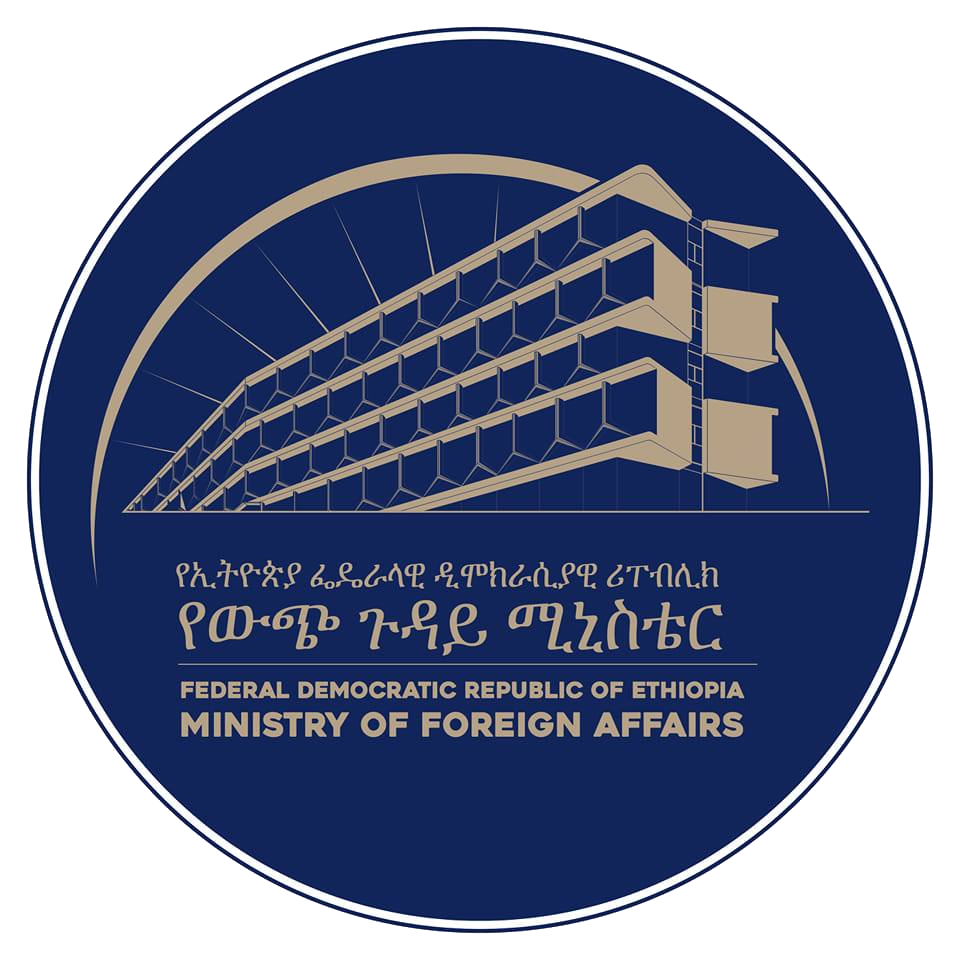

Agency overview
- Formed: 1907; 23 August 1995; 30 years ago (under current state)
- Jurisdiction: Ethiopian government
- Headquarters: Menelik II Ave, Addis Ababa, Ethiopia; 9.019158°N 38.762614°E
- Agency executive: Gedion Timotheos, State Minister
- Parent department: Office of the Prime Minister
- Website: www.mfa.gov.et

The Ministry of Foreign Affairs (Amharic: የውጭ ጉዳይ ሚኒስቴር, romanized: Yewich’i Gudayi Mīnīsitēri) is the Ethiopian government ministry which oversees the foreign relations of Ethiopia.

The current ministry was established 23 August 1995 with the passing of Proclamation 4-1995, which also established the other 14 original ministries. The current minister of foreign affairs is Gedion Timotheos since 18 October 2024.

The Ministry of Foreign Affairs is responsible for conducting the country's foreign policy and managing its diplomatic relations with other nations and international organizations.

Historically, the Ethiopian Ministry of Foreign Affairs has existed since the imperial era, but its organizational structure and functions have evolved over time. During the imperial period, the ministry coordinated Ethiopia's foreign relations under the emperor's direct supervision. Following the overthrow of the monarchy in 1974, Ethiopia went through various changes, including the establishment of a communist regime. The Ministry of Foreign Affairs continued its role but adapted to the new political order.

The Ministry of Foreign Affairs collaborates closely with the Prime Minister's Office and other relevant governmental agencies to shape Ethiopia's foreign policy objectives. It represents Ethiopia's interests in international arena, conducts negotiations and diplomacy on various issues, and handles matters related to international law, treaties, and agreements.

== List of ministers ==
This is a list of ministers of foreign affairs of Ethiopia:

- 1897–1907: Alfred Ilg
- 1907–1910: Negadras Haile Giyorgis Woldemikael
- 1910–1911: Negadras Yigezu Behabte
- 1912: Fitawrari Habte Giyorgis Dinagde
- 1912–1916: Dejazmatch Beyene Yimer
- 1916–1917: Ras Mulugeta Yeggazu
- 1917: Tsehafi Taezaz Wolde Meskel Tariku (acting)
- 1917–1930: Ras Tafari Makonnen
- 1930–1936: Blattengeta Heruy Wolde Selassie
- 1941–1942: Blattengeta Lorenzo Taezaz
- 1942–1943: Blattengeta Ephrem Teweldemedhin (acting)
- 1943–1958: Tsehafi Taezaz Aklilu Habte-Wold (acting to 1949)
- 1953: Ambaye Wolde Mariam (acting)
- 1958–1960: Yilma Deressa
- 1960–1961: Haddis Alemayehu
- 1961: Mikael Imru
- 1961–1971: Ketema Yifru
- 1971–1974: Minasse Haile
- 1974: Dejazmatch Zewde Gebre-Sellassie
- 1974–1977: Kifle Wodajo
- 1977–1983: Feleke Gedle-Giorgis
- 1983–1986: Goshu Wolde
- 1986–1989: Berhanu Bayeh
- 1989–1991: Tesfaye Dinka
- 1991: Tesfaye Tadesse
- 1991–2010: Seyoum Mesfin
- 2010–2012: Hailemariam Desalegn
- 2012: Berhane Gebre-Christos (acting)
- 2012–2016: Tedros Adhanom Ghebreyesus
- 2016–2019: Workneh Gebeyehu
- 2019–2020: Gedu Andargachew
- 2020–2024: Demeke Mekonnen
- 2024: Taye Atske Selassie
- 2024–present: Gedion Timotheos

== See also ==
- Foreign aid to Ethiopia
- List of diplomatic missions of Ethiopia
- List of diplomatic missions in Ethiopia
