= Kifle Wodajo =

Ethiopian politician and diplomat

Minister of Foreign Affairs Ethiopia
- In office 1974–1977

Personal details
- Born: 30 October 1936
- Died: 28 April 2004

Kifle Wodajo (Amharic: ክፍሌ ወዳጆ, 30 October 1936 – 28 April 2004) was an Ethiopian politician and diplomat who served as Minister of Foreign Affairs of Ethiopia from 1974 to 1977.

He was also the first Secretary-General of the Organization of African States from 25 May 1963 to 21 July 1964.

Kifle Wodajo went into exile in the United States between 1977 and 1991 during the Derg era. After his return, Kifle joined Teshome Hailemariam and Dereje Deresse to form the Ethiopian National Democratic Organization. Kifle became a member of the House of Peoples' Representatives and served as chairman of the commission which drafted the 1995 Constitution.
