= United Nations Security Council Resolution 1181 =

UN Security Council Resolution 1181
- UNOMSIL medal bar
- Date: 13 July 1998
- Meeting no.: 3,902
- Code: S/RES/1181 (Document)
- Subject: The situation in Sierra Leone
- Voting summary: 15 voted for; None voted against; None abstained
- Result: Adopted

Security Council composition
- Permanent members: China; France; Russia; United Kingdom; United States
- Non-permanent members: Bahrain; Brazil; Costa Rica; Gabon; Gambia; Japan; Kenya; Portugal; Slovenia; Sweden

United Nations Security Council resolution 1181, adopted unanimously on 13 July 1998, after recalling all previous resolutions on the situation in Sierra Leone, the council established the United Nations Observer Mission in Sierra Leone (UNOMSIL) to monitor the military and security situation in the country for an initial period of six months until 13 January 1999.

The security council welcomed the efforts of the Sierra Leone government to restore peace and security in the country, including the democratic process and national reconciliation and recognised the role of the Economic Community of West African States (ECOWAS) during this process. It remained concerned at the loss of life and the suffering of refugees and displaced persons, particularly children, as a result of rebel attacks.

The resolution condemned continued resistance to the legitimate government and civilian population by remnants of the former junta and Revolutionary United Front (RUF), calling on both to lay down their arms immediately. A report by the Secretary-General Kofi Annan proposed the establishment of the UNOMSIL peacekeeping operation. Therefore, the council established UNOMSIL for an initial period of six months until 13 January 1999, consisting of up to 70 military observers, a small medical unit and support staff, with a mandate to:

(a) monitor the security situation in the country;
(b) monitor the role of the Economic Community of West African States Monitoring Group (ECOMOG) and the disarmament and demobilisation of former combatants;
(c) assist in monitoring respect for international humanitarian law;
(d) monitor voluntary disarmament of the Civil Defence Forces.

UNOMSIL would be headed by the Special Envoy of the Secretary-General who would be the Special Representative for Sierra Leone. Close co-operation between UNOMSIL and ECOMOG was stressed, and the parties in Sierra Leone were urged to ensure the safety of United Nations personnel and organisations delivering humanitarian assistance. Noting that illegal arms flows were taking place, all states were urged to strictly observe the arms embargo against non-governmental forces in Sierra Leone, in accordance with Resolution 1171 (1998). The Government of Sierra Leone was co-ordinating a more effective response to the needs of children affected by the conflict.

Finally, the Secretary-General was required to submit reports within 30 days and every 60 days thereafter on the implementation of the current resolution and the progress of UNOMSIL in carrying out its mandate.

== See also ==
- History of Sierra Leone
- List of United Nations Security Council Resolutions 1101 to 1200 (1997–1998)
- Sierra Leone Civil War
