= List of heads of government of Ethiopia =

This is a list of heads of government of Ethiopia since the formation of the post of Chief Minister of the Ethiopian Empire in 1909 (renamed to Prime Minister in 1943). Since 1909, there have been 3 chief ministers and 11 prime ministers and one was both chief minister and prime minister, making a total of 15 persons being or having been head of government.

Most of the prime ministers of Ethiopia were regular prime ministers, appointed through a regular political process. Some others were acting prime ministers only (indicated in the list below), while others were both acting and regular prime ministers during their term(s). In addition, there is one prime minister who was acting prime minister first, then was regularly appointed and finally served as a caretaker prime minister of an outgoing government: Hailemariam Desalegn. During the 1960 coup attempt, two prime ministers served at the same time, the regular one and an irregular one appointed by the leaders of the coup. Also, there was an interim prime minister after the end of the Ethiopian Civil War.

Since 1995, the prime minister of Ethiopia has not only been the head of government, but also the commander-in-chief of the Ethiopian National Defense Force. The current prime minister, Abiy Ahmed, took office on 2 April 2018.

== List of officeholders ==
No.	Portrait	Name (Birth–Death)	Term of office			Party (Coalition)	Elected	Cabinet
No.	Portrait	Name (Birth–Death)	Took office	Left office	Time in office	Party (Coalition)	Elected	Cabinet
• Ethiopian Empire (1137–1974) •
1		Fit'awrari; Habte Giyorgis Dinagde (1851–1926)	1909	12 December 1926 #	16–17 years	Independent	—	Dinagde
2		Ras; Tafari Makonnen (1892–1975) (Note: From 2 April 1930, Emperor Haile Selassie.)	1927	1 May 1936 (Exiled)	8–9 years	Independent	—	Makonnen
3		Betwoded; Wolde Tzaddick	1 May 1936	14 May 1942	6 years, 13 days	Independent	—	Tzaddick
4		Ras Betwoded; Makonnen Endelkachew (1890–1963)	14 May 1942	27 November 1957	15 years, 197 days	Independent	—	Endelkachew
5		Ras; Abebe Aregai (1903–1960)	27 November 1957	17 December 1960 X	3 years, 20 days	Independent	1957	Aregai
–		Leul Ras; Imru Haile Selassie (1892–1980); Acting (Note: In rebellion during the 1960 coup attempt.)	14 December 1960	17 December 1960	3 days	Independent	—	Aregai
Vacant (17 December 1960 – 17 April 1961)
6		Tsehafi Taezaz; Aklilu Habte-Wold (1912–1974)	17 April 1961	1 March 1974 (Resigned)	12 years, 318 days	Independent	1961	Habte-Wold
6		Tsehafi Taezaz; Aklilu Habte-Wold (1912–1974)	17 April 1961	1 March 1974 (Resigned)	12 years, 318 days	Independent	1965	Habte-Wold
6		Tsehafi Taezaz; Aklilu Habte-Wold (1912–1974)	17 April 1961	1 March 1974 (Resigned)	12 years, 318 days	Independent	1969	Habte-Wold
6		Tsehafi Taezaz; Aklilu Habte-Wold (1912–1974)	17 April 1961	1 March 1974 (Resigned)	12 years, 318 days	Independent	1973	Habte-Wold
7		Lij; Endelkachew Makonnen (1927–1974)	1 March 1974	22 July 1974 (Imprisoned by the Derg)	143 days	Independent	—	Makonnen
Vacant (22 July – 3 August 1974)
8		Lij; Mikael Imru (1929–2008)	3 August 1974	12 September 1974 (Deposed in a coup by the Derg)	40 days	Independent	—	Imru
• Derg (Provisional Military Government of Socialist Ethiopia) (1974–1987) •
Post Abolished (12 September 1974 – 10 September 1987)
• People's Democratic Republic of Ethiopia (1987–1991) •
9		Fikre Selassie Wogderess (1945–2020)	10 September 1987	8 November 1989 (Dismissed)	2 years, 59 days	WPE	1987	Wogderess
–		Hailu Yimenu (?–1993); Acting	8 November 1989	26 April 1991	1 year, 169 days	WPE	—	Yimenu
–		Tesfaye Dinka (1939–2016); Acting	26 April 1991	28 May 1991	41 days	WPE (until 21 May 1991)	—	Dinka
–		Tesfaye Dinka (1939–2016); Acting	26 April 1991	28 May 1991	41 days	Independent	—	Dinka
• Transitional Government of Ethiopia (1991–1995) •
–		Tesfaye Dinka (1939–2016); Acting	28 May 1991	6 June 1991	9 days	Independent	–	Transitional Government
–		Tamrat Layne (born 1955); Interim	6 June 1991	21 August 1995	4 years, 76 days	ANDM (EPRDF)	—	Transitional Government
• Federal Democratic Republic of Ethiopia (1995–present) •
–		Tamrat Layne (born 1955); Interim	21 August 1995	22 August 1995	1 day	ANDM (EPRDF)	—	
10		Meles Zenawi (1955–2012)	22 August 1995	20 August 2012 #	16 years, 364 days	TPLF (EPRDF)	1995	Zenawi
10		Meles Zenawi (1955–2012)	22 August 1995	20 August 2012 #	16 years, 364 days	TPLF (EPRDF)	2000	Zenawi
10		Meles Zenawi (1955–2012)	22 August 1995	20 August 2012 #	16 years, 364 days	TPLF (EPRDF)	2005	Zenawi
10		Meles Zenawi (1955–2012)	22 August 1995	20 August 2012 #	16 years, 364 days	TPLF (EPRDF)	2010	Zenawi
11		Hailemariam Desalegn (born 1965)	20 August 2012	2 April 2018	5 years, 225 days	SEPDM (EPRDF)	2015	Desalegn
12		Abiy Ahmed (born 1976)	2 April 2018	Incumbent	8 years, 149 days	ODP (EPRDF)	—	Ahmed
12		Abiy Ahmed (born 1976)	2 April 2018	Incumbent	8 years, 149 days	Prosperity	2021	Ahmed
12		Abiy Ahmed (born 1976)	2 April 2018	Incumbent	8 years, 149 days	Prosperity	2026	Ahmed

== See also ==
- Emperor of Ethiopia
  - List of emperors of Ethiopia
- President of Ethiopia
  - List of presidents of Ethiopia
- Prime Minister of Ethiopia
- Rulers of Ethiopia
