= Prime Minister of Ethiopia =

Head of government

Prime Minister of The Federal Democratic Republic of Ethiopia
Name in national languages
- - Amharic: የኢትዮጵያ ጠቅላይ ሚኒስትር; Ye-Ītyoṗṗyā t’ek’lay mīnīstər
  - Oromo: Muummeen Ministiraa Itiyoophiyaa
  - Somali: Raysal Wasaaraha Itoobiya
  - Tigrinya: ቀዳማይ ሚኒስተር ኢትዮጵያ k’edamay minister Ítiyop'iya
  - Afar: Itiyoppiya Naharsi Malak
- Emblem

- Flag of Ethiopia

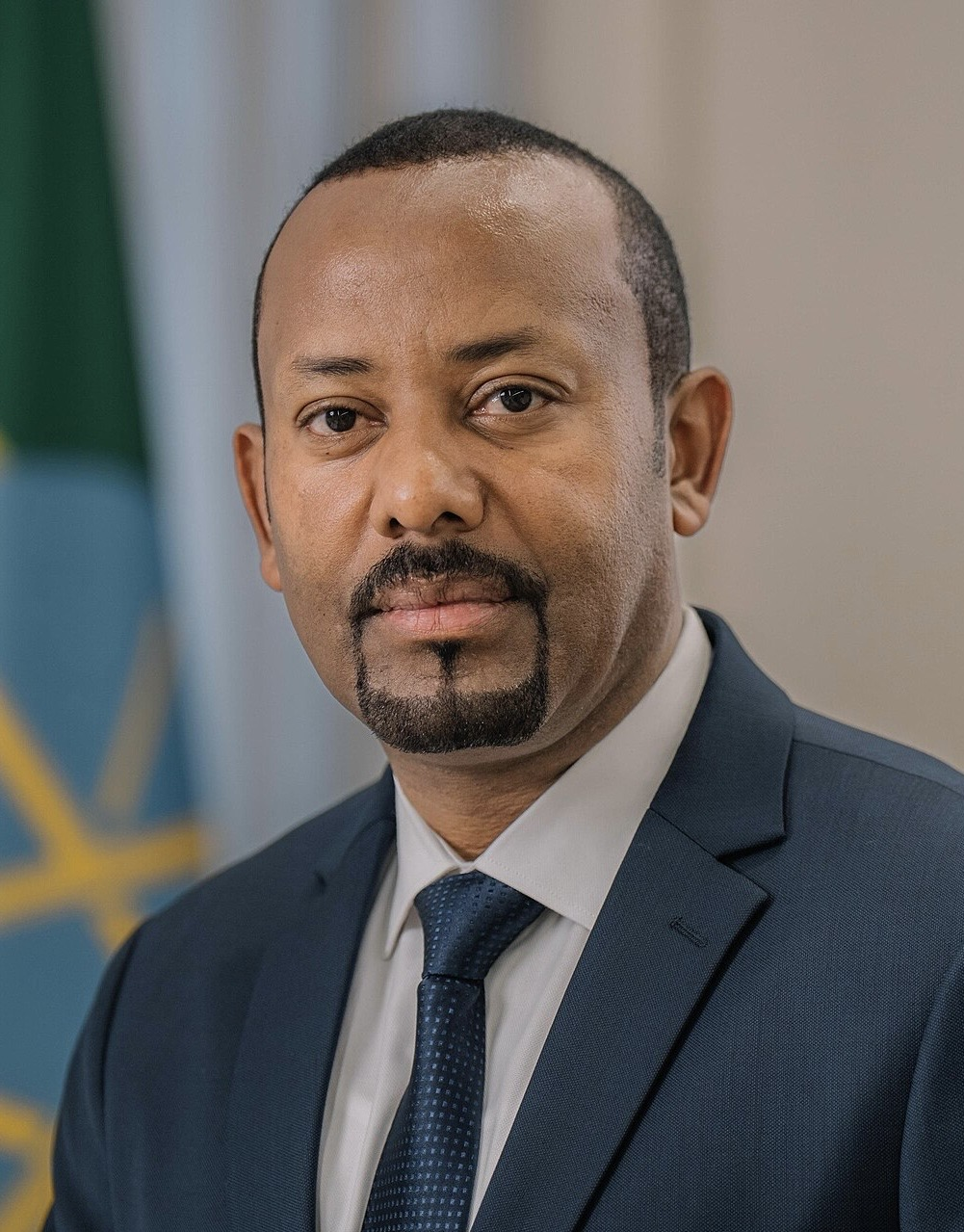
- Incumbent; Abiy Ahmed since 2 April 2018
- Style: Honourable Prime Minister (Within Ethiopia); Prime Minister (Informal); His Excellency (Diplomatic)
- Type: Head of Government
- Status: Chair of Council of Ministers; Chair of National Security Council; Chair of National Economic Council
- Abbreviation: PM
- Member of: Federal Parliamentary Assembly
- Reports to: House of Peoples' Representatives
- Residence: Menelik Palace
- Appointer: House of Peoples' Representatives
- Term length: 5 years term unless Federal Parliamentary Assembly dissolved sooner No term limits specified
- Precursor: Chief Minister
- Inaugural holder: Habte Giyorgis Dinagde (Chief Minister); Makonnen Endelkachew (Prime Minister)
- Formation: 1909 (Chief Minister); 1943 (Prime Minister)
- Deputy: Deputy Prime Minister of Ethiopia
- Salary: Br 3,939,808 / US$73,600 annually
- Website: Prime Minister Office - Ethiopia

The prime minister of Ethiopia is the head of government and chief executive of Ethiopia. Ethiopia is a parliamentary republic with a prime minister as head of the government and the commander-in-chief of the Ethiopian Armed Forces. The prime minister is the most powerful political figure in Ethiopian politics. The official residence of the prime minister is the Menelik Palace in Addis Ababa. The prime minister is elected from the members of the House of Peoples' Representatives and presents a government platform. The prime minister must receive a vote of confidence in the House of Peoples' Representatives to exercise executive power as chief executive. Abiy Ahmed is the third prime minister of the Federal Democratic Republic of Ethiopia, serving since April 2018.

== Origins and history ==
The office of prime minister has been consistently used in modern Ethiopian history. Prior to the establishment of modern government institutions, Ethiopia was an absolute monarchy with the King of Kings presiding as the absolute ruler of Ethiopia. The role of head of government emerged as a cabinet position in the late 18th and early 19th centuries following the introduction of modern government by Emperor Menelik II. The heads of government of Ethiopia have been the chief minister (1909–1943), and then the prime minister (1943–present). The 1995 Constitution transformed Ethiopia into a parliamentary republic and made the prime minister the chief executive of Ethiopia.

=== Solomonic Dynasty (1270–1931) and Modern Absolute Monarchy (1931–1974) ===
==== The chief minister of Ethiopia ====
The first head of government at the cabinet level was Habte Giyorgis Dinagde as the emperor's loyal chief minister under Emperor Menelik II. The chief minister was the chair of the cabinet and the Ministry of Defense, who served at the pleasure of the King of Kings, the absolute ruler. In modern Ethiopian history there have been three chief ministers, including Tafari Makonnen under Empress Zewditu and Betwoded Wolde Tzaddick under Emperor Haile Selassie.

==== The 1931 Constitution of Ethiopia ====
The office of the prime minister was officially established following the 1931 Constitution of Ethiopia. The 1931 constitution was the first modern constitution in Ethiopia that attempted to create a modern system of government. The 1931 Constitution of Ethiopia named the emperor of Ethiopia as the absolute ruler of Ethiopia and the prime minister as the leader of the council of ministers that coordinated day-to-day government activities with the consent of the emperor of Ethiopia. Until the 1955 revised Constitution of Ethiopia there were three prime ministers, including the first prime minister Makonnen Endelkachew and the last prime minister Abebe Aregai, who was assassinated during the failed 1960 Ethiopian coup d'état attempt. Following the assassination of Abebe Aregai, Imru Haile Selassie served as acting prime minister for only three days.

==== The 1955 Constitution of Ethiopia ====
The revised 1955 constitution of Ethiopia was put into effect in 1961 following the failed 1960 Ethiopian coup d'état attempt. The 1955 revised Constitution of Ethiopia attempted to take Ethiopia towards a constitutional monarchy system. Under the 1955 constitution the office of the prime minister and Chamber of Deputies was given autonomy and power. Although the prime minister and parliament's power was stronger on paper, in practice the emperor of Ethiopia possessed significant power and ruled the country as de jure absolute ruler. Nonetheless since Ethiopia was coming out from absolute monarchy where only the monarch had power, over time the prime minister became in fact the head of government while the Emperor was the head of state. The first prime minister under the 1955 Constitution of Ethiopia was Aklilu Habte-Wold, and the last prime minister was Mikael Imru, who was dismissed following the 1974 revolution which established the Provisional Military Government (PMG).

=== The Provisional Military Government (PMG) (1974–1987) ===
In September 1974 the last emperor of Ethiopia, Haile Selassie, was overthrown by a military coup. The military administration abolished the monarchies of Ethiopia and established the Provisional Military Government of Socialist Ethiopia. The chairman of the Provisional Military Government of Socialist Ethiopia was head of the government. From 1974 until 1987 the office of prime minister was not in use until the declaration of 1987 Constitution of Ethiopia which created the People's Democratic Republic of Ethiopia.

=== The People's Democratic Republic of Ethiopia (PDRE) (1987–1991) ===
The prime minister office came into effect following the declaration of the People's Democratic Republic of Ethiopia (PDRE). The 1987 Constitution of Ethiopia named the prime minister as the head of government and the principal advisor to the president of the people's republic. The prime minister also held the highest rank in the civil service of the central government. The prime minister was formally approved by the National Shengo upon the nomination of the president. In practice, the prime minister was chosen within the Workers' Party of Ethiopia (WPE) through deliberations by incumbent WEP Politburo members and retired WEP Politburo Standing Committee members. The first prime minister of the People's Democratic Republic of Ethiopia was Fikre Selassie Wogderess, who served from 1987 to 1989. The last prime minister was Tesfaye Dinka, who fled to the United States in exile following the dissolution of the London peace conference which ended the PDRE and established the Transitional Government of Ethiopia (TGE).

=== Transitional Government of Ethiopia (TEG) (1991–1995) ===
The end of the Ethiopian Civil War in May 1991 resulted in the end to the People's Democratic Republic of Ethiopia constitution. A new provisional constitution and Transitional Government of Ethiopia was formed. The Transitional Government of Ethiopia was de facto a semi-presidential system, with the president as head of state and prime minister as head of government. The prime minister was appointed by the president, along with other ministers in the Cabinet. The prime minister coordinated and chaired cabinet meetings with the consultation of the president of the Transitional Government of Ethiopia. The only prime minister who served during the Transitional Government of Ethiopia was Tamrat Layne.

=== Federal Democratic Republic of Ethiopia (FDRE) (1995–present) ===
A draft of a new constitution was declared in 1995 as the constitution of the Federal Democratic Republic of Ethiopia. The 1995 Constitution of Ethiopia transformed Ethiopia into a parliamentary republic with the president of Ethiopia as head of state and the prime minister as head of government. The Constitution of the Federal Democratic Republic of Ethiopia explicitly vests executive power in the Council of Ministers chaired by the prime minister as chief executive and de jure commander-in-chief of the Ethiopian Armed Forces. The prime minister is nominated among members of the House of Peoples' Representatives and must be approved by two-third majority vote of confidence. In practice, the prime minister is the leader of the largest party with the highest number of sites in the House of Peoples' Representatives. The prime minister nominates the member of Council of Ministers for approval by House of Peoples' Representatives by two-third majority. The first prime minister of FDRE was Meles Zenawi, who served from 1995 to 2012. The current prime minister is Abiy Ahmed serving since April 2018.

== Nomination and appointment of the prime minister ==
After a general election, the National Election Board of Ethiopia announces the official results. Based on the results the president of Ethiopia nominates the leader of the party with the majority in the House of Peoples' Representatives as Prime Minister Designate of Ethiopia to form the Federal Government of Ethiopia.

The leader of the party must be a member of the House of Peoples' Representatives to be nominated as The Prime Minister Designate of Ethiopia. If no party wins an overall majority, the president of Ethiopia invites the leader of the relative majority (plurality) political party to form a coalition government with other parties.

The prime minister designate must be approved by a two-thirds majority vote of confidence in the House of Peoples' Representatives to be appointed as Prime Minister of Ethiopia. After being appointed, the prime minister presents himself before the House of Peoples' Representatives and makes a declaration of loyalty to the Constitution and the people of Ethiopia.

== List of Prime Ministers ==
- Fitawrari Habte Giyorgis -1909 to 1927
- Ras Tafari Makonnen - 1927 to 1 May 1936
- Wolde Tzaddick - 1 May 1936 to 1942
- Ras Betwoded Makonnen Endelkachew - 1942 to 1 November 1957
- Ras Abebe Aregai - 27 November 1957 to 17 December 1960
- Leul Ras Imru Haile Selassie - 12 December 1960 to 15 December 1960
- Tsehafi Taezaz Aklilu Habte-Wold - 17 April 1961 to 1 March 1974
- Lij Endelkachew Makonnen - 1 March 1974 to 22 July 1974
- Lij Mikael Imru - 3 August 1974 to 12 September 1974
- Fikre Selassie Wogderess - 10 September 1987 to 8 November 1989
- Hailu Yimenu - 8 November 1989 to 26 April 1991
- Tesfaye Dinka - 26 April 1991 to 6 June 1991
- Tamrat Layne - 6 June 1991 to 22 August 1995
- Meles Zenawi - 23 August 1995 to 20 August 2012
- Hailemariam Desalegn - 20 August 2012 to 02 April 2018
- Abiy Ahmed Ali - 2 April 2018 till date

== Security ==
The prime minister of Ethiopia is the most protected government official in the country. The prime minister's security detail is under the command of the Republican Guard, which is a special armed unit of the Ethiopian National Defense Force. The Republican Guard's Counter Military Unit is responsible for protecting the prime minister's official residence Menelik Palace commonly known as 4 Killo National Palace. The Counter Military Unit is an elite paramilitary force armed with heavy assault rifles such as Israel-made Tavor-21 and American M4 carbines as well as having snipers, helicopters and armored vehicles.

== See also ==
- Council of Ministers (Ethiopia)
- Emperor of Ethiopia
  - List of emperors of Ethiopia
- President of Ethiopia
  - List of presidents of Ethiopia
  - List of heads of government of Ethiopia
