= 1994 Ethiopian Constituent Assembly election =

- 5 June 1994
- All 544 seats in the Council of Representatives; 273 seats needed for a majority
| Party | Leader | Vote % | Seats | +/– |
|---|---|---|---|---|
| OPDO | | | 179 | +179 |
| ANDM | | | 134 | +134 |
| TPLF | | | 37 | +37 |
| EPRDF | | | 13 | +13 |
This lists parties that won seats. See the complete results below.

Elections for a Constituent Assembly were held in Ethiopia on 5 June 1994 in order to form a body to draw up a new constitution. They were the first elections after the overthrow of the Mengistu regime at the end of the Ethiopian Civil War in 1991, and the first ever multi-party elections in the country; previous elections had either been non-partisan or one-party. The results saw the Ethiopian People's Revolutionary Democratic Front and its allies win 463 of the 544 seats. Voter turnout was 87.5%.

The Assembly finished drafting the new constitution in December, and it went into effect in August 1995.

== Background ==
Mengistu Haile Mariam was the leader of Ethiopia from 1977 to 1991, during the military dictatorship of the Derg. The Ethiopian Civil War ended in 1991 with the overthrow of the Derg, which had governed as the People's Democratic Republic of Ethiopia from 1987 to 1991.

The Ethiopian People's Revolutionary Democratic Front (EPRDF), a rebel group during the Derg, was transformed into the Transitional Government of Ethiopia in May 1991. With help, and money, given by the United States State Department with expectations of "democratic" behavior, the EPRDF was able to choose members of the TGE and how it would be run. Meles Zenawi became interim president, with Tamrat Layne as interim prime minister.

After gaining power, the anti-Mengistu alliance started removing weaker members of the party from power, creating a new authoritarian system. Under this authoritarian system, rules were based on ethnicity and anyone with opposing ideas were silenced with basic human rights denied by the seemingly unreachable leaders of the TGE.

The EPRDF held a National Conference from 1–5 July 1991 during which they adopted a National Charter. This was an interim constitution which established the Transitional Government. The Charter created the posts of president and prime minister, an 87-member Council of Representatives and a 17-member multi-ethnic Council of Ministers. The Council of Representatives was to elect the president and oversee transition to a permanent government. The Constituent Assembly was expectation to draw up a new constitution for Ethiopia.

The National Election Board created by the government in 1991 to organize and monitor elections, stated that out of about 23 million total eligible voters, over 15 million registered to vote.

== Campaign ==
Although there enthusiasm about the end of the dictatorship, there was also some scepticism about some of the new parties; the democratic credentials of the EPRDF were questioned due to relations with parties that were associated with the past regime such as the Ethiopian People's Revolutionary Party (EPRP), the All-Ethiopia Socialist Movement (Meisone), and the Coalition of Ethiopian Democratic Forces (COEDF).

Some groups were prohibited from becoming political parties if they were created to advance their political objectives by force of arms, and/or to foment conflict and war by preaching hatred and animosity among nations, nationalities and peoples on the basis of differences of race or religion. These included the Workers' Party of Ethiopia (WPE) and the Ethiopian National Democratic Party (ENDP).

For months before and after the election there were many reports of voters voting out of fear of change. Some voters feared a change in government would cause a famine. Despite the people's fears not being realised, it still affected the way they voted.

== Results ==
Groups affiliated with the EPRDF that won seats include the Oromo People's Democratic Organization (OPDO), the Amhara National Democratic Movement (ANDM), the Tigray People's Liberation Front (TPLF) and the Ethiopian People's Revolutionary Democratic Front (EPRDF).

| Party or alliance | | Votes | % | Seats |
|---|---|---|---|---|
| EPRDF and allies | Oromo People's Democratic Organization | | | 179 |
| EPRDF and allies | Amhara National Democratic Movement | | | 134 |
| EPRDF and allies | Tigray People's Liberation Front | | | 37 |
| EPRDF and allies | Sidama People's Democratic Organization | | | 19 |
| EPRDF and allies | Wolayta People's Democratic Organization | | | 13 |
| EPRDF and allies | Gamo and Gofa People's Democratic Organization | | | 13 |
| EPRDF and allies | Ethiopian People's Revolutionary Democratic Front | | | 13 |
| EPRDF and allies | Gurage People's Revolutionary Democratic Movement | | | 12 |
| EPRDF and allies | Hadiya People's Democratic Organization | | | 8 |
| EPRDF and allies | Keficho People's Democratic Organization | | | 6 |
| EPRDF and allies | Gideo People's Revolutionary Democratic Organization | | | 6 |
| EPRDF and allies | Kembata People's Democratic Organization | | | 5 |
| EPRDF and allies | Dawro People's Democratic Organization | | | 4 |
| EPRDF and allies | Afar People's Democratic Organization | | | 2 |
| EPRDF and allies | Alaba People's Democratic Organization | | | 2 |
| EPRDF and allies | Bench People's Revolutionary Democratic Organization | | | 2 |
| EPRDF and allies | Shekecho People's Democratic Movement | | | 2 |
| EPRDF and allies | Gambela People's Liberation Movement | | | 2 |
| EPRDF and allies | Tembaro People's Democratic Organization | | | 1 |
| EPRDF and allies | Yem People's Democratic Front | | | 1 |
| EPRDF and allies | Konso People's Revolutionary Democratic Organization | | | 1 |
| EPRDF and allies | Kore People's Revolutionary Democratic Organization | | | 1 |
| EPRDF and allies | Total | | | 463 |
| Ethiopian Somali Democratic League | | | | 13 |
| Southern Omo People's Revolutionary Democratic Organization | | | | 7 |
| Afar Liberation Front | | | | 6 |
| Benishangul People's Liberation Movement | | | | 5 |
| Silte, Azernet Berbere, Alico Worero, Meskan Melga, Woloene Gedebano People's Democratic Movement | | | | 3 |
| Gumusz People's Liberation Movement | | | | 2 |
| Mein People's Revolutionary Democratic Organization | | | | 2 |
| Western Somali Democratic League | | | | 2 |
| Argoba Nation Unity Organization | | | | 1 |
| Kebena Nationality Democratic Organization | | | | 1 |
| Mareko People's Democratic Organization | | | | 1 |
| Burji People's Democratic Organization | | | | 1 |
| Dizi People's Revolutionary Democratic Organization | | | | 1 |
| Hareri National League | | | | 1 |
| Gamo Democratic Unity | | | | 1 |
| Independents | | | | 34 |
| Total | | | | 544 |
| Valid votes | | 14,368,924 | 97.76 | |
| Invalid/blank votes | | 329,179 | 2.24 | |
| Total votes | | 14,698,103 | 100.00 | |
| Registered voters/turnout | | 16,797,143 | 87.50 | |
Source: Nohlen et al.

== Aftermath ==
After the elections Negasso Gidada became president, whilst Meles Zenawi became prime minister. Layne was Deputy Prime Minister until his dismissal in 1996. The newly elected Constituent Assembly created the new Constitution of Ethiopia which took effect on 21 August 1995. Despite the overthrow of the Derg, the country remained a virtual one-party state.
