= National Shengo =

Former legislature of Ethiopia (1987–1991)

National Shengo ብሔራዊ ሸንጎ
- Emblem of the People's Democratic Republic of Ethiopia

Type
- Type: Unicameral

History
- Established: 22 February 1987
- Disbanded: 28 May 1991
- Preceded by: Imperial Parliament
- Succeeded by: Council of Representatives

Structure
- Seats: 835
- Political groups: Workers' Party of Ethiopia: 795 seats Independents: 40 seats
- Length of term: 5 years

Elections
- Voting system: First-past-the-post
- Last election: 14 June 1987

Meeting place
- Shengo Hall, Addis Ababa, Ethiopia

Constitution
- 1987 Constitution of Ethiopia

The National Shengo (Amharic: ብሔራዊ ሸንጎ, romanized: Bihērawī Shengo, lit. 'National Congress' or 'National Assembly') was the highest organ of state power of the People's Democratic Republic of Ethiopia (PDRE) from 1987 to 1991.

== Overview ==
The Shengo was established on 22 February 1987, three weeks after a national referendum approved a new constitution making Ethiopia a one-party socialist state under the leadership of the Communist Workers' Party of Ethiopia (WPE). The Shengo's 835 members were elected to five-year terms in the 30 June 1987 general elections, in which the WPE won 795 seats and pro-WPE independents won the remaining 40 seats. The Shengo became the highest organ of state power in the newly formed PDRE when it convened for the first time on 9 September 1987.

Executive power was vested in the president, elected by the Shengo for a five-year term, and a cabinet also appointed by the Shengo. The president was the ex officio chairman of the Council of State, the country's supreme executive body. The Council of State was formally defined as a permanent standing body of the National Shengo. It acted for the legislature between sessions (in practice, for most of the year), during which it was empowered to issue "special decrees" in lieu of law. If such decrees did not get the consent of the Shengo at its next session, they were considered revoked. Actual power, however, rested in the WPE—and particularly with Mengistu Haile Mariam, who served as both president of the republic and general secretary of the WPE.

On paper, the National Shengo was vested with great lawmaking and oversight powers. It had the right to act on "any national issue," and all national officials were nominally subordinate to it. Members of the Shengo had the right to ask questions of mass organizations and state organs to which they were required to respond. In practice, as with other Communist legislatures, the principles of democratic centralism reduced the Shengo to merely a rubber stamp for decisions already made by Mengistu and the WPE Politburo.

For example, while Mengistu was required to submit his nominations for cabinet ministers, Supreme Court justices and members of the executive staff for approval by the Shengo, this approval was almost always a formality. Additionally, the Shengo's nominal power of veto over the Council of State's "special decrees" was rarely exercised, meaning these decrees de facto had the force of law.

== Abolition ==
In May 1991, with the Ethiopian People's Revolutionary Democratic Front (EPRDF) closing in on Addis Ababa, Mengistu fled into exile. His government only survived him for a week before the EPRDF took the capital. The EPRDF immediately disbanded the Workers' Party and the Shengo. In July the Transitional Government of Ethiopia was formed.
