= 1995 Constitution of Ethiopia =

Supreme law of the Federal Democratic Republic of Ethiopia

The Constitution of the Federal Democratic Republic of Ethiopia
- Front cover of the Constitution book

Overview
- Jurisdiction: Ethiopia
- Created: 8 December 1994; 31 years ago
- Ratified: June 1994
- Date effective: 21 August 1995; 31 years ago
- System: Federal parliamentary republic

Government structure
- Branches: Executive, legislative and judicial
- Chambers: House of Federation (upper chamber); House of Peoples' Representatives (lower chamber)
- Executive: Council of Ministers
- Judiciary: 2 (federal and state)

Full text
- Constitution of Ethiopia at Wikisource

The Constitution of the Federal Democratic Republic of Ethiopia (Amharic: የኢትዮጵያ ፌዴራላዊ ዴሞክራሲያዊ ሪፐብሊክ ሕገ መንግሥት, romanized: Ye-Ītyōṗṗyā Fēdēralawī Dēmokirasīyawī Rīpebilīk Ḥige Menigišit), also known as the 1995 Constitution of Ethiopia, is the supreme law of Ethiopia. The constitution came into force on 21 August 1995 after it was drafted by the Constituent Assembly elected in June 1994. It was adopted by the Transitional Government of Ethiopia on 8 December 1994 and was implemented following the general election held in May–June 1995.

== Structure ==
The constitution consists of 106 articles divided into 11 chapters. Articles I-VII contain general provisions concerning the designation of the state, territorial jurisdiction, and the Ethiopian flag; Articles VIII-XII describe sovereignty, the supremacy of the constitution, democratic rights, separation of state and religion, and accountability of the government. It provides for a federal government of nine ethnically based regions governed by a parliament divided into the House of Peoples' Representatives and the House of Federation. It provides for a parliamentary system, with a mostly ceremonial president as head of state, and executive power vested in a Council of Ministers headed by a prime minister.

The constitution expressly provides for a set of basic human rights; Article 13 specifies that these rights and freedoms will be interpreted in accordance with the Universal Declaration of Human Rights, the International Covenant on Civil and Political Rights, and other international instruments adopted by Ethiopia.

The document further guarantees that all Ethiopian languages will enjoy equal state recognition, although Amharic is specified as the working language of the federal government.

Ethiopia has a tradition of highly personal and strongly centralised government, a pattern the Ethiopian People's Revolutionary Democratic Front (the former ruling government coalition) had followed despite constitutional limits on federal power.

The first general election held after the adoption of the constitution was the 2000 election.

There were three earlier written constitutions of Ethiopia, the preceding one being the 1987 Constitution.

== Controversy ==
The 1995 constitution has been subjected to constitutional crises with the involvement of a few political organisations using it to pursue their own agendas. Some critics claim that the constitution was drafted by the TPLF/EPRDF coalition behind closed doors and enacted overnight.

The Constitutional Commission of the Transitional Government of Ethiopia (TGE) had worked with the Regional Affairs Coordination Department for two years (1993 and 1994). The Constitutional Commission organised public discussions from the grassroots to a national level. They involved many experts for advice while drafting. The Commission also organised symposiums and forums at which the main draft provisions were discussed and debated by Ethiopians. One notable feature of the discussion was that it was conducted article by article. After discussion, participants voted on each provision of the constitution, and results were compiled at kebele, district, zone, region or national level.

=== Main provisions of the Constitution ===
==== Article 39 ====
Article 39 of the constitution deals with the rights of the nations, nationalities, and peoples of Ethiopia, including the provision that "Every Nation, Nationality and People in Ethiopia has an unconditional right to self-determination, including the right to secession".

==== The flag ====
Article 3(1) says "The Ethiopian flag shall consist of green at the top, yellow in the middle and red at the bottom, and shall have a national emblem at the centre". Accordingly, the Flag and Emblem Proclamation No. 16/1996, Proclamation No. 48/1996 (Amendment) and Flag Proclamation No. 654/2009 were enacted.

Opponents of Article 3 expressed their opposition by developing a different flag and subsequent laws in an act of rejection. The Ethiopian government also failed to enforce its own constitutional laws in this regard.

Article 3(3) authorised the members of the Federation to use their respective flags and emblems, which was opposed by pro-unitary groups. A few individuals opened debates through the media about the flag and emblems of Ethiopia and gave guidance to the government.

==== Article 47 ====
Article 47 of the constitution lists the member states of the Federal Democratic Republic of Ethiopia and enshrines the right of Nations, Nationalities and Peoples to establish their own States.

Opponents objected to Article 47 due to Article 39, which stated that States should be divided along geographical lines (rivers, lakes, etc.) or economic class (pastoralists, farmers, etc.) rather than ethnolinguistic divisions. There is some level of confusion within the government on this argument; for example, Prime Minister Abiy Ahmed conflated the terms "boundary" and "border".

==== Other articles ====
Article 40(3): "land is a common property of the Nations, Nationalities and Peoples of Ethiopia and shall not be subject to sale or to other means of exchange".

Article 45: "The Federal Democratic Republic of Ethiopia shall have a parliamentarian form of government”.

Article 5: "all Ethiopian languages shall enjoy equal state recognition. 2. Amharic shall be the working language of the Federal Government”.

Article 49: "the special interest of the State of Oromia in Addis Ababa."

== Public opinion ==
In October 2022, the Policy Studies Institute released a report detailing public support for the FDRE constitution in Ethiopia. The results found that 91% of Oromia, 66% of the Somali Region and 64% of Benishangul-Gumuz supported the ethno-territorial system. While 78% of Amhara, 71% of Sidama and 70% of the Southwest were opposed to the ethno-territorial system. Those who were opposed to it saw the constitution as being the source of ethnic conflicts within the country, while those supporting it emphasised that it protected the sovereignty of the nations and nationalities in Ethiopia.

However, there is overwhelming support for an amendment to Article 39 containing the right to secession. More than 75% of the respondents support an amendment to this provision. The tendency to support all of these provisions is highest among participants from the Somali (52%) and Oromia (35%) regions, while the tendency to oppose is higher among respondents from the Amhara Region (88%) and SNNPR (86%). However, it is only from the Somali region that the majority of participants supported the right to secession being kept intact.

== See also ==
- Constitutions of Ethiopia
