= 1987 Ethiopian general election =

- 14 June 1987

All 835 seats in the National Shengo 418 seats needed for a majority
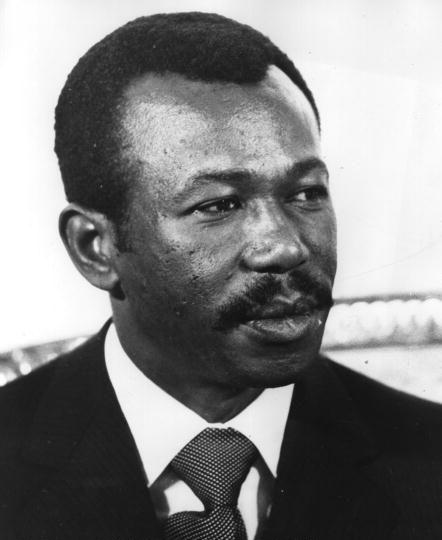

	Majority party	Minority party
Leader	Mengistu Haile Mariam	–
Party	Workers' Party	Independents
Seats won	795	40
Popular vote	12,981,957	104,693
Percentage	99.20%	0.80%

General elections were held in Ethiopia on 14 June 1987 for seats in its Shengo. This was the first election since Emperor Haile Selassie was deposed in the Ethiopian Revolution as well as the first–and as it turned out, only–election under the 1987 constitution, which replaced the Derg regime with the People's Democratic Republic of Ethiopia (PDRE).

== Background ==
The new Ethiopian Constitution, adopted by a referendum held on 1 February 1987, provided for a national parliament, the Shengo, as the nominal supreme organ of state power. The date of the general elections was officially announced only two days in advance. In the running for the Shengo's 835 seats were some 2,500 candidates, mostly nominated by the communist Workers' Party of Ethiopia, the country's only legally permitted party. The WPE won 795 seats, with pro-WPE independents taking the remaining 40 seats. Voter turnout was reported to be 90.5%.

In May 1991, four years into the Shengo's five-year term, the PDRE was overthrown by the Ethiopian People's Revolutionary Democratic Front. Following a three-year transition period, elections for a Constituent Assembly were held in 1994.

== Results ==
Party	Votes	%	Seats
Workers' Party of Ethiopia	12,981,957	99.20	795
Independents	104,693	0.80	40
Total	13,086,650	100.00	835
Valid votes	13,086,650	81.36	
Invalid/blank votes	2,998,350	18.64	
Total votes	16,085,000	100.00	
Registered voters/turnout	17,768,000	90.53	
Source: Nohlen et al.
