= Communist Ethiopia =

Communist Ethiopia may refer to:

- Derg, the short form of the Coordinating Committee of the Armed Forces, Police, and Territorial Army - the official name of the country was the Provisional Military Government of Socialist Ethiopia (1974-1987)
- People's Democratic Republic of Ethiopia (1987-1991)
