= Tamrat =

Tamrat, also Tamirat is a male given name of Ethiopian origin that may refer to:

- Tamirat Layne (born 1955), Ethiopian politician and former leader of the Ethiopian People's Democratic Movement
- Tamrat Molla (1945–2012), Ethiopian singer and vocalist
- Taddesse Tamrat (1935–2013), Ethiopian history professor of Medieval Ethiopia
