= Constitutions of Ethiopia =

Ethiopia has had four constitutions:

- 1931 Constitution of Ethiopia
- 1955 Constitution of Ethiopia
- 1987 Constitution of Ethiopia
- 1995 Constitution of Ethiopia

A proposed revision of the 1955 constitution was released in 1974, but it had no legal effect, and was soon forgotten in the events of the Ethiopian Revolution.

Until the adoption of the first of these constitutions, the concepts of Ethiopian government had been codified in the Kebra Nagast (which presented the concept that the legitimacy of the Emperor of Ethiopia was based on its asserted descent from king Solomon of ancient Israel), and the Fetha Nagast (a legal code used in Ethiopia at least as early as 1450 to define the rights and responsibilities of the monarch and subjects, as defined by the Ethiopian Orthodox Tewahedo Church).
