= Menelik Palace =

Residence of Prime Minister of Ethiopia

Menelik II Palace
- የምኒልክ ግቢ
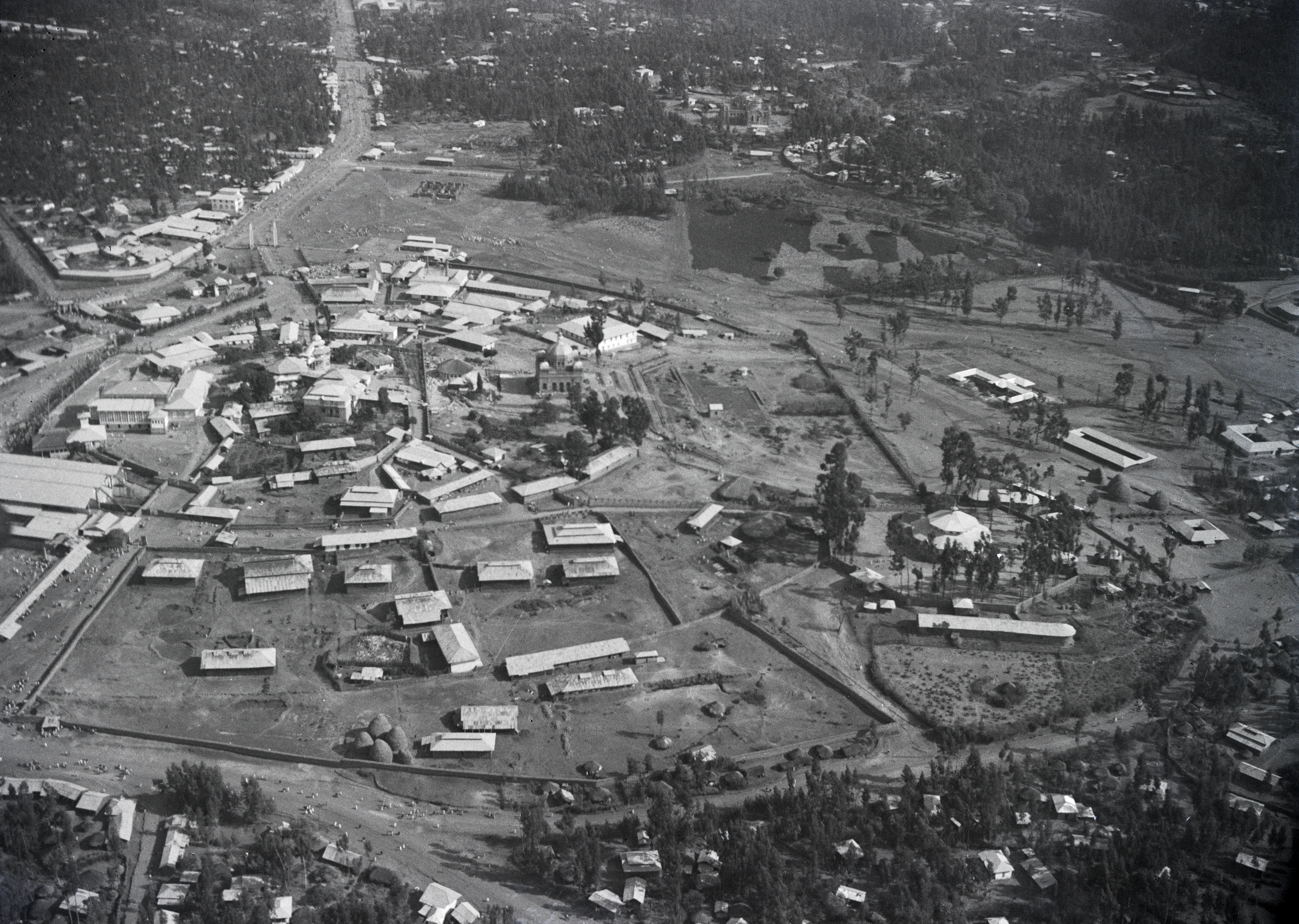
- The Imperial Palace around 1934
- Interactive map of the Menelik II Palace area
- Former names: Menelik II Palace
- Alternative names: Imperial Palace or Great Ghebbi

General information
- Location: Addis Ababa, Ethiopia
- Coordinates: 9°01′29″N 38°45′48″E
- Construction started: 1890

Technical details
- Size: 36 hectares

Website
- www.unitypark.et

The Menelik Palace, also known as the Imperial Palace or Great Ghebbi, is a palatial compound in Addis Ababa, Ethiopia. Previously for years was known as the Gebbi, it was the seat of the power of the Emperors of Ethiopia. Within its confines (now called Unity Park) are several residences, halls, chapels, and working buildings. Today it contains the offices and residence of the Prime Minister of Ethiopia.

== History ==
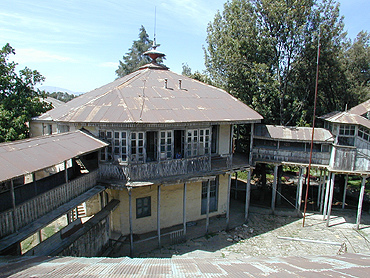
Menelik Palace

The palace grounds contain several churches. The most important is the Ta'eka Negest (Resting Place of Kings) Ba'eta Le Mariam Monastery. It has a large Imperial crown at the top of the dome. The church serves as a mausoleum for Emperor Menelik II, his wife Empress Taitu, and Empress Zewditu, his daughter and eventual successor. Other churches within the grounds are the Se'el Bet Kidane Meheret Church (Our Lady Covenant of Mercy) and the Debre Mengist St. Gabriel Church.

During the rule of Mengistu Haile Mariam (1977–1991), the palace grounds were used as a prison to house many notables of the government of Emperor Haile Selassie, the Emperor included. Built during this time was the Shengo Hall, accommodating the country's legislature, and the Presidential Office Building.

In 2010, construction began on a new residence for Prime Minister Meles Zenawi and his family. The project, which was estimated to cost 80 million birr for a two-storey house, was being supervised by Meles's wife, Azeb Mesfin. Also part of the project were guest houses worth 25 million birr, and a thorough refurbishment of the palace gardens.

In 2018 work began on a large-scale restoration of the palace compound, and in 2019 it was opened to the public as Unity Park.

== Buildings ==
=== Gibr Adarash ===
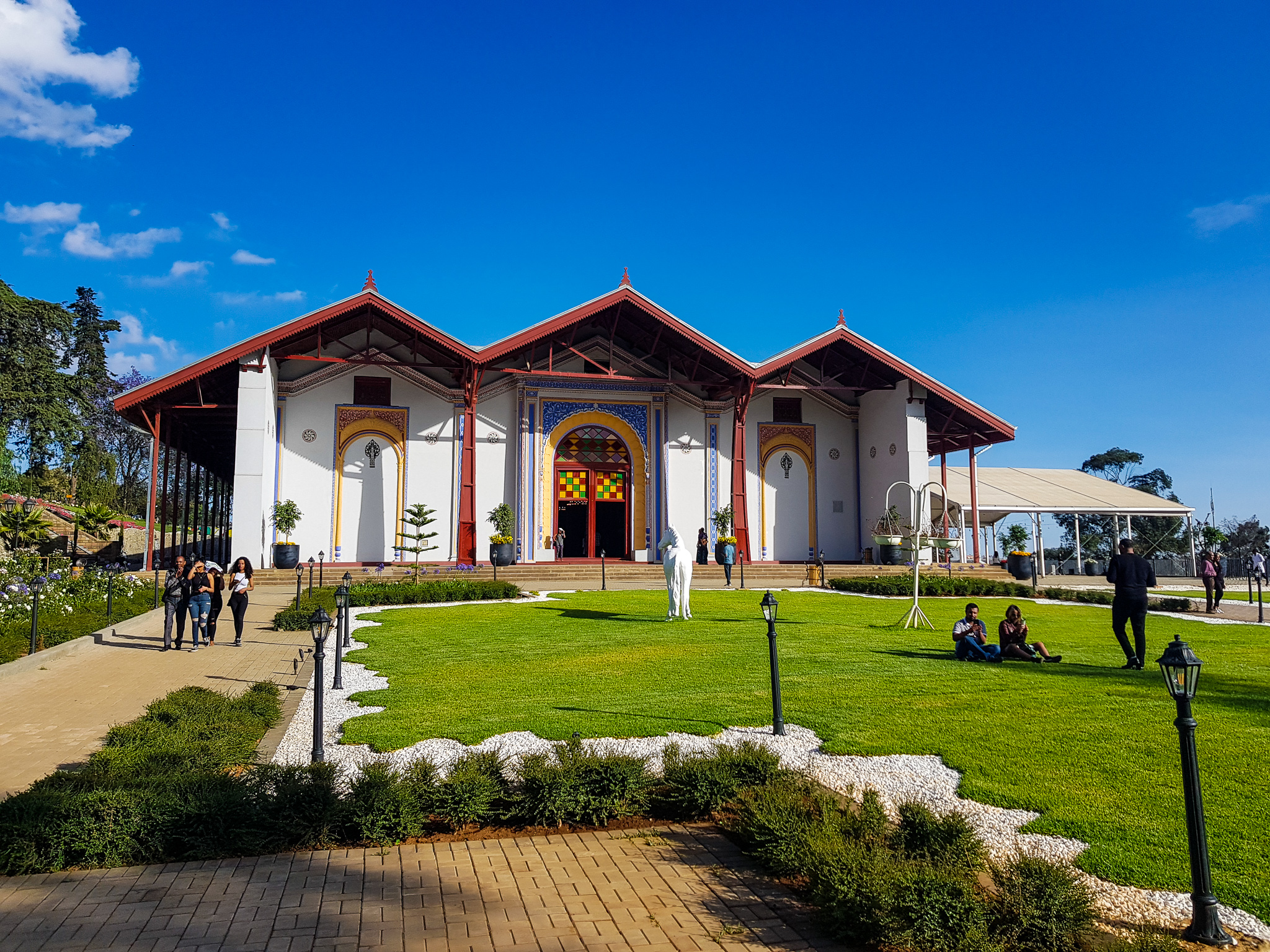
Gibr Adarash (banquet hall)

The massive Gibr Adarash was used by Emperor Menelik II to give his periodic great "Gibr" feasts in which he fed large numbers of his subjects. It was later used as a venue for large gatherings or special occasions Emperor Haile Selassie used it as the venue for large state banquets, such as the one held for the African Heads of State gathered to form the Organization of African Unity (now the African Union) in 1963. It was used for the state dinners in honor of the visits of British Queen Elizabeth II in 1965 and French President Charles de Gaulle.

=== Zufan Adarash ===
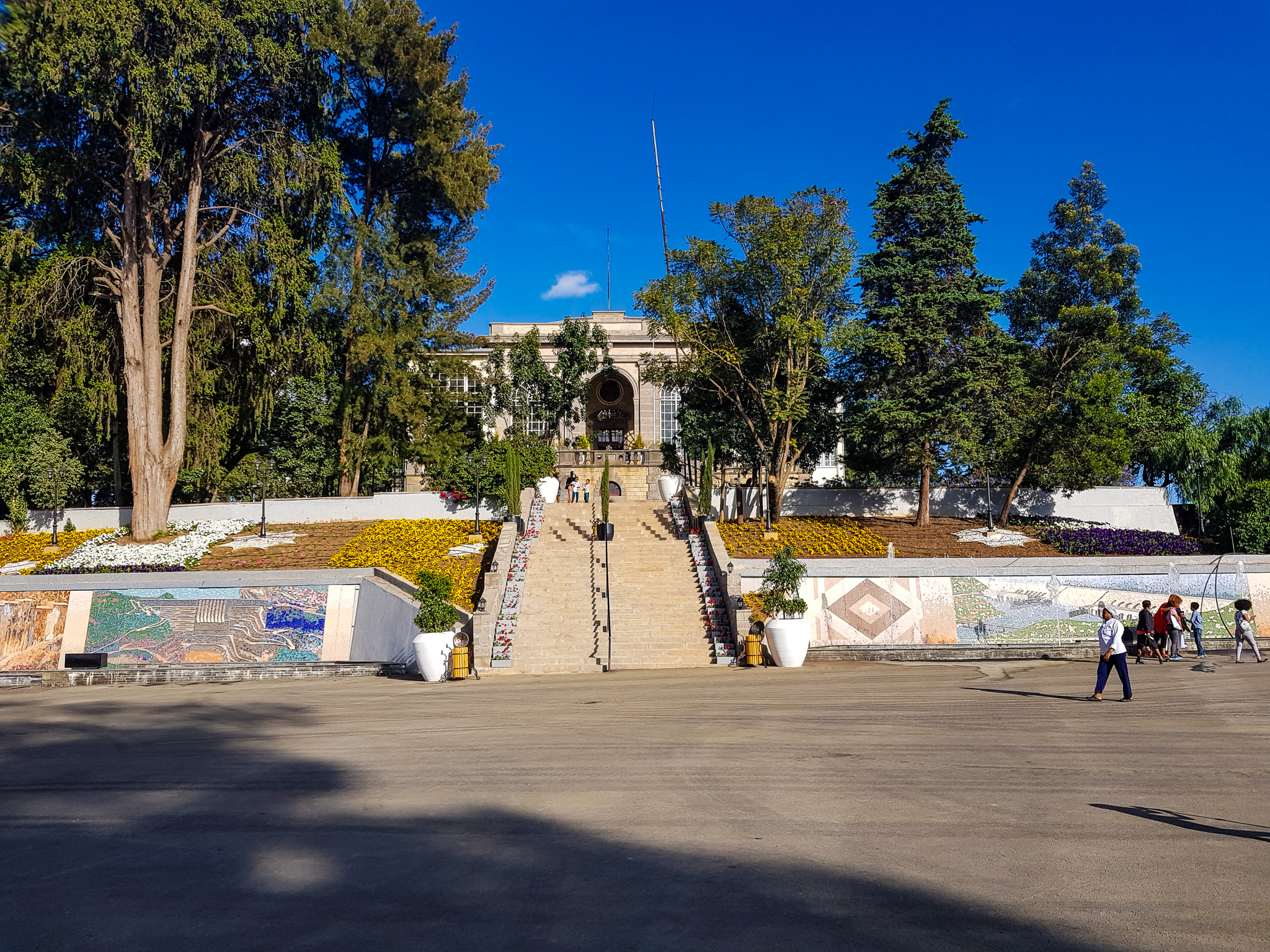
Zufan Adarash (throne hall)

The Zufan Adarash was used as the main throne hall for imperial audiences. During the Red Terror its cellars were used as an ad-hoc prison for high-ranking officials of the ancien régime.

=== Te'eka Negist Mausoleum ===
Burial place of Emperors Menelik II and Lij Iyasu and Empresses Zewditu and Taytu.

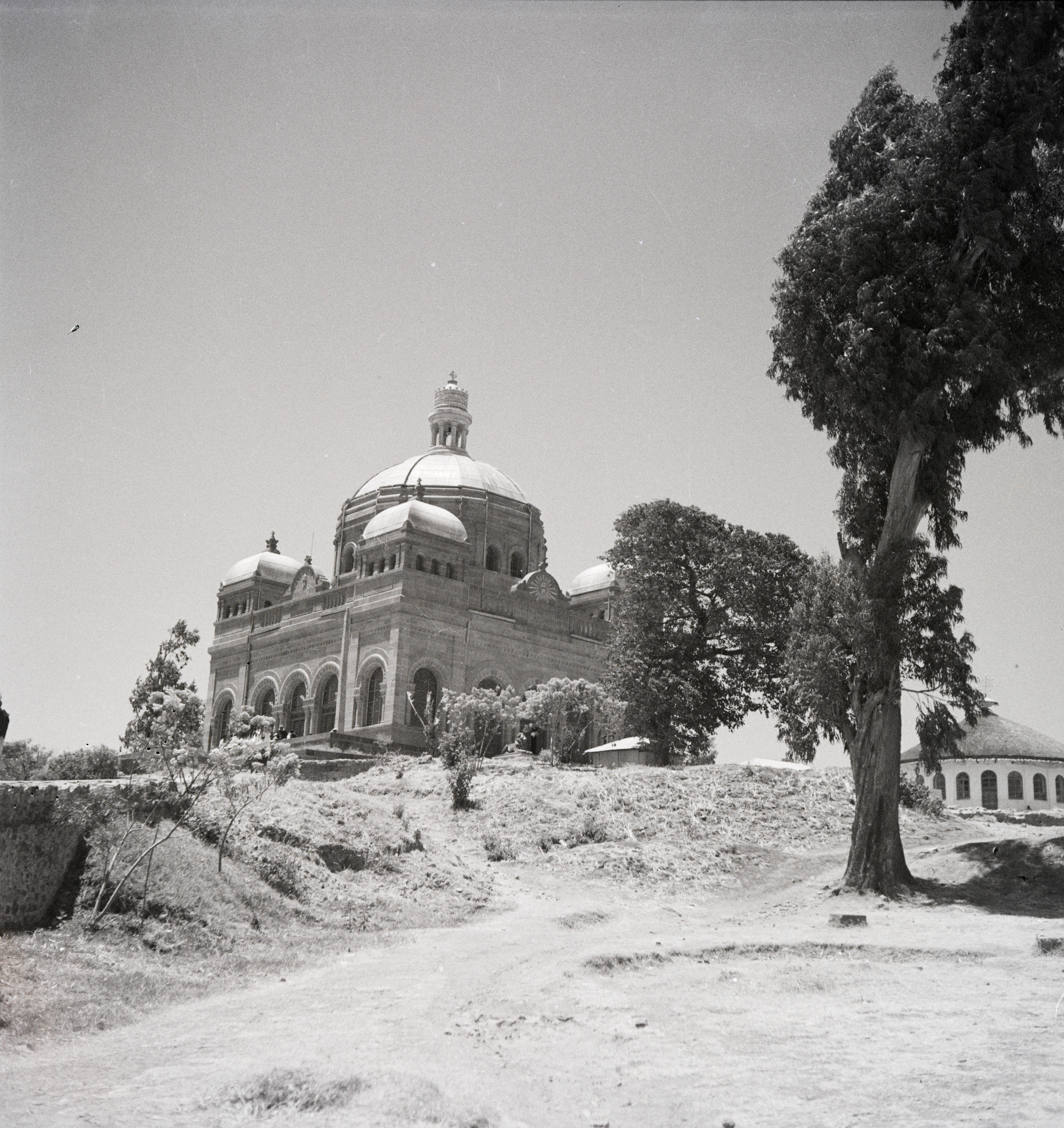
Mausoleum in 1934

=== Shengo Hall ===
The Shengo hall was built by the Derg at a cost of $18 million. It was prefabricated in Finland, and, at the time of its construction, was the largest prefabricated building in the world. It was opened on 9 September 1987 after the promulgation of the new constitution and election of the assembly, to a grand ceremony that counted Presidents Kenneth Kaunda of Zambia, Hassan Gouled Aptidon of Djibouti and Hosni Mubarak of Egypt as guests. After the fall of the Mengistu government, the Ethiopian Parliament convened its previous chambers, and today the building is used as an occasional meeting place.

=== Prime Minister's Office ===
The building now housing the Prime Minister's Office was built at the same time as the Shengo Hall to house the offices of President Mengistu Haile Mariam. After his ouster it became the Prime Minister's Office, and was renovated in 2018–2019.

== Bibliography ==
- Livio Sacchi: Architectural heritage in Ethiopia. Two imperial compounds in Mekele and Addis Ababa Skira, 2012 ISBN 978-8857217192
