= 1987 Ethiopian constitutional referendum =

A constitutional referendum was held in Ethiopia on 1 February 1987. The new constitution would make the country a one-party socialist state with the Communist Workers' Party of Ethiopia as the sole legal party. It was approved by 81% of voters, with a 96% turnout. It was promulgated on 22 February, inaugurating the People's Democratic Republic of Ethiopia.

== Background ==
The ruling Workers' Party of Ethiopia established a Constitutional Commission in February 1986. In August it presented a draft constitution with 119 articles. The document, modelled on the constitution of the Soviet Union, created a one-party state under the leadership of the WPE.

== Results ==
| Choice | Votes | % |
|---|---|---|
| For | | 81 |
| Against | | 19 |
| Total | | |
| Total votes | 14,035,718 | – |
| Registered voters/turnout | 14,570,011 | 96.33 |
Source: African Elections Database

== Aftermath ==
The results were published on 21 February and the constitution came into force on 22 February. General elections were held on 14 June, and the country was officially renamed the People's Democratic Republic of Ethiopia on 12 September.
