= Fikre Selassie Wogderess =

Prime Minister of Ethiopia from 1987 to 1989

- ፍቅረ ሥላሴ ወግደረስ

General Secretary of the Provisional Military Administrative Council
- In office 3 February 1977 – 10 September 1987
- Preceded by: Tafari Benti
- Succeeded by: Mengistu Haile Mariam

Prime Minister of Ethiopia
- In office 10 September 1987 – 8 November 1989
- President: Mengistu Haile Mariam
- Preceded by: Mikael Imru
- Succeeded by: Hailu Yimenu (acting)

Personal details
- Born: 13 July 1945 Addis Ababa, Ethiopia
- Died: 12 December 2020 (aged 75) Addis Ababa, Ethiopia
- Party: Workers' Party of Ethiopia

Military service
- Allegiance: Ethiopian Empire; Derg; PDR Ethiopia
- Branch/service: Ethiopian Air Force
- Years of service: 1961–1991
- Rank: Captain
- Battles/wars: Ethiopian Civil War; Eritrean War of Independence; Ogaden War

Fikre Selassie Wogderess (Amharic: ፍቅረ ሥላሴ ወግደረስ; 13 July 1945 – 12 December 2020) was an Ethiopian military officer and politician who served as the Prime Minister of Ethiopia from 10 September 1987 to 8 November 1989.

== Biography ==
Fikre Selassie Wagderes was born to his father, Wagderes Beretekhu, and his mother, Abebete Argaw, on July 13, 1945, in an area called Kechene in Addis Ababa. He completed his primary and secondary education at the Kechene Medhanialem Church Priest's School, Kusqam School, and Menelik II Secondary School. Due to his strong desire to serve his country in the military profession, he joined the Ethiopian Air Force on April 8, 1954. After successfully completing seven months of aircraft weapons and electronics training at the Air Force Technical School, they were sent to the United States in 1958 for advanced training at Andrews Air Force Training Center in Arizona.

Following this, Fikre Selassie returned to his homeland and completed his seven-month training as a candidate for the 6th course at the Air Force Officer Candidate School, graduating on October 30, 1961. The Ethiopian Air Force at that time was very enthusiastic about education, and although the young captain was given the opportunity to attend Haile Selassie University and pursue higher education, Fikre Selassie dropped out of school in his second year of study.

Originally a Captain in the Ethiopian Air Force, Fikre Selassie was one of the more obscure members of the Derg until the coup of 3 February 1977, in which Secretary-General Tafari Benti was killed along with seven other Derg members. The coup elevated him (Bahru Zewde notes "according to some sources from near execution by reason of mistaken identity!") to Secretary-General of Ethiopia's ruling military council, in which post he would occasionally dispel "the atmosphere of total sycophancy" with his "fractionally independent disposition."

Fikre Selassie became the first Prime Minister of the newly reorganized state and administration that (formality wise) replaced the Derg in September 1987. He made a trip to Cairo in November 1988 to seek improved relations with Egypt, and to express support for Egypt's offer to negotiate a settlement of the Eritrean conflict. In November 1989, President Mengistu Haile Mariam ordered him removed from his post, having criticized him three days prior in a meeting of the Politburo of the Workers' Party of Ethiopia, stating "there is no one quite like Fikre Selassie, who sits idly and quietly. One time, he sat here reading a magazine.... He is not antirevolutionary or a criminal, nor is he conspiratorial.... But he is unstable and even rude.... He is being expelled for disciplinary reasons also."

Following the conclusion of the Ethiopian Civil War and the end of the PDRE, Fikre was one of 46 former leaders of the PDRE who were tried in person beginning 19 April 1996 for murdering individuals, genocide, and crimes against humanity by the Federal Democratic Republic of Ethiopia; 22 more individuals, including the exiled Mengistu, were charged in absentia at the same trial. The trial ended on 26 May 2008, and Fikre Selassie Wogderess was sentenced to death. In December 2010, the Ethiopian government commuted the death sentence of Fikre Selassie and 23 other Derg officials. On 4 October 2011, Fikre Selassie was freed along with other 16 of his former colleagues, after twenty years of incarceration. The Ethiopian government paroled almost all of those Derg officials who had been jailed for 20 years.

== Death ==
Fikre Selassie Wogderess died on 12 December 2020 in hospital where he was recovering from COVID-19, as well as being treated for diabetes and kidney complications.
