= Tesfaye Dinka =

Ethiopian politician; acting Prime Minister of Ethiopia in 1991

Acting Prime Minister of Ethiopia
- In office 26 April 1991 – 6 June 1991
- President: Mengistu Haile Mariam
- Preceded by: Hailu Yimenu
- Succeeded by: Tamrat Layne

Minister of Foreign Affairs
- In office 1989–1991
- Preceded by: Berhanu Bayeh
- Succeeded by: Tesfaye Tadesse

Minister of Finance & Economic Development
- In office 1983–1986
- Preceded by: Teferra Wolde-Semait
- Succeeded by: Bekele Tamirat

Personal details
- Born: 3 November 1939 Ambo, Italian East Africa (present-day Ambo, Ethiopia)
- Died: 6 December 2016 (aged 77) Fairfax, Virginia, U.S.
- Education: Syracuse University; American University of Beirut

Tesfaye Dinka Yadessa (Amharic: ተስፋዬ ዲንቃ ያደሳ; 3 November 1939 – 6 December 2016) was an Ethiopian politician who was Minister of Finance (1983–1986), Minister of Foreign Affairs (1989–1991), and Prime Minister (26 April–6 June 1991) of Ethiopia. He was the head of the delegation of the Ethiopian Government during the London Conference of 1991 which aimed to end the Ethiopian Civil War.

== Early life ==
Born in 1939, in Ambo, Tesfaye was of Oromo descent. He did his elementary education in Ambo, and then attended the General Wingate Secondary School in Addis Ababa. He did his BA from the American University of Beirut, and an MBA and MSc in industrial engineering from Syracuse University.

== Political career ==
He was a leading member of the regime of Mengistu Haile Mariam and alternate member of the Politburo of the Workers' Party of Ethiopia. Prior to his appointment as prime minister, Tesfaye served in various ministerial posts, successively as Acting Minister of National Resources Development, Minister of Industry, Finance, and Foreign Affairs; he also served as Deputy Prime Minister of the People's Democratic Republic of Ethiopia since 1987. He was the member of Mengistu's civilian high-level officials with no blood on his hand. He was a technocrat and had no say on Mengistu's monumental decision such as the infamous collectivization program of the mid-80s which uprooted thousands peasants from the northern part of the country and resettled them in the southern and western part of Ethiopia. Tesfaye Dinka is considered by many to have been a moderate member of the Mengistu regime, and part of the faction of government officials who advised Mengistu to negotiate with the Eritrean People's Liberation Front (EPLF) and the Tigray People's Liberation Front (TPLF).

In the last days of Mengistu's rule, he was appointed prime minister. He led the government delegation to the abortive London peace conference of 27 May 1991, which was intended to broker an end to the Ethiopian Civil War. Other attendees included Isaias Afwerki who led the EPLF, Meles Zenawi the leader of the TPLF, and Lencho Letta the deputy secretary general of the Oromo Liberation Front. US Assistant Secretary of State Herman J. Cohen served as mediator. Ostensibly, the conference was supposed to explore ways to set up a transitional government in Ethiopia, but it was overtaken by events before its formal start. The talks had yet to get under way when Cohen received a message claiming that Lieutenant General Tesfaye Gebre Kidan, acting President of Ethiopia, had lost control of the government's remaining armed units and Addis Ababa was threatened with a complete breakdown of law and order. To prevent uncontrolled destruction and looting, Cohen recommended that EPRDF forces immediately move into Addis Ababa and establish control. Although Tesfaye Dinka strenuously objected, he spoke from a position of weakness and could not prevail. He and the government delegation publicly stated that they will boycott the meeting, and thus the London conference continued the next day without the participation of the government delegation.

== Post 1991 Revolution ==
Tesfaye worked in the 1990s for the World Bank and other agencies. He lived for years in the U.S. and was a senior advisor to the Global Coalition for Africa, an organization dedicated to the economic development of Africa. Tesfaye died on 6 December 2016 in Fairfax, Virginia, aged 77, and was survived by his wife, four children and four grandchildren.
