= Hailu Yimenu =

Prime Minister of Ethiopia from 1989 to 1991

Acting Prime Minister of Ethiopia
- In office 8 November 1989 – 26 April 1991
- President: Mengistu Haile Mariam
- Preceded by: Fikre Selassie Wogderess
- Succeeded by: Tesfaye Dinka

Personal details
- Died: 1993 Addis Ababa, Ethiopia

Hailu Yimenu (Amharic: ሃይሉ ይመኑ; died 1993) was an Ethiopian politician who was the acting prime minister of the People's Democratic Republic of Ethiopia from 8 November 1989 until 26 April 1991. He was one of the appointed deputy prime ministers in 1987.

== Later life ==
In May 1991, after hearing of Mengistu Haile Mariam's fall from power, he fled to the Italian embassy in Addis Ababa, along with Lieutenant General Tesfaye Gebre Kidan, Foreign Minister Berhanu Bayeh, and Chief of General Staff Addis Tedla. He was succeeded by Tesfaye Dinka.

While the other three remained at the embassy for years, Hailu killed himself at the embassy in 1993.

Following the death of General Tesfaye thirteen years later on 2 June 2004, rumors began to circulate caused by the embassy's lack of detail on the death of both General Tesfaye and Hailu's earlier suicide. The Ethiopian government demanded Italian records on the incidents during that month.
