= Mikael Imru =

Prime Minister of Ethiopia in 1974

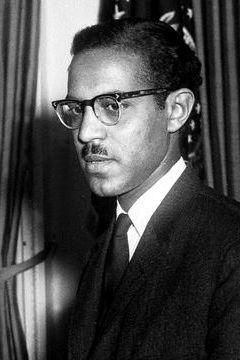

Prime Minister of Ethiopia
- In office 3 August 1974 – 12 September 1974
- Monarch: Haile Selassie I
- Preceded by: Endelkachew Makonnen
- Succeeded by: Post abolished (1974–1987); Fikre Selassie Wogderess

Minister of Foreign Affairs
- In office 1961–1961
- Preceded by: Haddis Alemayehu
- Succeeded by: Ketema Yifru

Personal details
- Born: 21 November 1929 Addis Ababa, Ethiopian Empire
- Died: 26 October 2008 (aged 78) Addis Ababa, Ethiopia
- Resting place: Holy Trinity Cathedral, Addis Ababa, Ethiopia
- Party: Independent
- Spouse: Woizero Almaz
- Children: Lij Sahlu Mikael; Lij Gobena Mikael Imru; Woizerit Laqech Mikael Imru
- Parent(s): Leul Ras Imru Haile Selassie; Woizero Tsige Mariam
- Education: Oxford University

Lij Mikael Imru (Amharic: ሚካኤል እምሩ; 21 November 1929 – 26 October 2008) was an Ethiopian politician who was Prime Minister of Ethiopia from 3 August to 12 September 1974. He served as the Minister of Foreign Affairs in 1961.

== Biography ==
Born in Addis Ababa, Mikael was the only son of Leul Ras Imru Haile Selassie and Woizero Tsige Mariam; he had seven sisters. His father, Leul Ras Imru Haile Selassie was among the more senior princes of the Imperial Dynasty of Ethiopia, and a close confidant of emperor Haile Selassie, a close relative with whom he had grown up. (Mikael's paternal grandmother was the Emperor's first cousin.) Mikael was thus born into the highest levels of Ethiopian society, and was a member of the extended Imperial dynasty. Both Mikael and his father were known to have very strong socialist leanings, particularly in regard to land tenure and wealth distribution issues.

Mikael studied at Oxford University and subsequently returned to Ethiopia. Mikael served as deputy Secretary of Agriculture between 1958 and 1959. Subsequently, he became a diplomat and was first posted to Washington, D.C. (1959–1961), then to Moscow (1961–1965). For a few months between these diplomatic posts Mikael served as Foreign Minister. From 1965 to 1968 he worked in Geneva for the United Nations Conference on Trade and Development (UNCTAD). After first becoming in 1974 the Minister of Trade and Industry, Mikael was appointed prime minister by the Emperor, succeeding Endelkachew Makonnen. Upon the deposition of Emperor Haile Selassie, Mikael resigned from the office of prime minister on 12 September. Nevertheless, he served into the following year as Minister of Information. Although he was of royal blood, his long standing leftist sympathies led the Derg administration to spare him the fate of the rest of the Imperial dynasty, and he was never imprisoned as most of his relatives and former colleagues were.

Mikael became a specialist for rural development and worked at the World Bank. He also actively lobbied the Italian government for the return of art objects looted from Ethiopia during their occupation of that country, and became increasingly active in the areas of human rights in the post-Derg era.

Mikael died after a long illness in Addis Ababa on 26 October 2008, and was buried at Holy Trinity Cathedral.
