= Polygamy in Ethiopia =

Polygamy is a system of marriage in which one man marries more than one woman

While polygamy in Ethiopia has been formally abolished in the Family and Criminal Code of Ethiopia, the practice is still common, with five percent of married Ethiopian men (mostly among Muslims and pagans) having more than one wife.

A story about a polygamous man, Ayatu Nure, made international news. He has 12 wives with whom he bore a total of 78 children. In thar case, the polygamous man admitted to not having a good understanding of family planning.
