= Tamrat Layne =

Prime Minister of Ethiopia from 1991 to 1995 (born 1955)

- ታምራት ላይኔ
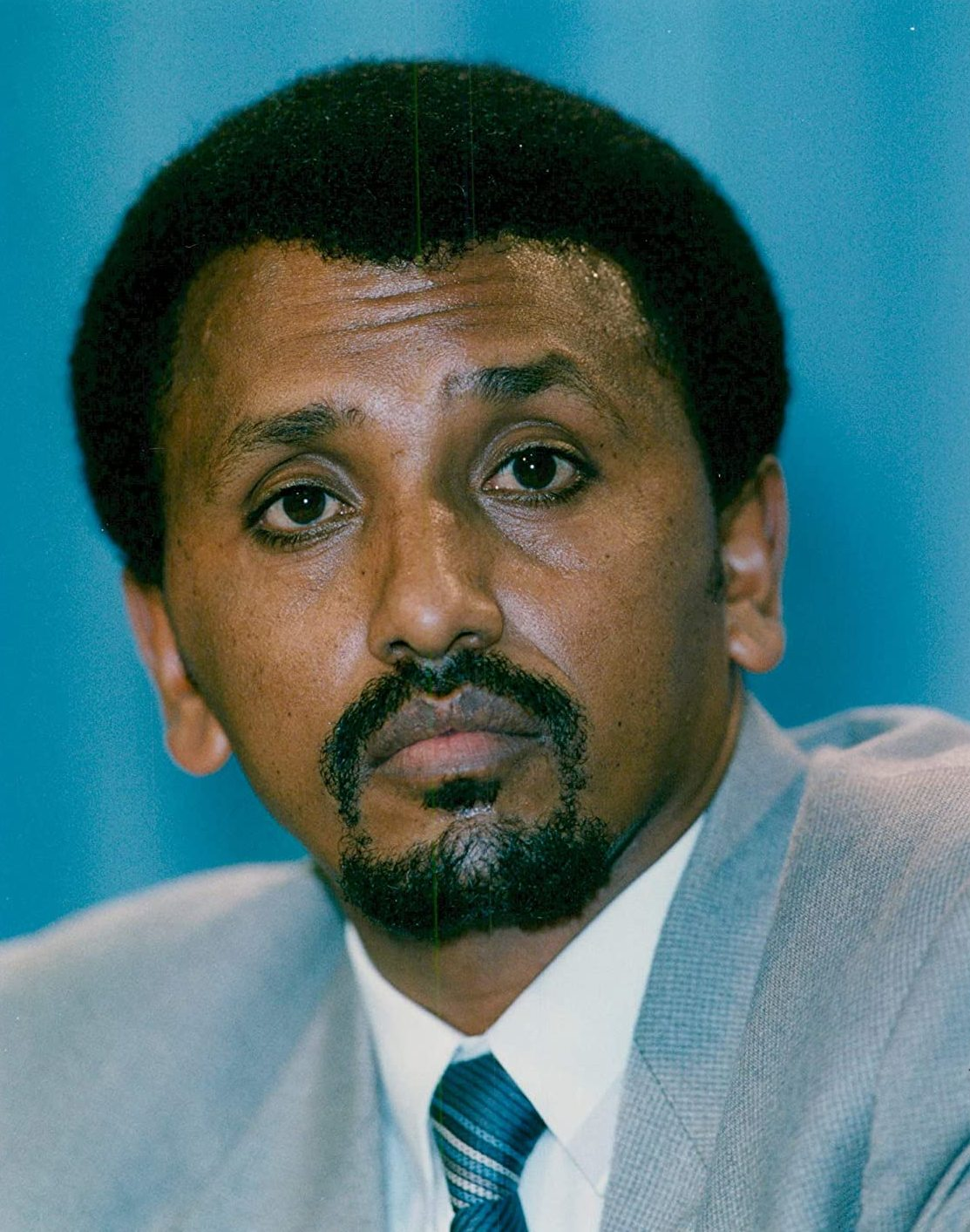
- Tamrat in 1992

Interim Prime Minister of Ethiopia
- In office 6 June 1991 – 22 August 1995
- President: Meles Zenawi
- Preceded by: Tesfaye Dinka
- Succeeded by: Meles Zenawi

Personal details
- Born: 1955 (age 70–71) Addis Ababa, Ethiopian Empire
- Party: Amhara National Democratic Movement
- Other political affiliations: Ethiopian People's Revolutionary Democratic Front

Tamrat Layne Admassu (Ge'ez: ታምራት ላይኔ አድማሱ; born 1955) is an Ethiopian former politician who served as the Prime Minister of Ethiopia during the Transitional Government of Ethiopia after the end of the Derg regime. Previously during the 1980s, he was a leader of the Ethiopian People's Democratic Movement (the forerunner of the Amhara National Democratic Movement), one of the groups that fought against Ethiopian dictator Mengistu Haile Mariam in the Ethiopian Civil War.

== Biography ==
Tamrat Layne was born in 1955 and raised by a single mother in Addis Ababa. He led the Ethiopian People's Democratic Movement during the 1980s, fighting against Mengistu Haile Mariam in the Ethiopian Civil War. In an interview in 1988, he acknowledged that the goals of his movement were similar to that of the Tigrayan People's Liberation Front, such as its approach to national self-determination and foreign affairs. A self-proclaimed atheist, he believed that "freedom comes out of the barrel of the gun."

When Mengistu was overthrown in 1991, Tamrat Layne became one of the three-man EPRDF-TPLF ruling the country and then in the democratically elected government, the other members being Meles Zenawi (President) and Siye Abraha (Minister of Defence). His position was Prime Minister of the Transitional Government, in which capacity he served from 6 June 1991 until 22 August 1995, when President Meles Zenawi succeeded him as Prime Minister. While in power, he realized that his communist-socialist ideology was mistaken. He staffed important government posts with friends. Tamrat became deputy prime minister until October 1996. He also served as Minister of Defense.

On 16 March 2000 the Federal Supreme Court of Ethiopia sentenced Tamrat to 18 years in prison after being convicted of corruption and embezzlement charges. He was accused of being involved in an illegal 16 million-dollar deal with a business to export Ethiopian textiles and 1,000 tons of state-owned coffee through a fake company. He claimed to be innocent of all charges against him. Kept in solitary confinement, he studied Buddhism, Islam, and eventually Christianity after a nurse slipped him Christian literature. He reported that while in prison, over the course of three consecutive nights he encountered a figure that he identified as Jesus Christ. After serving 12 years of his 18-year sentence, Tamrat was released from prison in December 2008. He is currently an active member of Christian churches across the United States with his teachings of self understanding and life's purpose. Since then, he has shared his faith experience with others. He has made appearances at several churches and universities.
