= 1987 Constitution of Ethiopia =

Constitution of the People's Democratic Republic of Ethiopia

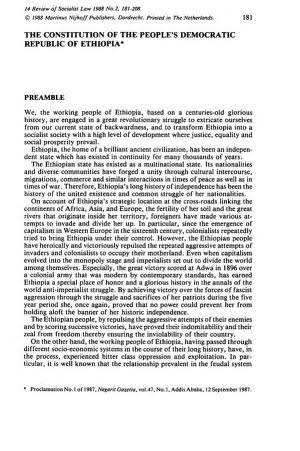

Overview
- Jurisdiction: People's Democratic Republic of Ethiopia (present day Ethiopia and Eritrea)
- Presented: June 1986
- Date effective: 22 February 1987; 39 years ago
- System: Unitary Marxist-Leninist one-party socialist republic
- Executive: National Shengo

The Constitution of the People's Democratic Republic of Ethiopia (Amharic: የኢትዮጵያ ሕዝቦች ዴሞክራሲያዊ ሪፐብሊክ ሕገ መንግሥት, romanized: Ye-Ītyōṗṗyā Həzbāwī Dīmōkrāsīyāwī Rīpeblīk Ḥige Menigišit), also known as the 1987 Constitution of Ethiopia, was a communist state constitution and Ethiopia's third constitution overall. It went into effect on 22 February 1987 after a referendum on 1 February of that year. Its adoption inaugurated the People's Democratic Republic of Ethiopia (PDRE).

== Contents ==
The document consisted of seventeen chapters and 119 articles. The preamble traced Ethiopia's origins back to antiquity, proclaimed the historical heroism of its people, praised the country's substantial natural and human resources, and pledged to continue the struggle against imperialism, poverty, and hunger. The government's primary concern was proclaimed to be the country's development through the implementation of the Program for the National Democratic Revolution, which Kasahun Ankosa had proclaimed in a speech on 20 April 1976. In the process, it was assumed that the material and technical bases necessary for establishing socialism would be created.

The constitution attempted to situate Ethiopia in the context of the worldwide movement of "progressive states" and made no direct reference to Africa. Critics claim that the constitution was no more than an abridged version of the 1977 Soviet constitution. A notable exception was the rejection of the Soviet Union's collective head of state in favor of a presidency with sweeping—indeed, near dictatorial—executive powers. A second difference between the Ethiopian and Soviet constitutions is that the former declared the country to be a unitary state rather than a federation. It was reported that the problem of nationalities was hotly debated in the Constitutional Commission, as well as in the WPE Central Committee, but the regime would not abandon its desire to create a single multiethnic state rather than a federation.

The 835-member legislature, the National Shengo, was defined as the supreme state organ of power. Its members were elected to five-year terms. Executive power was vested in a president, elected by the National Shengo for a five-year term, and a cabinet also appointed by the Shengo. The president was ex officio chairman of the Council of State, the country's highest executive body. Officially defined as a permanent standing committee of the Shengo, the Council of State had the power to act for the Shengo when it was not in session (in practice, for most of the year). During this time, it could issue "special decrees" in lieu of law. If such decrees did not get the consent of the Shengo at its next session, they were considered revoked.

Actual power, however, rested in the Workers' Party of Ethiopia, defined as the leading force of state and society. More specifically, actual power rested with Mengistu, who was not only president of the country but general secretary of the WPE. He and the other surviving members of the Derg dominated the WPE's Politburo. In essence, the power structure set up by the constitution was a carbon copy of the power structure in other Communist countries. The party was granted even more power than the government, which acted more or less as a transmission belt for the party. As was the case with other Communist legislatures, the National Shengo was nominally vested with great lawmaking powers, but the principles of democratic centralism reduced it to merely a rubber stamp for decisions already made by the WPE and its Politburo. For instance, the Shengo's power to veto "special decrees" issued by the Council of State was almost never exercised in practice, meaning that these decrees effectively had the force of law.

The Constitution guaranteed all manner of civil rights and personal freedoms, such as freedom of speech, the press, religion, movement, assembly, and association. Citizens also had the right to a fair trial and a free education. In practice, the government paid almost no attention to these freedoms. As had been the case during the Derg era, arbitrary arrests, torture, and execution ran rampant, and Ethiopia ranked at or near the bottom of most measures of human rights and civil liberties.

== Drafting ==
The primary task facing the Workers' Party of Ethiopia (WPE) following its formation in 1984 was to devise the new national constitution that would inaugurate the PDRE. In March 1986, a 343-member Constitutional Commission was formed to draft a new constitution based on the principles of scientific socialism. Eventually, the 122 full and alternate members of the WPE Central Committee who had been appointed to its membership dominated the commission.

The Constitutional Commission had its origins in the Institute for the Study of Ethiopian Nationalities, which the Provisional Military Administrative Council (better known as the Derg) had established in March 1983 to find solutions to problems resulting from Ethiopia's vast ethnic diversity. The institute was staffed mostly by academics from Addis Ababa University, who continued to serve as advisers to the Constitutional Commission. The commission's diverse membership included religious leaders, artists, writers, doctors, academics, athletes, workers, and former nobility. There was also an attempt by those who chose appointees to the commission to make sure that all major ethnic nationalities had representation in the body.

For about six months, the commission debated the details of the new constitution. In June 1986, it issued a 120-article draft document. The government printed and distributed 1 million copies to kebeles and peasant associations throughout the country. During the next two months, the draft was discussed at about 25,000 locations. The regime used this method of discussion to legitimize the constitution-making process and to test the mood of the populace. In some cases, people attended constitutional discussion sessions only after pressure from local WPE cadres, but in other cases attendance was voluntary. Where popular interest was apparent, it centered on issues such as taxes, the role of religion, marriage, the organization of elections, and citizenship rights and obligations. By far the most controversial draft provision was the one that outlawed polygamy, which caused a furor among Muslims. Few questions were raised about the document's failure to address the nationalities problem and the right to self-determination. According to government officials, the citizenry submitted more than 500,000 suggested revisions. In August the commission reconvened to consider proposed amendments. In all, the commission accepted ninety-five amendments to the original draft, most of which, however, were cosmetic.

== Referendum ==
The national referendum on the constitution was held on 1 February 1987, and Mengistu announced the results three weeks later. He reported that 96 percent of the 14 million people eligible to participate (adults eighteen years of age and older) voted. Eighty-one percent of the electorate endorsed the constitution, while 18 percent opposed it (1 percent of the ballots were invalid). Although this was the first election in Ethiopia's history based on universal suffrage, the presence of WPE cadres throughout the country ensured that the constitution would be adopted. In Tigray and Eritrea, however, the regime held referendums only in urban centers because much of these territories was controlled by the Tigray People's Liberation Front and the Eritrean People's Liberation Front, respectively. In other places, such as parts of Wollo and Gondar regions, the vote took place amid heightened security measures.

Although the constitution officially took effect on the same day the PDRE was proclaimed 22 February 1987, it was not until that September the new government was fully in place and the Derg formally abolished.
