= People's Democratic Republic of Ethiopia =

1987–1991 communist state in Ethiopia and Eritrea

People's Democratic Republic of Ethiopia የኢትዮጵያ ሕዝባዊ ዲሞክራሲያዊ ሪፐብሊክ (Amharic) Ye-Ītyōṗṗyā Həzbāwī Dīmōkrāsīyāwī Rīpeblīk
- 1987–1991
- Flag Emblem
- Anthem: ኢትዮጵያ, ኢትዮጵያ, ኢትዮጵያ ቅደሚ; Ītyoṗya, Ītyoṗya, Ītyoṗya, qidä mī (English: "Ethiopia, Ethiopia, Ethiopia be first")
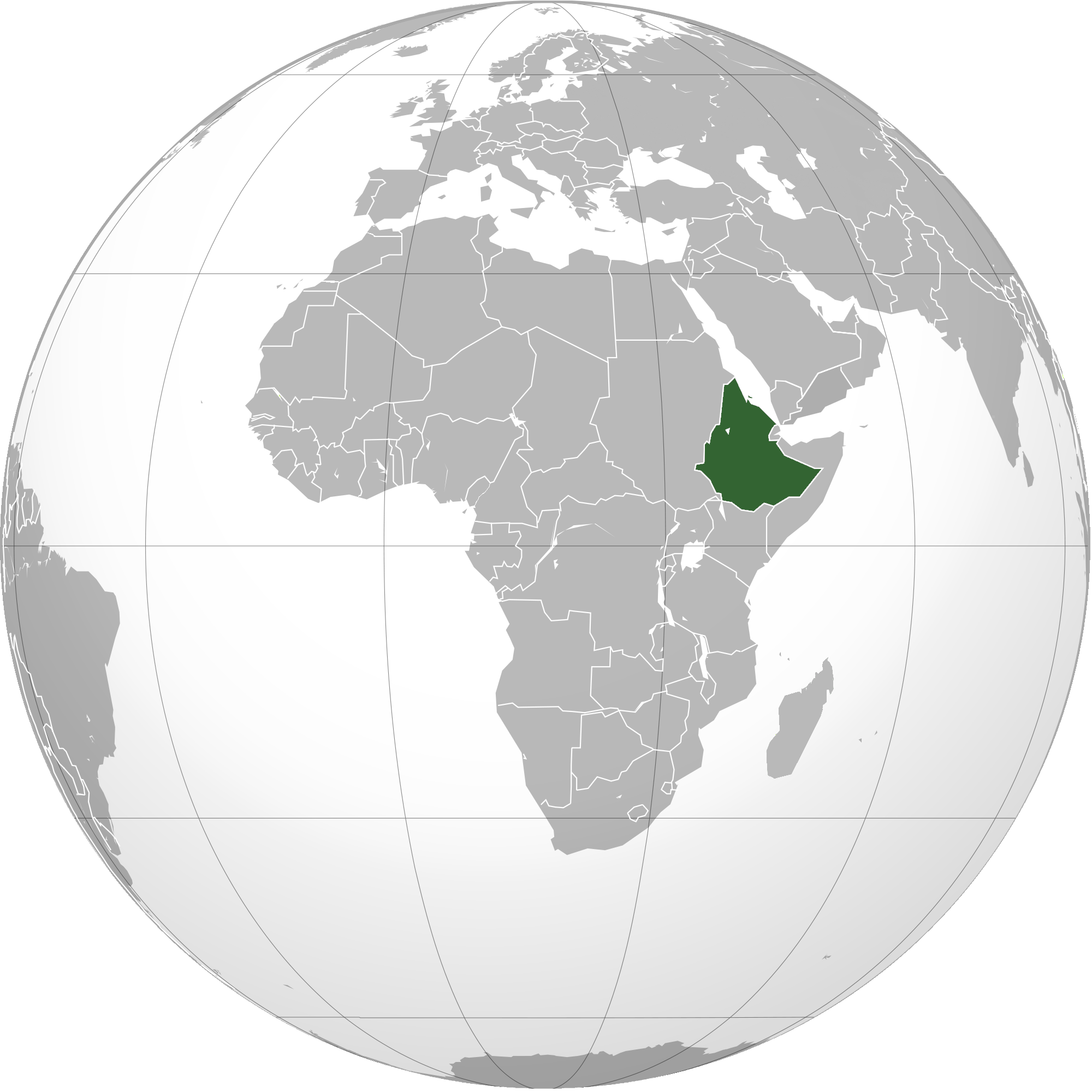
- The People's Democratic Republic of Ethiopia in 1991
- Capital and largest city: Addis Ababa
- Official languages: Amharic
- Religion: State atheism
- Government: Unitary communist state
- General Secretary
  - 1987–1991: Mengistu Haile Mariam
- President
  - 1987–1991: Mengistu Haile Mariam
  - 1991: Tesfaye Gebre Kidan
- Prime Minister
  - 1987–1989: Fikre Selassie Wogderess
  - 1989–1991: Hailu Yimenu
  - 1991: Tesfaye Dinka
- Legislature: National Shengo
- Historical era: Cold War
  - Constitution adopted: 22 February 1987
  - Fall of Addis Ababa: 28 May 1991

Area
- 1987: 1,221,900 km^{2} (471,800 sq mi)
- 1991: 1,127,127 km^{2} (435,186 sq mi)

Population
  - 1987: 42,460,039
  - 1991: 49,717,197
- Currency: Ethiopian birr (ETB)
- Calling code: +251
- ISO 3166 code: ET
Preceded by	Succeeded by
Derg	Transitional Government of Ethiopia; Eritrea
- Today part of: Eritrea; Ethiopia

The People's Democratic Republic of Ethiopia (PDRE; Amharic: የኢትዮጵያ ሕዝባዊ ዲሞክራሲያዊ ሪፐብሊክ, romanized: Ye-Ītyōṗṗyā Həzbāwī Dīmōkrāsīyāwī Rīpeblīk) was a unitary communist state that existed in Ethiopia and present-day Eritrea from 1987 to 1991.

The PDRE was established in February 1987 as a communist state upon the adoption of the 1987 Constitution, three weeks after its approval in the national referendum. The Derg, the military junta that had ruled Ethiopia as a provisional government since 1974, planned for transition to civilian rule and proclaimed a people's democratic state in 1984 after five years of preparation. The Workers' Party of Ethiopia (WPE) was founded that same year as a vanguard party led by Derg chairman Mengistu Haile Mariam. The Derg was dissolved with the proclamation of the PDRE, but continued to rule de facto until September when the new government took office, three months after the June general election. It was dominated by surviving Derg members, with Mengistu as both President of Ethiopia and General Secretary of the WPE.

The PDRE's government was highly centralized with a de facto power structure similar to other communist states. The legislature, the National Shengo, was nominally the supreme state organ of power. A president served as head of state and head of government, with sweeping executive and legislative powers. The president served as chairman of the Council of State, which acted for the Shengo between sessions. In practice, the principles of democratic centralism meant that the Shengo did little more than rubber-stamp decisions already made by the WPE and its Politburo. As both president and party leader, Mengistu and the surviving members of the Derg dominated the WPE's Politburo.

The PDRE inherited issues that ravaged Ethiopia during the Derg era including the 1983–1985 famine, reliance on foreign aid, and the decline of the world communist movement. The Soviet Union ended support of the PDRE in 1990, and internal conflict brought on by the Ethiopian Civil War and Eritrean War of Independence saw the WPE's authority increasingly challenged by ethnic militias and anti-government groups. In May 1991, Mengistu fled into exile. The regime only lasted another week before the Ethiopian People's Revolutionary Democratic Front entered Addis Ababa, dissolving the PDRE and replacing it with the Transitional Government of Ethiopia.

== Advances ==
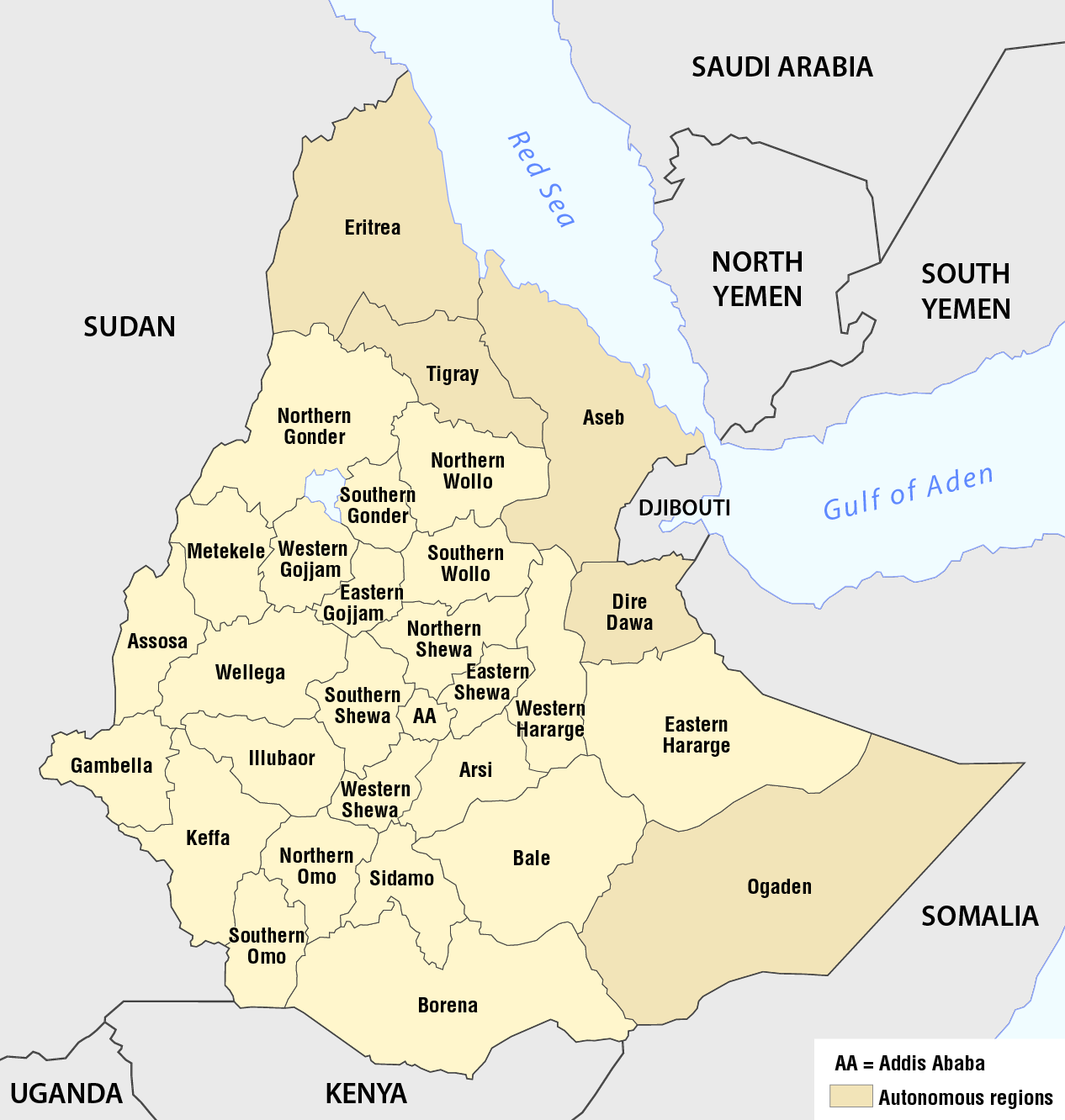
PDRE administrative divisions

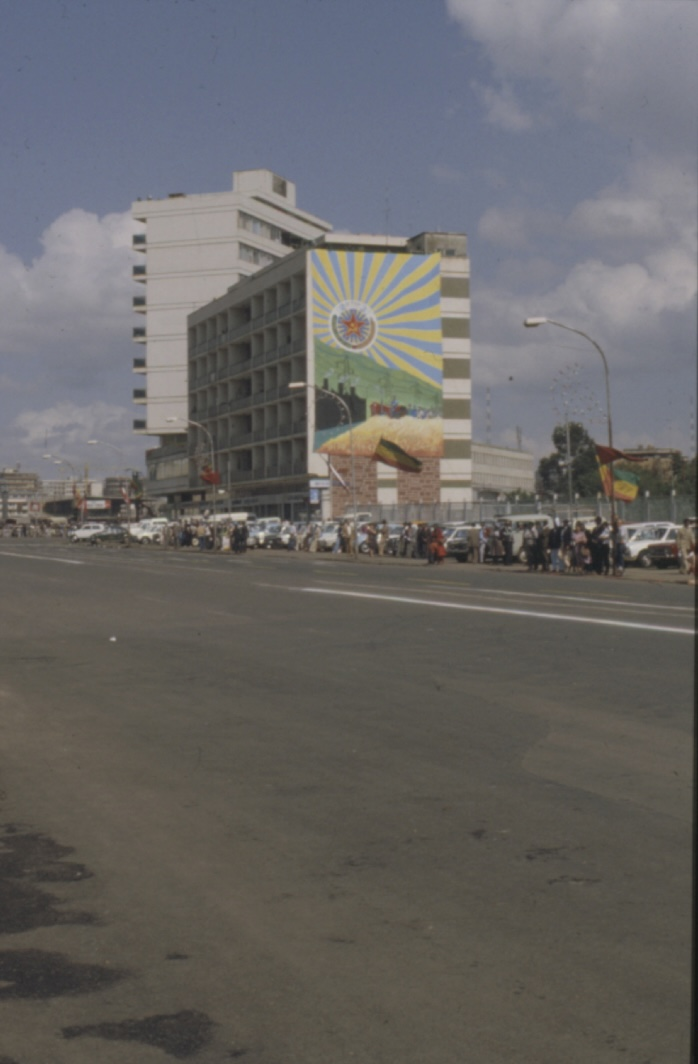
Addis Ababa during Derg rule

Following the demise of imperial rule, the feudal socioeconomic structure was dismantled through a series of reforms which also affected educational development. By early 1975, the government had closed Haile Selassie I University and all senior secondary schools, then deployed the approximately 60,000 students and teachers to rural areas to promote the government's "Development Through Cooperation Campaign". The campaign's purposes were to promote land reform and improve agricultural production, health, and local administration and to teach peasants about the new political and social order.

Primary school enrollment increased from about 957,300 in 1974/75 to nearly 2,450,000 in 1985/86. There were still variations among regions in the number of students enrolled and a disparity in the enrollment of boys and girls. Nevertheless, while the enrollment of boys more than doubled, that of girls more than tripled. However, with most of the rebel controlled northern Ethiopia regions as well as parts of Somali and Oromo regions out of the government's control, most of its claims were not perceived to be comprehensive.

The number of senior secondary schools almost doubled as well, with fourfold increases in Arsi, Bale, Gojjam, Gondar, and Wollo. The pre-revolutionary distribution of schools had shown a concentration in the urban areas of a few administrative regions. In 1974/75 about 55 percent of senior secondary schools were in Eritrea and Shewa, including Addis Ababa. In 1985/86 the figure was down to 40 percent. Although there were significantly fewer girls enrolled at the secondary level, the proportion of females in the school system at all levels and in all regions increased from about 32 percent in 1974/75 to 39 percent in 1985/86.

Among the PDRE's successes was the national literacy campaign. The literacy rate, under 10 percent during the imperial regime, increased to about 63 percent by 1984. In 1990/91 an adult literacy rate of just over 60 percent was still being reported in government as well as in some international reports. Officials originally conducted the literacy training in five languages: Amharic, Oromo, Tigrinya, Wolaytta, and Somali. The number of languages was later expanded to fifteen, which represented about 93 percent of the population.

A number of countries were generous in helping the PDRE meet its health care needs. Cuba, the Soviet Union, and a number of East European countries provided medical assistance. In early 1980, nearly 300 Cuban medical technicians, including more than 100 physicians, supported local efforts to resolve public health problems. Western aid for long-term development of Ethiopia's health sector was modest, averaging about US$10 million annually, the lowest per capita assistance in sub-Saharan Africa. The main Western donors included Italy and Sweden. The UN system led by UNDP and including such agencies as FAO, UNESCO, UNICEF, UNIDO, UNFPA and WHO, continued to extend assistance as they had to the Emperor's regime. In the early 1980s, at least one UNDP representative, a former minister in a Caribbean country, had the credibility to get access to Mengistu, and may have moderated his excesses in some instances. The World Bank also continued to provide assistance during his rule doubtless recognising the surprisingly conservative and prudent fiscal discipline the regime tried to follow.

=== Failures and collapse ===
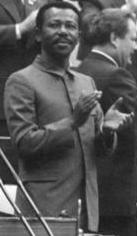
President Mengistu Haile Mariam in 1986.

Ethiopia had never recovered from the previous great famine of the early 1970s, which was the result of a drought that affected most of the countries of the African Sahel. The famine was also caused by an imbalance of population which was concentrated in the highland areas, which were free of malaria and trypanosomiasis. Both the Emperor's and Mengistu's regimes had tried to resettle people in the lowlands, but the Mengistu regime came in for heavy international criticism on the grounds that the resettlements were forced.

There has been an approximately decade long cycle of recurrent droughts in this part of east Africa since earlier in the 20th century and by the late 1970s signs of intensifying drought began to appear. By the early 1980s, large numbers of people in central Eritrea, Tigray, Welo, and parts of Begemder and Shewa were beginning to feel the effects of renewed famine.

A drought that began in 1969 continued as dry weather brought disaster to the Sahel and swept eastward through the Horn of Africa. By 1973 the attendant famine had threatened the lives of hundreds of thousands of Ethiopian nomads, who had to leave their home grounds and struggle into Somalia, Djibouti, Kenya, and Sudan, seeking relief from starvation. By the end of 1973, famine had claimed the lives of about 300,000 peasants of Tigray and Welo, and thousands more had sought relief in Ethiopian towns and villages.

The PDRE's limited ability to lead development and to respond to crises was dramatically demonstrated by the government's reliance on foreign famine relief between 1984 and 1989. By 1983 armed conflict between the government and opposition movements in the north had combined with drought to contribute to mass starvation in Eritrea, Tigray, and Welo. Meanwhile, drought alone was having a devastating impact on an additional nine regions. This natural disaster far exceeded the drought of 1973–74, which had contributed to the downfall of Emperor Haile Selassie. By early 1985, some 7.7 million people were suffering from drought and food shortages. Of that number, 2.5 million were at immediate risk of starving.

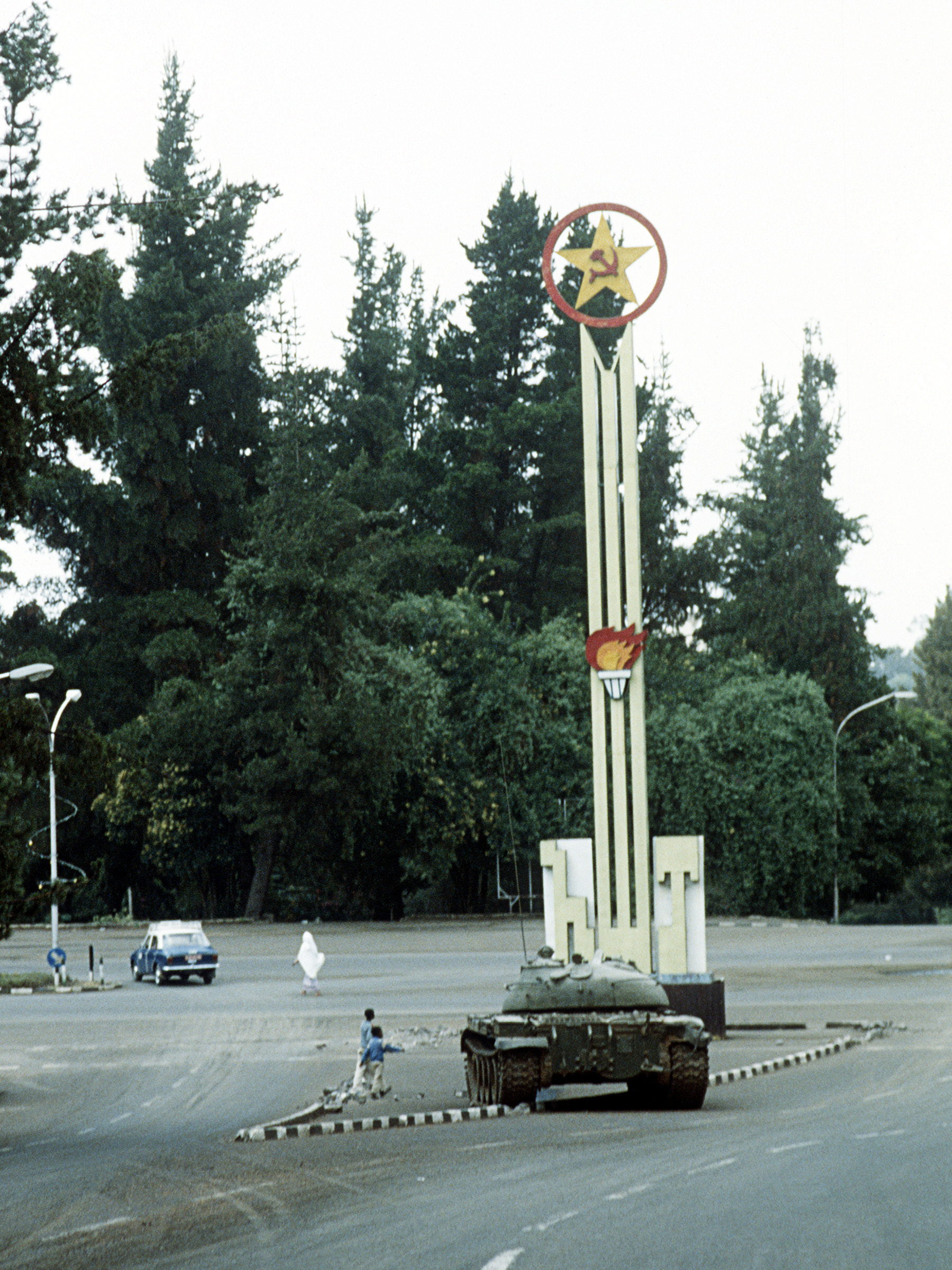
Tanks in the streets of Addis Ababa after rebels seized the capital

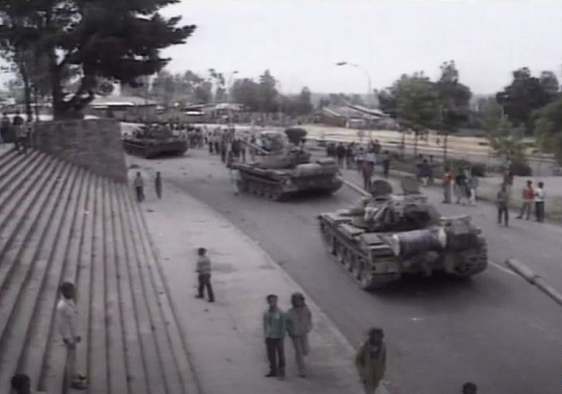
Rebel forces tanks in Addis Abeba, 1991.

As it had in the past, in the mid-1980s the international community responded generously to Ethiopia's tragedy once the dimensions of the crisis became understood, although the FAO had been warning of food security problems for several years before the famine hit. Bilateral, multilateral, and private donations of food and other relief supplies poured into the country by late 1984. In 1987 another drought threatened 5 million people in Eritrea and Tigray. This time, however, the international community was better prepared to get food to the affected areas in time to prevent starvation and massive population movements. According to library of Congress studies, "many supporters of the Ethiopian regime opposed its policy of withholding food shipments to rebel areas. The combined effects of famine and internal war had by then put the nation's economy into a state of collapse." Also according to Human Rights Watch's reports and research, the counter-insurgency strategy of the PDRE caused the famine to strike one year earlier than would otherwise have been the case, and forced people to migrate to relief shelters and refugee camps. The economic war against the peasants caused the famine to spread to other areas of the country. If the famine had struck only in 1984/5, and only affected the "core" areas of Tigray and North Wollo (3.1 million affected people), and caused only one quarter of the number to migrate to camps, the death toll would have been 175,000 (on the optimistic assumptions) and 273,000 (on the pessimistic assumptions). Thus between 225,000 and 317,000 deaths—rather more than half of those caused by the famine—can be blamed on the government's human rights violations.

He was succeeded on an interim basis by Vice President Tesfaye Gebre Kidan. However, with the rebels closing in on Addis Ababa from all sides, the PDRE only survived another week. In late May, while peace talks were underway, Tesfaye notified American officials that he had lost the ability to maintain order, and could no longer command what remained of the army. Washington then cleared the way for the rebels to take over the capital on May 28.

== Politics ==
=== Security ===
- Ethiopian Revolutionary Armed Forces - Military
  - Ethiopian Army
  - Ethiopian Air Force
  - Ethiopian Navy
  - People's Militia
- People's Protection Brigades - Law enforcement
- Central Revolutionary Investigation Department - Secret police

=== Leaders ===
==== Presidents ====
- Mengistu Haile Mariam (September 10, 1987 – May 21, 1991)
- Tesfaye Gebre Kidan (acting; May 21, 1991 – May 28, 1991)

==== Prime Ministers ====
- Fikre Selassie Wogderess (September 10, 1987 – November 8, 1989)
- Hailu Yimenu (acting; November 8, 1989 – April 26, 1991)
- Tesfaye Dinka (acting; April 26, 1991 – June 6, 1991)

== See also ==
- 1987 Constitution of Ethiopia
- Ethiopian general election, 1987
