= Transitional Government of Ethiopia =

Provisional government of Ethiopia (1991–1995)

Coordinates: 9°1.8′N 38°44.4′E

Provisional Government of Ethiopia
- Cabinet of Ethiopia

- Date formed: 28 May 1991
- Date dissolved: 21 August 1995

People and organisations
- Head of government: Tamrat Layne
- Member parties: Tigrayan People's Liberation Front; Oromo People's Democratic Organization; Amhara National Democratic Movement; Southern Ethiopian People's Democratic Movement
- Status in legislature: Coalition

History
- Successor: Zenawi cabinet

The Transitional Government of Ethiopia (TGE) was an era established immediately after the Ethiopian People's Revolutionary Democratic Front (EPRDF) seized power from the Marxist-Leninist People's Democratic Republic of Ethiopia (PDRE) in 1991. During the transitional period, Meles Zenawi served as the president of the TGE while Tamrat Layne was prime minister. Among other major shifts in the country's political institutions, it was under the authority of the TGE that the realignment of provincial boundaries on the basis of ethnolinguistic identity occurred. The TGE was in power until 1995, when it transitioned into the reconstituted Federal Democratic Republic of Ethiopia that remains today.

== Background ==
In May 1991, the PDRE (1987-1991) was overthrown by forces consisting of the TPLF and the TPLF-controlled EPRDF with the promise that a recognition of human rights, democracy, the liberalization of the economic sector, and political rehabilitation were soon to follow. The PDRE, the country's newest civilian regime, was actually dominated by leaders of the preceding Derg (1974-1987) a military junta led by Mengistu Haile Mariam that seized power by overthrowing the long-ruling Emperor Haile Selassie I in 1974. The Derg (meaning "committee" or "council") and its leaders were known for dramatically restructuring the country's political and economic institutions, often through the use of suppression and fear, while transforming the central government's role in domestic affairs. Programs such as the extensive villagization schemes carried out in various parts of the country further served as a testament to the regime's commitment to radical reform measures.

Once in power, the leaders of the PDRE continued pursuing their aims as former Derg leaders, such as by resuming forced resettlement programs that were deemed nonviable by many and were ultimately met with a considerable amount of international criticism. Scholars have noted that the fall of the PDRE was largely made possible by the loss of both financial and military support from the dwindling Soviet Union, which had previously backed the Derg following their seizure of power in 1974. The EPRDF capitalized on the mismanaged PDRE's weakening state and general unpopularity when rebel forces officially seized power from the PRDE in May 1991.

Soon after the EPRDF secured the nation's capital, a "National Conference on Peace and Reconciliation" was called in Addis Ababa. Held in July 1991, the conference was intended to outline a transitional framework for the period following the newest regime change. Some notable ethnicity-based political movements that were present include the Oromo Liberation Front, the Afar Liberation Front, and the Western Somali Liberation Front. Any political organizations that wanted to attend was required to be centered around ethnic identity; thus, several organizations were quickly created for that purpose, resulting in the rapid development of urban elite-led ethnicity-based movements. Any person or political organization that had been associated with Mengistu Haile Mariam's Workers' Party of Ethiopia was also not permitted to attend.

== Transitional charter ==
The 1991 conference ultimately resulted in the adoption of the "Transitional Period Charter of Ethiopia" and the official establishment of a transitional government. Much to the relief of the international community, the conference attendees agreed on major transformations of the country's political and economic systems that would usher in liberal institutions that were purportedly intended to guarantee fair representation, encourage plurality, and demand transparency at the executive level.

This and other key initiatives of the TGE were outlined in the Transitional Period Charter of Ethiopia, which was divided into five parts:

=== Part I: Democratic Rights ===
Explicitly drawing from the United Nations' Universal Declaration of Human Rights, Article One of the Charter declares that every individual is entitled to the following:

"a. The freedom of conscience, expression, association, and peaceable assembly; b. The right to engage in unrestricted political activity and to organize political parties, provided the exercise of such right does not infringe upon the rights of others."

Article Two concerns the rights of "nations, nationalities, and peoples" in Ethiopia, referring to the various ethnolinguistic groups in the country. Not only does the Charter protect nationalities' right to exercise their autonomy, but it also allows them to secede ("self-determination of independence") if they so wish.

=== Part II: Principles guiding foreign policy ===
This section briefly affirms the TGE's authority to "abide by all mutual agreements that respect the sovereignty of Ethiopia and are not contrary to the interests of the People." In addition, it grants subnational governments the right to form their own relationships with foreign organizations if it is for the purpose of humanitarian or relief efforts.

=== Part III: Structure and Composition of the Transitional Government ===
This section outlines the structure of the Transitional Government, starting with the establishment of a Council of Representatives, which "shall be composed of representatives of national liberation movements, other political organizations and prominent individuals, to make-up a total of no more than 87 members." The Council of Representatives was also responsible for supporting the work of the unelected Council of Ministers, which primarily consisted of members selected by the heads of state (president, prime minister, etc.).

=== Part IV: Transitional programme ===
Part IV provides a general outline of the remaining actions to be taken during the transitional period. It assigns the Council of Representatives with the responsibility to oversee the creation of a draft constitution that would eventually be presented to the Constituent Assembly before being formally adopted. Article twelve briefly mandates that elections for a National Assembly, must be held within the following two years; the Transitional Government was expected to hand over power to the parties who make up a majority of the Assembly.

The second section of Part IV expresses the Transitional Government's commitment to relief efforts supporting those whose lives had been severely impacted by armed conflict, violence on behalf of the previous regime, and to "the rehabilitation of those forcibly [sic] uprooted by the previous regime's policy of villagisation and resettlement." Article Seventeen makes an additional reference to the state of inter-ethnic relations in the country"

"[The Transitional Government] shall make special efforts to dispel ethnic mistrust and eradicate the ethnic hatred that have been fostered by the previous regimes."

=== Part V: Legality of the charter ===
Part V proclaims the Charter's authority as "the supreme law of the land for the duration of the transitional period," effective 22 July 1991.

== Leadership ==
The Ethiopian People's Revolutionary Democratic Front (EPRDF) was a coalition of various ethnically-based political movement created by the Tigray People's Liberation Front (TPLF), a guerrilla movement formed in the contemporary Tigray region of northern Ethiopia in 1975. The TPLF was at the core of the EPRDF, although other political movements in the coalition included the Ethiopian People's Democratic Movement (which later became the Amhara National Democratic Movement, representing those from what is now known as the Amhara region of the country) and the Oromo People's Democratic Organisation (OPDO), representing those from the Oromia region of Ethiopia.

1992 marked the first elections of the transitional period, which were held to select representatives for 14 new regional assemblies. The main political movements competing for power were the EPRDF, the All Amhara People's Organisation, and the Oromo Liberation Front (OLF). During the campaign cycle, various opposition movements (including the OLF) publicly withdrew from the races, complaining that the threats and intimidation tactics allegedly used by the EPRDF would make it impossible for the elections to be free and fair.

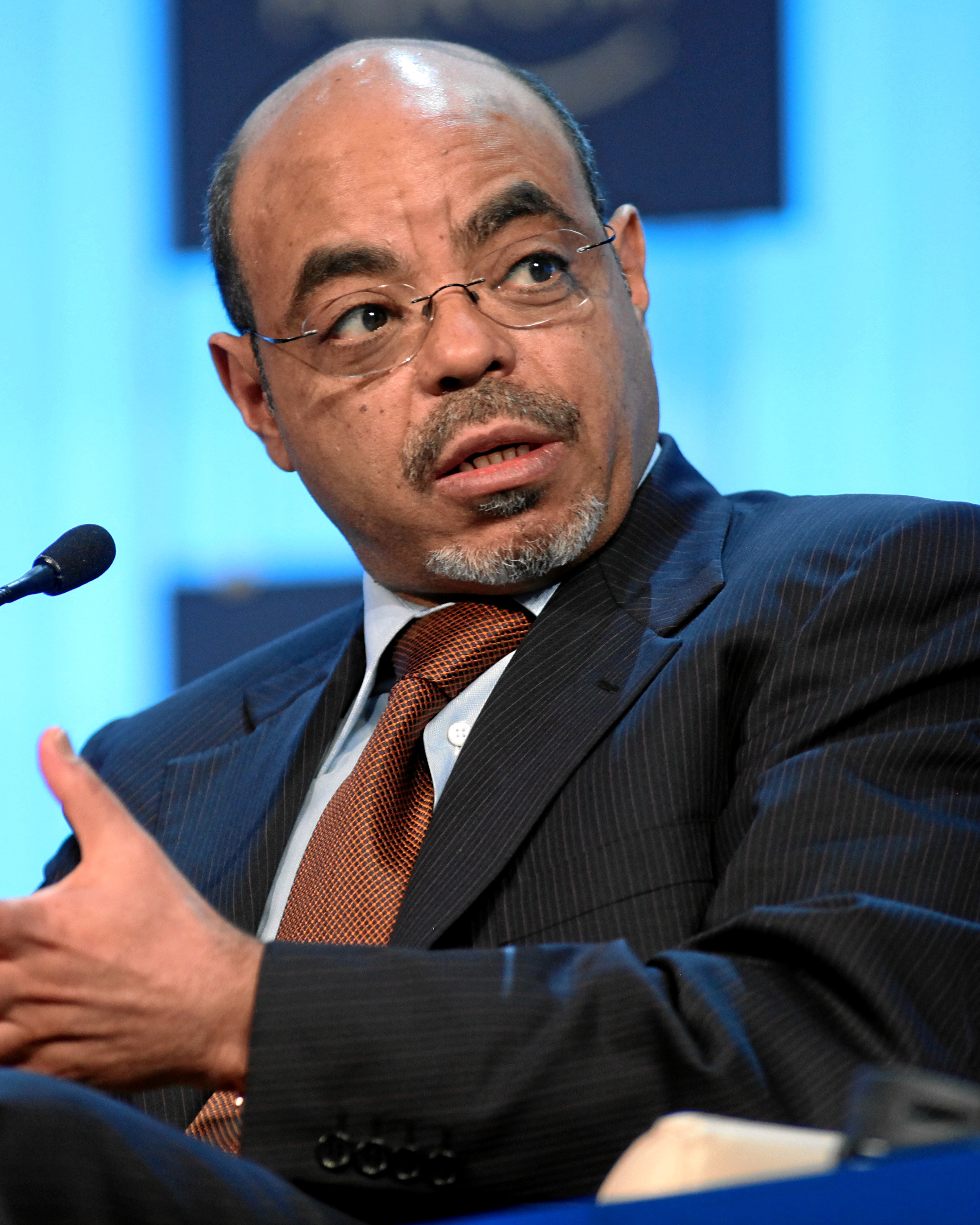
Meles Zenawi in 2012

The potential for the EPRDF to assume total power in the Transitional Government was suspected by many from the beginning. At the 1991 National Conference on Peace and Reconciliation, one foreign onlooker commented that "[although the 1991 conference may not have resulted in a one party government[,] its convention reflects to a large degree a one party dynamic." The terms of the resulting charter were likewise mainly drawn from the key ideals of the EPRDF (particularly those of the TPLF). In addition, the president of the TGE was Meles Zenawi, chairman of the TPLF; his colleague, fellow EPRDF leader Tamrat Layne, became the prime minister. Thirty-two of the eighty-seven seats in the Council of Representatives were filled by EPRDF members as well. The TGE also took steps to cleanse the government of any traces of the previous regime, such as removing and replacing the occupants of almost all senior government posts, reorganizing all state agencies and institutions, and disbanding the Derg's large military force.

== Ethnic federalism ==
One of the most dramatic political changes overseen by the Transitional Government was the realignment of provincial boundaries on the basis of ethnolinguistic identity. This marked the beginning of Ethiopia's first federal administrative structure, made up of nine regional states (singular: ክልል kilil; plural: kililoch). Article Two of the Transitional Period Charter of Ethiopia formally proclaims the rights of ethnic groups within the country, which are officially referred to as nations or nationalities:

"The right of nations, nationalities and peoples to self-determination is affirmed. to this end, each nation, nationality and people is guaranteed the right to:

a./ Preserve its identity and have it respected, promote its culture and history and use and develop its language;

b./ Administer its own affairs within its own defined territory and effectively participate in the central government on the basis of freedom, and fair and proper representation;

c./ Exercise its right to self determination of independence, when the concerned, nation/nationality and people is convinced that the above rights are denied, abridged or abrogated."

As such, one of the TGE's main aims was to establish a devolution of political power down to ethnic divisions, arguing that it was an essential move if the country wanted to lessen conflicts across ethnic lines, ensure a fairer distribution of resources across the country, and increase efficiency within the public sector. By 1994, the ethnically-based regions of Afar, Tigray, Somali, Amhara, Benishangul-Gumuz, Oromia, Harari, Gambela, and the Southern Nations, Nationalities, and Peoples Region (SNNPR), a diverse region inhabited by at least 40 different ethnic groups, were formally established. Addis Ababa, defined as a federal district, and later Dire Dawa were declared to be ethnically diverse chartered cities.

Contemporary political boundaries of Ethiopia

It is commonly suggested by scholars that the EPRDF's decision to establish a federal administrative structure along ethnic lines was a move towards reinforcing its political dominance. By dividing the country and facilitating the creation of accompanying ethnically-based parties under the government's control, the TPLF (which represented less than 10% of the country's population) could intensify its hold on power. Dissatisfied opposition parties argued that this form of federalization was not appropriate for the country. For instance, the All Amhara People's Organisation (AAPO) and the Ethiopian Democratic Union Party expressed in 2000 that they preferred a strong unitary state with representation of the country's nationalities at the core. Other groups, such as the Oromo National Congress (ONC) and the Ethiopia Democratic Party (EDP), were not opposed to the idea of establishing a federal system, arguing that it set the foundation for regional autonomy, but believed that it was a mistake for it to conducted along ethnic lines.

== Human rights abuses ==
Throughout the transitional period, the Transitional Government of Ethiopia was criticized by various human rights organizations for abuses ranging from extrajudicial executions to unlawful detentions. At the establishment of the TGE in 1991, when the EPRDF first took power, human rights organizations such as Human Rights Watch and Amnesty International expressed optimism about the future of the state of human rights in Ethiopia. During the previous regime under Mengistu, human rights groups could not exist; following May 1991, however, human rights watchdogs such as the Ethiopian Human Rights Council, the Ethiopian Congress for Democrats, and the human rights committee of the Committee of Eleven were established. However, hopes were quickly dashed following a pattern of rights violations aimed at political dissidents across the country.

For instance, at least ten demonstrators in Addis Ababa were killed while protesting the EPRDF in their early days of power. In addition, an estimated 5,000-100,000+ members (including jailed former soldiers) of the previous PDRE were swiftly imprisoned under the TGE. While some were later released, many others were held without being officially charged or having a trial. Members of Mengistu's Workers' Party of Ethiopia were also not permitted to travel abroad or go back to work if they were previously detained by the EPRDF for the duration of the year, but generally found themselves able to do so in 1992. From May 1991 to the end of the year, the EPRDF is suspected to have committed dozens of summary executions despite the government's lack of information surrounding state-sanctioned executions.

The 1992 elections for 14 new regional assemblies were widely criticized by international observers who asserted that instances of fraud and the arrests of opposition leaders rendered the elections' results, which overwhelmingly favored the EPRDF, meaningless. For instance, in many cases, candidates representing the All-Amhara People's Organization were prevented from registering themselves in various constituencies. Similarly, candidates representing the Oromo Liberation Front (OLF) were threatened, harassed, and detained by the EPRDF. Despite a law that lifted nearly all of the censorship restrictions enacted by the PDRE, much of the media was still controlled by the government and many journalists were still reluctant to risk challenging the TGE or raising awareness of the regime's abuses.

Later, the TGE created a Special Prosecutor's Office to begin investigating government personnel associated with the previous regime or Mengistu's Worker's Party of Ethiopia, deciding to formally suspend habeas corpus from August 1992 to the end of the year. By the end of the year, however, none of the detainees had been charged with any crimes. Nearly 20,000 suspected armed OLF members, some of which were believed to be unarmed civilians (including children) were forcibly held in military camps in three different regions for the purpose of disarming and "re-educat[ing]" them, although very few had been released by the end of 1992. Throughout this time, the country's judiciary had failed to adequately adjudicate cases or to hold the TGE and its forces accountable for rights abuses. This was largely due to disruptions such as the looming threat of a possible suspension of all judges who were associated with the former Workers' Party of Ethiopia, the abrupt resignation of the Minister of Justice, a lack of an operating police force.

These types of abuses persisted throughout the remainder of the transitional period. Freedom of the press was limited; in the first half of 1994, at least twenty journalists were fined or jailed as a result of publishing content that challenged the government, a situation exacerbated by the fact that the contemporary press laws were vague and improperly implemented. Human rights organizations including the Ethiopian Human Rights Council were denied formal registration from the government but continued to process complaints and report abuses; the government accused EHRCO of being a politically-motivated group with a hidden agenda that favored opposition groups and reported false information. Individuals suspected to have been previously associated with the OLF were treated particularly harshly once they were detained in secret detention centers across the country. In areas ranging from the Hararghe region in eastern Ethiopia to the Wollega region in the west, detainees reported experiencing beatings, food deprivation, death threats, and rape as a result of being suspected to be sympathetic with the OLF's cause. Government forces also continued to employ lethal force during confrontations with demonstrators until the end of the TGE's hold on power, with numerous civilians killed by police at demonstrations and student protests.

== See also ==
- Ethnic federalism
- Eritrean War of Independence
- Meles Zenawi
- Mengistu Haile Mariam
- People's Democratic Republic of Ethiopia
