= Workers' Party of Ethiopia =

Marxist-Leninist party in Ethiopia (1984–1991)

Workers' Party of Ethiopia የኢትዮጵያ ሠራተኞች ፓርቲ
- General Secretary: Mengistu Haile Mariam
- Founded: 12 September 1984
- Dissolved: 21 May 1991
- Preceded by: COPWE
- Headquarters: Addis Ababa
- Newspaper: Serto Ader
- Ideology: Communism; Marxism–Leninism; Socialist patriotism; Ethiopian nationalism; Ethno-nationalism; Pan-Africanism
- Political position: Far-left
- National Shengo (1987): 795 / 835 (95%)

Party flag

The Workers' Party of Ethiopia (Amharic: የኢትዮጵያ ሠራተኞች ፓርቲ, romanized: Ye'Ityopia Serategnoch Parti, WPE) was a Marxist–Leninist communist party in Ethiopia from 1984 to 1991 led by General Secretary Mengistu Haile Mariam. The Workers' Party of Ethiopia was founded in 1984 by the Derg, the ruling provisional government of Ethiopia, as the vanguard party for a planned future socialist state. In 1987, the WPE became the ruling party after the establishment of the People's Democratic Republic of Ethiopia, and the only legal political party until it was disbanded in 1991. A party was attempted to be formed with the same name in August 2022, but the application was rejected.

== History ==
=== COPWE ===
In 1974, the Derg, a committee of low-ranking officers and enlisted men in the Ethiopian Army, overthrew Emperor Haile Selassie and the government of the Ethiopian Empire during the mass discontent in the country at the time. Originally a non-ideological representative committee for the military, the Derg became the de facto government of Ethiopia in the form of a military junta, and the following year it formally abolished the monarchy and declared itself socialist. The Derg received backing from the Soviet Union, who soon afterwards began to pressure them to create a civilian-based vanguard party, and styled themselves as a provisional government under the name Provisional Military Government of Socialist Ethiopia. Mengistu Haile Mariam became Chairman of the Derg in 1977 and argued against such a party, stating that the revolution had succeeded without one and that there was no need. However, by the late 1970s, the Derg faced increasing armed opposition to their rule, and it became apparent that a civilian party would be required to gain any measure of control over the population.

In December 1979, Mengistu formed the Commission for Organizing the Party of the Working People of Ethiopia (COPWE), a temporary political organization that served as a vanguard party for Ethiopia until a permanent one was created. A number of other pre-party mass organisations were also established, such as the Revolutionary Ethiopia Youth Association, hoping that these organisations would help lead to a unified party that would eliminate sectarianism and be based on broad yet clearly defined class interests. The organisations were also intended to act as a conduit for political consciousness at a more personal level by representing Ethiopians at congresses, in the workplace, and at educational institutes, and membership in multiple of the mass organizations was encouraged. The COPWE held three congresses for the mass organisations it had set up, and despite the best efforts of the government to encourage diversity, more than one third of those present at the first congress in 1980 were either soldiers or Addis Ababa residents. The 1980 congress unveiled the membership of the COPWE's Central Committee and Secretariat. The Secretariat, which controlled the more day to day aspects of the Central Committee's business and was supervised by the top Derg leadership, was composed of mainly civilian ideologues. Regional branches of the Secretariat coordinated by army officers helped complement the COPWE's central leadership. The organisation became more powerful in 1981 with the creation of separate offices for administrator and COPWE representatives in each region. By 1983, there were about 50,000 COPWE members and approximately 6,500 party cells.

Mengistu's earlier calls for ideological purity and "committed communists" soon became a simple façade for the Derg's efforts to eliminate its political opponents regardless of actual beliefs. Loyalty to the Derg was preferred over dedication to Marxism-Leninism or certain ideological ideals in considerations for party membership. By this time, the military and police had also become the majority in the membership of the Central Committee, with 79 of its 123 members being soldiers, twenty of whom were also Derg members.

=== Formation ===
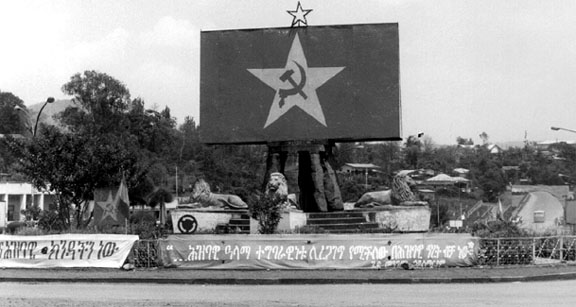
A Workers' Party of Ethiopia monument extolling the virtues of communism.

The Workers' Party of Ethiopia (WPE) was finally established on 12 September 1984, to mark the tenth anniversary of the revolution in which the Derg came to power, replacing the COPWE which was dissolved. Mengistu became the party leader under the title general secretary. The WPE's Politburo replaced the COPWE's executive committee as Ethiopia's chief decision-making body, featuring eleven members: seven were the surviving members of the Derg (including Mengistu), while the other four were civilian ideologues and technocrats. The Central Committee was expanded to 183 members, with party congresses every five years. Generally, Mengistu's wishes prevailed over any opposition, and the nepotism involved in the selection of Politburo members meant that opposition was usually marginal anyway, leading the entire council to serve more as a mouthpiece for Mengistu's wishes than as a legitimate government body. At a national level, membership of the WPE was heavily slanted towards soldiers and members of certain ethnic groups that had, historically, endorsed the concept of a unified "Greater Ethiopia", such as the Tigray and Amhara. However, at regional and local levels, ethnicity and military service became less relevant, with large numbers of civilians and members of various ethnicities in positions of power.

The adoption of the 1987 Constitution of Ethiopia established the WPE as the official ruling party of Ethiopia, dissolving the Derg and renamed the country the People's Democratic Republic of Ethiopia. The WPE's position as "formulator of the country's development process and the leading force of the state and in society" was enshrined into law by the 1987 constitution, and as in most communist countries, the constitution gave the party more political power than the government itself, with local party leaders given almost free rein provided their policies did not conflict with the party's Central Committee.

=== Demise ===
By the time the WPE came to power in the late-1980s, Ethiopia had been ravaged by droughts and the Derg's mismanagement of the country, and the world's communist movement was declining. By the turn of the 1990s, the WPE's power began to unravel amidst the end of Soviet support in 1990, a concurrent move towards multi-party politics across Africa, and increasing armed insurrection during the Ethiopian Civil War. Mengistu then fled the country, fleeing one week before rebels defeated the government and took power in Ethiopia in 1991. The WPE was dissolved in May 1991, by the new Transitional Government of Ethiopia, and most of its leaders were imprisoned for alleged crimes they had committed in their positions during the party's rule.

== Electoral history ==
=== National Shengo ===
| Election year | Number of seats |
|---|---|
| 1987 | 795 / 835 |

== List ==
| | Portrait | Name (Birth–Death) | Term of office | | Party (Coalition) |
| N | Portrait | Name (Birth–Death) | Took office | Left office | Party (Coalition) |
|---|---|---|---|---|---|
| 1 | | Mengistu Haile Mariam | 12 September 1984 | 21 May 1991 | Workers' Party of Ethiopia |

== See also ==
- Blanquism
