= Police academies by country =

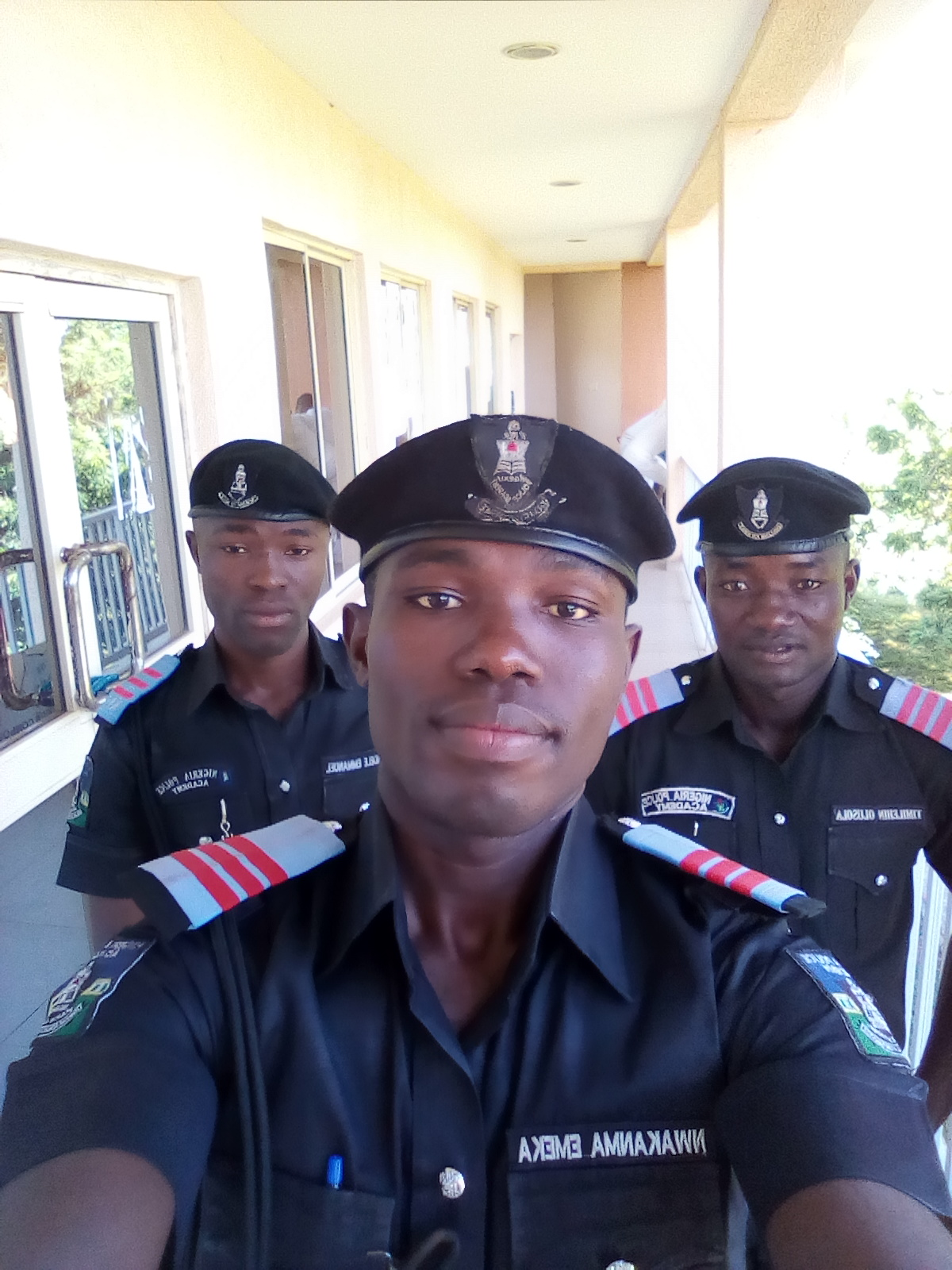
Cadets of the Nigerian Police Force Academy

Police academies worldwide serve as institutions for preparing cadets to uphold law and order, but the standards and training methods vary significantly depending on the academy.

== List of academies by country ==
=== Albania ===
Albanian Police recruits are trained at the Security Academy, located in Tirana.

=== Australia ===
In Australia, the states and mainland territories run a centralised academy for the training of law enforcement personnel for agencies within a given state or territory.

The academies ensure that officers meet basic local, state and federal standards. Graduation from an approved academy program is usually required before a new law enforcement officer is placed on active duty.

The New South Wales Police Academy, Victoria Police Academy, Queensland Police Academy, Tasmania Police Academy, South Australia Police Academy, Northern Territory Police Academy, Western Australia Police Academy are state police, initial training institutions.

The smaller Australian Federal Police Academy located in Barton, Canberra trains AFP recruits.

=== Austria ===
There are 10 police academies for the Federal Police (German: Bundespolizei). The basic training for police officers in Austria takes 24 months.

=== Argentina ===
- University Institute of the Argentine Federal Police

=== Azerbaijan ===
In Azerbaijan, the Police Academy was established in 1921 by the People's Internal Affairs Commissariat of the Azerbaijan Republic and it continued to function in Baku until 1936 when the main building of the academy was moved to Mərdəkan (a district outside Baku).

In 1957, it became the Baku Private Secondary Police School of the Ministry of Internal Affairs. The graduates were granted legal diplomas. Initially, education spanned two years. From 1957 to 1961, the school trained personnel for Georgia, Dagestan, Kabardino-Balkaria, Altai, Irkutsk, Krasnodar, Kuybyshev, Novosibirsk, Kemerovo, Saratov, and other states within the USSR.

The main purpose of the academy is to educate students regarding the law as well as specialised training for employees of the Ministry of Internal Affairs.

All candidates are expected to pass an entry examination composed mostly of fitness requirements. A candidate who does not meet the physical fitness requirements, or fails assessments such as medical or MIA checks are considered to be disqualified from the competition. Applicants must be a citizen of Azerbaijan with no criminal record. The successful candidates graduate after studying for 5 years at the academy.

During the course of study, students of academy are provided with dormitories, uniforms, scholarships, and meals. Men and women are placed in separate dormitories on campus.

After graduation, the candidates are assigned police ranks and they are given positions within the Ministry of Internal Affairs. The academy studies other countries by sending officers to Germany, Austria, England, Spain, Hungary, Poland, Russia, and other countries.

=== Bangladesh ===
In Bangladesh, the Bangladesh Police Academy trains recruits of the Bangladesh Police. It also offers refreshment training for previous graduates. Each law enforcement includes specialised training and study durations.

- Assistant Superintendent of Police (ASP): Bangladesh Police Academy (1 year), foundation training at Bangladesh Public Administration Training Center (BPATC)
- Sub-Inspector: Bangladesh Police Academy (1 year)
- Sergeant: Bangladesh Police Academy (6 months)
- Constable: Bangladesh Police Academy (6 months)

=== Bulgaria ===
The Bulgarian police academy is the Academy of the Ministry of Interior, in Sofia (Bulgarian: Академия МВР).

=== Brazil ===
- National Police Academy (ANP - Academia Nacional de Polícia)

=== Canada ===
Cadets of the Royal Canadian Mounted Police are trained at the RCMP Academy, Depot Division in Regina, Saskatchewan. After the recruitment process, successful candidates are scheduled to attend the Academy and begin the Cadet Training Program. Cadets are grouped together in what the force calls "troops". A troop consists of a maximum of 32 men and women who follow their entire 26-week training together. The number of trainees at Depot varies in relation to the demands of the force.

Cadet training is offered in either English only or in an English-French bilingual format, and is 26 weeks long. This is on top of an eight-month-long application process. Cadets are trained in use of firearms, defensive tactics, police driving, fitness, drill, applied police sciences and more. Cadets receive an allowance during their training of CA$525 per week in exchange for a commitment to becoming an RCMP officer for two years upon hiring. Once training ends, cadets are offered employment with the RCMP and awarded the status of peace officers. They must be willing to relocate to anywhere within Canada, even to remote areas of the country.

Many Canadian municipal and provincial police forces hire police officers who graduated from the RCMP Academy. No one can join the RCMP as a regular member without completing the RCMP Academy's 26-week program. Candidates who are graduates of a police training institution and have served a minimum of two years in a policing role with another Canadian police agency can undergo a five-week learning and orientation program rather than the full 26-week program.

In addition to training new RCMP regular members, Depot has also been a major continuing-education centre for police in Canada, but is currently tasked primarily with the training of new members and other training is conducted elsewhere. It delivers updated and highly specialized training to experienced RCMP officers and to members of other forces from around the world who want to improve their knowledge.

=== China ===
- Beijing People's Police College
- China People's Police University
- Criminal Investigation Police University of China
- National Police University for Criminal Justice
- People's Armed Police Special Police College
- People's Public Security University of China

==== Hong Kong ====
- Hong Kong Police College

==== Macau ====
- Academy of Public Security Forces

=== Colombia ===
National Police of Colombia recruits are trained at the General Santander National Police Academy.

=== Cyprus ===
The Cyprus Police Academy, (Greek: Αστυνομική Ακαδημία Κύπρου), is the main educational institution for law enforcement officers in the Republic of Cyprus. Founded in 1990 as the successor to the Police Training School, the CPA is recognised as an institution of higher education by the Cyprus Council for the Recognition of Higher Education Qualifications. The CPA operates under the Ministry of Justice and Public Order as a police unit within the organizational structure of the Cyprus Police. It functions on a permanent basis, both for the education of cadet constables and for the training of all police members, regardless of rank, as part of officers' continuing education. Some legal courses are also conducted for non-police officers.

=== Czech Republic ===
The Police Education and Training Unit (PETU) was established in 2015 and is the leading agency regarding all education and training of the police forces in the Czech Republic. In the Czech Republic, the Police Academy is a university-level institution, where specialised training for police, public administration, and private security services is provided. Some branches are open to civilians while some are only for police officers and other para-military groups such as firefighters and soldiers. The schools are open to recruits holding advanced educational degrees (bachelor's degree or higher).

Basic training centers for recruits are called "secondary police schools" and every law enforcement officer must advance through one of these centers. In this system, "senior police schools" still exist that have the educational status of "higher learning", where specializations are offered.

Municipal police may have access to several training centers, and some larger cities have their own dedicated campuses. Some municipalities conduct training through privately licensed agencies.

=== Estonia ===
The Estonian Police was originally established in 1918 and then re-established in 1991 after gaining independence from the Soviet Union. The Estonia Police force consists of three units: Central Criminal Police, the Central Law Enforcement, and the Forensic Service Center. In Estonia, the Estonian Academy of Security Science is located in Tallinn and consists of four colleges including the Police and Border Guard colleges in Muraste and Paikuse. Estonia Police were the first to use Blockchain technology to allow for better policing of the people. Applicants must be in good health, have no criminal background and possess certain traits as evaluated by psychological exams.

=== Ethiopia ===
- Ethiopian Police University College

=== Finland ===
Recruits in the Finnish Police forces receive training at the Police University College in Finland, or POLAMK. It is located in Tampere, Finland and consists of various teaching facilities and related premises, including a vehicle training facility and a training area for live-action, realistic police operations. POLAMK requires its candidates to be Finnish citizens who have completed at least a vocational qualification, upper secondary school studies or the matriculation examination. Applicants must be in good health, have no criminal background and possess certain traits as evaluated by psychological exams. The Security Intelligence Service performs a basic security background check of all applicants which includes penalties and convictions, arrests for drunkenness, racist attitudes as well as security risks. Applicants must possess, at least, a short-term driving license by the end of the application period. Basic police training requires three years of study and is considered a bachelor's degree.

After the bachelor's degree and three additional years of experience in the field of internal security, an officer is qualified to apply for Master's studies (2 years, Master's degree). Master's studies focus on management skills and supervisory tasks. The master's degree is a required qualification for command positions such as Chief Inspector or Superintendent.

=== France ===
Entry-level police officers train at National Police Schools (French: Écoles nationales de police, ENP) located in Draveil, Reims, Roubaix and Périgueux for twelve months. Programs cover criminal law, intervention techniques, and physical training. Internships that allow for operational practice are also available. Prospective cadets must have a high school diploma.

Cadets training for an intermediate career (between police officer and commissioner) train at the National Superior School for Police Officers (French: École nationale supérieure des officiers de police, ENSOP) for eighteen months. Cadets must have a bachelor's degree and undergo twelve months of training at an ENP.

The Central Directorate for Recruitment and Training of the National Police oversees both initial and ongoing training across France. The Higher National Police Academy (French: École nationale supérieure de la police, ENSP) operates campuses in Saint-Cyr-au-Mont-d'Or and Cannes-Écluse and is designed for future police commissioners and officers. It provides education for high-ranking officials, academic training, and preparation for competitive exams and partnerships with universities. Commissioner cadets are required to have a master's degree and undergo two years of training at an ENSP.

National police training centers offer continuing education in areas including cybercrime and forensic science.

There are competitive exams for different roles in French police academies.

=== Germany ===
In Germany policing is divided into different levels. There are different police academies (German: Polizeischule) for the federal police (German: Bundespolizei) or state police forces (German: Landespolizei). In addition, there are training centers for several municipal police forces as well.

=== Georgia ===
- Academy of the Ministry of Internal Affairs of Georgia

=== Ghana ===
Ghana Police Service recruits are trained at the Ghana Police Academy in Tesano.

=== Honduras ===
Officers of the National Police of Honduras train at the General José Trinidad Cabañas National Police Academy of Honduras.

=== Indonesia ===
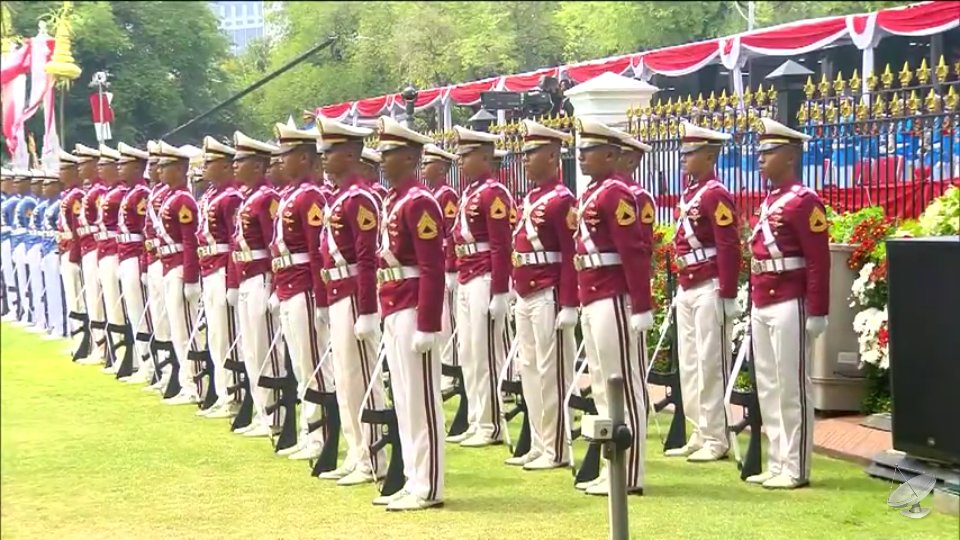
Indonesian Police Academy cadets

In Indonesia, the National Police Academy (Indonesian: Akademi Kepolisian, AKPOL) is the main institute, training center, and school for recruits joining the Indonesian National Police to become professional officers. After 4 years in the Police Academy, cadets graduate to the rank of Police Inspector 2nd Class (Indonesian: Inspektur Polisi Dua), (equivalent to Second Lieutenant in the military). Graduates become first line supervisors with the rank of junior first ranking officers in the Indonesian National Police and can be deployed to different units within the force. The academy is located in Semarang, Central Java and is part of the International Association of Police Academies.

Cadet ranks in the academy are as shown below:

- Cadet Enlisted Candidate (Calon Bhayangkara Taruna) – Trainee for the first 4 months
- Cadet Enlisted Second Class (Bhayangkara Dua Taruna) – First Year
- Cadet Enlisted First Class (Bhayangkara Satu Taruna) – Second Year
- Cadet Brigadier Second Class (Brigadir Dua Taruna) – Third Year
- Cadet Brigadier First Class (Brigadir Satu Taruna) – Fourth Year
- Cadet Brigadier (Brigadir Taruna) – Graduating year (After this rank, they will graduate and achieve the rank of Police Inspector)

Until 1999, before the Indonesian National Police officially separated from the armed forces (ABRI), the Indonesian Police Academy also stood under the National Armed Forces Academy but now has separated from the Military and is under the auspices of the President of Indonesia, and controlled by the National Police Headquarters (Mabes Polri). Although separated from the service academies, cadets from both institutions maintain cooperative relationships through annual joint exercises. AKPOL's new cadets and fourth class cadets, alongside their armed forces counterparts, have had a joint fourth class cadet training program since 2008, after completing it the police officer cadets spend the remaining four years of study in Semarang.

=== India ===
Located in Hyderabad, India, Sardar Vallabhbhai Patel National Police Academy (SVPNPA) is the national institute for training of Indian Police Service (IPS) officers before they are assigned to their respective Indian state cadres. Additionally, each state has their respective police academy for training of lower ranks below the rank of superintendent of police, such as constable, sub-inspector and many more.

State police academies:

- Telangana State Police Academy
- Kerala Police Academy
- Swami Vivekananda State Police Academy, West Bengal
- Maharashtra Intelligence Academy

Central armed police academies:

- National Industrial Security Academy - CISF's training institute.
- CRPF Academy

=== Iran ===
Recruits of the Law Enforcement Command of Islamic Republic of Iran are trained at the Amin Police Academy in Tehran.

=== Ireland ===
In Ireland, the Garda Síochána College in Templemore is the only police academy. All trainees for the Garda Síochána and Garda Síochána Reserve study here. The basic training program is 104 weeks in the academy which is split with practical skills and training also required.

=== Israel ===
All Israel Police regular personnel are trained at the National Police Academy in Beit Shemesh, which has facilities for a wide range of training programs. Israel Border Police personnel are trained at the Border Police instructional base near Beit Horon and the basic training base near Ma'ale Mikhmas.

=== Italy ===
For prospective candidates to the Polizia di Stato, basic education is conducted at the Scuola Superiore di Polizia while the Scuola di perfezionamento per le Forze di Polizia conducts advanced education and implements courses on new legislation, regulations and operational techniques.

=== Japan ===
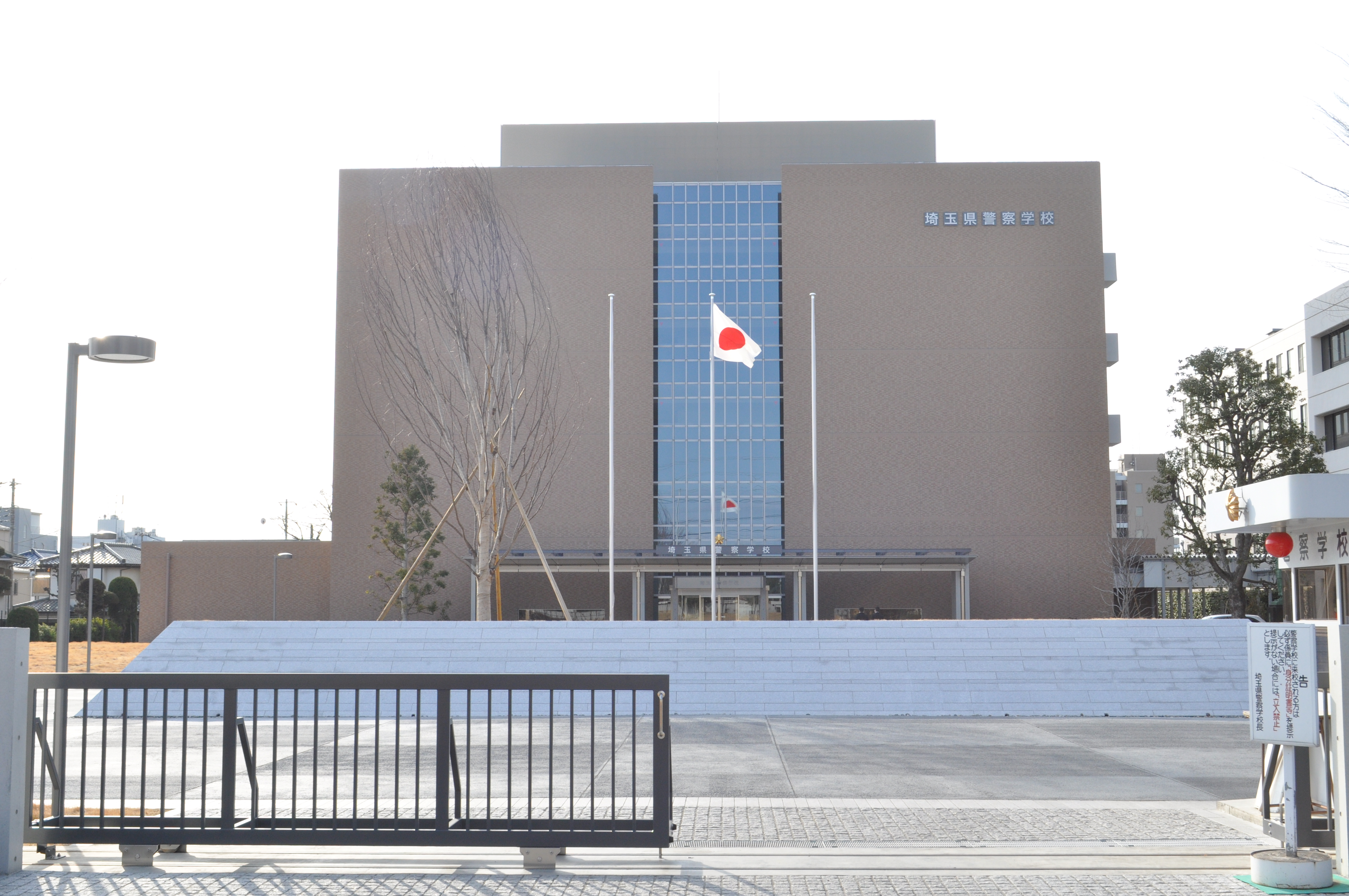
Saitama Prefectural Police academy

Each prefectural police department in Japan has a dedicated prefectural police academy. The police academy of the Tokyo Metropolitan Police Department is the Metropolitan Police Academy. The academies operate similarly to regular colleges or universities, and offer clubs and mandatory dormitories.

=== Malaysia ===
In Malaysia, there are fifteen police academies, one of them being the Royal Malaysia Police College in Kuala Lumpur which is a combination of four police training institutes, (the Kuala Kubu Baru Police College, the Special Branch Training School, the College of Criminal Investigation, and Traffic School), which train higher-ranking officers. The college has plans to be upgraded to a Police University in collaboration with the Sultan Idris Education University.

=== Moldova ===
The Ștefan cel Mare Academy of the Ministry of Internal Affairs primarily trains personnel of the General Police Inspectorate in their future service as law enforcement officers. Outside of the IGP, it also trains personnel from other law enforcement agencies under the Ministry of Internal Affairs. It is located in Moldova's capital, Chișinău.

=== Mongolia ===
- University of Internal Affairs of Mongolia

=== Nepal ===
- National Police Academy, Nepal

=== New Zealand ===
Located in Papakowhai, approximately 2 km north of Porirua City, the Royal New Zealand Police College is the central training institution for all police recruits and police officers in New Zealand.

=== Nigeria ===
Cadets for the Nigerian Police Force who join during recruitment drives are trained in a number of police colleges and training schools, including specialized schools. In addition, the Nigeria Police Academy in Wudil, Kano State, is a federal university for police recruits. Those who earn a degree from the Nigeria Police Academy can join the police with the rank of Assistant Superintendent, though they may also use their degrees to integrate into multiple sectors of the economy.

=== Norway ===
The Norwegian Police University College offers education for the police force of Norway, including a three-year basic education program and a possible expansion that would offer a Master's degree.

=== Pakistan ===
- National Police Academy of Pakistan
- Elite Police Training School
- Punjab Police College Sihala

=== Philippines ===
During the 1980s, the Philippine National Police Academy in Cavite served as a school for selected enlisted personnel and civilians to join as Police/Fire Lieutenants in the defunct Integrated National Police. After the merging of the Philippine Constabulary and INP on January 1, 1991, it became the primary officer school for the new Philippine National Police, the Bureau of Fire Protection and the Bureau of Jail Management and Penology, all under the Department of the Interior and Local Government (DILG).

Philippine National Police Academy graduates are automatically appointed as Inspectors/Lieutenants in the Philippine National Police, Bureau of Fire Protection, or the Bureau of Jail Management and Penology according to their choice of public safety curriculum during their cadetship. This is under the supervision of the DILG and the Philippine Public Safety College.

=== Poland ===
The Polish Police Academy is located in the town of Szczytno. In the college officers are enrolled in academic studies and trained in modern policing techniques, weapons handling, and informatics. Police schools are in Piła, Słupsk, Katowice, and Legionowo. Border guard training centers are located in Kętrzyn, Koszalin, and Lubań.

=== Qatar ===
- Police College (Qatar)

=== Romania ===
Offering two levels of training for officers, (Bachelor's Degree (3 years) and Master's Degree, (2 years), The Romanian Police academy is located in Bucharest.

The Border Police School and Training Center is located in Oradea, Avram Iancu, the Coast Guard Center is in Constanța. Centers for Training Border Police Personnel are in Iași and Orșova.

=== Russia ===
- Barnaul Law Institute
- Moscow University of the Ministry of Internal Affairs of Russia
- Omsk Academy of the Ministry of Internal Affairs
- Oryol Law Institute
- Saint Petersburg University of the Ministry of Internal Affairs of Russia

=== Saudi Arabia ===
- King Fahd Security College

=== Serbia ===
In Serbia, future police officers are trained at the Basic Police Training Centre in Sremska Kamenica, the former Police High School. The training lasts for 1 year and is followed by a 6-month probation period at a Regional Police Department. The skills the recruits learn are for general jurisdiction police officers, and after they are employed, they may specialise in a line of work (traffic police, border police, special forces, etc.). There is also the Academy of Criminalistic and Police Studies, a higher education institution established as a legal successor of the Advanced School of Internal Affairs, formed in 1972; and Police Academy, formed in 1993.

=== Singapore ===
Recruits of the Singapore Police Force, Singapore Civil Defence Force, Central Narcotics Bureau, Singapore Prison Service, Immigration and Checkpoints Authority, and Internal Security Department, among other Singaporean law enforcement and internal security agencies, are trained at the Home Team Academy.

=== Slovenia ===
In Slovenia, the police academy conducts training programs, education, and training for the police and for external users. All candidates need to have a high-school education before attending. Candidates spend eighteen months in basic training in order to become a police officer, followed by a six-month evaluation period. Advanced police school courses last two years, and require one to have been a police officer for at least two years.

=== South Africa ===
- South Africa Police Service Academy

=== South Korea ===
Korean National Police recruits and cadets are trained at the Central Police Academy in Chungju and the Korean National Police University in Asan.

=== Spain ===
In Spain, there is a Ministry of the Interior's National Police centralised academy near Ávila. The Guardia Civil runs two centralised academies, one for enlisted guardias and sub-officers in Baeza and another one for commanding officers in two campuses at Aranjuez and El Escorial (Madrid). The autonomous Catalan and Basque police forces —the Mossos d'Esquadra and the Ertzaintza— also have their own academies in Mollet del Vallès and Arcaute. No candidates with a criminal record are accepted.

Candidates attend these centralised public academies after passing the police force's entry examination, this way recruits are already enlisted and will automatically become police officers if they don't fail the course or drop out. Recruits' training is tuition free and the candidates are paid a police cadet's wage as members of the force. Basic training ranges from 9 months for an entry-level officer of the Policía Nacional, Guardia Civil or a mosso, but realistically takes 18 months to two years including practicums and additional training. Local police forces including Madrid's or Barcelona's are often trained at these large public academies too. High-rank or highly specialised courses are longer and eventually lead to a college-like degree.

The Spanish police academies must not be confused with the many fee-paying private academies training potential candidates to pass the entry examination beforehand. While these private academies may be helpful, studying at them is not required and potential candidates are able to take the entrance examination without these courses.

=== Sweden ===
Since 2015, police training has been entirely outsourced by the Swedish Police Authority, and is carried out at five universities: Malmö, Borås Växjö, Umeå, and Södertörn. The training covers five terms, and the last two include six months of paid workplace practicum as a Police Trainee. Applicants must possess eligibility for higher education, the personal qualities deemed necessary for the profession and meet a number of the physical requirements relating to the job.

=== Taiwan ===
- Central Police University
- Taiwan Police College

=== Thailand ===
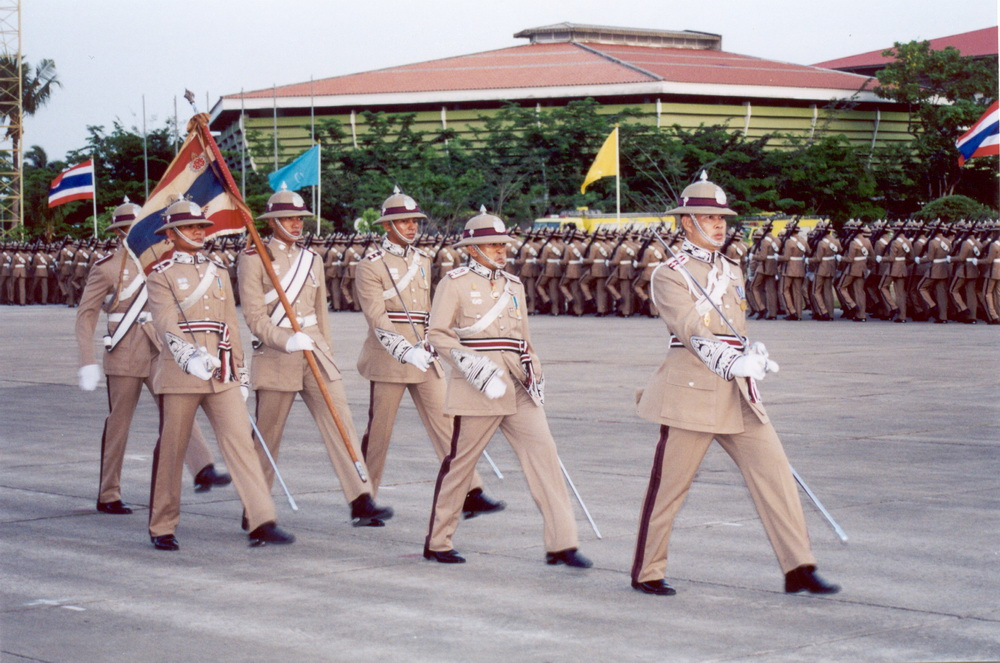
Thai Royal Police Cadet Academy cadets

In Thailand, the Royal Thai Police has two levels of police academies:

For police cadets, the Royal Police Cadet Academy is the only training center in the country. Graduates exit with the rank of sub-lieutenant.

Non-commissioned officers graduate from the Police Training Center for Non-Commissioned Officers with the rank of lance corporal. The training centers are divided according to operational regions, including the Central Police Training Division for the Metropolitan Police Bureau.

=== Turkey ===
The Turkish National Police Academy was established in 1937 to recruit police chiefs. In 1938, a police college, was established in Ankara in order to prepare students for the Police Academy. Today, the police academy recruits police officers in 26 schools located in different parts of Turkey, and police chiefs in one school located in Ankara.

=== Ukraine ===
National Police of Ukraine recruits are trained at the National Academy of Internal Affairs in Kyiv.

=== United Arab Emirates ===
In UAE, the Emirates either train their own police force or outsource training to academies of other Emirates. There are mainly two academies, one located in Abu Dhabi and the other in Dubai.

==== Abu Dhabi ====
In the Abu Dhabi Police Academy, the study program includes practical and field training. After successful completion of the program, the student is awarded a bachelor's degree in Law and Policing Sciences.

An Institute for officer training affiliated with the Police College was established in 1992. In 2002, the system of study in the college was changed to incorporate training theory programs and fieldwork.

The four years of study are divided into two levels of study consisting of eight terms:

===== Basic level – two years =====
One year for theoretical study and another for fieldwork.

===== Advanced level – two years =====
These two levels are preceded by an introductory period for the physical and psychological preparation of the students. After successful completion of the study and training programs, the student will be awarded a bachelor's degree in Police Sciences and Criminal Justice.

==== Dubai ====
The Dubai Police Academy was founded in 1987 and was granted autonomy from the police force as long as it retained some affiliation with Dubai Police General Headquarters. It was fully inaugurated in 1989 in the presence of Sheikh Maktoum Bin Rashid Al Maktoum. In 1992, degrees offered by the academy were given university equivalency.

The first class was from 1987 to 1988 and consisted of 51 cadets and 30 full-time students, (some of whom were existing police officers), which graduated in 1991. During the academic year of 1996–1997, students from other Arabic countries such as Yemen and the Palestinian Territories were admitted.

=== United Kingdom ===
==== England and Wales ====
All candidates for the 43 police forces for England and Wales must be over the age of 18 1/2; of a reasonable standard of physical fitness, with good health and eyesight. Candidates also must hold British citizenship, be a citizen of the Commonwealth with no restrictions on his or her stay within Britain or be a citizen of the Republic of Ireland. There are a number of entry routes, none of which require officers to train at a residential police academy. From 2007, all training was managed by the now defunct National Policing Improvement Agency with the College of Policing taking over in 2013.

==== Scotland ====
All new police officers in Scotland attend an initial 11-week training course at the Scottish Police College at Tulliallan Castle. The college has been operating since 1954 and hosts initial training of new officers as well as a range of courses such as the training of traffic officers and detectives. Many courses have received accreditation from the Scottish Qualifications Authority (SQA) or are credit rated on the Scottish Credit and Qualifications Framework (SCQF). Training ranges from a SCQF Level 7 for the probationer training delivered to new recruits (equivalent to an entry-level higher education course) to degree level qualifications for more specialised or senior roles such as detective training or courses for senior officers.

=== United States ===
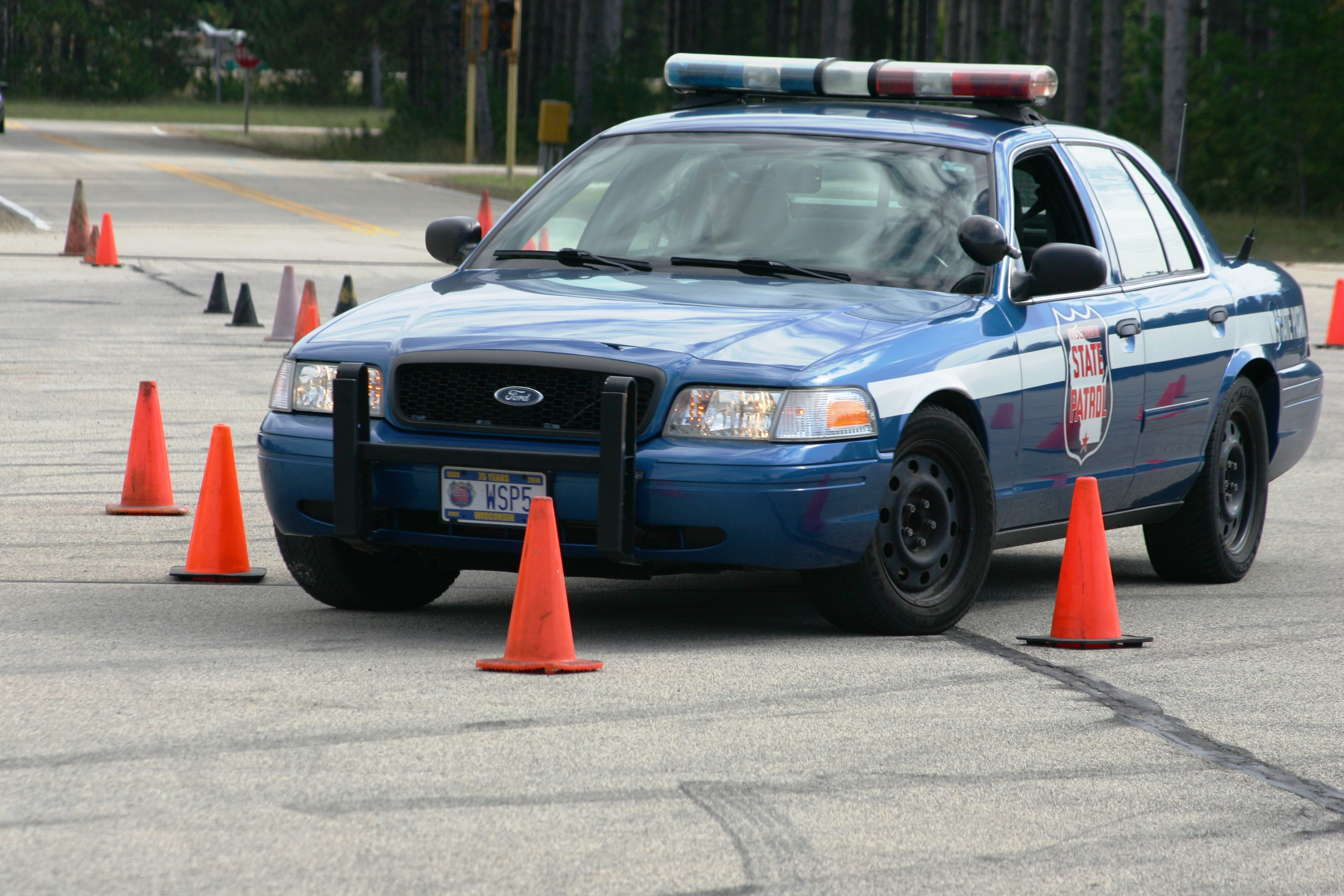
A Wisconsin State Patrol cadet driving a cruiser through an Emergency Vehicle Operations Course (EVOC) in 2014

Police academies exist in every state and at the federal level. Each state has an agency that certifies state-specific police academies and their programs. Most states have minimum physical and academic requirements to be completed prior to entry into the academy. Some states may require additional certifications before qualification as a police officer. While some states allow open enrollment in police academies, many require cadets to be hired by a police department in order to attend training. Departments and/or state certification agencies may also require individuals to pass background checks, psychological evaluations, polygraph exams, drug screenings, firearms qualifications and demonstrations of driving skills as prerequisites of employment/certification.

In an analysis of training requirements in several states by Gawker "found Louisiana law enforcement recruits typically attend 360 hours of training, while the national average is approximately 70% higher, at more than 600 hours. Louisiana requires less hours of training for law enforcement than the 1,500 hours needed to become a certified barber, the website said. "Washington, D.C., requires the most police academy training hours in the nation, at 1,120."

Researchers say police are given far more training on use of firearms than on de-escalating provocative situations.

==== Federal ====
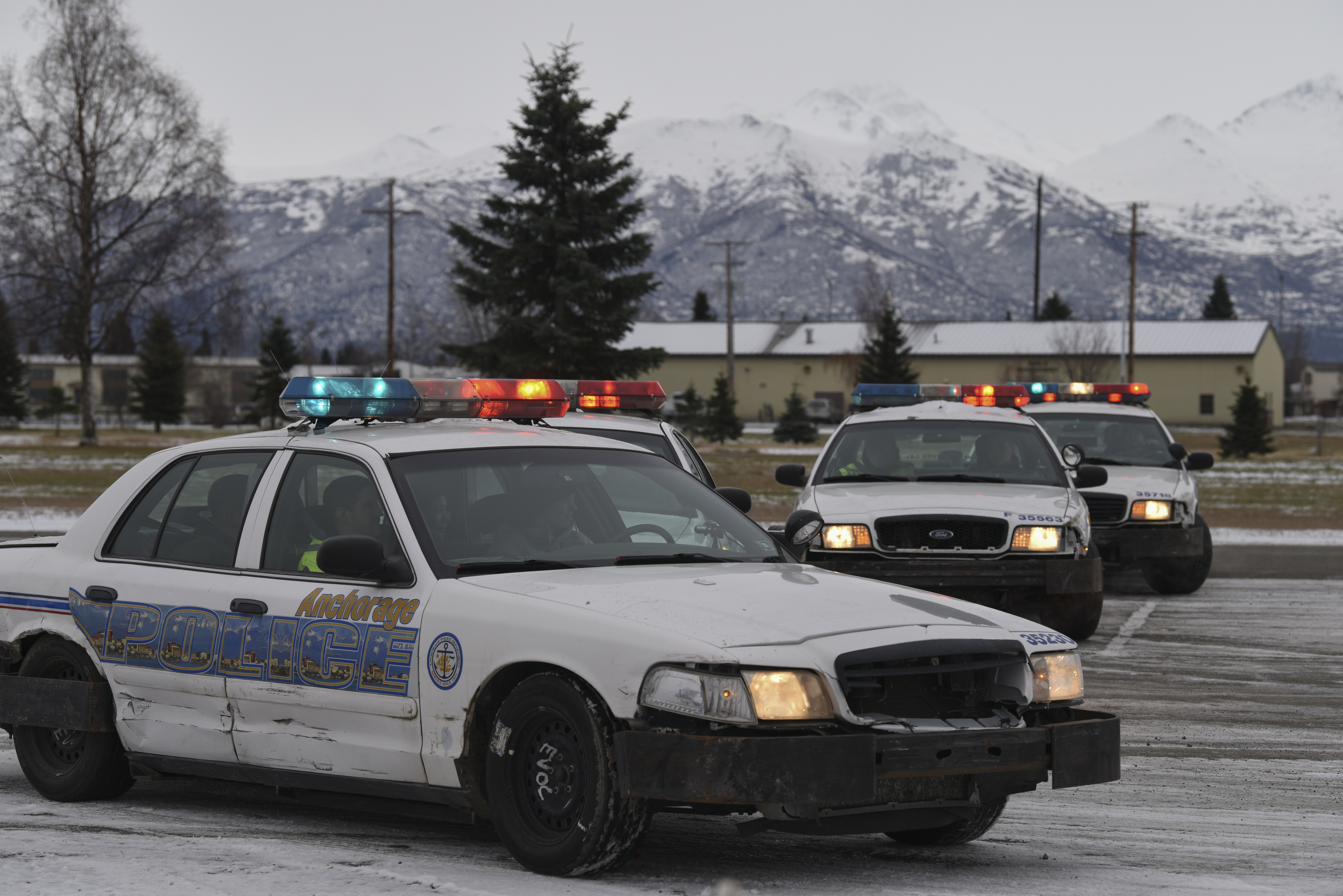
Anchorage Police Department Ford Crown Victoria Police Interceptors used for EVOC training at Joint Base Elmendorf-Richardson in 2018

While some federal law enforcement agencies have their own training requirements and training facilities, 91 federal law enforcement agencies (including the Federal Bureau of Investigation and United States Marshals Service), require agents, officers and prospective agents/officers to attend basic and in-service training at the Federal Law Enforcement Training Centers (FLETC). FLETC, which is operated by the Department of Homeland Security, and is headquartered in Glynco, Georgia with training sites in Artesia, New Mexico, Charleston, South Carolina and Cheltenham, Maryland.

==== Connecticut ====
In Connecticut, police officer recruits receive a certification to enforce the General Statutes. Their training is conducted at "The Connecticut Police Academy" located at 285 Preston Avenue, in Meriden, CT. In order to become a certified police officer, a recruit must be a legal United States resident at least 21 years of age, have a high school diploma or equivalent, possess a valid drivers license, and not be convicted of any felonies. The to be officers then have to attend an 818-hour basic training course that covers various aspects of police work. This basic training course is certified by Commission on Accreditation for Law Enforcement Agencies, (CALEA).

==== Florida ====
In Florida, police academies are primarily run by community colleges or state agencies. All law enforcement officers in the state are certified as such by a governing body appointed by the governor called the Criminal Justice Standards and Training Commission under the Florida Department of Law Enforcement. All applicants must pass a state examination and be hired by a law enforcement agency within 4 years of graduation to be considered certified.

==== Kentucky ====
All law enforcement officers in Kentucky, (except as listed below), hired after 1998 are required to complete the minimum screening, physical training and classroom requirements of the Kentucky's Police Officer Professional Standards (POPS) prior to being certified, and acting, as a law enforcement officer. Larger agencies, such as the Kentucky State Police, as well as the Louisville Metro Police and the Lexington Division of Police, operate their own police academies and may have requirements that exceed the minimum POPS standards. Agencies in Kentucky who do not run their own academies send their prospective officers to a 20-week basic training class at the Kentucky Department of Criminal Justice Training Academy, operated by the Kentucky Justice and Public Safety Cabinet and located on the campus of Eastern Kentucky University in Richmond. Exceptions to POPS training and certification are officers hired prior to 1998 and elected law enforcement officers whose duties and requirements are set forth in the Kentucky Constitution. These include sheriffs, constables, coroners and jailers, (though generally not deputies). Many of these officeholders, however, hold POPS certification from previous employment as law enforcement officers prior to their election and some will receive POPS certification or approved equivalent training before taking office.

==== Maryland ====
In Maryland, the Maryland Police and Correctional Training Commission is the civilian governing body that sets standards for law enforcement personnel within the state. Most major law enforcement agencies operate their own academy in which recruits must pass over 550 objectives including, (but not limited to), criminal and traffic law, officer safety techniques, defensive tactics, report writing, a 40-hour block of emergency vehicle operations, a 40-hour block of First Responder, and a 40-hour block of weapon training. Most agencies operate non-resident academies; however, the Maryland State Police requires recruits to live at the academy and, dependent on their performance level for the week, may leave campus for the weekend. Many colleges such as the University of Maryland and other community colleges offer police academy instruction as well.

==== Michigan ====
In Michigan, in order to become law enforcement officers, all applicants have the option to be certified by the Michigan Commission on Law Enforcement Standards or MCOLES. All persons wishing to become police officers in the State of Michigan must be certified through MCOLES. Cadets must pass a physical fitness exam as well as a reading and writing exam. Applicants also cannot have any felonies, weapons violations, or a history of domestic violence posted on their criminal records. Police academies are most often part of community colleges, city or county police and sheriff departments, or the Michigan State Police.

After the police academy, candidates take the MCOLES test. Upon successful completion, candidates are 'certifiable' and have a period of one year to obtain employment as law enforcement officers, (if not sponsored by an agency). If a candidate is unable to obtain a law enforcement position within that year, and if the candidate wishes to be considered in the future, he/she must attend a two-week re-certification course, which adds a year to the candidate's window of opportunity.

==== New Hampshire ====
New Hampshire's PSTC, (Police Standards and Training Council), provides all training and maintains certification standards for every full and part-time law enforcement officer in the state. This includes anyone who has the power of arrest, (except federal officers), under New Hampshire law. The PSTC also provides training and certification for correctional officers employed directly by the State. All recruits must have at least a conditional offer of employment from a law enforcement agency, have a clear background check, pass a medical exam and a physical fitness test. Agencies may add other qualifications such as education, polygraph, and drug exams. The PSTC law enforcement academies require each recruit to qualify with a firearm, demonstrate driving skills, maintaining physical fitness, pass subject matter exams and scenario evaluations as a condition of certification.

Most agencies in the state use a Field Training Officer program to provide additional training and evaluation of new hires.

==== Texas ====
The agency which certifies police academies in Texas is the Texas Commission on Law Enforcement (TCOLE). Many major cities and sheriff's offices also operate their own training academies, while some smaller municipalities cooperate to maintain regional academies. Some community colleges offer police training courses as well. There are three state-level law enforcement academies: the Texas Department of Public Safety which trains state troopers, the Texas Parks and Wildlife Department who train game wardens, and the Texas Department of Criminal Justice that trains state corrections officers. Police academies typically last from 18 to 30 weeks, though there are many variations. All police cadets are required to obtain at least a Basic Peace Officer Proficiency Certification from TCOLE before beginning active duty; some academies also require their cadets to obtain an Intermediate certification before graduating. TCOLE offers certifications for jailers and corrections officers, who must also undergo training prior to being commissioned, (albeit typically much less than police officers).

==== Utah ====
The basis of the Utah basic training for police officers is to protect the community and the citizens the officers are serving. They do this by completing basic training, firearms training, curriculum development, canine training, defensive tactics, emergency vehicle operations, and physical fitness training. Training for Utah officers is broken into two separate sections, called blocks. The two blocks are Special Functions and Law Enforcement. In order to be certified in the state of Utah an individual must successfully finish both blocks of training. This training is intended to teach the officers to be as professional and as up to date as possible. Officers are also required to do an additional 40 hours of training annually in order to stay up to date on all current laws and police procedures.

=== Venezuela ===
Venezuelan National Police recruits are trained at the Experimental Security University in Caracas.

=== Vietnam ===
Located in Tu Liem district, Hanoi, Vietnam, The Vietnam People's Police Academy is one of the leading schools of the Vietnam People's Public Security, training officers with university degrees and postgraduate degrees. The People's Police Academy is a training center under the jurisdiction of the Ministry of Public Security.

In 1968, the People's Police was established within the Department of the Public Security Police (now known as the Academy of the People's Security).

Its primary responsibilities are:

- Training police officers with university degrees and postgraduate courses;
- Studying the scientific topics of the National Crime Prevention; Administration of State Security Order, Criminal Law, Works of Justice investigation
- International Training Cooperation with foreign police academies

In addition to future police officers, it also trains firefighters who serve in the VPPS officer corps.

== See also ==
- Police training officer
- Field training officer
- Field training program
- Military academy
- Recruit training
