= Law enforcement in Ethiopia =

Crime in Ethiopia
- Homicide: 8.5 (2012)
- reported per 100,000 inhabitants

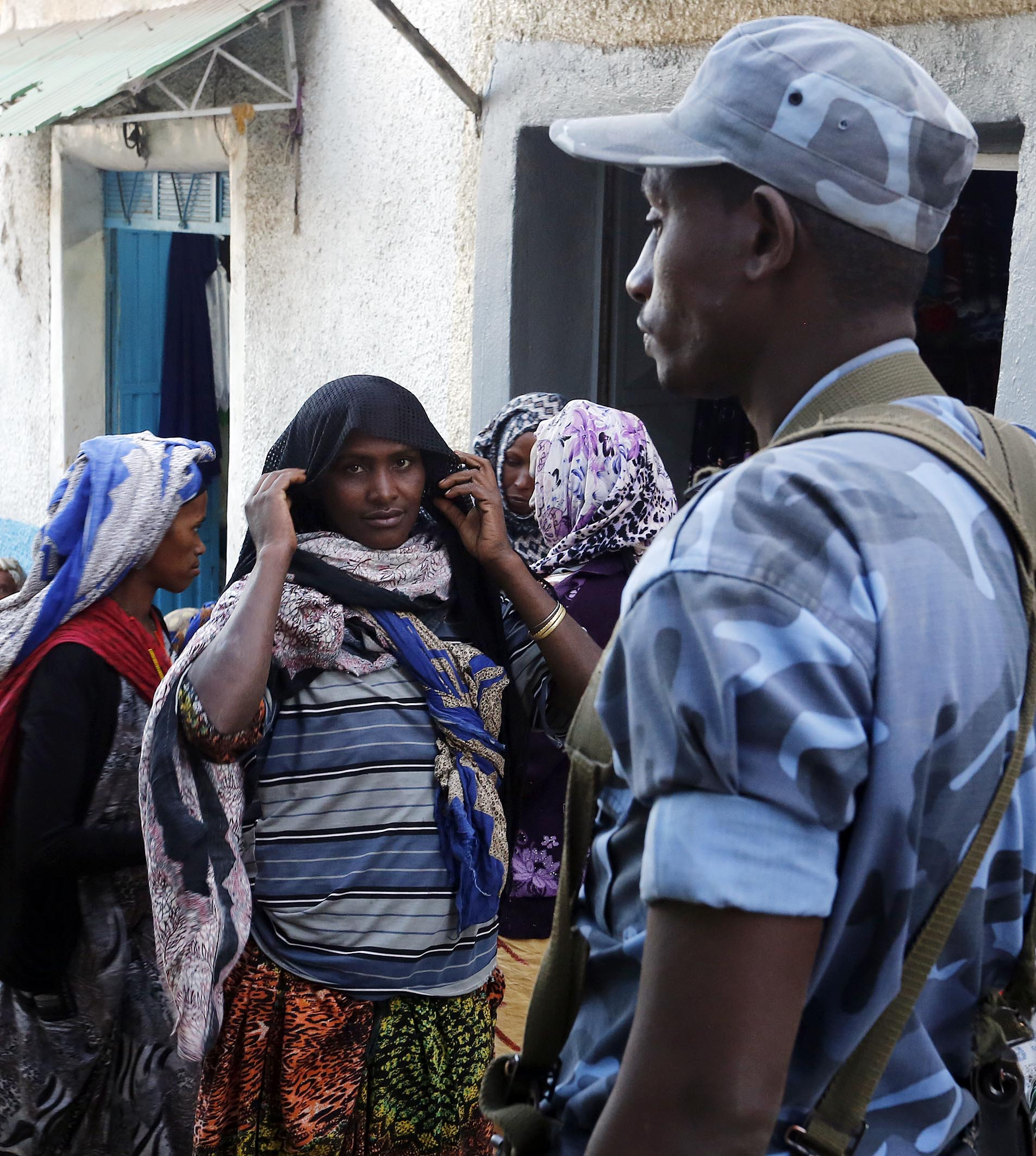
An Ethiopian Federal Police officer in Harar.

Law enforcement in Ethiopia is dealt with by the Ethiopian Federal Police at federal level and by regional police commissions in the Regions of Ethiopia. The Ethiopian Federal Police (EFP) was established in 1995 to serve the public, to ensure the observation of human and democratic rights and to maintain the safety and welfare of the public. Its stated duties are the enforcement of laws and safeguarding constitutional guarantees, the prevention, detection and investigation of crime, the coordination of national state police commissions and development of national policing standards. The EFP also has to provide operational support to regional police commissions.
However, local militias also provide local security largely independent of the police and the Ethiopian military. Corruption is a perennial problem, particularly among traffic police who solicited bribes.
The U.S. Department of State states that its contacts within the Ethiopian government report that the findings of investigations into abuses by local security forces, such as arbitrary detentions and beatings of civilians, are rarely made public. However, the Ethiopian government continued its efforts to train police and army recruits in human rights. During 2008 the government was seeking assistance from the International Committee of the Red Cross, the local non-governmental organization Prison Fellowship Ethiopia (JFA-PFE), and the Ethiopian Human Rights Commission to improve and professionalize its human rights training and curriculum. The JFA-PFE provided human rights training for police commissioners and members of the militia in 2008.

== History ==
In traditional Ethiopian society, customary procedures resolved conflicts. One example of these customary procedures was the tradition of parties in civil, and even minor criminal disputes, to call upon a passing stranger to decide the issue. As Margary Perham notes, "These informal roadside courts might last for hours to the deep interest of the spectators, and many travellers have described this characteristic Ethiopian scene." Families usually avenged wrongs committed against their members, and the armed retainers of the nobility enforced law in the countryside according to the will of their leaders. In 1916 the imperial government formed a civilian municipal guard in Addis Ababa to ensure obedience to legal proclamations. The general public despised the municipal guard, nearly all of whose members were inefficient at preserving public order or investigating criminal activities.

As part of his efforts to modernize the country, Emperor Haile Selassie undertook several reforms to improve law enforcement. The first was the drafting of a criminal code in 1930, but was not distributed until 1932. This was followed in 1935 by the establishment of formal, British-trained police forces in Addis Ababa and four other cities. This replaced a police force of about 3,000 men who operated in and around Addis Ababa, Dire Dawa, and along the route of the railway, and had been reorganized by Belgian advisors. These promising beginnings were snuffed out with Ethiopia's defeat in the Second Italo-Abyssinian War.

After his restoration to power in 1941, the emperor promulgated the founding of the Imperial Ethiopian Police in Proclamation 4/1942. This was organized under British tutelage as a centralized national force with paramilitary and constabulary units. Then in 1946 the authorities opened the Ethiopian Police College at Sendafa.

Further developments was the promulgation of a new penal code, written by the jurist J. Graven of Switzerland in 1957, which was part of a series of legal codifications which included the promulgation of a criminal procedure code in 1961, written by jurist Sir C. Matthew of the United Kingdom. In 1956 the imperial government amalgamated the separate city police forces with the national police force. Initially administered as a department of the Ministry of Interior, the national police had evolved, by the early 1970s, into an independent agency commanded by a police commissioner responsible to the emperor.

Local control over police was minimal, despite imperial proclamations that granted police authority to governors general of the provinces. Assistant police commissioners in each of the fourteen provinces worked in conjunction with the governors general, but for the most part Addis Ababa directed administration. The Territorial Army's provincial units, commanded by the governor general and consisting of an unpaid civilian auxiliary, assisted the national police force in areas where police were scarce. Police posts were found in all cities and larger towns and at strategic points along the main roads in the countryside. The police usually recruited local men who were familiar with the social values of the areas in which they served; however, the populace rarely looked upon such individuals with affection. Police operations generally emphasized punishment rather than prevention.

By 1974 the national police numbered approximately 28,000 in all branches, including 6,000 in the Mobile Emergency Police Force, 1,200 frontier guards, and a 3,200-member commando unit with rapid reaction capability. The Federal Republic of Germany (West Germany) supplied the paramilitary police with weapons and vehicles and installed a nationwide teleprinter system, while Israeli counterinsurgency specialists trained commandos and frontier guards. About 5,000 constabulary police, mostly recruited locally, served in Eritrea, as did 2,500 commandos.

After the 1974 Ethiopian revolution, the Derg severely circumscribed the authority of the national police, which had been identified with the old regime and regional interests. The authorities accused constables of protecting landowners against peasants in the countryside, of arresting supporters of the military regime in Addis Ababa, and of being members of the "rightist opposition." In Eritrea, however, the army already had taken over police functions in January 1975 from local police units suspected of being sympathetic to the secessionists. The Asmera police voluntarily stayed at their posts for some time after their dismissal to protect civilians from attack by unruly soldiers.

In 1977 the national police were re-organized, and a politically reliable commissioner put in command. A security committee formulated policy, which then was implemented by the Ministry of Interior. The army assumed a larger role in criminal investigation and in maintaining public order. People's Protection Brigades took over local law enforcement duties previously assigned to the constabulary. As a result of these changes, by 1982 the strength of the national police had declined to about 17,000. Mengistu also created the army's new Eighth Division from police commando units. Other special units joined the augmented 9,000-member paramilitary Mobile Emergency Police Force for employment in counterinsurgency operations.

The Directorate of Police, which reported to the commissioner, included the special Criminal Investigation Branch, which had the role in directing police counterinsurgency activities through regional branch offices. Another branch of the directorate investigated economic crimes, particularly smuggling and other forms of illicit commerce. The Revolutionary Operations Coordinating Committee, organized at the subregion level, cooperated with the police in battling smuggling and economic sabotage.

The Marxist regime stressed that the mission of the national police was essentially political—more involved with suppressing political dissent as the local law enforcement role shifted to People's Protection Brigades. Mengistu described the police mission as contributing to the "intensification of the class struggle".

The government adopted a policy whereby police constables were recruited at an early age and trained in their native regions. Training was designed to allow police stationed in remote areas to be self-sufficient in building and maintaining their posts. Training standards were not uniform, and, unless it took place in Addis Ababa, in-service or specialized training was limited. In politically stable rural areas where duty requirements and supervision were less exacting, the police were less efficient than their urban counterparts. A high percentage of rural constables could neither read nor write and therefore did not keep records of their activities. Many crimes were considered to be matters concerning only the persons involved and were often ignored by the police unless one of the interested parties filed a complaint.

The Addis Ababa police, by contrast, were organized into uniformed, detective, and traffic units; a riot squad, or "flying column"; and a police laboratory—organizational refinements not found in regional police units. A small number of women served in police units in large cities. Generally, they were employed in administrative positions or as guards for female prisoners. National police officers were paid according to the same standardized wage scale that applied to members of the armed forces.

As a rule, police in constabulary units were armed only with batons. Small arms usually were kept in designated armouries and were issued for specific duties. Matériel used by paramilitary units included heavy machine guns, submachine guns, automatic rifles, side arms, mortars, grenades, tear gas, light armoured vehicles, and other equipment adaptable to riot control and counterinsurgency operations. Larger police units, such as the one in Addis Ababa, were also equipped with modern military vehicles, which were used as patrol cars and police vans. In many rural areas, however, horses and mules were often the sole means of transportation for constables.

In January 1992, a "Charter of National and Regional States" proclamation No. 7/1992 was issued. Under this proclamation, the national and regional states were vested with the power of establishing their own police forces.

== Ethiopian Federal Police ==
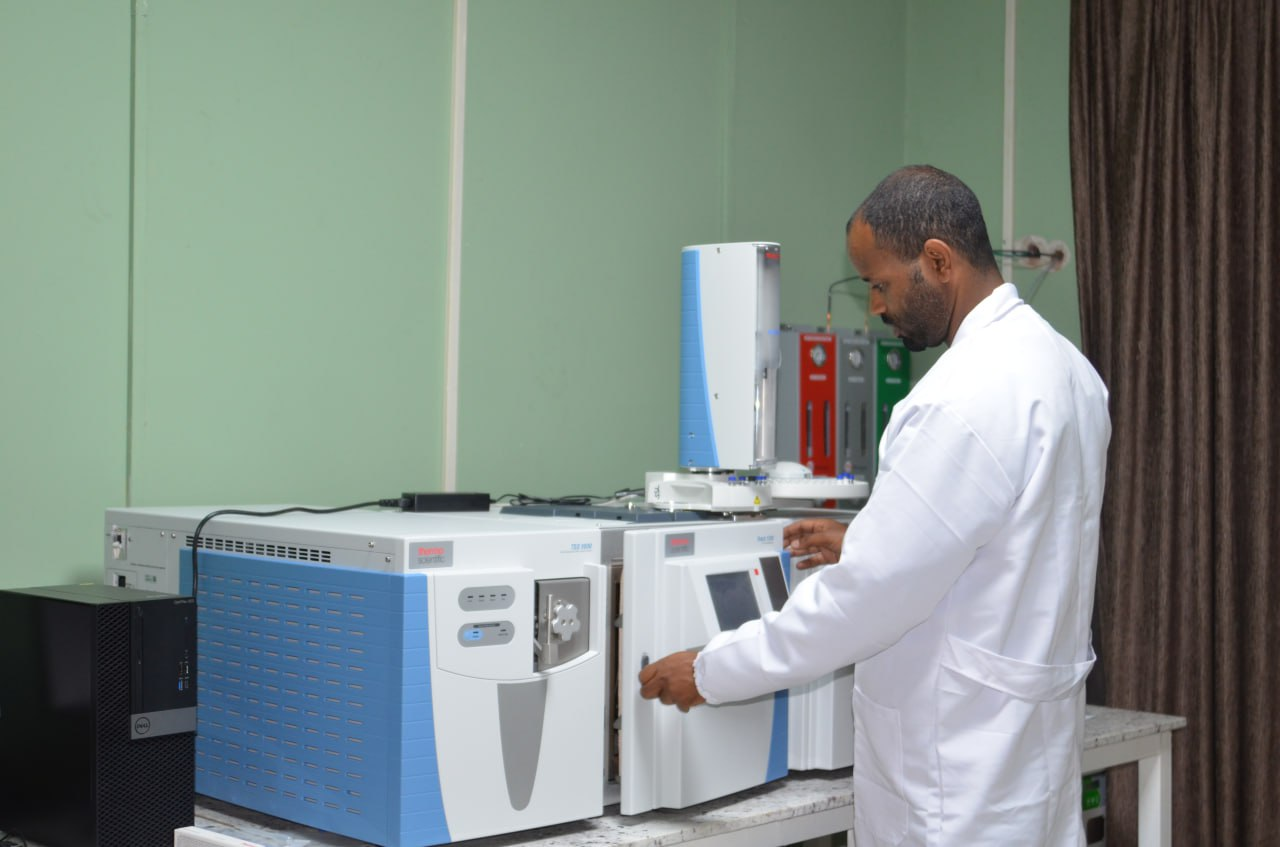
The Forensic Investigations Unit of the EFP

The Ethiopian Federal Police (EFP) was established as a federal organ having its own legal personality tasked to maintain law and order at federal level, as well as to deal with riot control. Since a reorganization in October 2000, the responsibility of the federal police has been transferred to the Federal Police Commission, which oversees the EPF. The Commission reports to the Ministry of Peace following the politically motivated reform of 2018, which in turn is responsible to the parliament; however, this subordination is loose in practice. In previous years, the police reported to the Security, Immigration, and Refugees Affairs Authority, a unit of the Ethiopian Ministry of Justice.

Within the EPF, the Special Force is tasked with the duty of keeping peace and security during riots, violence and demonstrations.

At the supreme level, the Federal Police Commissioner is assisted by the Council of Commissioners and directly controls three services and two offices: the Legal Service, the Ethics and Anti Corruption Services, the Public Relation Services, the Office of Commissioner and the Addis Ababa, Diredawa & Regional coordination office.

The Deputy Commissioner depends on the Federal Police Commissioner and handles the main operational Main Departments: Crime Forensic investigation, Crime Prevention and Support Service Main Departments. The Deputy Commissioner also commands the Ethics police college, the Human Resources and Administration and the Research and Planning departments.

=== Riot control ===
The Ethiopian Federal Police is in charge of riot control. This activity is dealt with by the Riot Control Department, which is part of the Crime Prevention Main Department. The Riot Control Department, in turn, is subdivided into 5 Riot Divisions (the operational arm), and into three auxiliary Divisions: Support Division, Information and Intelligence Division and Training and Appointment Division. Each Riot Division has three battalions with each battalion having about 400 men. Battalions are further subdivided into Platoons and both layers have their own equipment. The total Riot Police strength is approximately 6000.

=== Rank structure ===
During Emperor Haile Selassie and Dergue regimes, there were mainly three levels. At present, the hierarchical structure is almost the same except for the difference in title designation. The lower level ranges from constable to chief sergeant, the medium level from deputy inspector to inspector, and the top level from chief inspector to commissioner (Federal Police Regulation No. 86/2003).
According to the Ethiopian Federal Police Commission Establishment Proclamation No. 720/2011, the ranks of police officers are the following from lowest to highest:

1. Constable;
2. Assistant Sergeant;
3. Deputy Sergeant;
4. Sergeant;
5. Chief Sergeant;
6. Assistant Inspector;
7. Deputy Inspector;
8. Inspector;
9. Chief Inspector;
10. Deputy Commander;
11. Commander;
12. Assistant Commissioner;
13. Deputy Commissioner;
14. Commissioner;
15. Deputy Commissioner General;
16. Commissioner General

== Prisons ==
As of 2015, Ethiopia's prison system consists of six federal prisons, 120 local prisons, and many unofficial detention centers. Prison and pretrial detention center conditions remained harsh and in some cases life-threatening. Severe overcrowding was a problem. In October 2008 it was reported that there were 52,000 persons in prison. Earlier that year, prison populations decreased by 10,000 due to pardons but reportedly again increased due to increases in ethnic conflict and economic crimes.

Prison conditions have been reported as unsanitary and there was no budget for prison maintenance. Medical care was unreliable in federal prisons and almost nonexistent in regional prisons. The daily meal budget was approximately 9 birr (US 43 cents) per prisoner, and many prisoners supplemented this with daily food deliveries from their family or by purchasing food from local vendors. Prisoners often had less than 22 square feet (2.0 m^{2}) of sleeping space in a room that could contain up to 200 persons; sleeping in rotations was not uncommon in regional prisons.

Kaliti Prison is a federal prison on the southern outskirts of Addis Ababa.

== Secret police organizations ==
- Central Revolutionary Investigation Department (CRID)

== See also ==
- Human rights in Ethiopia
- Police brutality in Ethiopia
