= People's Protection Brigades =

Law enformcement agency of Ethiopia (1978–1991)

People's Protection Brigades የህዝብ ጥበቃ ብርጌዶች

Agency overview
- Preceding agency: 1978
- Dissolved: 1991
- Superseding agency: Ethiopian Federal Police

Jurisdictional structure
- National agency: Ethiopia
- Operations jurisdiction: Ethiopia
- General nature: Civilian police

Operational structure
- Headquarters: Addis Ababa, Ethiopia

The People's Protection Brigades (Amharic: የህዝብ ጥበቃ ብርጌዶች) were a type of law enforcement organization in the Derg regime in Ethiopia.

== History ==
Soon after the overthrow of the Imperial regime, the Derg moved to consolidate the revolution at the grass-roots level by promoting the creation of peasant associations and kebeles. These associations had tribunals that permitted them to exercise criminal and civil jurisdiction over legal matters. More important, the government also legitimized local defense squads, granting them police powers within designated areas. Defense squads also protected public property and enforced land reform measures, but their original function was the essentially political one of rounding up—and often disposing of—suspected government opponents. During the Red Terror campaign of 1977–78, the power of the kebeles was virtually unrestricted, and the defense squads emerged as the regime's chief instruments of coercion within the capital. However, in reaction to the defense squads' excessive use of violence, Mengistu curbed their powers in April 1978.

In 1978 the People's Protection Brigades were created from an estimated 10,000 defense squad vigilantes. Their function was to act as local law enforcement agencies within the jurisdiction of each peasant association and kebele. Although promoted as instruments of decentralization, the brigades answered to the security chief of the Central Committee of the Commission to Organize the Party of the Workers of Ethiopia. Although the People's Protection Brigades retained a political role, after 1980 these paramilitary units concentrated on local police duties. Brigade members received up to five months' training in police and military tactics from East German instructors. Some brigade personnel had served on active duty in Eritrea, Tigray, and the Ogaden.

== See also ==
- Law enforcement in Ethiopia
- Central Revolutionary Investigation Department (CRID) - the Secret police
- Human rights in Ethiopia
