= Law enforcement in Qatar =

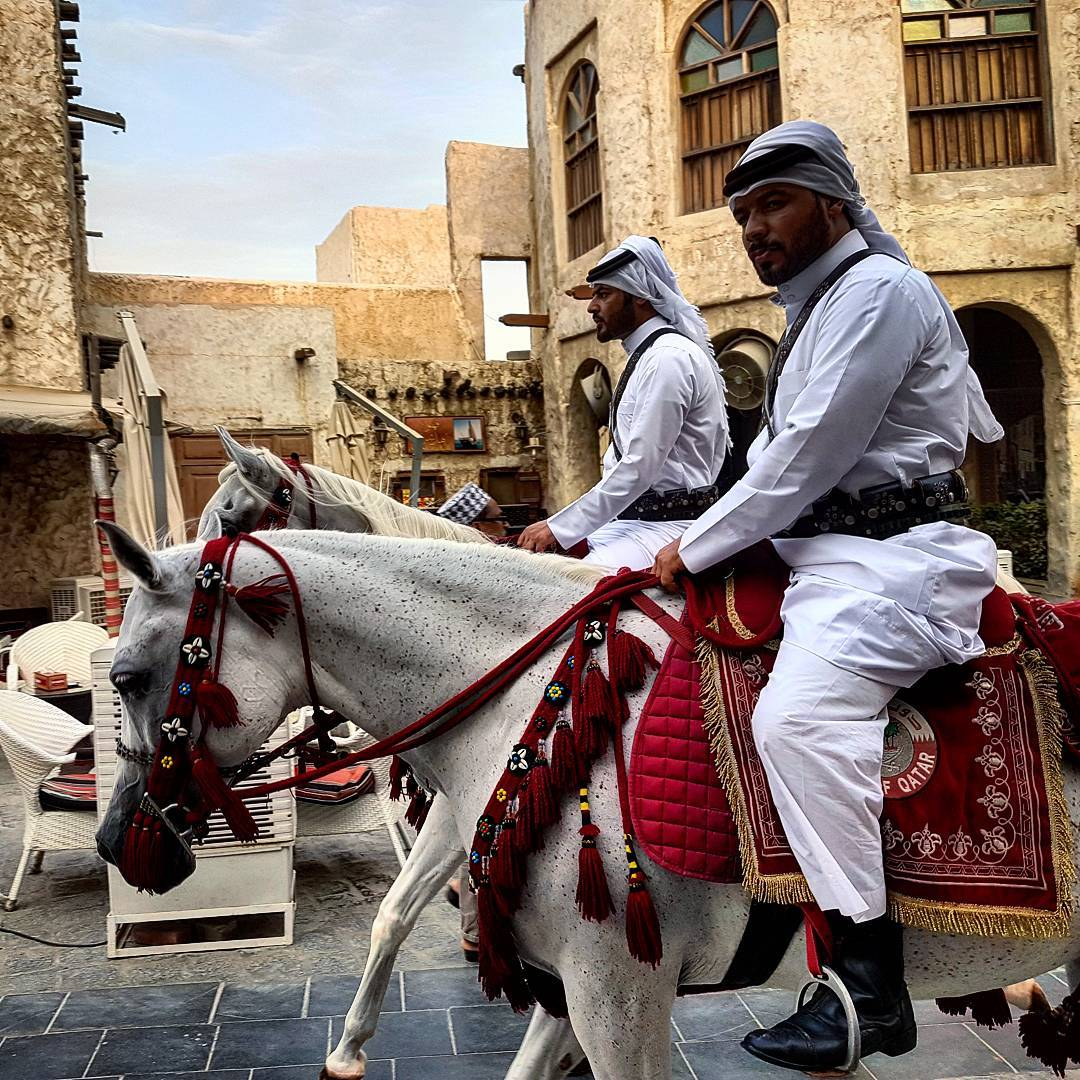
Qatari mounted police in Souq Waqif

In Qatar, the responsibility for law enforcement lies with the Ministry of Interior under current minister Sheikh Khalifa bin Hamad bin Khalifa Al Thani. The ministry administers the various law enforcement agencies of Qatar. To become a policeman or a policewoman in a law enforcement agency in Qatar attendance to a police academy is required.

== History ==
The first police agency formed in the State of Qatar was the 'Discipline Police' in 1949. This agency began its duties in 1949 at Doha Police Section which was located in the centre of Souq Waqif. The functions of this section consisted of providing security protection for citizens, maintaining discipline by moving patrols, carrying out the mission of permanent guards at vital areas in the capital and organising traffic movement. It also carried out all other police related duties such as conducting investigations on criminal and traffic cases and referring the accused to the courts.

In response to widespread protests which broke out in Qatar in 1956, then-emir Ali bin Abdullah Al Thani began heavily investing in the police force. As a result, a new police headquarters was built during the 1950s.

The Qatar Police played a role in securing the 2022 FIFA World Cup. Furthermore, over 3,000 Turkish riot police officers were deployed alongside Qatari forces to help manage crowds and secure stadiums.

On July 18, 2024, Qatari police officers were deployed throughout Paris as part of agreement with France to assist in protecting the public due to terrorism concerns prior to the upcoming Olympic games.

== Law enforcement agencies ==
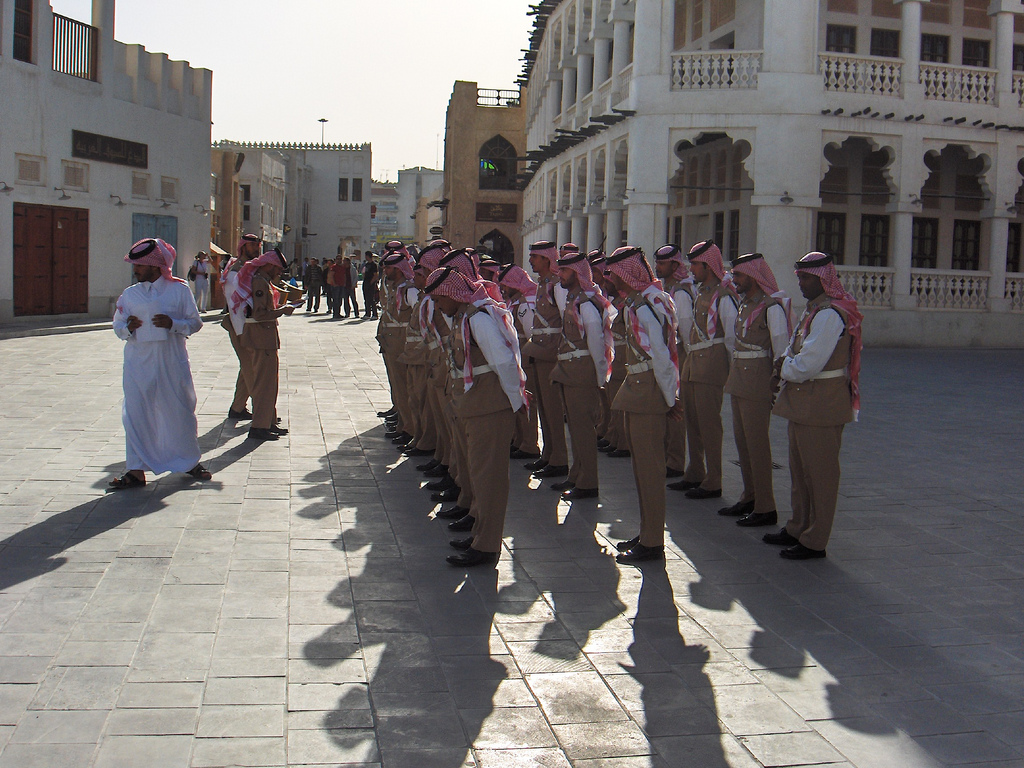
Qatari police at Souq Waqif

The various law enforcement agencies of Qatar are under the authority of the Ministry of Interior's General Directorate of Public Safety, which was created in 1970.

There are numerous law enforcement agencies and departments in Qatar, with each one being responsible for a different aspect of policing. These include, amongst others, Traffic Police Department, the Rescue Police Department (Al-Fazaa), the Juvenile Police Department Cyber Security, and the Airports Security and Passports Department.

=== Traffic Police Department ===
The Traffic Police Department in Qatar plays a crucial role in maintaining road safety and enforcing traffic laws. It operates under the Ministry of Interior and oversees various activities, including traffic regulation, law enforcement, licensing, and accident management. The department was established to meet the growing demands of traffic safety in the rapidly developing nation. Its efforts include promoting safe driving practices, conducting awareness campaigns, and introducing modern technologies like surveillance systems and digital platforms for reporting violations.

=== Rescue Police Department (Al-Fazaa) ===
The Rescue Police Department, or Al-Fazaa, was established in March 2009 by the Decree of Minister of State for Interior Affairs No. (13) of 2009. It is responsible for the organization and arrangement of police patrols through all regions of the capital and the area of competence of the Al Rayyan Security Department, providing pro-active police services to prevent crime before it occurs, responding to emergency calls from the public and for providing support and assistance to all of the Ministry's departments.

=== Juvenile Police Department ===
In 1989 the Juvenile Police Department was established as a stand-alone department by the Minister of Interior in accordance with Article 5 of the Juveniles Act and is under the remit of the General Directorate of Public Safety. The department got its mandate from the Juveniles Act, which defines the department's duties and responsibilities. Its primary responsibilities under the act are as follows:

- investigate juvenile cases and hold delinquents to sentence them in accordance with the law;
- to give advice on the case of a child who has already been sentenced in an offense, by one of the measures provided for in the Juvenile Act;
- attending the trial sessions of juveniles and creating an execution file for each case, presented with all proceedings concerning the juvenile or court to which the case is awaiting;
- submit requests for release under condition of juvenile delinquents sentenced to imprisonment based on reports prepared by the Social Preparation Center in accordance with the law; and
- any other tasks assigned to it.

The department holds the power to detain delinquents for a period not exceeding 48 hours if "circumstances demand for it", but a court may order for an extension to that period.

=== Airport Security Department ===
The Airport Security and Passports Department (ASPD) is responsible for the direct supervision of entry and exit from and to Qatar, and was established as an independent entity in 2004 by Ministerial Decree No. (37) of 2004 under the authority of the General Directorate of Public Safety. The department specialises in security and service tasks related to the daily dealing with the public, as well as taking measures to maintain security and regulate the traffic through Hamad International Airport.

=== Qatar State Security ===
Qatar State Security (QSS) is a division under the Ministry of Interior (MOI) responsible for ensuring national security and stability in Qatar. It focuses on countering internal and external threats, safeguarding critical infrastructure, and maintaining public safety. The agency handles intelligence gathering, counterterrorism efforts, and monitoring activities that could undermine the country's security. Operating within Qatar's centralized government structure, the QSS works closely with other MOI departments and international security organizations to combat emerging threats, including cyberattacks and regional instability. It plays a critical role in the nation's overall strategy to ensure security and order. They were formed as a result of a merger between the Secret Police Office and Investigation and State Security Service.

== Training ==
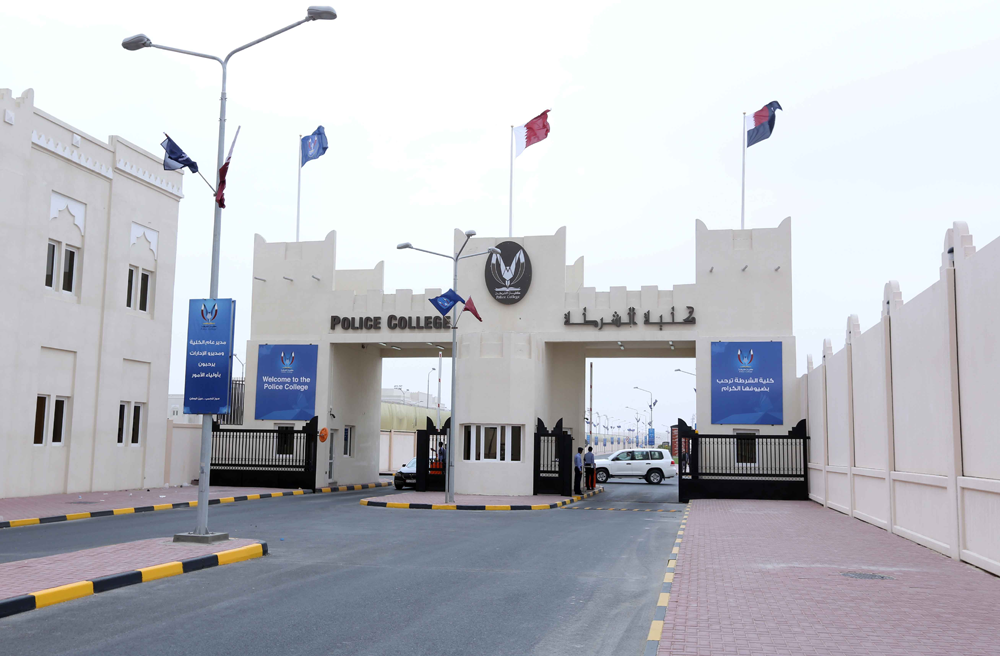
Main entrance of the police college in Qatar

Police officers are required to attend the police academy in Doha before they can be admitted into the force or attend university and do a simpler police academy which is just for 3 months for those who have a bachelor's degree . Historically, the police force was overwhelmingly composed of males. There were only 30 females in the police force prior to 2003. That year, a whole female squadron with 107 women graduated from Qatar's police academy for the first time in history.

In December 2013, Qatar's emir Tamim Al Thani passed a decree to establish a four-year police college. A police official stated that the objective of establishing the institution was to create a highly trained police force which would be able to maintain security in large events such as the 2022 FIFA World Cup. The college opened in August 2014 with an enrolment of 130 students and a budget of QR 2.5 bn. Successful students will graduate with a bachelor's degree in law and police science, and will automatically earn the rank of lieutenant.

== Prisons ==
Qatar's main prison, the Qatar Central Prison, was established in February 1986 off of Salwa Road.

== See also ==
- Qatar State Security
- Lekhwiya

== Bibliography ==
- Das, Dilip; Palmiotto, Michael (2006). World police encyclopedia. Routledge. ISBN 978-0-415-94252-2.
- Moi Qatar Portal
