= National Police Academy =

National Police Academy can refer to:

- General Santander National Police Academy, Colombia
- National Police Academy (Nepal), Kathmandu
- National Police Academy (Pakistan), Islamabad
- Sardar Vallabhbhai Patel National Police Academy, Hyderabad, India
- Swedish National Police Academy
- Turkish National Police Academy
- General José Trinidad Cabañas National Police Academy of Honduras

== See also ==
- Police academy
