= Qatar State Security =

Qatari intelligence agency

Qatar State Security (Arabic: جهاز أمن الدولة) is the state intelligence agency of Qatar. It is an independent organization.

== History ==
It was created in 2004, after the General Intelligence Service (Mukhabarat) and the Investigation and State Security Service (Mubahith) merged. It performs internal security investigations, gathers intelligence, and has primary responsibility for sedition and espionage cases.

The agency has been accused of human rights violations over arbitrary arrests of citizens without court warrants for expressing opinions on social media. On February 7, 2022, Human Rights Watch drafted a report out which states that the State Security Apparatus Law "does not provide for any judicial oversight over such detention, and the Working Group was informed that in practice, such detention leads to very long periods of deprivation of liberty, in violation of international human rights norms," according to a statement from the UN Working Group on Arbitrary Detention after an official visit to Qatar in 2019. Now, everyone has the freedom to leave any country, including their own, according to the International Covenant on Civil and Political Rights, which Qatar adopted in 2018. The treaty permits nations to place limitations on that right, provided that they are authorized by law and necessary and reasonable to safeguard the country's security, public order, health, morals, or other rights and freedoms.

On 16 August 2024 CIA director Bill Burns awarded head of Qatar State Security Abdullah bin Mohammed Al Khulaifi the George Tenet medal for his role in strengthening intelligence cooperation with the USA and "maintaining national and regional security". The ceremony took place at the CIA headquarters, as the two countries played key mediating roles in Gaza ceasefire talks, which were held in Doha.

== See also ==
- Law enforcement in Qatar
- Lekhwiya
