= University Institute of the Argentine Federal Police =

Argentine Federal Police academy

Coordinates: 34°37′11″S 58°26′11″W

- Instituto Universitario de la Policía Federal Argentina
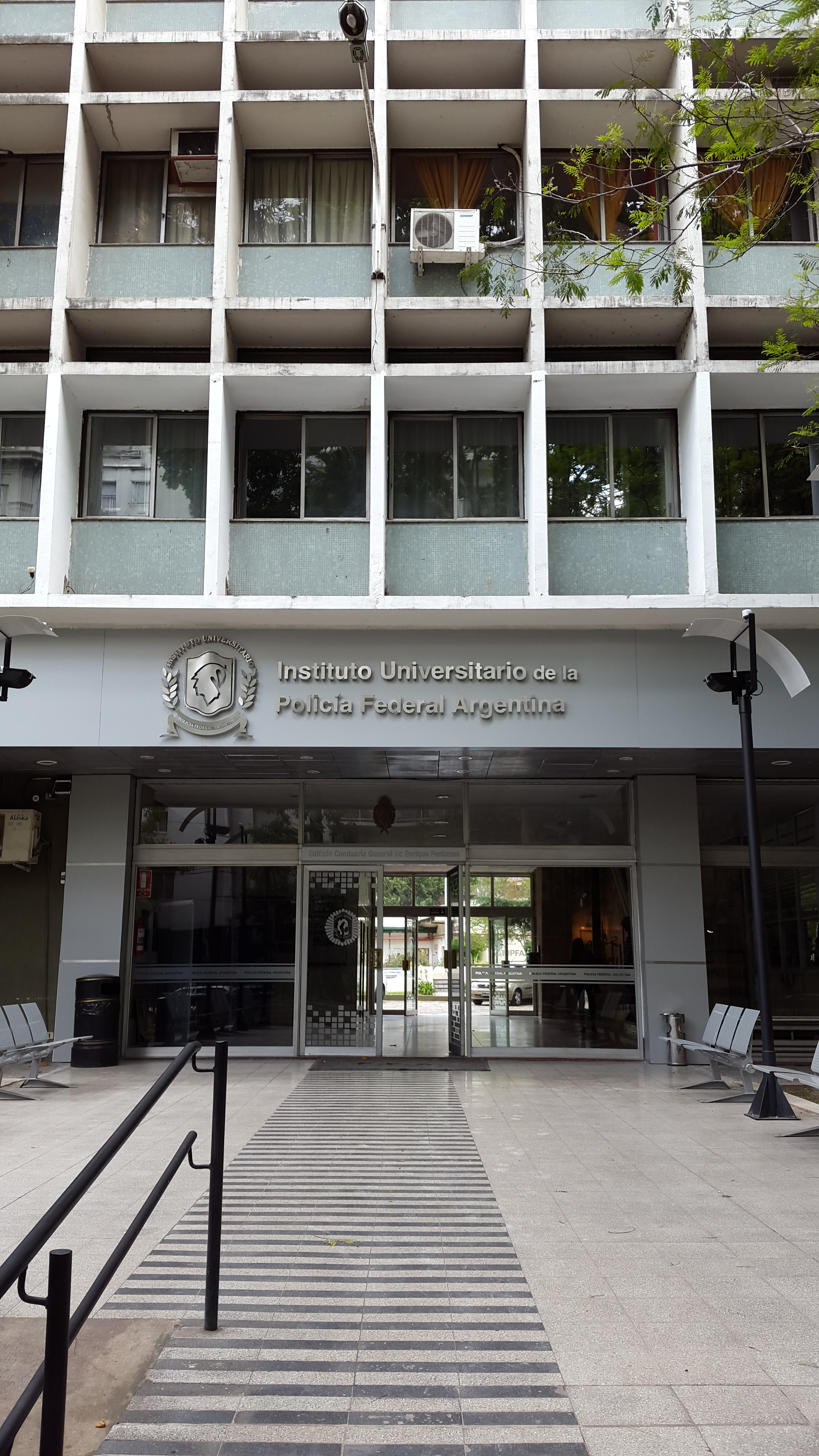
- Other names: IUPFA
- Type: Public police academy
- Established: August 2, 1974
- Chancellor: Prof. Leopoldo Fabian Vidal
- Vice-Chancellor: Dr. Claudia Burgos
- Location: Rosario 532, Buenos Aires, Argentina
- Campus: Urban
- Website: http://www.universidad-policial.edu.ar/

The University Institute of the Argentine Federal Police (Spanish: Instituto Universitario de la Policía Federal Argentina) is a teaching and research institution created with the purpose of providing higher-level training and improvement to the Argentine Federal Police (AFP). It is located in Buenos Aires.

The Institute provides training to the police force as well as to the rest of Argentina's civilian population. It also has various agreements with other police forces and organizations such as Interpol.

== History ==
The university dates back to August 2, 1974, after it was determined that the creation of a university-level establishment with national validity was necessary. The creation of such an institution was a longstanding need for the AFP, and fulfilling such goals required competent teachers and a technical infrastructure commensurate with the complexity of the activities carried out at previous Argentine police academies. In this way, the UIAFP would become one of the few institutions to provide a constant focus on training and development to members of all security forces, as required by circumstance.

== Classes ==
The school offers classes in conflict resolution, mediation, and more. It is divided into separate schools for cadets, police officers, and non-commissioned officers.

== Organization ==
The university's management consists of a board of directors and an academic council.
