= Arkauti =

Hamlet in Álava, Spain

Arkauti/Arcaute
- Concejo
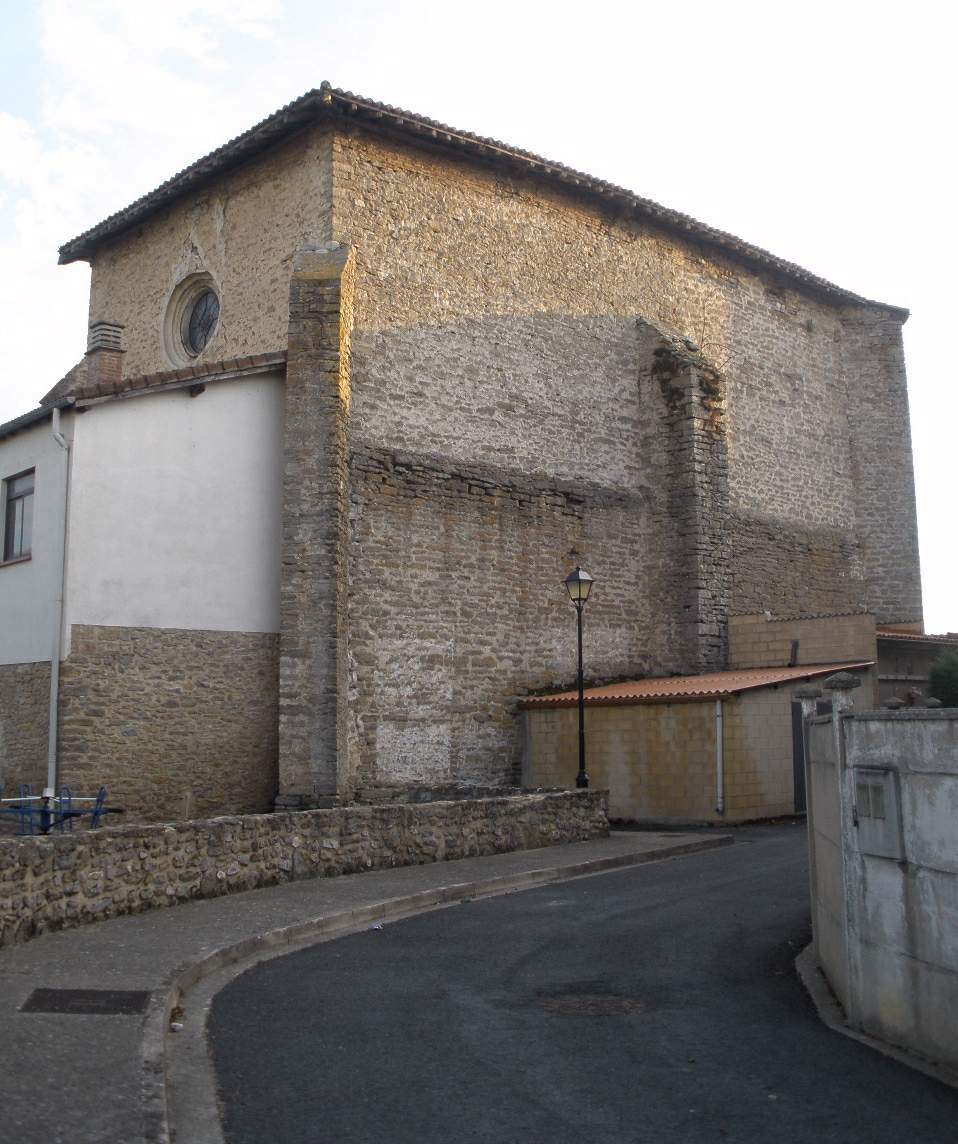
- Church of San Juan Bautista

- Coat of arms

- Location within Álava Location within the Basque Country Location within Spain
- Coordinates: 42°51′05″N 2°38′06″W
- Country: Spain
- Autonomous community: Basque Country
- Province: Álava
- Comarca: Vitoria-Gasteiz
- Municipality: Vitoria-Gasteiz

Area
  - Total: 3.48 km^{2} (1.34 sq mi)
- Elevation: 515 m (1,690 ft)

Population (2023)
  - Total: 80
  - Density: 23/km^{2} (60/sq mi)
- Postal code: 01192

Arkauti (Basque pronunciation: [arkauti]) or Arcaute (Spanish pronunciation: [aɾˈkawte]) is a hamlet and concejo in the municipality of Vitoria-Gasteiz, in Álava province, Basque Country, Spain.
