= Sendafa =

Town in central Ethiopia

Sendafa ሰንዳፋ Sandafaa
- Town
- Location within Ethiopia Sendafa (Africa)
- Coordinates: 9°9′N 39°2′E
- Country: Ethiopia
- Region: Oromia
- Zone: Oromia Special Zone
- Elevation: 2,514 m (8,248 ft)

Population (2007)
  - Total: 12,298
- Time zone: UTC+3 (EAT)

Sendafa (Oromo: Sandafaa; Amharic: ሰንዳፋ) is a town in central Ethiopia. It also serves as a separate district in the Oromia Region of Ethiopia, and its name is taken from the Oromo name for a kind of thick, jointed grass or reed which grows in swampy areas. Located in the Oromia Special Zone Surrounding Finfinne of the Oromia Region, Sendafa has a latitude and longitude of 9°09′N 39°02′E with an elevation of 2514 meters above sea level. The town lies on the paved Addis Ababa - Adigrat highway, some 38 kilometers north of the capital.

== Overview ==
Sendafa has a moderate temperature; June, July and August are principal rainy season. The town has one senior secondary school, which started enrolling students in 1987.

Sendafa enjoys relatively moderate technological facilities compared to other towns of the same size in its Zone. Major public institutions here include the Ethiopian Police College and the Sendafa military camp. The town is also the planned location for the new training centre of the Ethiopian People's Revolutionary Democratic Front, budgeted to cost 80 million birr. This plan includes a seven-story headquarters building to be built in Arat Kilo

US Peace Corps Volunteers served in Sedafa between 1966 and 1970.

== Demographics ==
In 2022 the total population was estimated at 25,502 of whom males 13,086 and females 12,416.

The 2007 national census reported a total population for Sendafa of 12,298, of whom 6,373 were men and 5,925 were women. The majority of the inhabitants said they practised Ethiopian Orthodox Christianity, with 84.15% of the population reporting they practised that belief, 11.38% were Muslim.

Based on figures from the Central Statistical Agency in 2005, this town has an estimated total population of 9,952 of whom 4,737 are men and 5,215 are women. The 1994 national census reported this town had a total population of 5,573 of whom 2,569 were men and 3,004 were women.

== Relief work ==
For the past several years, the non-denominational Living Word Community Church in York, Pennsylvania, has partnered with the village of Sendafa, sending teams of church members to provide medical and educational supplies. In 2010, Living Word Community Church members raised $10,000 to pay for a clean-water well to be drilled in Sendafa.
