= Sicherheitsakademie =

Austrian research institute

Sicherheitsakademie (SIAK, transl. Police Academy Austria) is the training and research institute of the Federal Ministry of the Interior of Austria. It is headquartered in the Marokkaner Barracks in the 3rd District of Vienna (Landstraße), but has training centres throughout Austria.

SIAK was established in Section 11 of the Security Police Act. It is a department within the Directorate-General I (Presidium).

Since 2003, SIAK has been headed by Dr. Norbert Leitner.

== Tasks ==
SIAK is responsible for training the 33.000 employees of the Federal Ministry of the Interior and its subordinated Directorates and Offices. This responsibility includes both basic and advanced training for police officers and administrative staff. SIAK also coordinates and evaluates research projects for the Ministry.

SIAK belongs to CEPOL (The European Agency for Law Enforcement Training). The Central Coordination Office of the Central European Police Academy (CEPA) and the Secretariat-General of the Association of European Police Colleges (AEPC) are located in SIAK; the activities of both institutions are guided and coordinated by SIAK.

Since April 2016, Director Leitner is also the President of AEPC.

== Organization ==
SIAK is divided into the following sections:

- Centre for Resources and Steering
- Centre for Basic Training
- Centre for Further (In-Service) Training
- Centre for International Affairs
- Institute for Science and Research

The SIAK Advisory Board consists of ten members. The Board advises the Minister of the Interior and the Director of the SIAK . on the organisation's composition, tasks and management as laid down in the Regulation on the Advisory Body.

== Police training ==
Each police recruit must undergo the "Basic Training for Police Officers" in one of the SIAK training centres. This training lasts for 24 months; at the end of this training the student has to pass a service exam. After passing this exam, the recruit will enter the service with the rank of an "Inspector".

After serving as an Inspector for several years, the police officer can attend an additional SIAK training to become an Officer in the mid-level ranks of the Austrian Police, s a managerial position. This training ends as well with a service exam. After passing the exam, the officer is assigned to leadership functions within a Police Inspection.

Police officers who have passed high school with an A-Level Diploma can apply for a senior position (comparable with a Commissioned Officer in Military Service). SIAK provides this training with the University of Applied Sciences in Wiener Neustadt as a bachelor-course "Police Leadership". The graduation leads to the academic bachelor's degree "Bachelor in Police Leadership", which is a prerequisite to be promoted to a Senior Police Officer's rank.

== Administrative career ==
The basic SIAK training for administrative staff is set up in modules in correspondence with the requirements of the individual post of the various service levels (A1/v1 – A4/v2). Staff in the Function Group A1 (officials) or the Function Group v1 (employees in civil service on a contractual basis) follow an academic career, whereas staff in the A2/v2 grades can enter this career path with a Higher School Diploma (A-Level Diploma).

== Academic career ==
Ministry staff who hold a bachelor's degree or who have passed their studies at a university or at a university of applied sciences with a master's degree can apply to the study of Strategic Security Management. SIAK provides this course with the University of Applied Sciences.

This study (Strategic Security Management) represents academically-oriented leadership training for top managerial functions in the field of security. The students qualify for the strategic level of leadership.

== Training centres ==
SIAK has ten training centres (German abbreviation: BZS) for police officers in Austria.

- Burgenland in Eisenstadt
- Carinthia in Krumpendorf
- Lower Austria in Ybbs an der Donau
- Traiskirchen in Lower Austria
- Upper Austria in Linz
- Salzburg in Großgmain
- Styria in Graz
- Tyrol in Absam
- Vorarlberg in Feldkirch
- Vienna in the Marokkaner Barracks
