= Police brutality in Ethiopia =

Unlawful use of force by police officer in Ethiopia

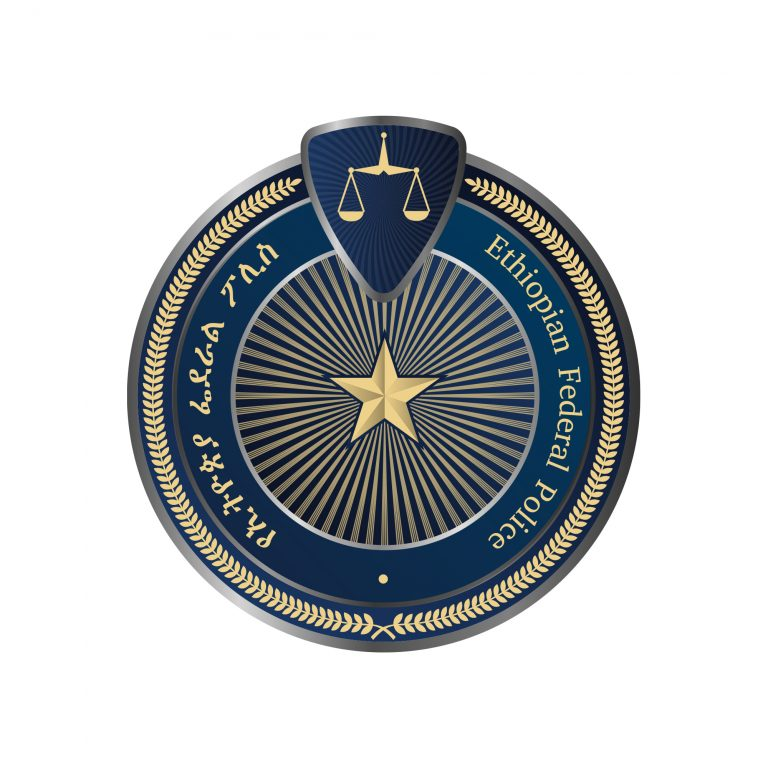
The Federal Police Commission coat of arms and logo

Police brutality in Ethiopia falls under the aegis of the Ethiopian Federal Police (EFP), which has responsibility for safeguarding civil law and abiding the country's constitution under Proclamation 2000, 2003 or 2011. Under Federal Police Officer Administration Regulation of 2012, dual obligation is promulgated to reinforce the law that every police officers should respect international human rights instructions and legal liability.

== Overview ==
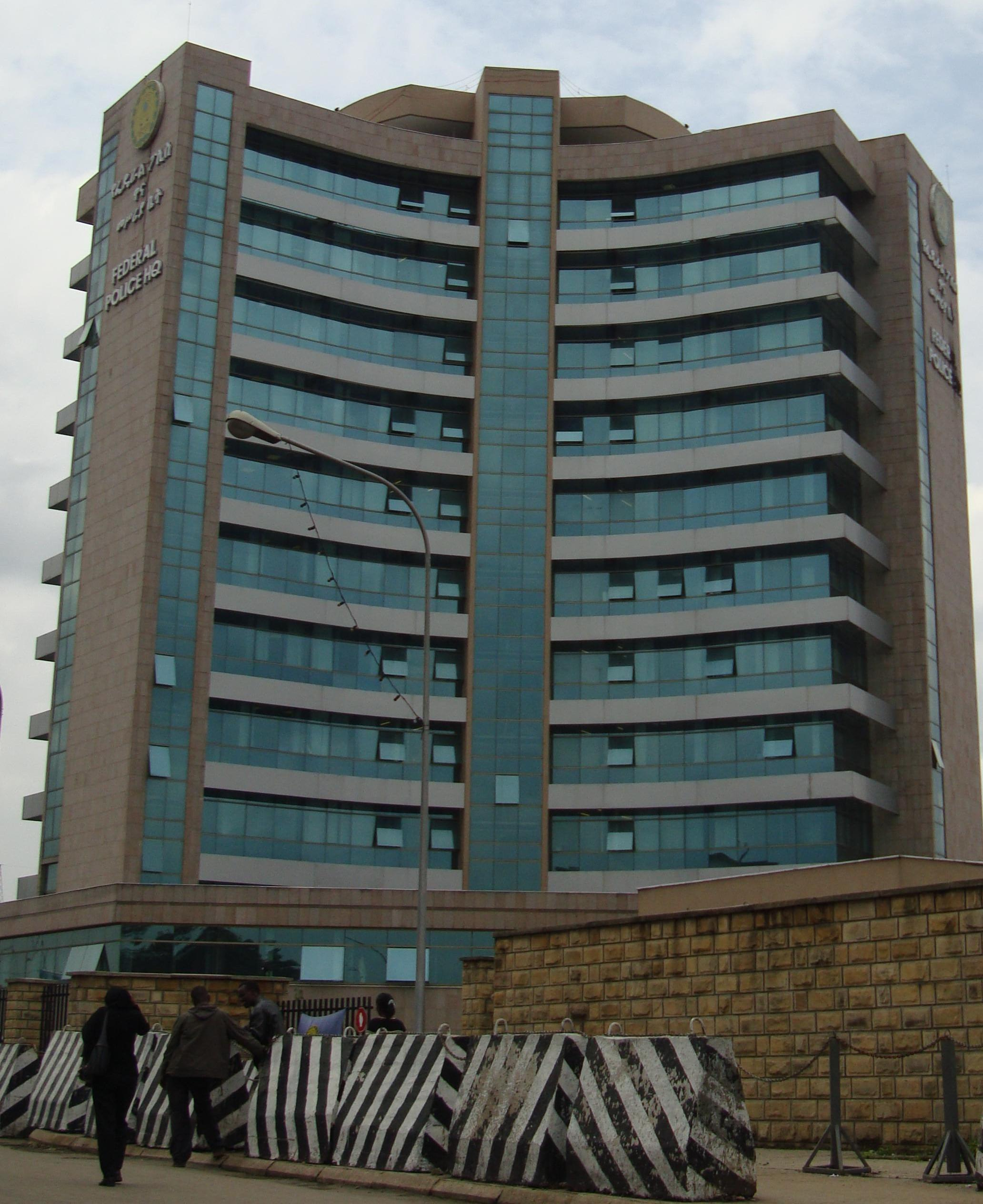
The Ethiopian Federal Police headquarter in Addis Ababa

Police brutality was first observed during the Derg regime who ruled the country from 1974 to 1991. Police forces were pertinent to repress ethnic nationalist rivals and enforce security, which also subjected to abuse the local population.

Following end of the Derg regime in 1991, the Ethiopian People's Revolutionary Democratic Front (EPRDF) chairman Meles Zenawi, new constitution was formed that incorporated police reforms. In 1994, he formed new police regiment consisted of militia while retaining the Derg police force or training them as most of dismissed.

The Federal Police Commission established in June 2000 with the first Federal Police Complaint Hearing Committee mandated for an investigation of any allegation of police misconduct and abuse of power. By April 2003, it was replaced by the Federal Police Complaint Hearing Organ, solely for an investigation of allegation in serious police misconduct. On Article 52 of Federal Police Officers Administration Regulation, these committee only allowed of dismissal and reinstating the police officers that abuse the authority.

The problem of incident of victimization in police brutality did not reflected in 2003 Federal Police Commission Proclamation, the 2011 Federal Police Commission Proclamation and the 2012 Federal Police Officers Administration Regulation. The African Union’s Luanda and Robben Island Guidelines or the United Nations’ Declaration on Justice for Victims of Abuse of Power and their Basic Principles on the Use of Force & Firearms obligated to establish disciplinary committee with the Ethiopian government to combat police brutality in both individual and systemic levels.

During the protest in 2005 general election, 193 people killed by police and military units. The situation evolved to the worst in the areas of Oromia and Gambela regions caused by ethnic unrest. The Ethiopian Federal Police (EFP) estimated number of staff at 30,000 in 2016 had active duty on enforcing law. Since assumption of Prime Minister Abiy Ahmed in April 2018, there were security reforms, including removal of senior figures from former regime, particularly military and intelligence sectors which deemed violated security organizations. In 2018, oversight was limited and Ministry of Peace introduced to survey the Federal Police, and in July 2019 new commissioner was appointed to the Ethiopian Human Rights Commission. The commissioner criticized publicly criticized the government and call for reform organizations.

On 26 August 2019, a video clip of tagged man beaten by two police officers in Addis Ababa, while an elderly woman intervened the scene. An anonymous Twitter user posted the clip with comment reading "morning starter …as usual the Police, our men in blue, protecting us…" The event stirred outrage who criticized the Prime Minister Abiy Ahmed, the then mayor of Addis Ababa Takele Uma Banti and Attorney General and Chief Justice.

Police misconduct aggravated during Abiy Ahmed administration where security forces frequently initiated crackdowns on journalists and activists from human rights organizations and other opposition groups.

== Restructuring ==
On 16–20 September 2019, The UK Fact Finding Mission (FFM) among other sources identified rapid dismantling and purging of the security sector without proper new system. The senior representatives of OFC noted that "You have a sense across the board that there is a new system and regime but there are a lot of errors within this as forces act how they want. The old systems have been dissected/removed, but a new one has not been put in place, it means security/police do not have a mandate on how they can act". The FFM considered "Abiy dismantled the authoritarian structures too quickly. The first sector was the security sector, which is one of the most complicated sectors to break down and reform. Abiy knows whoever is in charge of the intelligence is in the ruling party so he tried to restructure this sector to get rid of the TPLF, but Abiy didn’t replace it with a new reform [sic, system/structure] which caused issues at the regional level."
