= General José Trinidad Cabañas National Police Academy of Honduras =

Police academy in La Paz, Honduras

- Academia Nacional de Policía de Honduras General José Trinidad Cabañas
- Other names: Anapo
- Motto: Fiat justitia et pereat mundus
- Motto in English: Let Justice be Done and Let the World Perish
- Type: Police academy
- Established: January 2, 1976
- Location: La Paz, Honduras
- Colors: White, blue and gold

The General José Trinidad Cabañas National Police Academy of Honduras (Spanish: Academia Nacional de Policía de Honduras General José Trinidad Cabañas) is a police academy in La Paz, Honduras. Its aim is to provide the necessary education to aspiring police officers of the National Police of Honduras and to ensure existing officers' knowledge remains updated.

== History ==
The creation of the police academy was approved in 1975, and it was named after former Honduran president José Trinidad Cabañas as a symbol of service to the country. The academy opened its doors to men only the following year, and started allowing women the year following that. By 1985, the academy was consolidated as the professional training center for Honduran police and was further modernized in 2015 when security minister Julián Pacheco announced the academy would become bilingual. It was also equipped with laboratories for future forensic technical police officers.

== Admissions ==
Students are required to be Honduran by birth, have a high school diploma, meet a certain height qualification and be between eighteen and twenty-three years of age. They must be single with no children, which must not change throughout their time at the academy. Piercings are not recommended. Students must pass background checks, as well as medical, physical, and psychometric exams. One year, more than 1,000 students took the admission exam for the academy, but only 210 of them actually passed due to the rigorousness of the exam, according to then-director Leonel Sauceda. Sauceda also indicated there would be other types tests involved in training, such as polygraphs. There are also confidence tests in the examination process.

== Study program ==
If admitted, training at the academy lasts for four years. Students there receive training on subjects such as criminology, investigation, ethics and more.

First through third year students are referred to as cadets, and fourth years are given the rank of police ensigns.

== See also ==
- Armed Forces of Honduras
- History of military schools in Honduras
- Honduras Secretariat for Security
