= Police College (Qatar) =

Security college in Doha, Qatar

- Established: December 2013
- Head: Brig. Dr. Mohammed Abdullah Talib Al-Mahanna Al-Marri
- Location: Doha, Qatar
- Website: http://www.moi.gov.qa/policecollege/

Police College (Qatar) is a security college that works under the Ministry of Interior (Qatar), and it was established as per the Emiri Decree No. 161 of 2013, issued by Sheikh Tamim bin Hamad Al Thani, the Emir. The College is supervised by a Supreme Council that consists of 10 members representing the different authorities inside and outside the ministry.

The first batch of students was enrolled at the College on Saturday, 16 August 2014 for the academic year 2014–2015. They were 130 students from the State of Qatar and other the Arab states. A budget of QR 2.5 bn was allotted to the college in its first year. The second batch of candidate students were received on 5 October 2015.

== Supreme Council of the College ==
As per the Ministerial Decree No. 19/2014 issued on 28 February 2014, the Supreme Council of Police College consists of

1. H.E Sheikh Abdullah bin Nasser bin Khalifa Al Thani – Minister of Interior as Chairman
2. Maj. Gen. Dr. Abdullah Yousuf Al-Maal – Legal Adviser of Minister of Interior as Vice Chairman
3. Brig. Dr. Mohammed Abdullah Talib Al-Mahanna Al-Marri – Director General of Police College as a Member
4. Brig. Mahdi Mtlaq Al-Qahtani – Director of Training and Courses at Lekhwiya as a Member
5. Brig. Badr Ibrahim Ghanem, Director of Technical Office of the Minister of Interior as a Member and Rapporteur.
6. Col. Abdul Rahman Majid Al-Sulaiti – Director of Strategic Planning Department at Ministry of Interior as a Member
7. Dr. Mohammed Abdul Azeez Al-Khulaifi – Dean of Law College at Qatar University as a Member.
8. Dr. Khaled Mohammed Al-Harr as a Member
9. Dr. Yousuf Mohammed Obaidan Fakhroo as a Member
10. Dr. Ahmed Hassan Al-Hammadi as a Member

The validity of the council is 4 years as per the Ministerial Decree and it can be extended for the same duration once or more.

== Study Programs ==
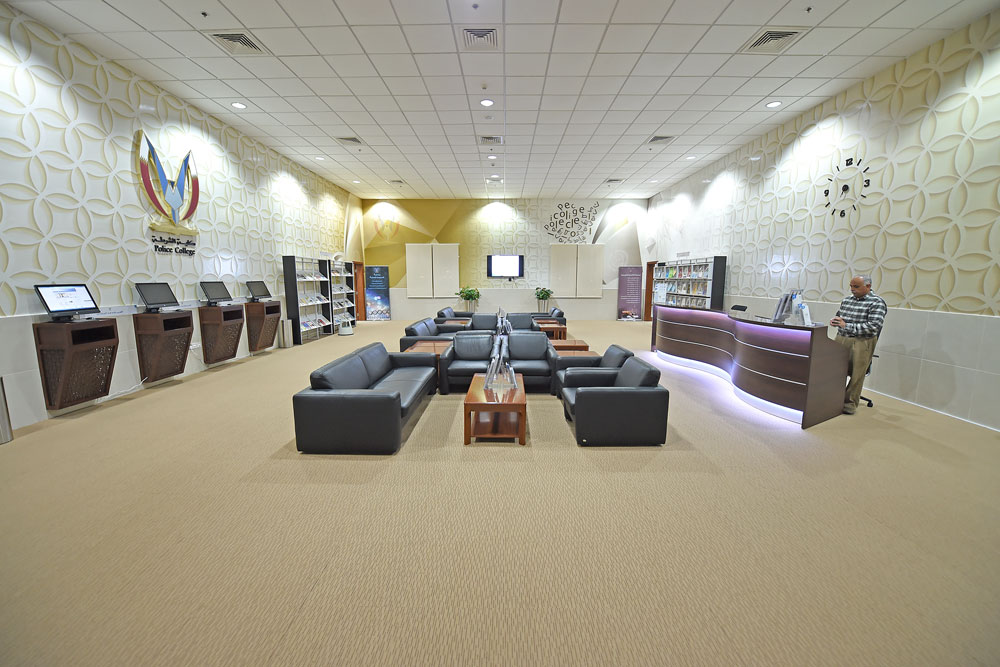
Qatar Police College Library

The college offers a bachelor's degree in law and police science in Arabic medium. The duration of study is four years, divided into semesters each lasting 16 weeks.

== Buildings of the College ==
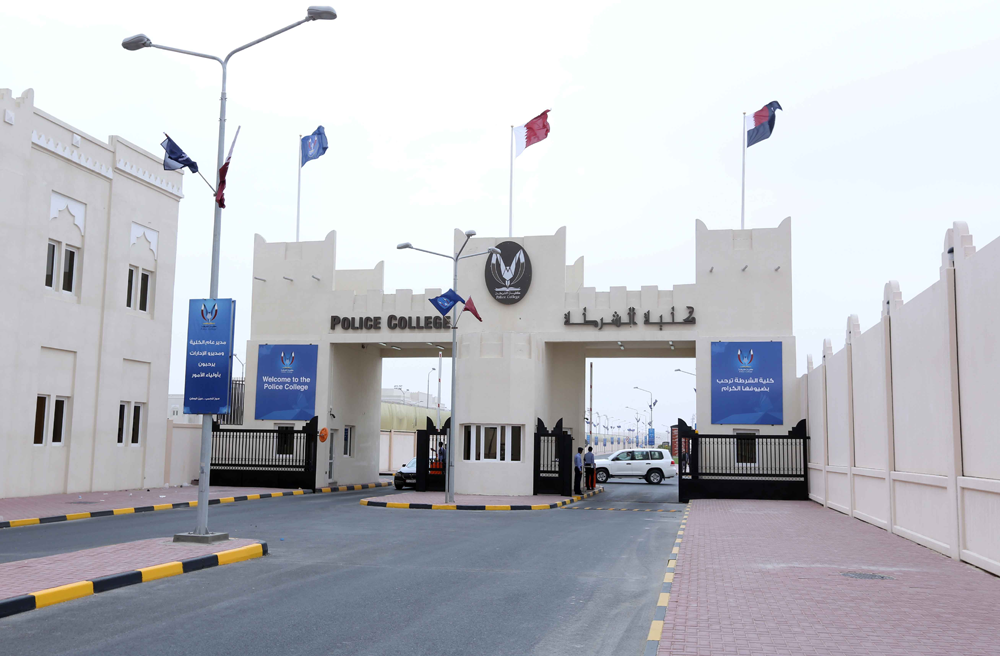
Main Entrance of the police college in Qatar

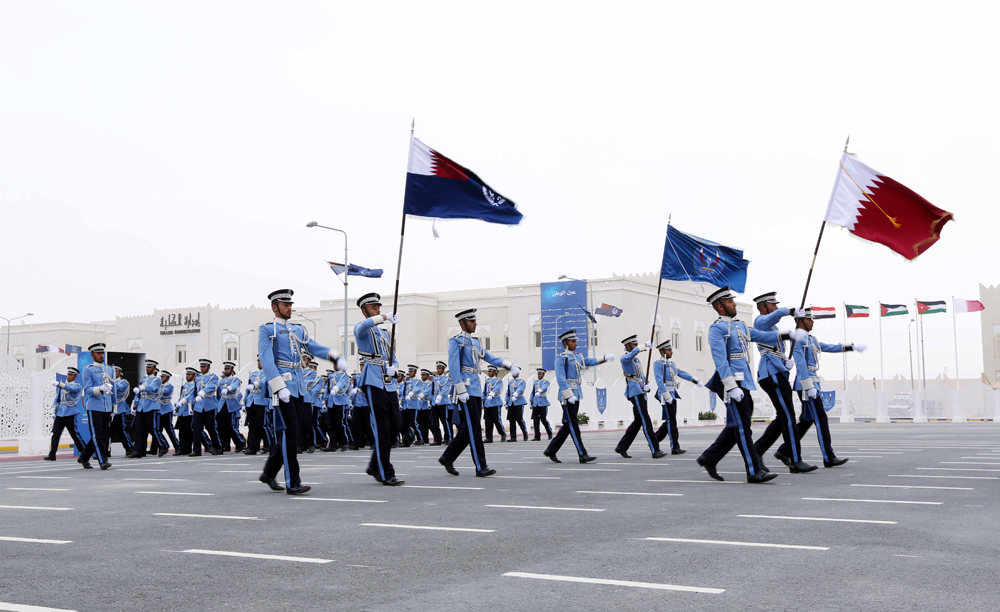
A Parade by students of Police College in Qatar

The College consists of following buildings:

- Administration Building
- Languages and Information Systems Building
- Academic Building
- College Library
- Sports Complex
- Olympic Complex
- Students Hostel
- Medical Clinic
- Training Fields
