= Ethiopian Police University College =

Public institution of higher education in Ethiopia

- የኢትዮጵያ ፖሊስ ዩኒቨርሲቲ ኮሌጅ
- Former name: Aba Dina Police College
- Type: Public
- Established: 1946
- President: Deputy Commissioner General Mesfin Abebe
- Vice-president: Deputy Commissioner Daniel Birhanu
- Students: over 800 (from 1970s onwards)
- Postgraduates: 3,951 (1990)
- Location: Sendafa, Oromia Region, Ethiopia
- Colors: Dark blue

The Ethiopian Police University College (Amharic: የኢትዮጵያ ፖሊስ ዩኒቨርሲቲ ኮሌጅ), formerly called Aba Dina Police College, is a public institution of higher education in Ethiopia dedicated to training police officers. Its main campus is located in Sendafa, a town 38 kilometers north of Addis Ababa.

== History ==
The college, Aba Dina police College, opened in 1946, staffed by Swedish instructors, although since 1960 the faculty has consisted entirely of Ethiopians who were police college graduates. Candidates for the two-year course had to have a secondary school education or its equivalent. The two-year program was phased out later and replaced by a three years training by taking candidates who were High school graduates with 'C' average in ESLC (college ready) or college dropouts and incorporating college academic courses taught by lecturers and professors from the then HSI University. Officers usually were commissioned after completion of a cadet course and a selected few going to universities and colleges to further their education and graduate with degrees in Health, Law engineering. Israel, The US police academy and other countries were represented as advisors at different point and many of the graduates were also awarded scholarship to study abroad. After the Derg took power, the government increased enrollment to bring new blood into the national police; from 1974 to 1979, about 800 graduates received commissions as second lieutenants.

Instruction at the college includes general courses in police science, criminal law, tactics, traffic control, sociology, criminology, physical education, and first aid. Practical training was offered midway in the program and sometimes entailed field service in troubled areas. Those cadets who had passed their final examinations with distinction were selected for further specialized training. The police college also offers short-term courses and refresher training for service officers. By the end of 1990, the police college had graduated a total of 3,951 officer cadets in the years since its establishment in 1946.
