= Central Revolutionary Investigation Department =

Secret police in Ethiopia (1978–1991)

Central Revolutionary Investigation Department ማዕከላዊ አብዮታዊ ምርመራ መምሪያ
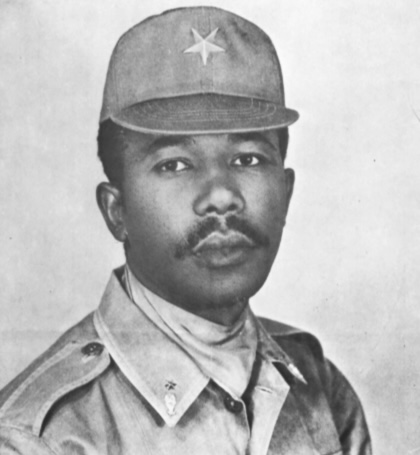
- Image of dictator Mengistu Haile Mariam, who ordered to create CRID

Agency overview
- Formed: 1978
- Dissolved: 1991

Jurisdictional structure
- National agency: Ethiopia
- Operations jurisdiction: Ethiopia
- General nature: Secret police

Operational structure
- Headquarters: Addis Ababa, Ethiopia
- Agency executive: Colonel Tesfaye Woldesilassie

The Central Revolutionary Investigation Department (CRID), (Note: Amharic: ማዕከላዊ አብዮታዊ ምርመራ መምሪያ, romanized: Ma’kälawi Äbyotawi Mermära Mämariya) also known as the Third Police Station, was the secret police and internal intelligence service in Ethiopia from 1978 to 1991 during the Derg regime and later the PDRE era.

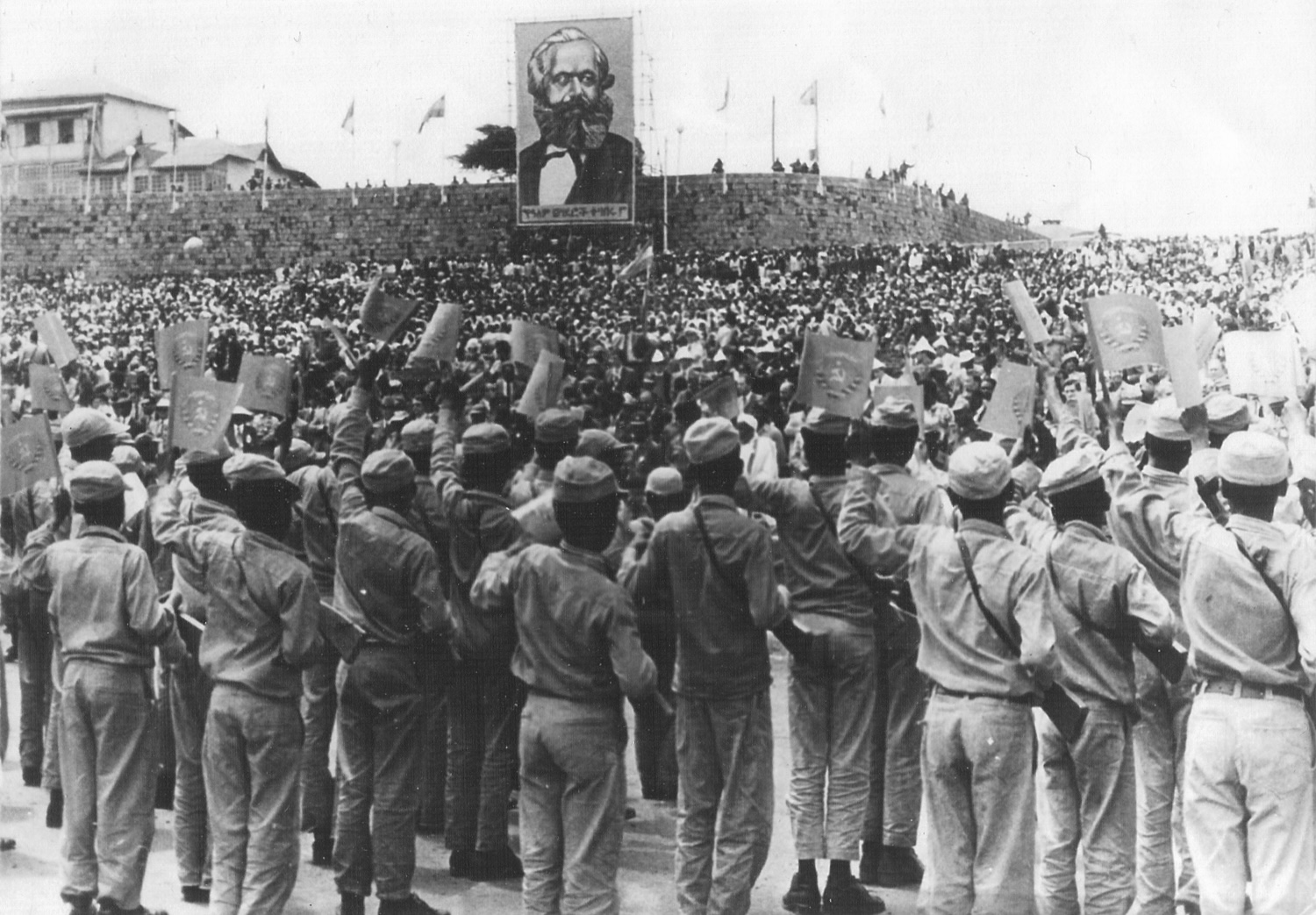
Ethiopian army soldiers rally in support of the Derg, many of them holding communist manifestos.

The Derg seized power in Ethiopia in 1974 amid a general revolution against Emperor Haile Selassie. The military junta immediately began to purge the state of the emperor's supporters and political opponents and formed a new secret police and intelligence agency. Soon, the Derg regime carried out a bloody military campaign to suppress its opponents, known as the Red Terror, which killed an estimated 980,000 people in under two years. If Red Terror was stopped in 1978, however, repressions was not: in August of the same year CRID was founded. CRID was responsible for suppressing dissent and identifying targets for state repression in Ethiopia. Department also has been monitoring opposition in government-controlled areas and regime dissidents. It is considered to be the most advanced institution of violence in Derg's Ethiopia. CRID also known as the "third police station".

The CRID was disbanded in 1991 following the fall of the Derg regime due to a series of offensives by a coalition of opposition forces.

== See also ==
- National Intelligence and Security Service (Ethiopia)
