= Parliamentary opposition in Ethiopia =

In 1995, Ethiopia's politics became a multi-party system allowing opposition political groups.

== Criticisms ==
Many opposition parties were skeptical of government transition programs. Those parties were often accused of benefiting the ruling party. According to commentators, the basic shortcoming among majority parties is lack of institutional capacity and clear ideological foundations as well as poor organization. Another criticism is that those parties failed to cooperate with each other, and underrepresented their representative societies.

== List of opposition political parties ==
=== EPRDF regime ===
The EPRDF coalition was dominated predominately by TPLF, establishing ethno-nationalist political parties under it. Majority parties include the Oromo Democratic Party (ODP), Amhara Democratic Party (ADP) and Southern Ethiopian People's Democratic Movement (SEPDM). Opposition groups during that era often faced marginalization and negligence by the ruling party TPLF. In addition, human rights abuses were alleged, including arbitrary arrests, torture, and suppression of dissent as well as lack of free and fair elections.

Name	Formed	Type
Oromo Liberation Front	1973	Regional
Ogaden National Liberation Front	1984	Regional
All Ethiopian Unity Party	2002	National
Unity for Democracy and Justice	2008	National
Ethiopian Federal Democratic Unity Forum	2008	National
Semayawi Party	2002	National
Ethiopian Democratic Party	1999	National
Arena Tigray for Democracy and Sovereignty	2000	Regional
Ethiopian Social Democratic Party	1998	National

=== Prosperity Party regime ===
Name	Formed	Type
Balderas Party	2019	National
Ethiopian Citizens for Social Justice	2019	National
National Movement of Amhara	2018	Regional
Freedom and Equality Party	2019	National
Enat Party	2019	National
Gedeo People's Democratic Party	1992	Regional
