= 2021 Ethiopian general election =

- 21 June 2021 (most regions); 30 September 2021 (Harari, SNNPR, and Somali)
- 473 of the 547 seats in the House of Peoples' Representatives; 274 seats needed for a majority
- Turnout: 89.07%
Party	Leader	Vote %	Seats	+/–
Prosperity	Abiy Ahmed	89.18	457	−43
EZEMA	Berhanu Nega	2.99	4	New
NaMA	Belete Molla	1.96	5	New
Gedeo People's		0.33	2	+2
Kucha People's Democratic		0.07	1	+1
Independents	—	1.77	4	+4
This lists parties that won seats. See the complete results below.
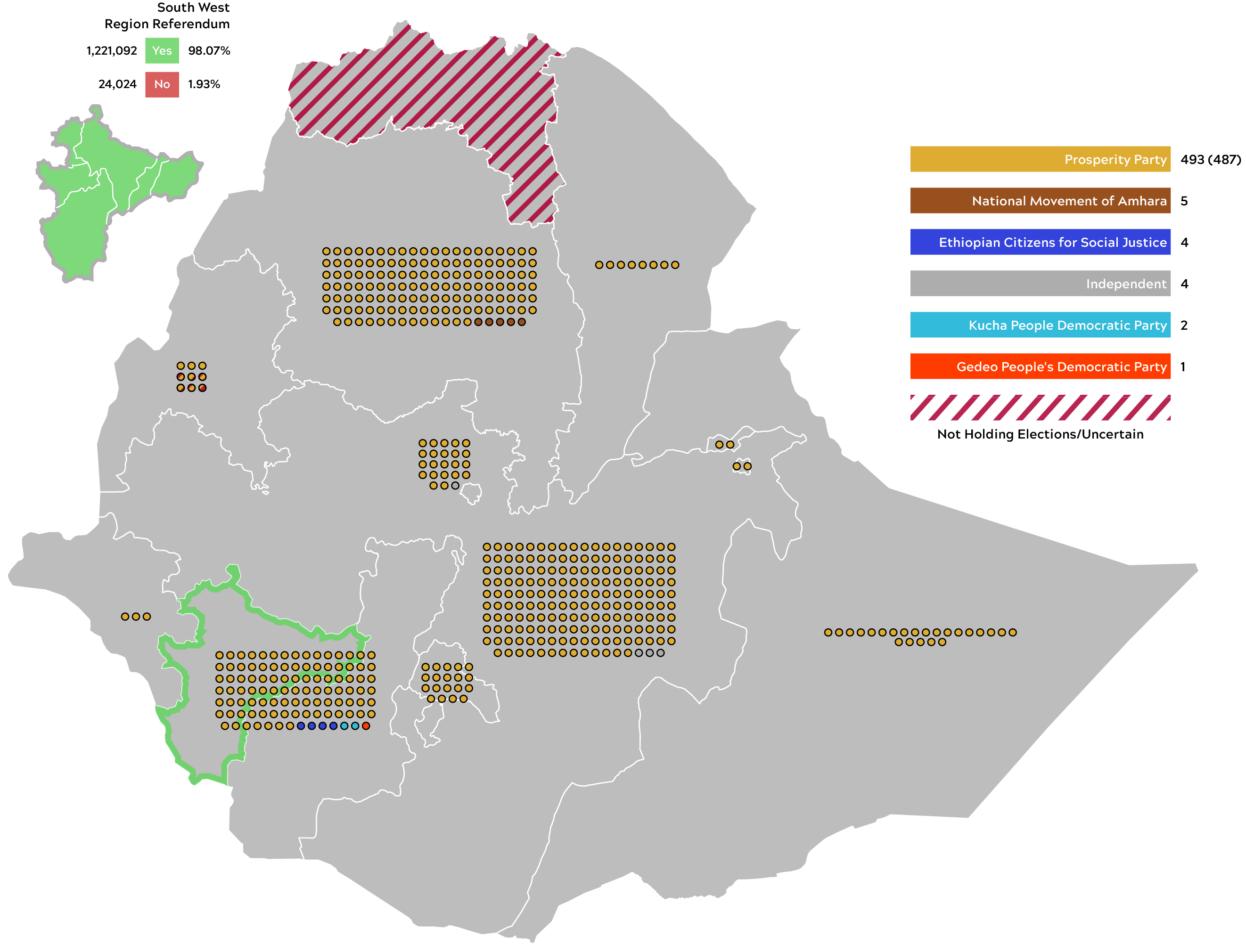
Prime Minister before	Prime Minister after
Abiy Ahmed; Prosperity Party	Abiy Ahmed; Prosperity Party

General elections were held in Ethiopia on 21 June and 30 September 2021 to elect members of the House of Peoples' Representatives. Regional elections were also held on those dates.

The elections were initially scheduled for 29 August 2020, but it was delayed due to the COVID-19 pandemic. Regional and municipal council elections were also planned to be held at the same time. In May 2020, the sitting House of Peoples' Representatives voted to postpone the election until 2021. In late December 2020, the National Election Board of Ethiopia (NEBE) said the election would take place on 5 June 2021, before it was further delayed until 21 June. It was the first multi-party election in Ethiopia since the 2005 election.

The Ethiopian People's Revolutionary Democratic Front (EPRDF), the political coalition that had dominated Ethiopian politics since the overthrow of the Derg regime in 1991, was dissolved on 1 December 2019. Three of its four-member parties, the Amhara Democratic Party (ADP), Oromo Democratic Party (ODP) and Southern Ethiopian People's Democratic Movement (SEPDM), merged to form the Prosperity Party, which inherited the EPRDF's role as the governing party. The last leader of the EPRDF, Prime Minister Abiy Ahmed, became the new party's first leader.

Bekele Gerba and Jawar Mohammed, members of the Oromo Federalist Congress (OFC), were imprisoned on 30 June 2020, following a crackdown by the government after the murder of Hachalu Hundessa. On 19 September 2020, both were charged with terrorism. Jawar denied the charges and claimed the arrests were politically motivated. The OFC and the Oromo Liberation Front were planning to participate in the election but withdrew, claiming that the results would be rigged under the Prime Minister.

The election was a landslide victory for the Prosperity Party. On 30 September 2021, voting took place in 47 constituencies of the Harari, SNNPR, and Somali regions. The House of Peoples' Representatives confirmed incumbent Abiy Ahmed as prime minister for a five-year term on 4 October 2021. The African Union described the election as an improvement compared to the 2015 election and positively overall, urging the government to continue the commitment to democracy.

== Electoral system ==
The 547 members of the House of Peoples' Representatives (the lower chamber of parliament) were elected in single-member constituencies using the first-past-the-post system.

Region	Total seats	Elected on 21 June 2021	Elected on 30 September 2021	Elected on 23 June 2024	Cancelled
Addis Ababa	23	23	—	—	—
Afar	8	6	—	2	—
Amhara	138	119	—	—	19
Benishangul-Gumuz	9	3	—	6	—
Dire Dawa	2	2	—	—	—
Gambela	3	3	—	—	—
Harari	2	—	2	—	—
Oromia	178	170	—	—	8
SNNPR	104	81	22	1	—
Sidama	19	19	—	—	—
Somali	23	—	23	—	—
Tigray	38	—	—	—	38
Total	547	426	47	9	65

== Background ==
=== Wollo, Amhara Region ===
A conflict between Oromo residents and Amhara Special Forces started in January 2021. According to Hassan Hadiya, a resident of Kemise, it started after Amhara Special Forces killed a person at the entrance of the grand mosque in Ataye, in the Oromia Zone of the Amhara Region. Another resident of Kemise, stated that the Amhara Liyu police were attacking civilians. Eyewitnesses blamed the regional Amhara Special Forces while the Amhara regional government accused both the OLF-Shene and TPLF of the violence. Two members of the Ethiopian parliament accused Amhara Liyu police of killing an Oromo civilian in Ataye, saying: "Amhara Militia used OLF-Shane as a pretext to commit war crime on Oromo farmers in Wollo for the three major reasons the MP said on 11th Session of parliament of Ethiopia. The reasons are: (1) their national identity (being an Oromo), (2) their religious identity (being Muslim), and (3) use the atrocity as a bargaining threat to fulfill all their demands in Oromia region." With regard to the attack of Wallo Oromos in the Oromia Zone by Amhara militia in March 2021, the OPP and APP issued opposing statements, each blaming the other ethnic group for causing the violence and killings. The Borkena news website and an Amhara Region official claimed that the OLF targeted Ataye.

=== Shashemene massacre ===
Shashamane, a town south of Addis Ababa, was the scene of a pogrom massacre that targeted Orthodox Christians, ethnic Amharas, Gurages and other non-Oromos. The violence was triggered by the murder of singer Hachalu Hundessa in a Galan condominium. An umbrella humanitarian organization, OTAGE, has engaged a legal firm, specialising in international crimes, to bring those responsible to justice.

=== Tigray War ===
The Tigray People's Liberation Front (TPLF), the dominant component of the EPRDF, was the only constituent party that had not merged into the Prosperity Party. In September 2020, the Tigray Region held a regional election that the Prosperity Party-led government deemed illegal.

On 4 November, Tigray regional security forces attacked the headquarters of the Northern Command of the Ethiopian National Defense Force (ENDF), leading to armed conflict in the between the government and the Tigray region. In late 2020, the Tigray Region government was replaced by the Transitional Government of Tigray. TPLF was then dissolved by NEBE. There have been reports of war crimes committed against civilians since the breakout of the war.

== Parties and coalitions ==
Party	Main ideologies	Political position	Leader
Prosperity Party	Liberalism; Multiculturalism; Civic nationalism	Centre	Abiy Ahmed
National Movement of Amhara	Amhara ethnic nationalism	Right-wing	Belete Molla
Ethiopian Citizens for Social Justice	Liberalism; Federalism; Multiculturalism; Civic nationalism Ethiopian nationalism	Centre	Berhanu Nega
Medrek	Social democracy Ethnic federalism Ethnic nationalism	Centre-left	Merera Gudina
Ogaden National Liberation Front	Somali ethnic nationalism	Centre-left	Mohammed Omar Osman
All Ethiopian Unity Party	Ethnic federalism	Centre-right	Mamushet Amare
Balderas Party	Conservative liberalism Addis Ababa localism	Centre-left	Eskinder Nega
Freedom and Equality Party	Liberalism; Federalism; Multiculturalism; Civic nationalism Ethiopian nationalism	Centre	Abdulkadir Adem

== Delays ==
In addition to the Tigray War, there have also been reports of delays in both constituencies and entire regions due to security concerns and logistics.

=== Constituencies ===
On 22 May, the NEBE announced that 40 constituencies in six regions would not hold elections on the same day, but later. According to the Board, this was from a lack of voter registration, logistical issues, and security problems in many constituencies.

=== Regions ===
On 6 June, the NEBE stated that due to irregularities in printing ballot papers, the election in the Harari Region and the Somali Region would be held in a second round on 6 September. This also came when the board announced voting would not take place in the war-torn Tigray Region. Combined, these regions constitute 63 out of 547 seats. In August, the voting date was moved once again to 30 September 2021.

== Results ==
On 10 July, partial election results were released with the Prosperity Party winning at least 410 seats, well enough to secure the majority and remain in power. The National Movement of Amhara won 5 seats, Ethiopian Citizens For Social Justice Party won 4 seats, Gedeo People's Democratic Party won 2 seats, and 1 seat went to an independent candidate. On 30 September 2021, the elections took place in 47 constituencies which had been delayed. Results from those constituencies were announced on 2 November 2021. On 4 October 2021, the House of Peoples' Representatives confirmed incumbent Abiy Ahmed as prime minister for a five-year term.

Party	Votes	%	Seats
Prosperity Party	30,018,782	89.18	457
Ethiopian Citizens for Social Justice	1,007,136	2.99	4
National Movement of Amhara	658,579	1.96	5
Enat Party	259,888	0.77	0
Balderas Party	228,187	0.68	0
Freedom and Equality Party	123,278	0.37	0
All Ethiopia Unity Organization	119,036	0.35	0
Ethiopian Social Democratic Party	114,364	0.34	0
Gedeo People's Democratic Party	111,078	0.33	2
Hibir Ethiopia Democratic Party	49,168	0.15	0
Amhara Democratic Power Movement	39,460	0.12	0
New Generation Party	30,781	0.09	0
Afar People's Party	28,605	0.08	0
Kucha People's Democratic Party	24,192	0.07	1
Ethiopian People's Revolutionary Party	21,870	0.06	0
Wolaita People's Democratic Front	20,434	0.06	0
Agew National Congress	17,927	0.05	0
Gambela People's Liberation Movement	17,718	0.05	0
Ethiopian Democratic Union	16,174	0.05	0
Gamo Democratic Party	14,677	0.04	0
Afar Revolutionary Democratic Unity Front	11,029	0.03	0
Afar Liberation Front	11,015	0.03	0
Renaissance Party	10,624	0.03	0
People's Liberation Movement	10,072	0.03	0
Kimant Democratic Party	9,675	0.03	0
Sidama People's Unity Democratic Organization	8,782	0.03	0
Sidama Unity Party	8,310	0.02	0
Mocha Democratic Party	7,962	0.02	0
Ethiopian Independence Party	7,919	0.02	0
Oromo Liberation Movement	7,393	0.02	0
Medrek	6,363	0.02	0
Wolaita National Movement	6,313	0.02	0
Gambela People's Liberation Democratic Movement	5,736	0.02	0
Ogaden National Liberation Front	5,634	0.02	0
Kaffa People's Democratic Union	4,758	0.01	0
Kaffa Green Party	4,694	0.01	0
Raya Rayuma Democratic Party	4,205	0.01	0
Benshangul People's Freedom Movement	2,789	0.01	0
Wolene People's Democratic Party	2,579	0.01	0
Argoba Nationality Democratic Movement	2,546	0.01	0
Donga People's Democratic Organization	2,114	0.01	0
Ethiopian National Unity Party	1,646	0.00	0
Harari Democratic Organization	258	0.00	0
Western Somali Democratic Party	68	0.00	0
Independent	596,314	1.77	4
Vacant			74
Total	33,660,132	100.00	547
Valid votes	33,660,132	95.92	
Invalid/blank votes	1,430,371	4.08	
Total votes	35,090,503	100.00	
Registered voters/turnout	39,395,768	89.07	

=== By constituencies ===
21 June 2021 and 30 September 2021 elections results by constituency
Region	Date	Constituency	PP	ECSJ	NMA	EP	BP	FEP	AEUO	ESDP	GPDP	HEDP	ADPM	NGP	APP	KPDP	EPRP	WPDF	ANC	GPLM	EDU	GDP	ARDUF	ALF	RP	PLM	KDP	SPUDO	SUP	MDP	EIP	OLM	EFDUF	WNM	GPLDM	ONLF	KPDU	KGP	RRDP	BPFM	WPDP	ANDM	DPDO	ENUP	HDO	WSDP	Ind	Invalid	Electorate
Addis Ababa	21 June 2021	Constituency 1 and 9	25,241	6,121		752	6,868	987	212	300		623		131							212				160																							2,215	52,742
Addis Ababa	21 June 2021	Constituency 2 and 14	14,181	3,677		513	3,794	448	89	512		450		62											100														253									1,321	30,501
Addis Ababa	21 June 2021	Constituency 3	15,963	3,086		348	2,859	464	99			100		34											204							137							46									1,445	29,519
Addis Ababa	21 June 2021	Constituency 4	15,385	5,010		900	3,082	648	178			122					664																															1,321	30,583
Addis Ababa	21 June 2021	Constituency 5	13,542	5,605		418	1,783	1,235	274			190					478																															1,192	29,252
Addis Ababa	21 June 2021	Constituency 6	15,892	7,659		783	1,848	671	140			216					169															122																1,400	34,526
Addis Ababa	21 June 2021	Constituency 7	19,272	5,804		620	3,586	1,637	486			337																																150				1,808	39,768
Addis Ababa	21 June 2021	Constituency 8	25,314	5,224		808	5,043	1,483	319			509													211																							2,235	47,439
Addis Ababa	21 June 2021	Constituency 10	21,147	6,708		800	10,105	795	239	605		340													464														842									2,243	52,561
Addis Ababa	21 June 2021	Constituency 11	25,660	8,435		1,370	9,991	718	281	326		141		262			334								292																							3,101	59,678
Addis Ababa	21 June 2021	Constituency 12 and 13	36,756	11,858		1,535	14,438	331	693			1,499		317											1,036																							2,975	84,313
Addis Ababa	21 June 2021	Constituency 15	15,570	4,090		828	5,238	265				146					520								141																							1,550	31,980
Addis Ababa	21 June 2021	Constituency 16	17,267	5,721		750	7,043	336	326			594		174																									610									2,056	43,756
Addis Ababa	21 June 2021	Constituency 17	88,038	21,548		3,957	25,730	2,554	1,224	1,610		2,552		738			1,038								895														536									12,482	199,882
Addis Ababa	21 June 2021	Constituency 18	14,983	3,440		503	3,876	208		173		123		211											116						65	193																1,350	29,521
Addis Ababa	21 June 2021	Constituency 19	94,272	19,645		2,525	27,403	2,415		1,874		2,172		2,010			2,344								1,261														778								1,567	8,345	206,540
Addis Ababa	21 June 2021	Constituency 20	29,859	5,791		1,531	7,531	941	799	429		227													203														153									2,553	59,265
Addis Ababa	21 June 2021	Constituency 21 and 22	27,099	6,513		1,598	7,162	573		1,348		352		284																																		2,505	55,152
Addis Ababa	21 June 2021	Constituency 23	31,278	14,114		974	10,185	2,343				340		156							1,178				625														359					433				2,889	81,600
Addis Ababa	21 June 2021	Constituency 24	81,913	26,360		2,517	18,403	8,056	601	4,875		696		1,817											818																							9,137	179,804
Addis Ababa	21 June 2021	Constituency 25	41,120	16,750		1,169	6,157	2,590	451			448																																				3,337	82,929
Addis Ababa	21 June 2021	Constituency 26 and 27	90,416	11,418		2,460	16,314	1,490	1,121	4,562		629													878														628									8,622	162,767
Addis Ababa	21 June 2021	Constituency 28		24,361		2,301	29,748	4,471				6,116		1,775			2,044				2,359				3,220																						51,760	13,297	176,741
Afar	21 June 2021	Abala	366,268												9,469								5,695										3,717															5,484	415,285
Afar	21 June 2021	Amibara	88,487	183											795								188																									4,691	120,304
Afar	21 June 2021	Asayita	185,278	4,225										181	3,945								2,404	4,001									223														31,560	1,272	365,705
Afar	21 June 2021	Awash Fentale	68,403	574											1,814								314	204																		348						1,964	90,235
Afar	21 June 2021	Dubti	229,194	556											9,717								1,597	5,055									2,423															1,173	381,935
Afar	21 June 2021	Gulina	248,204	9											2,865								831	1,755																								997	275,836
Amhara	21 June 2021	Addis Kidam	24,850	1,168	2,648	731			768										551																													3,259	44,468
Amhara	21 June 2021	Albuko	27,431	256				192																																								960	29,206
Amhara	21 June 2021	Alefa Takusa 1	16,577	2,382	3,361	1,548						1,089																																				4,920	51,347
Amhara	21 June 2021	Alefa Takusa 2	33,605	1,945	2,730	937			542								1,335				975																											4,020	68,228
Amhara	21 June 2021	Alem Ketema	23,793	2,416	7,179	1,384																																										7,437	51,711
Amhara	21 June 2021	Amanuel	11,211	1,364	4,797				1,157																																							3,314	32,503
Amhara	21 June 2021	Amber	13,460	2,062	5,515	1,451			1,764				1,005																																			6,571	46,789
Amhara	21 June 2021	Arerete	20,342	2,580	5,974	2,962			2,359																																	1,807						4,869	54,609
Amhara	21 June 2021	Bahir Dar Ketema	35,133	5,612	47,483	8,152		994	2,598			1,041	2,140																		1,139																	7,521	137,084
Amhara	21 June 2021	Belesa	36,817	2,864	9,357	2,768							869																																			7,871	89,646
Amhara	21 June 2021	Bichena	15,138	3,484	13,231	1,562			1,677																																							9,067	63,346
Amhara	21 June 2021	Bugna	44,124	937	9,371	3,826			2,597			1,210	2,639						1,115																												8,749	12,586	103,661
Amhara	21 June 2021	Bure	14,828	2,046	10,168	2,748			1,143			792																																				6,533	54,662
Amhara	21 June 2021	Chacha	31,815	4,475	3,716	2,786			1,440																																						1,271	4,545	56,253
Amhara	21 June 2021	Chagni	35,316	1,703	669	956		508	389										1,669																													3,127	49,071
Amhara	21 June 2021	Chefa Robit	84,927	73	64																																											201	86,199
Amhara	21 June 2021	Dabat	28,785	1,609	3,137	1,606			404				775																																		977	2,700	60,798
Amhara	21 June 2021	Dangila	21,904	927	4,680	832			559										915												482																	3,453	42,646
Amhara	21 June 2021	Dawa Chefa	108,229		1,097			1,094																																								1,882	113,704
Amhara	21 June 2021	Debark	94,088	2,008	7,109	1,183		777	1,519			641	578																																			4,538	141,451
Amhara	21 June 2021	Debre Birhan	26,183	4,281	16,377	3,886			1,104			1,208																																				6,884	73,778
Amhara	21 June 2021	Debre Elias	6,793	2,164	4,168	1,325			516				1,085																																			3,454	29,385
Amhara	21 June 2021	Debre Markos	15,082	1,447	14,653	1,632			492			851	420																																			4,627	49,608
Amhara	21 June 2021	Debre Werq	19,733	3,271	11,452				1,972				2,790																																			12,829	69,892
Amhara	21 June 2021	Debresina	23,030	2,883	7,755	1,231			1,761																																							5,263	51,978
Amhara	21 June 2021	Debresina 1	39,066	1,908	5,153	3,012		1,596	1,634																																						978	8,460	74,428
Amhara	21 June 2021	Debresina 2	41,389	1,667	2,495	1,142		645	1,026								438																															8,184	65,521
Amhara	21 June 2021	Dega Damot	19,986	750	4,678	564			303																																							2,063	44,609
Amhara	21 June 2021	Degwa Tsiyon	13,106	2,164	5,490	751							905																																			4,415	34,560
Amhara	21 June 2021	Dehana	52,453	1,555	1,147	807													986																													3,256	68,132
Amhara	21 June 2021	Dejen	14,791	1,368	7,933	1,475			1,154				1,070																																			5,233	41,595
Amhara	21 June 2021	Delanta	35,528	3,635	7,574	3,068			2,797																																							17,539	82,431
Amhara	21 June 2021	Dembecha	14,386	1,921	6,799	1,754			1,051																																							3,354	41,015
Amhara	21 June 2021	Dembia 1	30,684	608	5,050	1,174			1,104				540						956								517																					4,438	69,221
Amhara	21 June 2021	Deneba	22,381	2,332	3,770	3,169			508					500							1,200																											5,895	46,062
Amhara	21 June 2021	Dera 1	24,412	2,030	6,961	1,720			908																																							1,650	54,562
Amhara	21 June 2021	Dera 2	12,582	1,823	3,737	922			718																																							1,498	59,742
Amhara	21 June 2021	Dese Ketema	44,919	2,836	6,886	5,300		3,112	460			468		876			996														470													636				5,049	82,177
Amhara	21 June 2021	Dili Yibiza	58,016	1,862	3,437	1,543																																										3,857	37,919
Amhara	21 June 2021	Dise Zuria 1	31,919	627	898			357	295																																							2,189	64,746
Amhara	21 June 2021	Dise Zuria 2	54,294	1,039	1,206			1,165																																								4,837	77,243
Amhara	21 June 2021	Durbete	17,307	1,342	5,153	1,222			426			725					511														883																	3,516	55,225
Amhara	21 June 2021	Ebnat 1	22,528	1,612	3,378	1,489		466	853																																							3,436	50,228
Amhara	21 June 2021	Ebnat 2	19,681	1,775	3,498	2,288																																										4,430	42,774
Amhara	21 June 2021	Enewari	14,783	1,784	3,428	1,343			564																																							2,677	33,190
Amhara	21 June 2021	Erob Gebeya	12,074	871	2,923	682			510																																							3,125	30,261
Amhara	21 June 2021	Esite 1	18,459	1,706	4,112	3,585			1,130																																							4,051	49,766
Amhara	21 June 2021	Esite 2	8,528	2,037	5,768	4,419			1,510																																							4,892	45,881
Amhara	21 June 2021	Farta 1	20,890	1,927	7,167	4,881			775				1,376																																			4,588	55,610
Amhara	21 June 2021	Farta 2	19,228	1,245	2,749	983			1,010				744																																			2,691	38,642
Amhara	21 June 2021	Farta 3	9,442	1,745	3,296	1,702			839				476																																			2,649	31,337
Amhara	21 June 2021	Finote Selam	12,133	1,841	10,284	1,799						713	1,122																																			5,257	47,244
Amhara	21 June 2021	Fogera 1	25,293	1,528	5,969	3,367			560			1,129	950																																			4,640	68,694
Amhara	21 June 2021	Fogera 2	14,226	1,898	4,646	2,650			1,240				858																																			3,742	50,026
Amhara	21 June 2021	Gerchech	12,747	1,867	5,600	1,271			703				1,120																																			3,584	45,685
Amhara	21 June 2021	Gidan	30,273	2,526	6,629	2,778																																									2,417	8,827	65,864
Amhara	21 June 2021	Gimja Bet	61,633	2,760	3,271	2,192													1,306																													6,032	91,613
Amhara	21 June 2021	Ginde Weyin	17,843	2,573	9,408				1,252				2,042																																			7,247	59,449
Amhara	21 June 2021	Gondar Ketema 1	24,035	2,122	5,173	5,117		1,263	522			976	632				365		412		701						2,066																					4,580	62,293
Amhara	21 June 2021	Gondar Ketema 2	31,265	2,523	10,779	6,388		217	520			441	734				795		1,477								2,005																					15,133	94,518
Amhara	21 June 2021	Gondar Zuria 3	12,744	2,432	6,521	1,678			1,983				1,305																																			6,444	48,794
Amhara	21 June 2021	Gondar Zuria 4	7,183	1,397	2,719	1,300			563				879																																			3,652	27,292
Amhara	21 June 2021	Gonj	11,121	1,201	9,665	1,479			805			1,000	993																																			5,886	51,760
Amhara	21 June 2021	Gozamin	6,430	1,032	4,191	980			793				923																																			4,220	30,097
Amhara	21 June 2021	Gubalafto	48,105	3,152	13,444	3,505		2,618																																								11,029	91,574
Amhara	21 June 2021	Habru	58,295	1,802	3,240	1,140		2,429																																								7,801	81,355
Amhara	21 June 2021	Jama Degolo	23,349	2,027	4,262				1,753																																							7,445	46,201
Amhara	21 June 2021	Janamora	58,846	3,578	1,991	1,168															1,063																											4,915	84,810
Amhara	21 June 2021	Jiga	5,253	882	5,637	840		417	429																																							2,326	28,058
Amhara	21 June 2021	Kelela	41,751	731	607			773	341																																						975	4,462	53,482
Amhara	21 June 2021	Kemekem 1	42,300	440	1,537	660			276				252								293																											1,365	56,748
Amhara	21 June 2021	Kemekem 2	49,341	713	3,051	418			316			227	381								585																											1,399	81,428
Amhara	21 June 2021	Koso Ber	33,642	1,312	2,053	789			329										489																													2,117	47,474
Amhara	21 June 2021	Kui	11,569	2,880	6,764	1,692			1,719				1,178																																			6,009	48,049
Amhara	21 June 2021	Kutaber	31,343	1,375	1,057			545									471														575																	5,341	43,568
Amhara	21 June 2021	Layi Gaynt 1	22,258	1,154	1,896	1,220			773				647																																			2,636	38,543
Amhara	21 June 2021	Layi Gaynt 2	24,484	2,036	2,811	2,586																																										4,384	42,306
Amhara	21 June 2021	Legambo	62,517	922	1,766	824		1,172																																								5,240	77,098
Amhara	21 June 2021	Liben	20,139	845	6,037	2,449			872			561	1,260				830																															4,909	63,823
Amhara	21 June 2021	Lumame	16,455	1,273	4,791	1,033			1,190				677																																		2,333	7,842	47,738
Amhara	21 June 2021	Mehal Meda	34,560	3,533	7,529	2,576																																										10,309	67,034
Amhara	21 June 2021	Meket 1	21,486	3,084	5,989	2,714			1,476																																							8,139	52,832
Amhara	21 June 2021	Meket 2	20,949	1,588	2,654	4,952			2,755																																							8,198	51,344
Amhara	21 June 2021	Meqdela	52,337	1,981	1,907			558																							774																	7,061	70,396
Amhara	21 June 2021	Meranga	21,340	3,391	6,097	2,998																																										8,658	49,225
Amhara	21 June 2021	Merawi	17,523	1,617	9,184	2,066			1,239			490	757																																			3,686	69,592
Amhara	21 June 2021	Metema	32,864	3,152	7,409	2,136			1,404				1,190				655		855		1,303						1,545																					7,632	82,282
Amhara	21 June 2021	Mota	24,723	3,215	8,597	921			1,077																																							7,212	54,588
Amhara	21 June 2021	Qalu 1	46,965	2,112	4,532	1,871		1,454	476			502		440																																		4,567	70,084
Amhara	21 June 2021	Qalu 2	54,704	623	714	737		1,359																																								3,589	69,347
Amhara	21 June 2021	Qeyt	14,497	3,068	3,128	616			1,148																																							3,999	30,562
Amhara	21 June 2021	Qilaj	20,279	3,358	1,651	1,680													2,044																													3,551	37,877
Amhara	21 June 2021	Quarit	6,348	773	10,256	1,133			865				845																																			3,826	39,150
Amhara	21 June 2021	Qwara Matebiya	23,669	3,143	3,629	654			556				537				1,257		343		415						2,476																					2,750	56,801
Amhara	21 June 2021	Rabeli	13,264	1,803	2,033	1,068																																										4,217	24,958
Amhara	21 June 2021	Saynt 1	22,121	3,799	5,969	2,271																																										10,397	56,355
Amhara	21 June 2021	Saynt 2	11,737	2,313	4,183	2,556															1,358										1,322																	6,161	38,034
Amhara	21 June 2021	Sede	25,894	1,856	5,291																																											7,750	55,650
Amhara	21 June 2021	Sekela	25,908	893	3,518	1,263																																										1,951	42,799
Amhara	21 June 2021	Shola Gebeya	15,817	1,875	4,776	1,477			494																																	391						3,774	36,239
Amhara	21 June 2021	Simada 1	17,127	1,498	3,923	1,725																																										2,465	35,822
Amhara	21 June 2021	Simada 2	21,378	2,126	4,897	2,657																																										4,742	46,316
Amhara	21 June 2021	Tach Armachho 2	12,679	968	2,438	1,032			260				394								683																											2,526	34,808
Amhara	21 June 2021	Tach Gayiniti	23,135	3,685	4,561	1,907			1,044																																							6,064	46,641
Amhara	21 June 2021	Tenta	60,443	1,266	1,339			1,258																							1,411																	6,729	78,260
Amhara	21 June 2021	Tilili	10,918	1,786	3,433	1,465																																										3,027	30,019
Amhara	21 June 2021	Tis Abay	6,578	1,954	8,575	1,229			1,022			545	654																																			4,116	48,834
Amhara	21 June 2021	Wadla	16,506	3,001	5,446	7,941			1,756																																							13,412	58,003
Amhara	21 June 2021	Wegera 1	22,580	3,876	2,990	1,294			845			603	640						565								1,066																					3,981	66,185
Amhara	21 June 2021	Wegera 2	17,242	1,943	2,076	912			316				199				660																															1,199	38,457
Amhara	21 June 2021	Wein Amba	30,475	764	1,071			525	184																																						609	4,799	41,292
Amhara	21 June 2021	Wemberma	10,955	931	6,164	859			1,262																																							3,798	32,493
Amhara	21 June 2021	Werebabo	45,501	501	357			392	475																																							2,626	53,003
Amhara	21 June 2021	Wereilu	30,315	839	1,510	878		362	744																																							7,288	46,047
Amhara	21 June 2021	Yechereqa	31,186	1,027	1,875				613										3,897																													3,407	55,037
Amhara	21 June 2021	Yeidi Wiha	7,978	3,942	9,249																																											6,267	39,143
Amhara	21 June 2021	Yejuba	17,344	1,823	7,599	1,552			1,230				879																																			5,524	57,353
Amhara	21 June 2021	Zege Meshenti	12,253	1,021	6,205	574			877																						798																	2,723	42,581
Amhara	21 June 2021	Zukula Agew	30,702	670	593	1,935													347																													1,327	39,703
Benishangul-Gumuz	21 June 2021	Bambasi	12,269	796	1,396				618																															2,789								2,790	23,297
Benishangul-Gumuz	21 June 2021	Mao Komo Liyu	18,389																																													495	20,687
Benishangul-Gumuz	21 June 2021	Sherkole	24,510	974																						10,072																						7,093	44,832
Dire Dawa	21 June 2021	Dire Dawa 1	74,251	4,103	5,054			455	607	789		394		211			750																														1,008	2,981	104,398
Dire Dawa	21 June 2021	Dire Dawa 2	89,192	1,146		720		905				283		195																																	553	1,856	102,803
Gambela	21 June 2021	Gambela	38,633	8,138																15,480															4,869													6,108	105,707
Gambela	21 June 2021	Godere	18,382	2,277																2,238															867													1,929	32,168
Gambela	21 June 2021	Lare	211,867	14,817																																												2,252	231,387
Harari	30 September 2021	Jegol Liyu	9,362	93		58		82						64																															258		120	383	14,864
Harari	30 September 2021	Jegol Zuria ena Hundene	82,853	8,140																																												2,316	109,062
Oromia	21 June 2021	Abomisa	64,702																																													630	66,291
Oromia	21 June 2021	Abote Dera	116,420	579	898																																											408	129,259
Oromia	21 June 2021	Adaba	94,204																																													155	96,709
Oromia	21 June 2021	Adama 1	109,893	13,144	5,430									1,733																																		999	160,575
Oromia	21 June 2021	Adama 2	58,860	1,844	1,685																																											3,508	70,239
Oromia	21 June 2021	Adama 3	31,395	1,944																																												2,945	36,308
Oromia	21 June 2021	Adea 1	64,308	8,714																																												5,372	82,888
Oromia	21 June 2021	Adea 2	79,633																																													0	80,285
Oromia	21 June 2021	Adea Beriga	36,273																																													582	36,400
Oromia	21 June 2021	Adis Alem/Ejeree	32,561																																													902	37,461
Oromia	21 June 2021	Agarifa Gasera	84,935																																													348	89,215
Oromia	21 June 2021	Agulicho	69,043																																													204	69,713
Oromia	21 June 2021	Akaki Gimibichu	92,467																																													925	94,841
Oromia	21 June 2021	Alem Gena 1	46,891	3,008																																												3,087	55,047
Oromia	21 June 2021	Alem Gena 2	71,046	4,236				3,199																																								5,954	90,258
Oromia	21 June 2021	Alem Tena	70,236	2,577																																												2,768	78,812
Oromia	21 June 2021	Ambo 1	67,031																																													556	69,696
Oromia	21 June 2021	Ambo 2	41,120																																													1,603	48,120
Oromia	21 June 2021	Ano	62,142					2,532																																								2,294	69,454
Oromia	21 June 2021	Arboye	72,694																																													515	73,788
Oromia	21 June 2021	Arsi Negele	101,662																																													1,365	109,748
Oromia	21 June 2021	Aseko	56,986																																													87	57,398
Oromia	21 June 2021	Asela	83,212	3,665	851	1,405		1,498																																								5,053	105,447
Oromia	21 June 2021	Ayira Guliso	81,166																																													652	81,442
Oromia	21 June 2021	Bako Tibe	45,802																																													214	47,848
Oromia	21 June 2021	Batu/Zway	103,283	1,406																																												3,370	112,133
Oromia	21 June 2021	Becho	73,805																																													756	82,609
Oromia	21 June 2021	Bedele	114,702																																													676	117,143
Oromia	21 June 2021	Bedeno	168,104																																													39	168,526
Oromia	21 June 2021	Bedesa	130,660																																													0	130,672
Oromia	21 June 2021	Bekoji 1	60,293																																													3,979	70,336
Oromia	21 June 2021	Bekoji 2	60,736	161																																												1,058	64,733
Oromia	21 June 2021	Bele	125,413																																													494	126,466
Oromia	21 June 2021	Bereh Aleltu	83,805	2,434		851																																										3,697	94,421
Oromia	21 June 2021	Bilonopa	48,079																																													1,032	49,935
Oromia	21 June 2021	Boko	114,015																																													1,184	114,088
Oromia	21 June 2021	Bore	104,782																																												1,067	1,596	115,406
Oromia	21 June 2021	Boreda	94,092																																													11	94,244
Oromia	21 June 2021	Chancho	78,732																																													590	87,164
Oromia	21 June 2021	Cheleniko 1	104,526																																													156	108,043
Oromia	21 June 2021	Cheleniko 2	55,730																																													234	56,197
Oromia	21 June 2021	Cheliya 1	46,141																																													1,367	50,257
Oromia	21 June 2021	Cheliya 2	44,910																																													296	47,085
Oromia	21 June 2021	Chiro 1	131,121																																													143	132,355
Oromia	21 June 2021	Chiro 2	62,501																																													3	62,521
Oromia	21 June 2021	Chiro 3	54,803																																													9	54,845
Oromia	21 June 2021	Chole	71,509	2,864																																												1,935	80,058
Oromia	21 June 2021	Chora	68,181	924																																												2,284	72,815
Oromia	21 June 2021	Dandi 1	51,436																																													229	56,020
Oromia	21 June 2021	Dandi 2	40,914																																													535	44,053
Oromia	21 June 2021	Dano	37,938																																													193	38,851
Oromia	21 June 2021	Darimu	73,545																																													967	75,446
Oromia	21 June 2021	Deder 1	78,794																																													58	80,937
Oromia	21 June 2021	Deder 2	70,697																																													528	71,245
Oromia	21 June 2021	Dedo 1	79,953																																													247	86,567
Oromia	21 June 2021	Dedo 2	83,014																																													20	84,602
Oromia	21 June 2021	Degem	46,528																																													0	47,078
Oromia	21 June 2021	Delo Mana	146,723																																													106	157,398
Oromia	21 June 2021	Dembi	80,394																																													335	81,799
Oromia	21 June 2021	Dembi Dolo	60,701																																													947	67,961
Oromia	21 June 2021	Dera	115,838	2,839																																												5,243	130,203
Oromia	21 June 2021	Diga Kolobo	71,162																																													740	72,646
Oromia	21 June 2021	Dimtu	79,185																																													107	79,820
Oromia	21 June 2021	Doba	100,690																																													19	100,695
Oromia	21 June 2021	Dodola	85,523																																													1,652	98,570
Oromia	21 June 2021	Dugda Meki	71,479	1,858																																												1,646	78,347
Oromia	21 June 2021	Enango Bila	49,353																																													247	49,610
Oromia	21 June 2021	Fincha'a	80,882																																													0	80,945
Oromia	21 June 2021	Funyanibira	316,438																																													338	318,108
Oromia	21 June 2021	Galo	41,746																																													52	46,281
Oromia	21 June 2021	Gatira	115,974																																													244	116,448
Oromia	21 June 2021	Gechi Borecha	81,106																																													247	81,690
Oromia	21 June 2021	Gedeb Hasasa	98,858											667																																		1,284	101,696
Oromia	21 June 2021	Gera	72,540	98																																												284	73,311
Oromia	21 June 2021	Gimbi	65,650																																													495	66,573
Oromia	21 June 2021	Ginir	146,304	78																																												286	149,722
Oromia	21 June 2021	Girar Jarso	44,330	977		681																																										10	50,305
Oromia	21 June 2021	Girawa	270,560																																													3	270,825
Oromia	21 June 2021	Goba	36,293	2,975																																												1,935	43,720
Oromia	21 June 2021	Goma 1	64,935	194																																												865	66,413
Oromia	21 June 2021	Goma 2	76,892	266		75																																										965	79,275
Oromia	21 June 2021	Gore	9,019																																												54,225	5,236	71,349
Oromia	21 June 2021	Goro	205,087																																													333	208,015
Oromia	21 June 2021	Gui Genet	39,166																																													164	39,589
Oromia	21 June 2021	Gute	57,349																																													570	57,613
Oromia	21 June 2021	Habro 1	77,266																																													80	79,276
Oromia	21 June 2021	Habro 2	50,245																																													29	50,966
Oromia	21 June 2021	Hagere Mariam/Bulee Horaa	94,330	347																																												11,188	104,000
Oromia	21 June 2021	Haremaya 1	97,495					1,881																																								1,869	104,484
Oromia	21 June 2021	Haremaya 2	74,354																																													1,010	76,896
Oromia	21 June 2021	Harewecha	21,779																																												247,657	589	270,697
Oromia	21 June 2021	Hirina	116,788																																													34	117,029
Oromia	21 June 2021	Itaya	75,535											1,152																																		3,627	83,498
Oromia	21 June 2021	Jara	110,525	390																																												745	113,705
Oromia	21 June 2021	Jeldu	61,617																																													36	62,688
Oromia	21 June 2021	Jima Arijo	40,513																																													115	40,951
Oromia	21 June 2021	Jima Kerisa	93,900	5						10																																						1,093	97,910
Oromia	21 June 2021	Jima Ketema	84,032	5,540				860	1,840																																						3,462	8,017	112,912
Oromia	21 June 2021	Kake	55,248																																													276	58,246
Oromia	21 June 2021	Kemona	150,829																																													19	154,543
Oromia	21 June 2021	Kersa	95,915																																													642	103,896
Oromia	21 June 2021	Kersa 1	80,120																																													139	80,300
Oromia	21 June 2021	Kersa 2	59,914																																													21	59,960
Oromia	21 June 2021	Kibre Mengset	210,935	2,929																																												4,063	235,364
Oromia	21 June 2021	Kimbbit	71,316	2,151																																												2,225	77,847
Oromia	21 June 2021	Kofele 1	102,914											36																																		290	103,423
Oromia	21 June 2021	Kofele 2	76,830											192																																		574	78,028
Oromia	21 June 2021	Kokosa	132,884																																													227	133,541
Oromia	21 June 2021	Kombolcha 1	90,114																																													113	90,588
Oromia	21 June 2021	Kula	79,911					248																																								787	81,312
Oromia	21 June 2021	Kurfa Chele	42,155																																													5,498	42,809
Oromia	21 June 2021	Kuyu	61,186																																													69	62,867
Oromia	21 June 2021	Lalo	80,740																																													0	82,515
Oromia	21 June 2021	Lemeni	38,958																																													813	46,095
Oromia	21 June 2021	Limu Kosa 1	73,461						348																																							1,057	76,249
Oromia	21 June 2021	Limu Kosa 2	71,016																																													181	71,763
Oromia	21 June 2021	Limu Seka	98,404	55																																												223	99,063
Oromia	21 June 2021	Lume/Mojo	67,685	3,821	3,120																																											5,374	83,459
Oromia	21 June 2021	Mana	82,195	347																																												1,280	86,188
Oromia	21 June 2021	Meko Sachi	40,919																																													53	42,676
Oromia	21 June 2021	Melka Soda	130,320	1,388																																												1,153	146,655
Oromia	21 June 2021	Mendi	62,682																																													873	63,149
Oromia	21 June 2021	Mesela	107,130																																													0	112,254
Oromia	21 June 2021	Meta Robi	46,703																																													1,326	49,348
Oromia	21 June 2021	Metu	8,936																																												37,705; 2,723	4,481	56,115
Oromia	21 June 2021	Micheta	280,178																																													0	280,274
Oromia	21 June 2021	Mieso	103,950																																													0	104,373
Oromia	21 June 2021	Moyale	191,809	580																																												618	211,156
Oromia	21 June 2021	Negele	136,618	1,444																																											3,930; 1,455	3,630	151,191
Oromia	21 June 2021	Nejo	67,565																																													840	68,454
Oromia	21 June 2021	Nekemite	94,833	1,602																																												3,569	103,694
Oromia	21 June 2021	Nole Keba 1	38,102																																													242	38,481
Oromia	21 June 2021	Nole Keba 2	39,399																																													76	39,956
Oromia	21 June 2021	Nono	68,680																																													373	71,136
Oromia	21 June 2021	Nunu	39,401																																													48	39,601
Oromia	21 June 2021	Omo Nada 1	71,412	25						49																																						412	73,042
Oromia	21 June 2021	Omo Nada 2	78,682	55																																												274	79,466
Oromia	21 June 2021	Qebe	67,776																																													876	68,184
Oromia	21 June 2021	Qericha	162,706	1,245																																												1,477	193,592
Oromia	21 June 2021	Robe	78,996																																													898	82,166
Oromia	21 June 2021	Sagure	74,650	128				168																																								3,247	76,792
Oromia	21 June 2021	Seka Chekorsa 1	91,383	80					21																																							946	92,512
Oromia	21 June 2021	Seka Chekorsa 2	95,286																																													329	98,538
Oromia	21 June 2021	Sekoru	71,898	151						437																																						1,537	76,078
Oromia	21 June 2021	Shambu	49,011																																													504	49,684
Oromia	21 June 2021	Shashemene 1	143,836							2,173				2,269																																		4,646	159,623
Oromia	21 June 2021	Shashemene 2	65,791																																												1,353	1,713	74,860
Oromia	21 June 2021	Shrika	76,912																																													338	78,122
Oromia	21 June 2021	Sibu Sire	48,605																																													593	49,766
Oromia	21 June 2021	Sinana	69,507	2,042																																												3,686	85,569
Oromia	21 June 2021	Siraro 1	83,711																																													375	85,244
Oromia	21 June 2021	Siraro 2	91,333							1,473																																						2,360	98,015
Oromia	21 June 2021	Sululta/Mulo	91,875																																													1,682	95,254
Oromia	21 June 2021	Teji	52,147	830										1,869																																		2,027	63,360
Oromia	21 June 2021	Tejo	116,979																																													0	123,366
Oromia	21 June 2021	Ticho	71,615																																													774	76,906
Oromia	21 June 2021	Tikur Enechini	59,425											1,097																																		2,039	70,035
Oromia	21 June 2021	Uka	64,471																																													627	65,964
Oromia	21 June 2021	Uraga	176,130																																													350	180,702
Oromia	21 June 2021	Wara Jarso	64,794																																													665	68,606
Oromia	21 June 2021	Wenchi	21,625											883																																	1,402	1,290	33,202
Oromia	21 June 2021	Wolen Chiti	109,342	2,349	2,155									1,716																																		7,474	131,841
Oromia	21 June 2021	Wolimera	116,968					10,076																								6,941																10,763	156,855
Oromia	21 June 2021	Woliso 1	37,805			925								1,705																																		2,433	46,462
Oromia	21 June 2021	Woliso 2	44,545											801																																		800	49,649
Oromia	21 June 2021	Wuchalena Jido	71,982																																													374	75,251
Oromia	21 June 2021	Yabelo	158,134	508																																												768	162,387
Oromia	21 June 2021	Yaya Gulele/Debre Libanos	50,441																																													326	51,978
Oromia	21 June 2021	Yayu	47,779																																													1,530	50,443
Oromia	21 June 2021	Yubdo	45,994																																													180	46,452
SNNPR	21 June 2021	Adiya Kaka	50,825	3,611					1,201																												1,508	1,250										8,626	81,231
SNNPR	21 June 2021	Afa	46,823	5,565				203	457			145		187		740		7,774																													451	4,683	85,621
SNNPR	21 June 2021	Alaba 1	105,207	274				514		212																																						1,895	112,741
SNNPR	21 June 2021	Alaba 2	104,078	693				358		590							238																															1,664	115,555
SNNPR	21 June 2021	Alicho Werero	36,294	545				1,758																																								1,739	49,155
SNNPR	21 June 2021	Amaro Kele	8,685	31,035					1,182	1,877																																					1,634	5,311	72,035
SNNPR	21 June 2021	Amdebir	22,586	7,269	436	689		259																																								3,925	44,443
SNNPR	21 June 2021	Anigacha 1	26,927	1,603						693																																					1,387	3,727	51,867
SNNPR	21 June 2021	Anigacha 2	32,162	443						723							489																															1,731	42,125
SNNPR	21 June 2021	Arbaminch	66,176	10,254		3,496		562	1,246	1,691		388		518		1,068						3,940																										6,916	120,780
SNNPR	21 June 2021	Azernet Berbere	31,443	532				1,196		1,513																																						2,702	43,856
SNNPR	21 June 2021	Azha 1	9,110	12,914	662																																											3,197	31,908
SNNPR	21 June 2021	Azha 2	9,277	11,788		1,087		640																																								3,329	35,228
SNNPR	21 June 2021	Bako Gazer 1	62,160	13,737						7,627		1,876																																				7,896	115,094
SNNPR	21 June 2021	Bako Gazer 2	30,415	4,620						2,458		998				715																																5,120	52,659
SNNPR	30 September 2021	Basketo Liyu	6,653	4,024					912																																							1,844	22,170
SNNPR	21 June 2021	Birber	57,379	4,529		196		285		847		98		374								1,195																										2,848	79,772
SNNPR	30 September 2021	Bita Gesha	92,193	705																																	408	381										2,079	99,228
SNNPR	21 June 2021	Boloso Sore 1	19,703	8,126				417		1,457		1,052		313																				2,547														6,469	55,195
SNNPR	30 September 2021	Boloso Sore 2	39,313	2,136		104		126	49	860		93		65			84																	179										177				1,515	54,340
SNNPR	30 September 2021	Boloso Sore 3	59,705	1,060		121		65	61	155		45		130																				534														1,015	76,475
SNNPR	30 September 2021	Bule	14,678	604							2,587																																					1,456	40,661
SNNPR	21 June 2021	Burji	10,719	7,224						1,576																																						2,837	29,247
SNNPR	21 June 2021	Chenicha	21,189	3,732				504		1,591		1,312		710								5,226																										6,003	50,138
SNNPR	21 June 2021	Chiri Medebenya	54,121	1,641					147																												1,203	404										5,454	70,049
SNNPR	21 June 2021	Dalocha	62,927	1,004				2,119													888																											4,552	84,831
SNNPR	21 June 2021	Damot Gale 1	31,884	5,940				539	713	1,227		742		519			622	8,319																														4,691	75,119
SNNPR	21 June 2021	Damot Gale 2	43,320	4,531				293	203	633		117		159			131	1,854																														2,689	66,421
SNNPR	30 September 2021	Damot Weyde 1	47,696	533		46		73	16	416		45		33			55																	444														499	52,493
SNNPR	21 June 2021	Damot Weyde 2	32,957	2,947		958		87	218	388		121		36				570																														2,560	47,163
SNNPR	21 June 2021	Dasenechi	33,811																																													684	36,611
SNNPR	21 June 2021	Derashe Liyu	18,515	8,036					2,158																																							2,765	36,056
SNNPR	30 September 2021	Dezi Liyu	11,454	2,031																																												598	18,594
SNNPR	21 June 2021	Dita	18,517	3,481				667						733								1,535																										3,867	38,424
SNNPR	21 June 2021	Felege Selam	55,022	1,269																																												1,128	59,397
SNNPR	21 June 2021	Feseha Genet/Yegeneti Desita	48,068	3,540							56,082																																					11,844	156,387
SNNPR	21 June 2021	Gerese	34,440	7,062				2,560	1,425													1,538																										10,649	71,567
SNNPR	21 June 2021	Gewada Liyu	17,922	5,404					1,020																																							2,170	32,475
SNNPR	21 June 2021	Gidole Medebenya	8,623						2,494																																							2,684	17,376
SNNPR	21 June 2021	Gimbo	75,964	7,103				517	435	2,850																											647	1,574										7,321	110,399
SNNPR	21 June 2021	Gofa Zuria 1	32,972	7,653					1,687	850		510				728																																6,390	62,640
SNNPR	21 June 2021	Gofa Zuria 2	18,519	5,710					995	818		426																																				5,296	40,211
SNNPR	21 June 2021	Gumer 1	9,258	3,592				1,808																																								4,843	24,325
SNNPR	21 June 2021	Gumer 2	16,173	5,232				609																																								2,314	30,453
SNNPR	30 September 2021	Hamer Liyu	24,449	1,351								352																																				466	29,105
SNNPR	21 June 2021	Humibo	44,714	8,472		766		283	292	1,367		229		121			120																	2,572														4,882	77,300
SNNPR	21 June 2021	Inemor Ina Ener 1	21,359	5,498																																												3,493	39,409
SNNPR	21 June 2021	Inemor Ina Ener 2	9,872	3,566				1,516																																								2,905	24,190
SNNPR	21 June 2021	Isra Tocha	63,163	5,173						3,058				558																																		7,290	96,189
SNNPR	21 June 2021	Kacha Bira	51,545	1,210						1,366											1,274																						980					4,035	75,312
SNNPR	21 June 2021	Kedida Gamela 1	22,338	233						443		53																																				1,495	29,061
SNNPR	21 June 2021	Kedida Gamela 2	38,847	1,001						981		403					191																															3,308	58,447
SNNPR	21 June 2021	Kemiba	43,215	6,435		469		170	164	1,630				91								256																										3,560	73,696
SNNPR	30 September 2021	Keyi Afer Medebenya	42,780	2,140																																												1,184	56,161
SNNPR	21 June 2021	Kibeti	91,380	1,188				3,200																																								3,897	120,366
SNNPR	21 June 2021	Kindo Koyesha 1	24,061	6,160		254		301	404			210		176				649																														1,953	44,895
SNNPR	30 September 2021	Kindo Koyesha 2	44,020	382				15	37	114		11						68																37														331	46,738
SNNPR	21 June 2021	Kokir	34,041	607																																					2,579							2,176	47,336
SNNPR	21 June 2021	Koniso	54,129	29,871																																												6,682	105,259
SNNPR	21 June 2021	Konita Liyu	54,600	869						711																																						2,564	60,045
SNNPR	30 September 2021	Konteb 1	17,108	2,103		330				1,219							229																														230	2,060	38,860
SNNPR	30 September 2021	Konteb 2	34,389	181		155				1,163							143																															1,583	51,243
SNNPR	21 June 2021	Konteb 3	44,788	480		661				4,125																																						3,530	72,791
SNNPR	21 June 2021	Kucha	17,400	571				249		1,100		178				19,816						607																										4,158	50,001
SNNPR	21 June 2021	Lasika/Basiketo Medebenya	4,054	1,603					113	165																																						1,387	8,117
SNNPR	30 September 2021	Lemo 1	76,099	800		673			359	2,041				120			192																														166	2,763	117,259
SNNPR	21 June 2021	Lemo 2	48,073	206		94				1,442							66																															2,948	61,324
SNNPR	21 June 2021	Lenfaro	43,889	1,617				4,080																																								4,702	72,721
SNNPR	30 September 2021	Loma Bosa	58,199	1,236						1,595				252																																		5,557	86,092
SNNPR	30 September 2021	Majet Medebegna	12,388	1,304																																												1,519	21,211
SNNPR	21 June 2021	Male Liyu	25,421	5,946						809		675																																				1,615	41,978
SNNPR	21 June 2021	Mareka Gena	79,135	1,553						751				183																																		2,833	93,919
SNNPR	30 September 2021	Masha	29,408	1,300		1,123																								4,613																		8,377	51,304
SNNPR	30 September 2021	Meanit Liyu	62,025	1,867																																												1,054	75,307
SNNPR	21 June 2021	Melo Koza	30,731	9,832					2,476			1,451																																				8,501	65,489
SNNPR	21 June 2021	Meseqanna Mareqo 1	29,924	1,301		1,443																																									6,559; 5,672	4,590	71,143
SNNPR	21 June 2021	Mizani Teferi	74,941	5,107		3,129				4,954																																						10,647	123,249
SNNPR	21 June 2021	Nao Liyu	5,706	175																																												204	6,440
SNNPR	21 June 2021	Oyda Liyu	5,806	4,975					482			370																																				2,517	16,333
SNNPR	30 September 2021	Sheko Liyu	13,854	177	82																																											48	14,465
SNNPR	21 June 2021	Sheyi Bench	67,056	5,393																																												5,653	88,640
SNNPR	21 June 2021	Sike 1	35,942	753		145				5,124		205					424				196																											5,881	62,387
SNNPR	21 June 2021	Sike 2	28,421	1,756		393				9,137							752				870																											7,211	69,107
SNNPR	21 June 2021	Sodo	25,610	4,625	809	631				2,022																																						5,006	54,870
SNNPR	30 September 2021	Sodo Zuriya 1	60,045	1,828		216		114	205	730		131		145		285	126	514																														2,170	80,848
SNNPR	30 September 2021	Sodo Zuriya 2	48,065	2,803		1,714		175		370		397		239		434	302	686																														3,280	81,325
SNNPR	21 June 2021	Soro 1	80,823	284		171			189	4,407							248				158																											4,259	118,024
SNNPR	21 June 2021	Soro 2	48,098	410		294			231	3,920							382				211																											3,028	76,195
SNNPR	30 September 2021	Surma Liyu	5,356	295																																												130	7,730
SNNPR	21 June 2021	Temibaro	49,516	3,226						1,431											252																						1,134	250				4,451	83,607
SNNPR	30 September 2021	Tepi	38,713	6,713		1,812		2,530																						3,349																		12,363	87,916
SNNPR	21 June 2021	Tsemayi Liyu	8,105	460																																												576	10,437
SNNPR	21 June 2021	Uba Debre Tsehay	11,720	9,155					364	729		579																																				5,544	40,109
SNNPR	21 June 2021	Wacha	81,176	1,820					802																												992	1,085										4,072	99,351
SNNPR	21 June 2021	Welkite	65,611	9,304	5,478	522																																									1,413; 981	4,603	10,064
SNNPR	21 June 2021	Wenago 1	18,368	879							3,208																																					3,404	30,637
SNNPR	21 June 2021	Wenago 2	26,733	3,325							5,389																																					2,774	45,791
SNNPR	21 June 2021	Wenago 3	34,143	3,143							6,852																																					5,562	60,529
SNNPR	21 June 2021	Yemi Liyu	23,562	3,063						2,279																																						4,351	35,225
SNNPR	21 June 2021	Yirga Chefe 1	10,731	1,763							8,730																																					3,018	26,973
SNNPR	21 June 2021	Yirga Chefe 2	22,056	1,252							28,230																																					7,748	69,651
SNNPR	21 June 2021	Zala Daramalo	47,225	8,472					487	733		260										380																										3,735	79,064
SNNPR	21 June 2021	Zeyse Liyu	2,684	3,680				366	229	385				230																																		1,360	10,258
Sidama	21 June 2021	Aleta Wendo	67,837	596				64				130																456	411																			935	73,089
Sidama	21 June 2021	Arbegona	107,887	79				34	20																			174	100																			605	113,363
Sidama	21 June 2021	Aroresa	96,886																									3,257	2,999																			4,682	136,152
Sidama	21 June 2021	Belela	99,050																										205																			537	102,560
Sidama	21 June 2021	Bensa	179,877	160								69																327	93																			700	190,280
Sidama	21 June 2021	Bursa	64,275					74																				200	107																			806	67,921
Sidama	21 June 2021	Chuko	71,818	153				489																				51	154																			968	69,309
Sidama	21 June 2021	Dara	61,534	1,113																								1,167	1,432																			4,010	72,896
Sidama	21 June 2021	Dese	96,729	161																								131	201																			741	102,490
Sidama	21 June 2021	Duba	74,303	145																								256	92																			740	76,707
Sidama	21 June 2021	Gorche	89,034	8																								159	24																			312	91,772
Sidama	21 June 2021	Guguma	60,513	50										50															83																			267	63,319
Sidama	21 June 2021	Hagere Selam/Hula	77,616																									358	636																			757	81,988
Sidama	21 June 2021	Hawasa	179,834	8,517		2,048		544	1,129	1,466		587		213		406	422											471	870																			5,271	239,842
Sidama	21 June 2021	Leku	65,273	241					75																			237	106																			810	71,036
Sidama	21 June 2021	Sentariya	59,782	93				103																				321																				810	62,583
Sidama	21 June 2021	Shafna	66,105	730								99																616	546																			1,146	72,774
Sidama	21 June 2021	Tula	108,128	212										68														499	125																			2,023	119,663
Sidama	21 June 2021	Yirba	77,254	34																								102	126																			881	80,101
Somali	30 September 2021	Arabi	357,048	109				172																												225												3,265	378,552
Somali	30 September 2021	Aware	192,683	106																																											21,647	2,579	235,241
Somali	30 September 2021	Aysha	55,349																																													151	55,500
Somali	30 September 2021	Bohdanot	56,669					140																												89												131	62,115
Somali	30 September 2021	Chereti	249,588																																													2,572	262,940
Somali	30 September 2021	Degahabur	233,738																																	2,370												3,370	251,728
Somali	30 September 2021	Degahmedo	60,846					40																												85										68	291	0	65,348
Somali	30 September 2021	Elkere	182,697					20																												6												941	196,412
Somali	30 September 2021	Erer	193,798					23																												21												1,099	201,733
Somali	30 September 2021	Feltu	572,697					258																												1,647												3,784	589,748
Somali	30 September 2021	Fik	281,710	12																																											94,513	7,189	395,483
Somali	30 September 2021	Gashamo	76,440																																													918	96,333
Somali	30 September 2021	Geladin	28,805					114																												28											106	1	31,500
Somali	30 September 2021	Gode	327,257	23				2,500																												46												6,136	356,799
Somali	30 September 2021	Hargele	198,221																																													5,639	213,355
Somali	30 September 2021	Jigjiga 1	160,293	50				172																												128											315	1,647	200,681
Somali	30 September 2021	Jigjiga 2	129,792	245				454																												552												2,315	187,215
Somali	30 September 2021	Kebri Beyah	498,493	41				4,841																												87												609	538,153
Somali	30 September 2021	Kebri Dehar	237,852	11																																												148	267,330
Somali	30 September 2021	Kelafo	147,103					62																												42											53	411	162,116
Somali	30 September 2021	Segeg	237,415																																													136	252,908
Somali	30 September 2021	Shenle	74,968																																												809	5	78,367
Somali	30 September 2021	Warder	64,042	111				205																												308											231	1,266	70,837

== Aftermath ==
=== Reactions ===
USIP: oppositions accused the Prosperity Party of intimidating, widespread detention of party members and of interfering in voter registration. In addition, NAMA also reported the deaths of some of its supporters at the hands of the government. Other smaller parties also made similar complaints.

Getachew Reda, a spokesperson for the TPLF, mocked the election in a tweet, saying the Tigray Defense Forces had captured hundreds of ENDF soldiers as a gift for Abiy's "coronation as the Naked Emperor of Ethiopia."

The African Union, which observed the conduct of the elections, said in a statement:

It is noteworthy that the June 2021 general elections took place within the context of reforms that opened the political and civic space which enhanced the enjoyment of more basic rights and freedoms in comparison to the 2015 elections. Among the many positive political developments, the most prominent were the institutional strengthening of the NEBE, the release of political prisoners and the return of exiled political activists. The Mission concludes that despite some operational, logistical, security, political and COVID-19 related challenges, overall, the pre-election and Election Day processes were conducted in an orderly, peaceful and credible manner. There was nothing, in the Mission’s estimation, that distracted from the credible conduct of the elections. The Mission, therefore, commends all Ethiopians for the demonstrated commitment to the democratic development of the country. The AUEOM calls on all stakeholders to remain calm in the remaining electoral phase. The Mission urges any stakeholder that is dissatisfied with the electoral outcome to seek redress through the established legal and institutional mechanisms.

Another observer delegation to the elections, a limited joint mission of the International Republican Institute and the National Democratic Institute, found that the elections had been preceded by promising political reforms, but that:

political space, participation, and competition were acutely limited by widespread insecurity, open conflicts, and other serious constraints in the electoral environment... Though there were important improvements over past elections, particularly relating to the national election body and election monitoring by political parties and civil society, the environment fell short of essential standards for civil liberties, equitable campaign conditions, and security.

Other civil society organisations expressed similar misgivings, as did the United States Secretary of State, who said in a statement that the "electoral process... was not free or fair for all Ethiopians". Five opposition parties – the Ethiopian Social Democratic Party, Balderas for True Democracy, National Movement of Amhara, Afar People's Party, and Ethiopian Citizens for Social Justice – submitted complaints about irregularities in the electoral process.

=== 2024 elections ===
On 23 June 2024, elections were held in nine constituencies where voting had been cancelled in 2021.

Party	Votes	%	Seats
Prosperity Party	462,858	84.15	7
Ethiopian Citizens for Social Justice	28,963	5.27	1
National Movement of Amhara	15,910	2.89	0
Ethiopian Social Democratic Party	12,189	2.22	1
Afar People's Party	8,277	1.50	0
Gumuz People's Democratic Movement	7,153	1.30	0
Afar Revolutionary Democratic Unity Front	5,580	1.01	0
Boro Democratic Party	3,773	0.69	0
Benshangul People's Freedom Movement	1,344	0.24	0
Independent	4,021	0.73	0
Total	550,068	100.00	9
Valid votes	550,068	96.03	
Invalid/blank votes	22,734	3.97	
Total votes	572,802	100.00	
Registered voters/turnout	698,320	82.03	

==== By constituencies ====
23 June 2024 elections results by constituency
Region	Constituency	PP	ECSJ	NMA	ESDP	APP	GPDM	ARDUF	BDP	BPFM	Ind	Invalid	Electorate
Afar	Dalifage	250,159		8,403			7,153					1,263	295,366
Afar	Gawane Bure Modayitu	89,983		7,507								837	129,106
Benishangul-Gumuz	Asosa Hoha	9,887			1,272	4,601		1,523				2,555	38,907
Benishangul-Gumuz	Asosa Magale	6,310			490	1,677		710				1,100	24,726
Benishangul-Gumuz	Daleti	17,753				1,999						987	26,501
Benishangul-Gumuz	Kemashi	12,882	12,913									3,535	34,154
Benishangul-Gumuz	Metekel	24,813	16,050		8,474			3,347	3,283			8,545	84,826
Benishangul-Gumuz	Shinasha Liyu	948			1,953				142			268	4,069
Central Ethiopia	Meseqanna Mareqo 2	50,123							348	1,344	1,995; 1,076; 950	3,644	60,665
