= 2000 Ethiopian general election =

- 14 May–31 August 2000
- All 547 seats in the House of Peoples' Representatives; 274 seats needed for a majority
Party	Seats	+/–
OPDO	183	+7
ANDM	146	+13
SEPDM	112	+112
TPLF	40	+2
ESPDP	19	+19
ANDP	8	+8
BGPDUF	6	+6
CAFPDE	4	+4
GPDF	3	+3
HNDO	3	−6
SEPDC	2	+2
Ethiopian Democratic Party	2	+2
Independents	13	+3
This lists parties that won seats. See the complete results below.
Prime Minister before	Prime Minister after
Meles Zenawi	Meles Zenawi

General elections were held in Ethiopia on 14 May and 31 August 2000 for seats in the House of Peoples' Representatives and several regional government councils. Although several opposition parties boycotted the election, 17 parties including the All-Amhara People's Organization, the Southern Ethiopia Peoples' Democratic Coalition (SEPDC), and the Oromo National Congress did participate.

In round one, held on 14 May, there were 20,252,000 registered voters, of whom 90% voted. the Ethiopian People's Revolutionary Democratic Front (EPRDF) member parties captured 481 of the 524 seats in the national election. Independents won 10 seats and other parties won six. Six of the seven constituencies in the Hadiya Zone where elections were run, were won by the Hadiya National Democratic Organization (HNDO) led by Beyene Petros.

The second round was held on 31 August for the Somali Region alone, with 23 seats reserved for the region in the House of Peoples' Representatives and the 168 seats in the State Council. About 75% of the 1.15 million registered voters in the Region cast ballots. Announced results gave 19 of the seats to the SPDP, and the remaining four to independent candidates.

In the Regional elections, either the EPRDF or one of its member parties won the election except in Afar (where the Afar National Democratic Party won 84 of the 87 local seats), Benishangul-Gumuz (where the Benishangul Gumuz People's Democratic Unity Front won 71 of the 80 seats), Gambela (where the Gambela People's Democratic Front won 40 of the 53 seats), and Somali (where the Somali People's Democratic Party won 150 of the 168 seats).

According to observers organized by Ethiopian Human Rights Council, local U.N. staff, diplomatic missions, political parties, and domestic non-governmental organizations, both the general and the regional elections that year were generally free and fair in most areas; however, serious election irregularities occurred in the Southern Nations, Nationalities and Peoples' Region (SNNPR), particularly in the Hadiya Zone.

== Serious election irregularities in the SNNPR ==
According to observers organized by Ethiopian Human Rights Council, local U.N. staff, diplomatic missions, political parties, and domestic non-governmental organizations, both the general and the regional elections that year were generally free and fair in most areas; however, serious election irregularities occurred in the SNNPR, particularly in the Hadiya Zone. As a result, the National Election Board of Ethiopia (NEBE) investigated the complaints and determined that many of them had merit. These included incidents of election officials instructing voters for whom to vote, candidates campaigning at polling stations, and candidates being pressured into quitting. There also were credible reports of ballot stuffing, vote count fraud, voter intimidation or bribery, dismissals from work, withholding of salaries, detentions, abductions, and killings.

In its annual report on Human Rights, the US State Department stated that there were numerous credible reports that persons who supported or voted for opposition candidates were harassed. For example, there were credible reports that ruling party personnel withheld fertilizer and food aid in the SNNPR as retaliation for voters electing opposition candidates. According to the SEPDC, some of their supporters were suspended or dismissed from their jobs in retaliation, and some teachers in the SNNPR who served as SEPDC election observers found their salaries were withheld and were denied entry to summer update courses. many civil servants who supported the opposition were fired from their positions.

== Results ==
In round one, held on 14 May, there were 20,252,000 registered voters, of whom 90% voted. Results were announced in mid-June by the NEBE. The EPRDF won 481 of the 547 seats in the national election, broken down between its members as follows: the Oromo Peoples' Democratic Organization (183), the Amhara National Democratic Movement (146), the Southern Ethiopian People's Democratic Movement (112) and the Tigray People's Liberation Front (40). Independents won 13 seats and other parties won 53 seats. Six of the seven constituencies in the Hadiya Zone where elections were run, were won by the HNDO.

The second round was held August 31 for the Somali Region alone. Candidates from the Alliance of Somali Democratic Forces, the Western Somali Democratic Party, and the Somali People's Democratic Party (SPDP), as well as 156 private candidates contested the 23 seats reserved for the region in the House of Peoples' Representatives and the 168 seats in the State Council. About 75% of the 1.15 million registered voters in the Region cast ballots. Announced results gave 19 of the seats to the SPDP, and the remaining four to independent candidates.

In the Regional elections, either the EPRDF or one of its member parties won the election except in Afar (where the Afar National Democratic Party won 84 of the 87 local seats), Benishangul-Gumuz (where the Benishangul Gumuz People's Democratic Unity Front won 71 of the 80 seats), Gambela (where the Gambela People's Democratic Front won 40 of the 53 seats), and Somali (where the Somali People's Democratic Party won 150 of the 168 seats).

Party	Votes	%	Seats
Oromo People's Democratic Organization			183
Amhara National Democratic Movement			146
Southern Ethiopian People's Democratic Movement			112
Tigray People's Liberation Front			40
Ethiopian Somali People's Democratic Party			19
Afar National Democratic Party			8
Benishangul-Gumuz People's Democratic Unity Front			6
Council of Alternative Forces for Peace and Democracy in Ethiopia			4
Gambela Peoples Democratic Front			3
Hadiya National Democratic Organization			3
Southern Ethiopia Peoples' Democratic Coalition			2
Ethiopian Democratic Party			2
Other parties			6
Independents			13
Total			547
Registered voters/turnout	20,252,000	–	
Source: IPU
