= Ethiopian nationalism =

Political ideology

The plain green, yellow and red flag of historical Ethiopia and the Ethiopian Community.

Ethiopian nationalism, also referred to as Ethiopianism or Ethiopianness (Amharic: ኢትዮጵያዊነት, Ityop̣p̣yawinnät), according to its proponents, asserts that Ethiopians are a single nation, and promotes the social equality of all component ethnic groups. Ethiopian people as a whole regardless of ethnicity constitute sovereignty as one polity. Ethiopian nationalism is a type of civic nationalism in that it is multi-ethnic in nature, and promotes multiculturalism.

Opponents of Ethiopian nationalism, on the other hand, claim that for more than a century, it was a vehicle through which a supposedly Amhara ruling elite pursued an assimilation policy and consolidated power.

There are varying perspectives on the definition and history of Ethiopian nationalism.

== Perspectives ==
=== Proponents ===
The view espoused by Ethiopian nationalists is that Ethiopian civic nationalism is in contrast to and in opposition against ethno-nationalist supremacism fueled by ethnic federalist policies introduced by the EPRDF in which Ethiopian nationalists claim that regional subdivisions of the state were segregated according to ethnicity brought about by the partitioning and dissolution of traditionally multi-ethnic regions causing the internal displacement of people through internal population transfers. However, there has been opposition to multi-ethnic Ethiopian civic nationalism from ethnic nationalist and separatists groups as seen in the surge of ethnic tensions between various Ethiopian ethnic groups and political parties most notably among the most populous ethnic groups in the country such as the Amhara, Oromo, Somali, and Tigray peoples, most of whom who have separatist movements among their ranks, and conflict between Ethiopia and various ethnic groups that make up the Eritrean population with Eritrean Provincial Separatists vying for and later accomplishing the independence of Eritrea (who had already formed their own region specific Eritrean Nationalism and national identity of the Eritreans which has keen similarities to that of Ethiopian civic nationalism because of its multi-ethnic nature). In the aftermath of the Shewan Neftenya period that occurred, as a result of feudal lords from Shewa settling in the southern regions, other ethnic groups assimilated into the royal court culture by adopting the Amharic language, Orthodox Christianity, and other aristocratic cultural traits. The Amhara culture-influenced royal court culture dominated throughout the eras of military and monarchic rule. Both peasant Amhara culture and Ethiopian Empire royal court culture have heavily influenced each other; this Ethiopian royal court culture (that influenced and was influenced by Amhara culture) but is separate from traditional peasant Amhara culture, dominated throughout the eras of monarchic and military rule. The difference between the average Amhara people (mostly a peasant class) and high status royal court class (which was multi-ethnic but fluently Amharic-speaking & Christian) are described by Siegfried Pausewang, who stated that: "the term Amhara relates in contemporary Ethiopia to two different and distinct social groups. The ethnic group of the Amhara, mostly a peasant population, is different from a mixed group of urban people coming from different ethnic background, who have adopted Amharic as a common language and identify themselves as Ethiopians". Due to language and certain cultural similarities, the multi-ethnic ruling class of the monarchic and military eras has somewhat erroneously been described as an Amhara ruling class, in addition to the occasionally debated existence of a distinct group called the Amhara people during the time periods in question, has made the terms interchangeable.

=== Opponents ===
Opponents of Ethiopian nationalism claim that it is a political ideology centered on the unification of Ethiopian identity through coercive assimilation into Amhara and Tigrayan culture and (mostly Orthodox) Christian domination. Critics claim that the ideology was promulgated throughout history, from Ethiopian Empire through the Derg era. For more than a century, an assimilated urban Amhara ruling elite used this ideology to pursue an assimilation policy and consolidate power. They view the conflict as having started between Abyssinia, ruled largely by Amhara, Tigrayan, Agew, and northern Oromo ethnic groups, and various subjugated ethnic groups such as southern Oromo, Sidama, and Somali people, among many others. In 1991, Eritrea achieved de facto independence as the Derg collapsed and the TPLF assumed power and created an ethnic-federal state. The Amhara language & culture dominated throughout the eras of military and monarchic rule. Both the Haile Selassie and Derg governments relocated numerous Amhara people into southern Ethiopia including the present-day Oromia Region, where they served in government administration, courts, church and even in schools, where Oromo texts were eliminated and replaced by national Amharic ones. As a result of this assimilation, ethnic tensions surged against the Neftenya system where the Oromo, Somali, and even the Tigray peoples, each of whom had formed separatist movements such as the OLF, TPLF, ELF and ONLF struggled to leave the Ethiopian Empire, which led to the Ethiopian Civil War. The Tigrayans have historically been a part and parcel of the core of Ethiopian identity, along with the Amhara and Agew, and have spoken Amharic alongside their native Tigrinya & Agew for centuries. They follow the same Ethiopian Orthodox faith. Tigrayan nationalism arose out of a conflict with Haile Selassie's regime over some aspects of autonomy, not over ethnicity. Tigrayans have always been Ethiopian nationalists and are ethnically, culturally, and (for the most part) ideologically kin to the Amhara. Ethiopian nationalism has never been opposed by Tigray region historically, and during the rule of Emperor Yohannes that region was the administrative seat of the expanding Ethiopian empire. Oromo ethnic nationalism is more complex, and has deeper historical grievances, and stems from a more distinctly different culture, religion, and language to those of the Christian and Semitic-speaking elite. Oromian regional and Ethiopian civic nationalists have conflicting narratives over the status of Addis Ababa. Oromo ethnic nationalists claim that Addis Ababa should be ceded to Oromia Region and/or led by Oromo people, while Ethiopian civic nationalists believe that it should stay as an independently administered city with leadership open to all people regardless of component ethnicity. The pre-1992 Ethiopian elites had generally perceived strong Oromo identity and languages as hindrances to Ethiopian national identity expansion.

Originating from ancient D'mt, and reaching powerful heights during the Aksumite Empire - which was the first kingdom for their unified civilization and social integration to adopt the name "Ethiopia" under King Ezana's reign, sometime in the 4th century AD. Beginning in 1855, the multi-ethnic Orthodox Christian, Amharic-speaking, ruling elite used Ethiopianism to pursue an assimilation policy and consolidate power. Moreover, the notion of Ethiopian integrity was reinforced by Battle of Adwa, the most important unifying event where Ethiopia defied European colonization by defeating Italy on 2 March 1896.

=== Impact ===
The Second Italo-Ethiopian War and subsequent Italian occupation of Ethiopia was a collective crisis that people of all ethnic groups in Ethiopia experienced. The Italians practiced a divide-and-rule policy, creating ethnic-regional states and a new Shoan region, from where they administered the country for 5 years. The Italians faced fierce resistance during the entirety of that period, and only partial international recognition. Emperor Haile Selassie never signed a peace treaty recognizing Italian domination. After their defeat in 1941, a period of crisis and revolts followed the emperor's restoration to power. Some of these conflicts would that leads to ethnic factions, and later a more intellectual expressed by a student movement. Following the abolition of monarchy and by a military junta Derg in 1974, Ethiopia underwent several conflicts and civil wars, some of which persist to this day. The 28 May 1991 downfall of the Derg by the Ethiopian People's Revolutionary Democratic Front (EPRDF), and its ethnic nationalist policies, let to the creation of large new regional subdivisions based on language and ethnicity. This was necessary for the TPLF to convince the other liberation fronts (OLF, WSLF, ALF, & ONLF) to stay in Ethiopia- instead of all breaking away as Eritrea did (the EPLF was the only front with the military power to do so unilaterally). Despite this compromise saving the now-landlocked Ethiopian polity from disintegration, it has been a force that continues to thwart Ethiopian unity.

== History ==
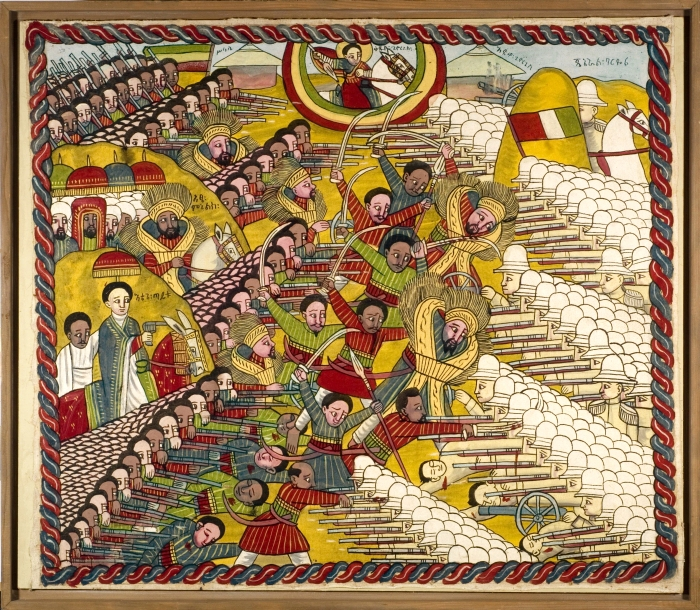
Painting depicting the Battle of Adwa of 1896 where Ethiopian forces were victorious over invading Italian forces. The victory is cherished as an example of Ethiopia upholding its independence against European colonial powers and is annually celebrated in Ethiopia in Victory at Adwa Day.

The origin of the concept of an Ethiopian nation formed by Ethiopian nationalists began with the Aksumite Kingdom in the 4th century A.D. The Aksum was a predominantly Christian state that at the height of its power controlled the northern Ethiopian Highlands, Eritrea, and the coastal regions of Southern Arabia. The Aksumite Kingdom was responsible for the development of the religious movement that became the Ethiopian Orthodox Tewahedo Church. However, the expansion of Islam in the 7th century caused Aksumite Kingdom to decline. Most of the lowland populations converted to Islam, while the highland people remained Christian. Since the Aksumite people were divided between the Christian highlanders and Islamic lowlanders, religious and tribal tensions and rivalries between the people intensified. The Aksumite society morphed into a loose confederation of city-states that maintained the language of Aksum.

The establishment of modern Ethiopia was mainly led by Amhara emperors Tewodros II of Gondar and Menelik II of Shewa. Tewodros governed from 1855 to 1868 and was followed by Yohannes IV, who was from Tigray and was emperor from 1869 to 1889. He managed to expand his authority into Eritrea. Yohannes was followed by Menelik, who governed from 1889 to 1913 and repelled the Italian invasion of 1896.

Ethiopia, unlike the rest of Africa, had never been colonized in the Scramble for Africa. The country was accepted as the first independent African-governed state at the League of Nations in 1922. Ethiopia was occupied by Italy after the Second Italo-Ethiopian War but was liberated by the Allies during World War II.

After the Second World War, Ethiopia annexed Eritrea. However, ethnic tensions peaked between the Amhara and the Eritrean, Oromo, Somali, and Tigray peoples, each of whom had formed separatist movements dedicated to leaving Amhara-dominated Ethiopia. After the overthrow of the Ethiopian monarchy by the Derg military junta, the country became aligned with the Soviet Union and Cuba after the United States failed to support it in its military struggle with Somali separatists in the Ogaden region. After the downfall of the PDRE government in 1991, Eritrea separated from Ethiopia.

== Legacy of independence ==
In March 1896, a definitive battle took place between the forces of colonial Italy and those of the Ethiopian Empire in a north Ethiopian town called Adwa. The battle was short but extremely violent, with tens of thousands of deaths. At the time, Emperor Menelik II had mobilized and conscripted the Ethiopian people, regardless of class and ethnicities. The mobilization drive led millions of Ethiopian citizens to march from their towns, villages, and cities into the Northern Highlands for the preservation of their nation. The battle would end in a decisive victory for Ethiopia, giving the country with a unique legacy of independence in the face of European aggression.

The Battle of Adwa is the foundation of Ethiopian nationalist ideology. For many Ethiopians, the threat of foreign invasion is the rallying cry for patriotic sacrifices and nationalist ideologues. By the time the battle of Adwa took place, almost all of Africa was dominated by European forces. Ethiopian independence broke the mold of European superiority and provided a beacon of hope for African and black nations and peoples around the world. For many Ethiopians, the moment represents a transitional moment, in which the nation realized its teleological doctrine. While the first war against Italy was a uniting war, the 1934 invasion by Benito Mussolini was extremely divisive. Upon observation on the Ethiopian nation, Charles McClellan argues that the Italo-Abyssinian war of 1934 was in fact "as much a civil war as one against foreign aggression." He also argues the political and factional differences which emerged in Ethiopia prior to the war were not resolved by the Italian invasion but instead amplified. This, in the authors' opinion, led to an era of bitter factionalism which would "define the dynamics of post-war Ethiopian politics."

== Era of ethnic federalism ==
The Lion of Judah flag, symbolic representation of Ethiopian Empire under Haile Selassie's administration.

In 1991, the TPLF had gained almost complete control of the national government, leveraging its power to concentrate wealth and development into the Tigray Region. The hegemonic rule of the Tigray people in Ethiopia was in many ways a reaction to the predominance Amharas had in media and governance. The hegemonic rule of a few ethnic groups or in some cases, a single ethnic group has marginalized many groups within Ethiopia and has led to a cycle of violence and retribution. In the early 1990s, the TPLF believed that through an ethnic federalist state system, one in which regions were assigned and divided by the ethnic population, they could:

reduc[e] the inter-ethnic conflict that has divided Ethiopian society for centuries; promot[e] equitable material conditions in all areas of the country; and improv[e] the efficiency and effectiveness of public sector performance at the field level. They argued they could use political and administrative devolution to promote these objectives without threatening other important objectives, such as economic growth and political stability.

While these regions were not given "extensive sub-national control over technical policies, laws, regulations, and tax," their creation lent credibility to the different independence and ethnic nationalist movements around the country. For Ethiopian nationalists, this credibility has emboldened different groups, giving them more cohesion, whilst corroding national unity and notions of Pan-Ethiopianism. The increased autonomy of these groups contrasted with the increased repression by Tigray elites created a situation in which the ruling class was both empowering groups through greater ethnic cohesion, but transparently stifling their political will. As shown by the 2005 elections, the TPLF use of violent repression to subdue detractors of the ruling coalition only had the effect of radicalizing ethnic parties and increasing ethnic divisions. Many Ethiopian nationalists view the system of ethnic federalism as having made governing in Ethiopia a zero-sum game. To win power in Ethiopia is to deny any other ethnic group significant power. By expelling notions of Ethiopianism or multi-ethnic Ethiopian national identity from the national political dialogue, the TPLF has increased the ethnic breaks and created a system revolving around ethnic affiliation, devoid of political ideology. In 2015, after a master plan was unveiled to expand the boundaries of the Ethiopian capital Addis Ababa into Oromia in 2014, thousands of Oromo Youth Liberation Movement members took to the streets to demand increased political representation, an end to the TPLF-sponsored Master Plan, and avenues of dissent. Although the ruling party tried to blunt these protests through physical force, the protests only grew. Amharas "angered by an unfulfilled demand to retake control of some of their lands" launched protests consisting of mostly Oromos and Amharas (but also other Ethiopians) demanding proportional political representation and influence. After a 10-month state of emergency imposed by the TPLF, which saw the abdication of prime minister Hailemariam Desalegn and Abiy Amhed—was selected by the ruling EPDRF coalition as the next prime minister due to his mixed Oromo-Amhara ethnic ancestry with a preference for his Oromo identity. Since Abiy took power, he has taken up major reforms allowing back political dissidents, releasing some political prisoners, and liberalizing the economy. While his drive to reform and democratize the nation has garnered him support across the country, he still has not addressed the fundamental issues of the ethnic federalist system, which in the Pan-Ethiopians' opinion is the root cause for ethno-nationalist politics and tensions. Ethiopian nationalists believe that ethnic federalism must be ended to shift Ethiopian politics from ethnic patronage to ideology, it must be ended to induce national cohesion and blunt sectarian loyalty, and through the blunting of ethnic cohesion induce an era of unity and prosperity.

Abiy and the Prosperity Party have been seen as supporters of Ethiopian civic nationalism due to the merger of the Oromo Democratic Party with the ethnicity-based Amhara Democratic Party, Argoba People's Democratic Organization, Benishangul-Gumuz People's Democratic Unity Front, Ethiopian Somali People's Democratic Party, Gambela People's Democratic Movement, Afar National Democratic Party, Hareri National League, and the Southern Ethiopian People's Democratic Movement political parties into the new multi-ethnic Prosperity Party, thus moving these predecessor parties away from their ethnic nationalist and pro-ethnic federalism past into a party that promotes Ethiopian national identity, and non-ethnicity based federalism. All of these goals are seen by opponents as steps towards taking political powers based on group rights away from the various ethnic groups. Proponents of the merger see it as a way to move Ethiopian politics and governmental administration away from ethnicity-based identity politics, supporting the individual rights of each person. This outlook more intensely mitigates rising ethnic nationalism, fosters national unity and solidarity, and creates inclusive democratic process involving political parties of several ethnic groups and regions that were once deemed too inferior by the Tigray People's Liberation Front-led Ethiopian People's Revolutionary Democratic Front regime. Eventually, proponents hope to see the transition a to one-party dominated coalition government or be full partakers in revolutionary democracy because of their largely pastoralist way of life.

== See also ==
- Ethiopian Empire
- Ethiopianism
- Neftenya

== Bibliography ==
- Motyl, Alexander J. (2001). Encyclopedia of Nationalism, Volume II. Academic Press. ISBN 0-12-227230-7.
