= 2026 Ethiopian general election =

- 1 June 2026
- 486 of the 547 seats in the House of Peoples' Representatives; 274 seats needed for a majority
- Turnout: 95.70%
Party	Leader	Seats	+/–
Prosperity Party	Abiy Ahmed	438	−19
EZEMA	Eyob Mesafint	13	+9
NaMA	Belete Molla	6	+1
ADFM	Getaye Syabnew	3	+3
Medrek	Merera Gudina	3	+3
FEP	Abulqadir Adem	3	+3
CUD		2	New
APP	Musa Adem	1	+1
ANDO	Mohamed Musa	1	New
GPDP	Alesa Mengesha	1	−1
GNM		1	New
NGP	Solomon Tafesse	1	+1
ONLF	Abdukarim Sheh Muse	1	+1
PEC	Simon Tut	1	New
SFP	Yusuf Hussein	1	New
UDJ	Birtukan Mideksa	1	New
WPDM		1	New
Independents	–	8	+4
This lists parties that won seats. See the complete results below.
Prime Minister before	Prime Minister after
Abiy Ahmed; Prosperity Party	Abiy Ahmed; Prosperity Party

General elections were held in Ethiopia on 1 June 2026 to elect members of the House of Peoples' Representatives. The ruling Prosperity Party of prime minister Abiy Ahmed won a majority of 438 seats.

Ongoing conflicts left many Ethiopians unable to vote, including those in the entire Tigray Region, which was still recovering from the Tigray war.

== Background ==
Concerns over government suppression of opposition and possible plans by Abiy Ahmed to amend the constitution and switch the country to a presidential system to stay in power were made prior to the election.

The National Election Board of Ethiopia (NEBE) published an updated list of electoral constituencies on 30 January 2026.

== Electoral system ==
The members of the House of Peoples' Representatives are elected in single-member constituencies using the first-past-the-post system. The voters elect 547 representatives, and the party that wins at least 274 seats can form the government for the next 5 years.

According to NEBE, over 50.5 million people have registered to vote in the election.

== Candidates ==
There are 47 parties and more than 10,900 candidates, including 2,198 for the federal parliament, 8,736 for regional and city councils and 73 independents, contesting in the election.

== Campaign ==
The Prosperity Party campaigned on its economic record, particularly improved food security and economic growth. Opposition parties accused the federal government of arresting their leaders and obstructing their political activities through legal maneuvers.

== Conduct ==
Election day was declared a national holiday as part of efforts to encourage turnout. Polling was being held in 48,000 precincts nationwide, with the procedure running from 06:00 to 18:00 (EAT). Voting was not held in Tigray Region as well as in 8 constituencies in Amhara Region due to concerns of interference by the Fano militia. NEBE cited "unfavourable conditions" following the Tigray war and subsequent political instability for not holding the election in Tigray. Also, voting was not held in some constituencies in Oromia Region "due to security problems", following fighting between the government and the Oromo Liberation Army. Security incidents were reported in Amhara and Oromia Regions, with voting interrupted in at least 143 polling stations.

House of Peoples' Representatives
Region	Total seats	Elected on 1 June 2026	No election
Addis Abeba	23	23	—
Afar	8	8	—
Amhara	138	130	8
Benishangul-Gumuz	9	9	—
Central Ethiopia	35	33	2
Dire Dawa	2	2	—
Gambela	3	3	—
Harari	2	2	—
Oromia	178	173	5
Sidama	19	16	3
Somali	23	22	1
South West Ethiopia	20	20	—
South Ethiopia	49	45	4
Tigray	38	—	38
Total	547	486	61
source=

== Results ==
On 6 June, out of the targeted 1,138 constituencies, about 825 constituencies had declared election results, according to NEBE Chairperson Melatwork Hailu without providing further details.

=== House of Peoples' Representatives ===
On June 21, NEBE announced that with 90% of constituencies that declared election results, the Prosperity Party won 438 seats in federal parliament, securing a majority. EZEMA secured 13 seats, while the National Movement of Amhara took six seats. Medrek and the Freedom and Equality Party each won three seats, while the Coalition for Unity and Democracy won two seats. Independent candidates secured eight seats. The reported turnout was 94%.

Party	Votes	%	Seats
Prosperity Party			438
Ethiopian Citizens for Social Justice			13
National Movement of Amhara			6
Amhara Democratic Force Movement			3
Medrek			3
Freedom and Equality Party			3
Coalition for Unity and Democracy			2
Afar People's Party			1
Argoba Nationality Democratic Organization			1
Gedeo People's Democratic Party			1
Gumuz National Movement			1
New Generation Party			1
Ogaden National Liberation Front			1
Peace for Ethiopia Coalition			1
Somali Federalist Party			1
Unity for Democracy and Justice			1
Wolaita People's Democratic Movement			1
Independents			8
Vacant			61
Total			547
Valid votes	51,413,412	99.38	
Invalid/blank votes	320,781	0.62	
Total votes	51,734,193	100.00	
Registered voters/turnout	54,057,861	95.70	

== Tigray Region ==
After the election, following the 2026 Ethiopian offensive starting in late September 2026, a new Interim Regional Administration of Tigray was established with the intention of supporting a NEBE-supervised regional election in Tigray by April 2027.

== See also ==
- Elections in Ethiopia
