= Afar National Democratic Party =

Afar National Democratic Party Qafar Agatih Dimokraasih Barti
- Founded: 1999
- Dissolved: 1 December 2019
- Merger of: Afar Liberation Front; Afar People's Democratic Organization; Afar National Liberation Front; Afar Revolutionary Democratic Unity Front; Afar National Democratic Movement
- Merged into: Prosperity Party
- Ideology: Afar interests

The Afar National Democratic Party (Amharic: የአፋር ብሔራዊ ዴሞክራሲያዊ ፓርቲ, ANDP; Afar: Qafar Agatih Dimokraasih Barti, QADB) was a political party in Ethiopia. At the legislative elections held on 15 May 2005, the party won 8 seats, all from the Afar Region. The current Minister of Social Affairs and the Deputy Chairman of Pastoralist Affairs are members of the party.

It was reported that the ANDP was created in the latter half of 1999 from a merger of the Afar Liberation Front (ALF) and the Afar People's Democratic Organization with three smaller organizations—the Afar National Liberation Front, the Afar Revolutionary Democratic Unity Front (ARDUF) and the Afar National Democratic Movement. However, there have been more recent reports indicating that the ALF and ARDUF continued operate as independent organizations.

In the August 2005 Regional assembly elections, the party won 84 out of 87 seats in the Afar Region.

In December 2019, the party merged with the Amhara Democratic Party (ADP), the Benishangul-Gumuz People's Democratic Unity Front (BGPDUF), the Ethiopian Somali People's Democratic Party (ESPDP), the Gambela People's Democratic Movement (GPDM), the Hareri National League (HNL), the Oromo Democratic Party (ODP) and the Southern Ethiopian People's Democratic Movement (SEPDM) to form the Prosperity Party.
