= Coalition of Ethiopian Civil Society Organizations for Elections =

Ethiopian civil society election-observation coalition

- Abbreviation: CECOE
- Formation: 2019; 7 years ago
- Founded at: Addis Ababa, Ethiopia
- Type: Civil society coalition
- Purpose: Election observation, voter education
- Headquarters: Addis Ababa, Ethiopia
- Region served: Ethiopia
- Executive Director: Abera Hailemariam

The Coalition of Ethiopian Civil Society Organizations for Elections (CECOE) is an Ethiopian umbrella coalition of civil society organizations established in 2019 to coordinate citizen election observation, voter education and the prevention of post-electoral conflict.

== History and activities ==
CECOE was formed in 2019. In the same year, it deployed a group of trained citizen observers to Sidama statehood referendum. During the 2021 sixth general elections, it deployed several thousand long and short-term observers across the country's regions and city administrations, coordinated voter-education campaigns and carried out media monitoring. The African Union Election Observation Mission and a joint report by the International Republican Institute and the National Democratic Institute identified CECOE as the most prominent of the domestic observer groups in the 2021 elections.

The coalition has since observed further votes, including a 2023 referendum in the Southern Nations, Nationalities, and Peoples' Region, and in 2025 published a monitoring report on the appointment process for new members of the National Election Board of Ethiopia. For the country's seventh general election in 2026 it deployed 2,506 stationary and 867 mobile observers drawn from 101 member organisations, monitoring around 7,723 polling stations. Its observation work has been supported by international partners including the National Democratic Institute and the Deutsche Gesellschaft für Internationale Zusammenarbeit (GIZ).
