= Benishangul-Gumuz People's Democratic Unity Front =

Former political party in Ethiopia (1996–2019)

- Founded: 1996
- Dissolved: 1 December 2019
- Merged into: Prosperity Party
- Ideology: Minority politics

The Benishangul-Gumuz People's Democratic Unity Front (BGPDUF; Amharic: የቤኒሻንጉልና ጉሙዝ ሕዝቦች ዴሞክራሲዊ አንድነት ግንባር) was a political party in Ethiopia. In the 2010 elections, the BGPDUF won 9 seats. In local elections held the same day, the BGPDUF won 98 of the 99 seats in the Benishangul-Gumuz parliament.

The BGPDUF emerged from a 1996 conference led by the former Deputy Prime Minister Tamrat Layne. Previous to the conference, relations between the dominant Ethiopian People's Revolutionary Democratic Front (EPRDF) and its partner, the Benishangul People's Liberation Movement (BPLM) had grown strained, and the BPLM was ineffective due to internal factionalism. The conference announced its members had agreed that "all the parties should evaluate and cleanse themselves of 'OLF sympathisers', 'supporters of Sudanese interventionists' and 'corrupt officials'". Whereupon, under the direction of EPRDF cadres, members of not only the BPLM but the other five ethnic-based parties in the Benishangul-Gumuz Region, submitted to a grueling session of gimgema or self-criticism; those who were found to have admitted their weaknesses satisfactorily were allowed to enroll in the new parties being formed. As Asnake Kefale Adegehe explains:

First, the BPLM, which had had a pan-regional claim was reduced to the Bertha and was renamed the EBPDO. Second, the two distinct ethnic parties that claimed to represent; the Mao and the Komo were merged to establish the Mao-Komo People's Democratic Organisation (MKPDO). The Gumuz and Boro-Shinasha ethnic parties remained without much change. The four organisations were then brought together to form a new front modelled after the EPRDF and named the BGPDUF.

== Previous election results ==
In the 2005 elections, the party won 8 seats, all from the Benishangul-Gumuz Region. The Deputy Chairman of Natural Resources and Environmental Protection Affairs Committee in the following session of the Ethiopian Parliament was a member of the BGDUF.

In the 2000 Regional assembly elections, the BGDUF won 71 of 80 seats in Benishangul-Gumuz parliament. In the August 2005 Regional assembly elections, the party won 85 out of 99 seats in the Benishangul-Gumuz. In the 2008 by-elections for the Regional legislature, the BGPDUF won 5 seats.

In December 2019, the party merged with the Afar National Democratic Party (ANDP), the Amhara Democratic Party (ADP), the Ethiopian Somali People's Democratic Party (ESPDP), the Gambela People's Democratic Movement (GPDM), the Hareri National League (HNL), the Oromo Democratic Party (ODP) and the Southern Ethiopian People's Democratic Movement (SEPDM) to form the Prosperity Party.
