= Enat Party =

Political party in Ethiopia

Enat Party እናት ፓርቲ
- First Secretary: Getnet Worku
- Deputy President: Seife Selassie Ayalew
- Founded: 2019
- Registered: January 2021
- Ideology: Social democracy; Liberalism; Conservativism; Ethiopian nationalism

Enat Party (Amharic: እናት ፓርቲ) is a political party in Ethiopia founded in 2019. After its registration by National Election Board of Ethiopia (NEBE), the party grew its popularity behind the Prosperity Party and Ethiopian Citizens for Social Justice and emerged as opposition group. According to the party's Deputy President Seife Selassie Ayalew, "Enat party proposes a philosophy comprised of conservatism, social democracy and liberalism". In addition to these ideologies, Enat holds its position of historical form of Ethiopian nationalism with moderate Western political philosophies.

== History ==
Enat Party was established in 2019 with Getnet Worku serving the first secretary general. The party was registered as a political party by the National Election Board of Ethiopia (NEBE) in January 2021, becoming the biggest party behind the Prosperity Party and Ethiopian Citizens for Social Justice with 583 candidates. According to its Deputy President Seife Selassie Ayalew, "Enat party proposes a philosophy comprised of conservatism, social democracy and liberalism". It does not believe in single political and economic philosophy. The party stemmed its ideology from historical background of Ethiopian nationalism embraced by the Western nations.

The party is one of the most prime parties positioning itself as an opposition along with All Ethiopian Unity Party (AEUP), Ethiopian People's Revolutionary Party (EPRP), Amhara Ghinoians Movement and One Ethiopia Democratic Party. On 6 March 2023, Enat Party announced that it did not hold party congress auditorium because of the government repression pressured hindrance toward the party's access to logistics. According to the party, three reservations were cancelled. The first one was public venue supposed to be under the Ministry of Culture and Sports in Sidist Kilo area, the second was in Kirkos district through the arrangement of Political Parties Joint Council but was shortly cancelled within 48 hours before party congress that was supposed to be attended by 700 participants across the country. The party did not specify the reason behind the cancellation. The third one was seemingly due to the government threat to broaden its political space.
