= Balderas Party =

Political party in Ethiopia

Balderas Party Balderas for Genuine Democracy Party Balderas for True Democracy Party ባልደራስ ፓርቲ
- President: Amaha Dagnew
- Chairperson: Eskinder Nega (2019–2022)
- Founder: Eskinder Nega
- Founded: September 2019
- Headquarters: Addis Ababa
- Ideology: Ethiopian nationalism Liberalism
- Seats in House of Peoples' Representatives: 5 / 547

Website
- Official website

Balderas Party (Amharic: ባልደራስ ፓርቲ), also called Balderas for Genuine Democracy Party or Balderas for True Democracy Party, is a political party in Ethiopia founded by political activist Eskinder Nega in 2019.

== History ==
Balderas Party was founded in September 2019 by political activist Eskinder Nega as Balderas for Genuine Democracy. Initially, the party was founded as a civic society for safeguarding economic and social rights of Addis Ababa residents. The party has been vocal in its criticism of the Ethiopian government and has faced numerous obstacles in its efforts to participate in the country's political process.

In April 2021, Balderas wrote and electoral manifesto that reveal policy measures on the upcoming election in 2021. Balderas and the National Movement of Amhara formed alliance in mid-2021 to end what they call the supposed hateful narratives and hate speech politics in Ethiopia.

In the 2021 general elections, Balderas rejected the results in Addis Ababa, claiming widespread irregularities and flaws in the voting process.The party conducted its own research and compiled a 30-page document detailing alleged harassments, intimidations, and physical abuse of its members, representatives, and observers at polling stations throughout the city.

Furthermore, Balderas and its members have faced significant repression from the government. In March and April 2022, at least 30 members and leaders of the party were arrested while celebrating public holidays in Addis Ababa. Although they were released without charge days later, such incidents highlight the ongoing challenges faced by opposition parties in Ethiopia.

Balderas also faced numerous obstacles in its attempts to organize and hold meetings. The government has been accused of using scare tactics to prevent the party from gathering, including detaining prominent party leaders and harassing business venues that might host meetings. These actions have made it difficult for Balderas to hold its mandatory general assembly meeting, which is required to finalize its national status

On 11 August 2022, Eskinder left the party chairmanship citing the government repression.

== Leadership ==
- Eskinder Nega (Chairman: 2019–2022)
- Amaha Dagnew (Deputy President)
