= Western Somali Democratic Party =

Political party in Ethiopia

- Chairperson: Hassan Jire Kalinle (from 1994); Joseph Nur
- Founded: 1975
- Split from: JXSG
- Ideology: Somali nationalism

Western Somali Democratic Party (WSDP; also known as Somali Galbed) is a political party in Ethiopia. It emerged from the Western Somali Liberation Front in 1975. The former President of the Somali Region, Hassan Jire Kalinle, has been the party chairman since 1994; the vice chairman of the party is Joseph Nur.

In the 2005 regional elections, the WSDP won one seat (of 182) in the legislature of the Somali Region. In 2000, it had won three out of 168 seats. The principal strongholds of the WSDP's support is around Jigjiga, Kebri Dahar and Warder. In the 1995 elections, the WSDP won 15 of the 135 seats in the regional parliament and one of the 25 seats assigned to the Somali Region.
