= Gedeo People's Democratic Party =

Political party in Ethiopia

Gedeo People's Democratic Party የጌዲዮን ህዝቦች ዲሞክራሲያዊ ፓርቲ
- Abbreviation: GPDP
- President: Alesa Mengesha
- Chairperson: Alesa Mengesha
- Founded: 1992
- Banned: 22 October 2024
- Split from: Southern Ethiopia Peoples' Democratic Coalition
- Headquarters: Addis Ababa; Dila
- Ideology: Gedeo nationalism
- Seats in House of Peoples' Representatives: 2 / 547

The Gedeo People's Democratic Party (Amharic: የጌዲዮን ህዝቦች ዲሞክራሲያዊ ፓርቲ, GPDP), also formerly known as Gedeo People's Democratic Organization (GPDO), is a political party in Ethiopia founded in 1992 as part of the Southern Ethiopia Peoples' Democratic Coalition which includes several ethnic-based parties. As a proponent of ethnic federalism, the GPDP represents interests of the Gedeo people in response to perceived discrimination and marginalization against the people due to ethnic conflicts and environmental crises. It is an opposition group of the ruling party Prosperity Party with no party leader.

In the 2021 Ethiopian general election, GPDP won two seats in the House of Peoples' Representatives as well as 14 seats in SNNPR regional council, making the largest legislative body in the region.

On 22 October 2024, the National Election Board of Ethiopia suspended the GPDP and prohibited them from engaging in any political activities or being nominated in elections for non-compliance.
