= Freedom and Equality Party (Ethiopia) =

Political party in Ethiopia

Freedom and Equality Party ነጻነትና እኩልነት ፓርቲ
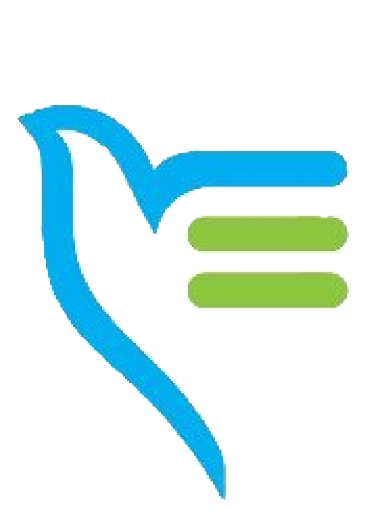
- Chairperson: Abulqadir Adem
- Founder: Abulqadir Adem
- Founded: 2019
- Headquarters: South Africa St, Addis Ababa, Ethiopia
- Ideology: Moderate liberalism
- Political position: Center
- Seats in House of Peoples' Representatives: 3 / 547
- Seats in Somali Regional Council: 12 / 252
- Seats in Amhara Regional Council: 1 / 277
- Seats in South Ethiopia Regional State Council: 2 / 224

Party flag
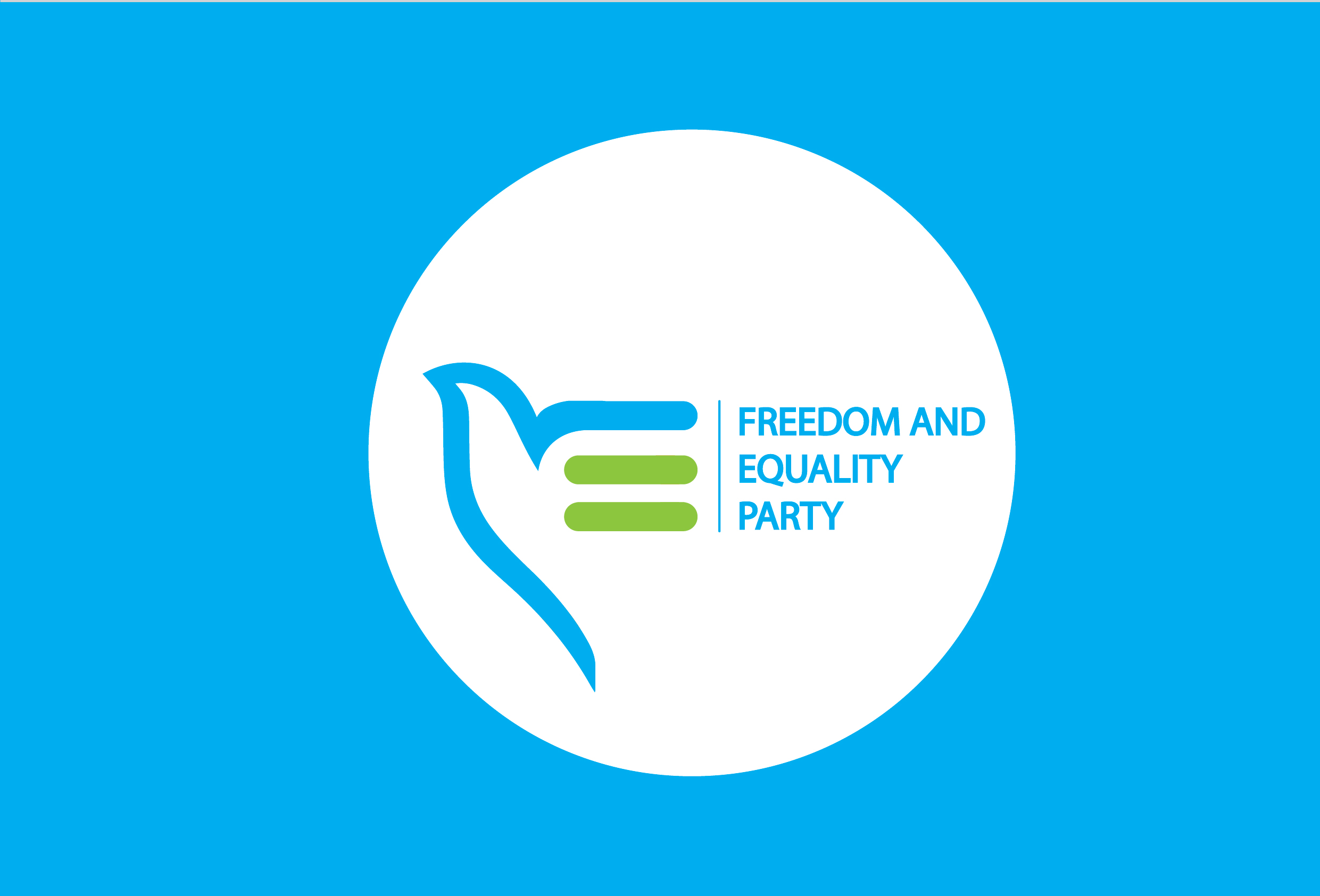

Website
- www.fepethiopia.com

The Freedom and Equality Party (Amharic: ነጻነትና እኩልነት ፓርቲ, FEP) is an Ethiopian moderate liberal political party founded in 2019 by Abulkadir Adem, who is the current chair of the party. It is one of eight recognized parties in Ethiopia which registered as a national party, and major opposition to the ruling party, Prosperity Party.

== History ==
The Freedom and Equality Party (FEP) was founded in 2019 by Abulkadir Adem, who is the current chairman of the party. Before that, the party was part of the Ethiopian Citizens for Social Justice (EZEMA), which participated in 2021 general election. In the election, the party won 1 seats in the House of Peoples' Representatives (HoPR) and 4 seats in the Oromia Regional Council, which is the largest legislative body in Ethiopia. The party is currently an opposition to the ruling party Prosperity Party. On 21 September 2021, the Somali branch of FEP and EZEMA announced its withdrawal 6th round of national elections after the Ogaden National Liberation Front (ONLF) withdrew before nine days before ballot day. With the same assumption of EZEMA, FEP also decided to join the ONLF in withdrawing from elections.

== See also ==
- 2021 Ethiopian general election
