= Prosperity Party =

Political party in Ethiopia

Prosperity Party: ብልጽግና ፓርቲ (Amharic); Paartii Badhaadhiinaa (Oromo); Xisbiga Barwaaqo (Somali); ውድብ ብልፅግና (Tigrinya); Leedâ Missoyna (Afar)
- President: Abiy Ahmed
- Vice-Presidents: Adem Farah; Temesgen Tiruneh
- Founded: 1 December 2019 (6 years, 332 days)
- Merger of: ADP; ANDP; APDO; BGPDUF; SDP; GPDM; HNL; ODP; SEPDM
- Preceded by: EPRDF
- Headquarters: Addis Ababa
- Newspaper: New Vision
- Membership (2022): ▲11,000,000+
- Ideology: Economic liberalism; Civic nationalism; Moderate progressivism; Populism
- Political position: Centre
- House of Peoples' Representatives: 457 / 547 Nebe, Nebe

Website
- prosperity.org.et

The Prosperity Party (Amharic: ብልጽግና ፓርቲ, romanized: Bilits'igina Paritī; Oromo: Paartii Badhaadhiinaa) is a political party in Ethiopia that was established on 1 December 2019 as a successor to the Ethiopian People's Revolutionary Democratic Front by Prime Minister Abiy Ahmed. It is the ruling party of Ethiopia.

The merger into a countrywide party is part of Abiy's general policy of distancing the country's politics from ethnic federalism. The party ran for the first time in the 2021 general election.

== History ==
After being elected in 2018, Ethiopian Prime Minister Abiy Ahmed began carrying out significant reforms that aimed to merge Ethiopia's ethnic parties and reduce the influence of the Tigray Peoples Liberation Front (TPLF), as the organization had dominated the ruling Ethiopian People's Revolutionary Democratic Front (EPRDF) political coalition since the fall of the Derg regime in 1991.

The Prosperity Party (PP) was formed and formally recognized by the National Electoral Board of Ethiopia (NEBE) in December 2019 through the merging of three member parties of the EPRDF. These were the Amhara Democratic Party (ADP), the Oromo Democratic Party (ODP) and the Southern Ethiopian People's Democratic Movement (SEPDM). Also included in the merger was the Afar National Democratic Party (ANDP), the Benishangul-Gumuz People's Democratic Unity Front (BGPDUF), the Ethiopian Somali People's Democratic Party (ESPDP), the Gambela People's Democratic Movement (GPDM) and the Hareri National League (HNL). The merger was approved by the executive committee of the EPRDF. In November 2019 Abiy tweeted:

The unanimous decision passed today to merge the Party is a crucial step in harnessing our energy to work toward a shared vision. Prosperity Party is committed to strengthening & applying a true Federal system which recognizes the diversity and contributions of all Ethiopians.

Notably, the powerful Tigrayan Peoples Liberation Front viewed the merger as illegal and was not party to it. Abiy directly called on the TPLF to dissolve and become part of the Prosperity Party, which precipitated the TPLF shifting its personnel and resources from the nation's capital of Addis Ababa to the Tigray regional state capital of Mekelle during 2020.

== Program and ideology ==
The Prosperity Party has been seen as supporting Ethiopian civic nationalism due to the merger of the Oromo Democratic Party with the Amhara Democratic Party, Argoba People's Democratic Organization, Benishangul-Gumuz People's Democratic Unity Front, Ethiopian Somali People's Democratic Party, Gambela People's Democratic Movement, Afar National Democratic Party, Hareri National League, and the Southern Ethiopian People's Democratic Movement ethnicity-based political parties into the new multi-ethnic party, thus moving these predecessor parties away from their ethnic nationalist and pro-ethnic federalism past into a party that promotes a unified Ethiopian national identity and non-ethnicity based federalism. However, this has been seen by opponents as steps towards the possibility of taking political powers based on group rights away from the various ethnic groups, while proponents see it as a way to move Ethiopian politics and governmental administration away from ethnicity-based identity politics, supporting the individual rights of each person, to mitigate the rise of ethnic nationalism, to foster national unity and solidarity, and to include in the democratic process political parties of several ethnic groups and regions that were once deemed unfit by the TPLF-led Ethiopian People's Revolutionary Democratic Front to fully join the one-party dominated coalition government or be full partakers in revolutionary democracy because of their largely pastoralist way of life.

With the formation of the Prosperity Party in 2019, Abiy Ahmed promised to redress the marginal status of the regional states in the Ethiopian periphery. Satellite parties that represented so-called 'emerging' regions, including Afar, Somali, Benishangul-Gumuz and Gambella, were promised equal representation and became part of the ruling PP.

=== Symbols ===
The party's logo consists of two black hands holding three human figures (one blue, one yellow, and one pink), with sun rays shooting outwards from the human figures.

== Internal organisation and ethnic tensions within the party ==
The Prosperity Party (PP) exists along ethnic lines. There is an Amhara PP (APP), an Oromo PP (OPP), a Somali PP (SPP), a Sidama PP (SPP), and a Tigrayan PP, led by Nebiyou Shulmichael and of which Abraham Belay and Mulu Nega are prominent members. Many other ethnic groups have their own PP branch as well. There exists a substantial divide between the Oromo and Amhara wings of the party, with academic Tobias Hagmann noting that the two sides are largely kept together through opposition to the TPLF.

The Tigrayan PP is in strong conflict with the TPLF as it has supported Abiy Ahmed in the Tigray War. Due to this war, the Tigray PP has become isolated in Tigrayan public opinion to the point that one of the regional PP leaders, Abraham Belay, was forbidden by his own mother to visit her house and her neighbourhood. In March 2021, the Oromia Prosperity Party (OPP) and Amhara Prosperity Party (APP) came with opposite statements, each blaming the other for being the cause of violence and killings.

== Criticism ==
The Prosperity Party has been increasingly accused of spreading anti-intellectualism as well as the cult of personality of premier and party chief Abiy Ahmed, dubbed the "Prosperity Party Gospel", a term evoking the prosperity gospel philosophy. Its members also accused of propagating fallacious statements regardless of reality behind the current Ethiopian situation such as periodical intrastate conflicts. The party has been criticised for jailing political opponents, intimidating critics, and restricting media freedom.

The Prosperity Party has also faced criticism over the conduct and inclusiveness of the 2026 Ethiopian general election. The election was held without voting in the Tigray Region for a second consecutive general election, leaving the region without representation in the federal parliament since 2020. Critics argued that the exclusion of Tigray undermined the inclusiveness of the electoral process and further marginalized the region politically.

International media outlets, election analysts and opposition parties also questioned the credibility of the election because of the exclusion of Tigray, insecurity that prevented voting in parts of the Amhara and Oromia regions, the imprisonment or absence of prominent opposition figures, and allegations of intimidation and restrictions on political competition. Other observers noted that the inability to hold voting across significant parts of the country, including the entire Tigray region and the limited participation of major opposition groups raised broader questions about the legitimacy and representativeness of the electoral process.

== Election results ==
=== House of Peoples' Representatives elections ===
Election	Leader	Votes	%	Seats	+/–	Rank	Government
2021	Abiy Ahmed	30,018,782	89.18%	457 / 473	▼43	1st	Supermajority
2026	Abiy Ahmed	N/A	N/A	438 / 486	▼19	1st	Supermajority
