= Ethiopian Social Democratic Party =

Political party in Ethiopia

- Abbreviation: ESDP
- Chairperson: Beyene Petros
- Secretary: Alema Koira
- Vice chairperson: Mulu Meja
- Founded: 1998
- Headquarters: Jijiga, Somali Region
- Ideology: Social democracy
- Political position: Center-left
- National affiliation: UEDF (2005)

The Ethiopian Social Democratic Party (Amharic: ኢትዮጵያ ማህበረ-ዴሞክራሲ ፌደራላዊ ፓርቲ, ESDP) is a political party in Ethiopia. As of 2005 the leaders of the ESDP are chairman Beyene Petros, vice chairman Rahel Bafe, and secretary Alema Koira.

During the 2005 elections, which were held in 15 May of that year, the party was part of the United Ethiopian Democratic Forces, which won 52 out of 527 seats in the Council of People's Representatives.

Beyene Petros announced in February 2006 that the party would change its name from Ethiopian Social Democratic Federal Party to the Ethiopian Social Democratic Party, emphasizing its connections with the European Social democratic movement.
