= Ethnic federalism =

Form of federalism

Ethnic federalism, multi-ethnic or multi-national federalism, is a form of federal system in which the federated regional or state units are defined by ethnicity. Ethnic federal systems have been created in attempts to accommodate demands for ethnic autonomy and manage inter-ethnic tensions within a state. They have not always succeeded in this: problems inherent in the construction and maintenance of an ethnic federation have led to some states or sub-divisions of a state into either breaking up or resorting to authoritarian repression, ethnocracy, ethnic segregation, population transfer, internal displacement, ethnic cleansing, and/or ethnicity-based attacks and pogroms.

This type of federation was implemented from 1994 to 2018 by Meles Zenawi in Ethiopia. Meles Zenawi and his government adopted ethnic federalism with the aim of establishing the equality of all ethnic groups in Ethiopia. Features of ethnic federalism are displayed also in other countries, including Belgium, Bosnia, Canada, India, Nepal, Pakistan, Spain, South Sudan, and in the past Czechoslovakia, Yugoslavia, the Soviet Union, and Apartheid-era South Africa (see Bantustans).

== General perspectives ==
=== Definition ===
In an ethnic federation some or all of the federated units are constructed as far as possible to follow ethnic boundaries, providing ethnic communities with a measure of autonomy. Because the federation remains one state, this is distinguished from outright partition. Such a system may be considered in nations where ethnic groups are concentrated in geographical localities.

In an ethnoterritorial federation—a "compromise model"—the largest ethnic group is divided among more than one subunit. Examples include Canada, India and Spain. This type of system may be appropriate for nations that contain one dominant group.

=== Motivation ===
One of the main motivations for introducing ethnic federalism is to reduce conflict among the groups within the state, by granting each group local self-government and guaranteed representation at the centre. Thus an ethnic federal system may have particular appeal where serious conflict is feared or has already occurred. This goal is "defensive" and accepts the permanence of different ethnic identities within the state.

Federalism allows ethnically diverse groups a level of autonomy, protected by a constitution that prescribes the powers of the central government in relation to those of the federated units. As the units are delineated such that each ethnic group forms a local majority in one or more of them, it is hoped to reduce fears of unequal treatment or oppression by the state government, and enable each group to express and develop its own cultural identity within its homeland.

The federal constitution will also provide for representation of all the regional ethnic units in the central government, enabling peaceful arbitration of the claims of different groups. In this respect the success of the system relies upon the willingness of the elites of different ethnic groups to cooperate at state level to provide stable government.

=== Criticism ===
Ethnic federalism as an institutional choice to alleviate ethnic tensions within a country has often been criticised, both on conceptual and empirical grounds. At the theoretical level the difficulties include:

- The problematic concept of "ethnicity" as an ordering principle. Consciousness of ethnic identity may develop or harden within a political system structured along ethnic lines, and may be mobilised for political advantage.
- Difficulties drawing the boundaries: complete ethnic homogeneity is rarely found within any territory in multi-ethnic states. As a result, new minorities are likely to be created within the subunits, who may be or feel in danger of being victimized, and may destabilise the federal system with ongoing demands for their own subunits.
- The functioning of the system once established: "redefining politics along ethnic lines tends to transform everything into an ethnic issue". In some conditions the federal system may result in "ethnicizing group identities and giving rise to or exacerbating, instead of alleviating, ethnic conflict at the subnational level". The power-sharing arrangements at the centre tend to lead to paralysis, while politicians or parties representing the different groups may seek to enhance their political position by refusing compromise. In most cases, however, ethnic divisions within a state are pre-existing and are not initiated by the establishment of an ethnic federation.
- Tendency for secession. Instability and the pressure for secession are likely to increase once the groups within a country are provided with resources, legitimacy and an independent power base. The federal structures may enable the regional groups to build up economic, political and even military strength, leading to the ultimate collapse of these states under ethnic tension. People will increasingly identify with the regional subunit rather than the federation as a whole, thus threatening the unity of the state.
- In cases of severe hostility and conflict, ethnic federalism does not go far enough in separating rival groups, and partition may prove to be necessary.

It is also noted that in practice ethnic federations have frequently failed: but it is rarely clear how far this is because ethnic federalism is a misconceived institutional form or because of the inherent difficulties in running a state with deep ethnic divisions ("overwhelmingly, those states that adopt ethnofederalism do so because alternatives have been tried already, and have failed"). Anderson (2013) cites among the failures: Eastern Europe (the Soviet Union, Czechoslovakia, and Yugoslavia), Africa (the East African Federation and Ethiopia-Eritrea), the Caribbean region (the Federation of the West Indies), and Asia (Pakistan and Malaya-Singapore). As ethnic federations still in being he points to Belgium (not a pure case), Ethiopia (not democratic), and Bosnia-Herzegovina (whose future prospects are questionable).

== Ethnic federalism in specific countries ==
=== Ethiopia ===
A map of the regions and zones of Ethiopia

Ethiopia has over 80 ethno-linguistic groups and a long history of ethnic conflict. After 17 years of armed struggle, in 1991 Meles Zenawi's party replaced the Derg (the Mengistu Haile Mariam-led military dictatorship in Ethiopia). Zenawi, up to then leader of the Tigray People's Liberation Front (TPLF) and the Ethiopian People's Revolutionary Democratic Front (EPRDF), wished to end what he imagined was a dominance of the Amharas of Shewa. A new constitution was introduced in 1994, dividing Ethiopia on ethnic lines into nine regional states and two multiethnic "chartered administrations" (Addis Ababa and Dire Dawa). Ethnic groups received rights to self-government: the states were given autonomy in legislative, executive and judicial functions, while there were provisions for ethnic groups to be represented in central institutions. Ethnic groups were granted the "unconditional right" to secession, although it is doubtful whether any group could in fact achieve this. The government was aiming not only to reduce inter-ethnic conflict but to equalise living standards in different areas and improve the working of public institutions locally.

There are different views on the success of the system. The country was described by a visitor in 2011 as "at peace, progressing towards prosperity". The federal system produced stability relative to the previous situation of conflict between a centralised state and ethnically based "liberation fronts", and the government has claimed that previously marginalised groups have benefited from the arrangement.

In practice the autonomy of the regional states has been limited by the centralised and authoritarian nature of the ruling political party, the EPRDF, which has encroached on regional affairs and thus lost its legitimacy as a "neutral broker". The system, while aiming to establish the equality of ethnic groups in Ethiopia, has been found to harden ethnic identities ("The distinction between affective and political communities disappears ... when ethnic group identity serves not just as a source of affectivity but also as a source of political identification") and to promote inter-ethnic conflicts, especially in ethnically mixed areas. Inter-ethnic conflict has dramatically increased since the accession to power of Abiy Ahmed in 2018. The system has given rise to demands for further separate ethnic territories.

According to political analyst Teshome Borago, "Zenawism" contradicts the political philosophy behind the African Union, in that every African nation agreed to keep the colonial boundaries after independence despite multiple tribes being placed together within national borders. In contrast, Zenawism is accused of promoting separatism and irredentism and may encourage African tribes to aim for their own independent states.

=== Nepal ===
The ethnic aspect of a new federal structure in Nepal has been a source of contention through the constitution-building process of recent years. Multiparty democracy was introduced in Nepal in 1990 after a popular uprising led by the Congress party and the United Left Front, a coalition of communist parties. Ethnic issues did not emerge prominently in the drafting of the new constitution. Campaigns for more recognition of ethnic issues were led by Nepal Federation of Indigenous Nationalities (NEFIN) representing the ethnic groups of the hills, the regional Sadbhawana party of the Terai, and the UCPN (Maoists) under pressure from the Madhesi people of the south.

Following the 2006 democracy movement in Nepal and the overthrow of the monarchy, an Interim Constitution was promulgated in 2007. Years of debate in two consecutive Constituent Assemblies centred on whether to base federalism upon ethnicity or a common identity, as well as over the number and locations of provinces. An opposition front led by the UCPN called for a federal system based on 13 ethnically defined provinces. The ruling Nepali Congress and CPN-UML parties rejected the idea, arguing that ethnicity-based federalism would create tension among ethnic castes and communities. Resistance also came from the upper-caste Brahmin and Chhetris, who feared that their long-standing political dominance would be threatened by ethnic federalism.

The three parties later agreed on nine founding principles for establishing provinces; five of these were identity-oriented, referring to ethnic and cultural ties. This led to the adoption of the term "ethnic federalism" to describe the structure proposed for Nepal, although some of the principles in fact referred to the wider notion of identity rather than ethnicity. The drawing of borders was complicated by the demographic distribution in many regions; there are over 100 officially recognised ethnic groups in Nepal, and many of them are geographically dispersed and do not form a majority in any territory.

The present federal Constitution was finally adopted in September 2015. It established a federal structure to replace the existing unitary structure. The country was divided into seven federal provinces formed by grouping existing Districts. The promulgation of the new constitution was immediately followed by protests on the part of the Madhesi and indigenous population, mainly over the boundaries of the new provinces, fearing a diminution of their political representation.

=== Pakistan ===
Following the secession in 1971 of East Pakistan to become Bangladesh, the Pakistani government sought ways to accommodate the ethno-nationalist demands of the different groups within what had been West Pakistan. The 1973 Constitution imposed a federal structure giving autonomy to the four main provinces, each historically identified with an ethno-linguistic group: the Punjabis, Sindhis, Balochis, and Pakhtuns. The political identity of these groups was legally recognised in the Constitution, giving them a status distinct from that of other groups. The provisions for autonomy were, however, fully implemented only in the province of Sindh. Through the subsequent period of military regimes and conflicts in different parts of Pakistan, the federal system did not appear to confer stability comparable to that of India.

The Constitution was re-introduced, with amendments, in 2010. This time all four provinces received "formidable autonomy in terms of both legislative and financial powers". In general the changes were marked by increased "ethnicization", encapsulated in the renaming of North West Frontier Province to Khyber Pakhtunkhwa ("land of Pakhtuns"). The changes were seen as "an important step forward" in strengthening the provinces, but there seemed to be little willingness to go further towards a fully multi-ethnic structure catering for all groups. The system has been described as "highly counter-productive" in respect of reigniting violent ethnic conflict between Sindhis and Muhajirs in Sindh. It has also evoked demands for separate provinces on the part of Hazarewals and Saraikis.

Indeed, it has been asserted that "Pakistan is seldom acknowledged as an ethnic federation".

=== South Sudan ===
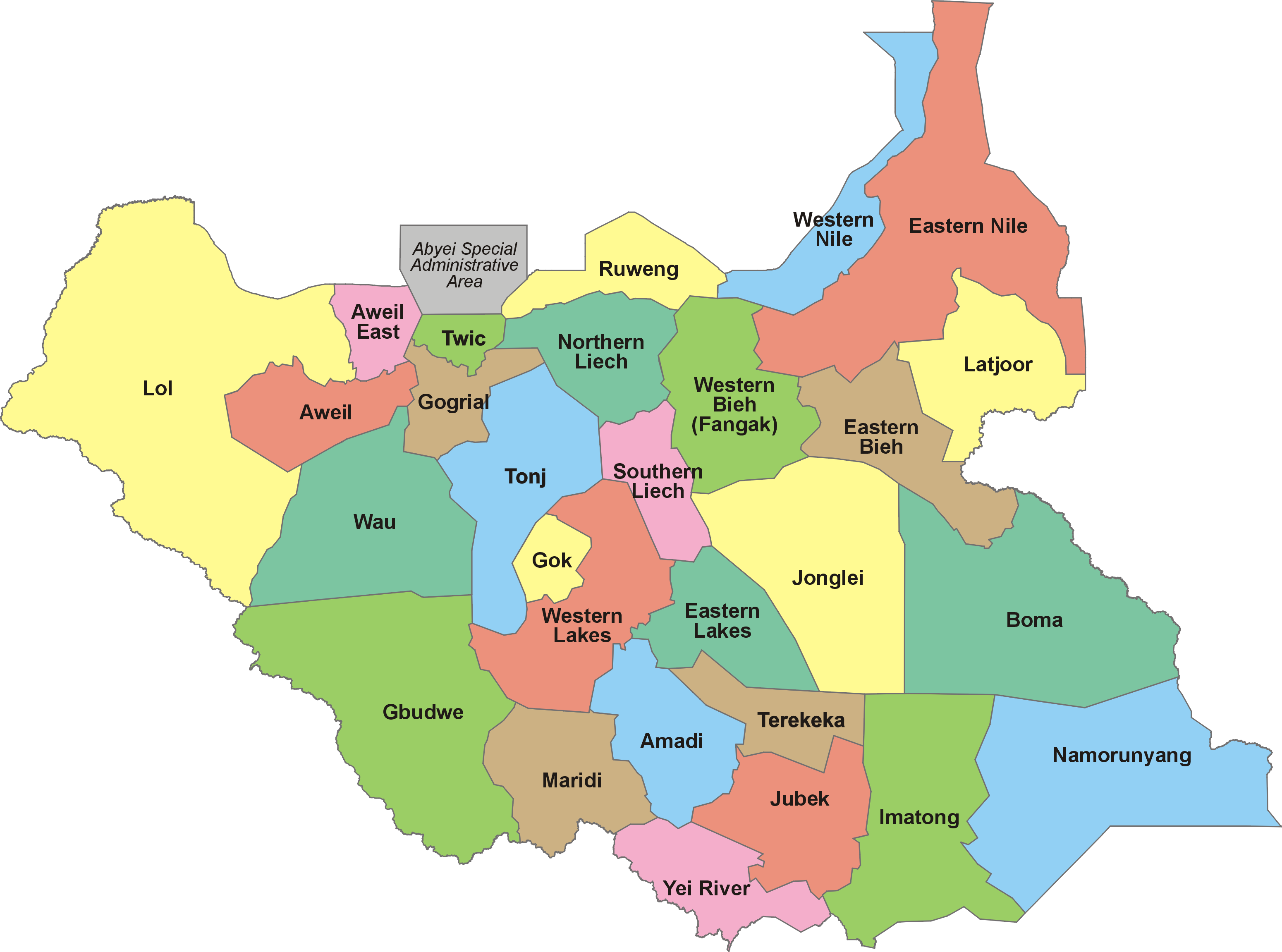
The 28 States of South Sudan from 2015 to 2020

South Sudan became independent of Sudan in July 2011, and initially the transitional constitution established 10 federal states and 79 counties, mostly based on ethnicity. Inter-communal conflict mounted, and there were calls from various groups for creation of further ethnocentric states and counties. Stephen Par Kuol, then minister of education in Jonglei state, opined in 2013 that "ethnic federalism" in his country had proved "divisive" and "expensive to run" and did not make for real democracy, and called for multi-ethnic states and counties to be created at least around the main cities.

In October 2015, South Sudan's president Salva Kiir issued a decree establishing 28 states, again largely along ethnic lines, to replace the former 10 states. The measure was approved in parliament in November, although in February 2020 the number of states in South Sudan returned to 10.

=== Yugoslavia ===

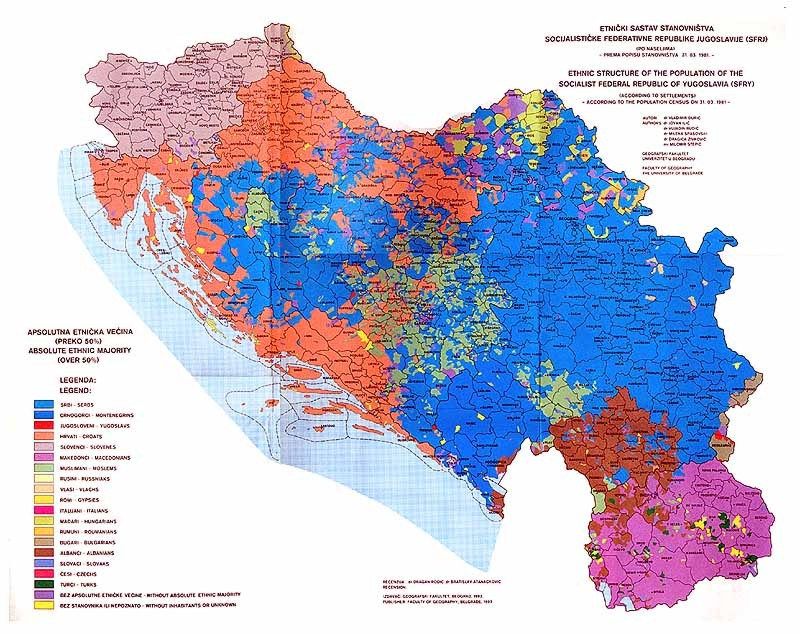
Ethnic groups in Yugoslavia, by majority in municipalities, according to the 1981 census (in Serbo-Croatian and English).

The 1946 constitution of the Socialist Federal Republic of Yugoslavia created a federation of six republics. To the three nationalities identified in the former name of the country - Kingdom of the Serbs, Croats and Slovenes - were added the Macedonians, Montenegrins and Bosnian Muslims (now Bosniaks). Alongside the recognition as nations of these republics, a strong central government was established under the control of the Communist Party.

From the 1970s a division developed within the Communist government, between Croatian and Slovenian supporters of greater autonomy for those republics, and Serbian advocates of a centralized federation to preserve the leading position of Serbs as the largest nationality within the country. Opposition to Communism was expressed in the form of a growing nationalism.

After the central authority waned in the 1980s, the leaderships of the republics increasingly pursued the interests of their own territories and inter-ethnic tensions mounted. Between 1991 and 2006 the six constituent republics all became independent nations; the earlier years of this process were marked by a series of wars. The lesson drawn was:

"Ethnic federalism seems to be a good solution only if it is applied moderately, ... in an atmosphere of democratic political culture, mutual tolerance, and the sincere wish to live together in peace with other ethnic groups".

== See also ==
- Balkanization
- Brotherhood and unity
- Consociationalism
- Confessionalism (politics)
- Ethnopluralism
- Plurinationalism
- Racial segregation
- United States of Greater Austria
- Trialism in Austria-Hungary
- Communities, regions and language areas of Belgium
- Proposed Croat federal unit in Bosnia and Herzegovina
- Community of Serb Municipalities
