= Oromo Democratic Party =

Former political party in Ethiopia (1982–2019)

Oromo Democratic Party Paartii Demokraatawaa Oromoo
- Chairman: Abiy Ahmed
- Deputy Chairman: Lemma Megersa
- Head of Central Committee Office: Addisu Arega Kitessa
- Founded: March 1982
- Dissolved: 1 December 2019
- Succeeded by: Prosperity Party
- Headquarters: Addis Ababa, Ethiopia
- Youth wing: ODP Youth League
- Ideology: Oromo interests
- National affiliation: Ethiopian People's Revolutionary Democratic Front
- Colors: Red, black, white, green gold

Party flag

The Oromo Democratic Party (Oromo: Paartii Demokraatawaa Oromoo, ODP), formerly known as the Oromo People's Democratic Organization (OPDO), was a political party in Ethiopia, and part of the alliance with the Amhara National Democratic Movement, the South Ethiopian Peoples' Democratic Front and the Tigrayan Peoples' Liberation Front that formed the Ethiopian People's Revolutionary Democratic Front (EPRDF). In the August 2005 Regional assembly elections, the party won 387 out of 537 seats in the Oromia, and 14 out of 36 seats in the Harari Region.

In November 2019, Prime Minister and Ethiopian People's Revolutionary Democratic Front Chairman Abiy Ahmed began the unification of the constituent parties of the coalition into a new Prosperity Party.

== History ==
The Oromo Democratic Party, formerly known as the Oromo Peoples' Democratic Organization (OPDO), was created in 1990 after the relations of the existing Oromo Liberation Front with the TPLF soured while they were fighting against the Derg regime. In a recent book authored by Gebru Asrat, a veteran TPLF leader who took part in the creation of OPDO said that the TPLF had to resort to its ethnic Oromo speaking war captives from the Derg's military to recruit members for the organization as Oromos living abroad, including those refugees in the Sudan and the wider Oromo diaspora in North America and Europe rejected TPLF's call to join the organization to be formed anew. Citing the role of elites in articulating political, economic and cultural problems in any society, Mr. Gebru argued in his book that these early members whom were former war captives had neither the capability nor sociopolitical know-how to understand and articulate Oromo problems at the time. At first a weak organization, according to Paul B. Henze, the OPDO attracted defectors from Derg military units and gained supporters when in 1991 the EPRDF occupied parts of the provinces of Wollo and Shewa, both of which had significant Oromo majorities.

In 2001, the OPDO was rocked by a series of corruption scandals, which led to the ouster of then secretary general Kuma Demeksa on charges of corruption, "anti-democratic practices", abuse of power and nepotism. Major-General Abadula Gemeda at the time resigned from his position in the Ethiopian National Defense Force and took control of the untroubled OPDO.

The OPDO is known to be dominated by Christian Oromos. The Muslim Oromos expressed their discontent during the 2005 Ethiopian general election, denouncing the other side for participating in nepotism. The OPDO held their fourth congress on 23 February 2006 in Adama.

In the 2008 by-elections, the OPDO won 23 seats in the Oromia Regional legislature, and 613 seats from 108 Araddaas for elections to the Ward Peoples' Representatives Council. The OPDO changed its name to the Oromo Democratic Party (ODP) on its annual meeting held on 20 September 2018 in Jimma.

== See also ==
- Prosperity Party
- EPRDF
