= Southern Ethiopian People's Democratic Movement =

Southern Ethiopian People's Democratic Movement ደቡብ ኢትዮጵያ ህዝቦች ዴሞክራሲያዊ ንቅናቄ
- Abbreviation: SEPDM ደኢህዴን
- Chairperson: Muferiat Kamil
- Founded: 1992
- Dissolved: 1 December 2019
- Merged into: Prosperity Party
- Headquarters: Hawassa
- Ideology: Social democracy Democratic socialism Federalism; Self-determination
- National affiliation: EPRDF
- Colors

Website
- www.sepdm.org.et

The Southern Ethiopian People's Democratic Movement (SEPDM; Amharic: ደቡብ ኢትዮጵያ ህዝቦች ዴሞክራሲያዊ ንቅናቄ) was a political party in Ethiopia.

Originally known as the Southern Ethiopia Peoples Democratic Front, the SEPDM was founded in 1992. Muferiat Kamil was the final chairperson of the SEPDM, replacing the previous chairman Shiferaw Shigute on 25 June 2018.

At the legislative elections on 15 May 2005, the party was part of the Ethiopian People's Revolutionary Democratic Front, that won 327 out of 527 seats in the Council of People's Representatives. In the August 2005 Regional assembly elections, the party won 271 out of 348 seats in the Southern Nations, Nationalities, and People's Region (SNNPR). The SEPDM announced 13 December 2007 that in the next election cycle that they would field 790,000 candidates for races for offices in woreda and kebele councils, town administration and the House of Peoples' Representatives. In the 2008 by-elections, the SEPDM won 10 seats in the SNNPR regional assembly, all 850 seats up for election in the 13 Zones of the SNNPR, control of 123 woredas and 20 towns.

In November 2019, Prime Minister Abiy Ahmed and Ethiopian People's Revolutionary Democratic Front Chairman unified the constituent parties of the coalition into a new Prosperity Party.
