= Amhara Democratic Party =

Former political party in Ethiopia (1982–2019)

Amhara Democratic Party አማራ ዴሞክራሲያዊ ፓርቲ
- Abbreviation: ADP አዴፓ
- Chairman: Demeke Mekonnen
- Deputy Chairman: Ambachew Mekonnen
- Head Officer: Yohannes Buayalew
- Founded: November 16-20, 1980
- Dissolved: 1 December 2019
- Split from: Ethiopian People's Revolutionary Party
- Merged into: Prosperity Party
- Headquarters: Bahir Dar, Ethiopia
- Ideology: Amhara nationalism
- National affiliation: Ethiopian People's Revolutionary Democratic Front

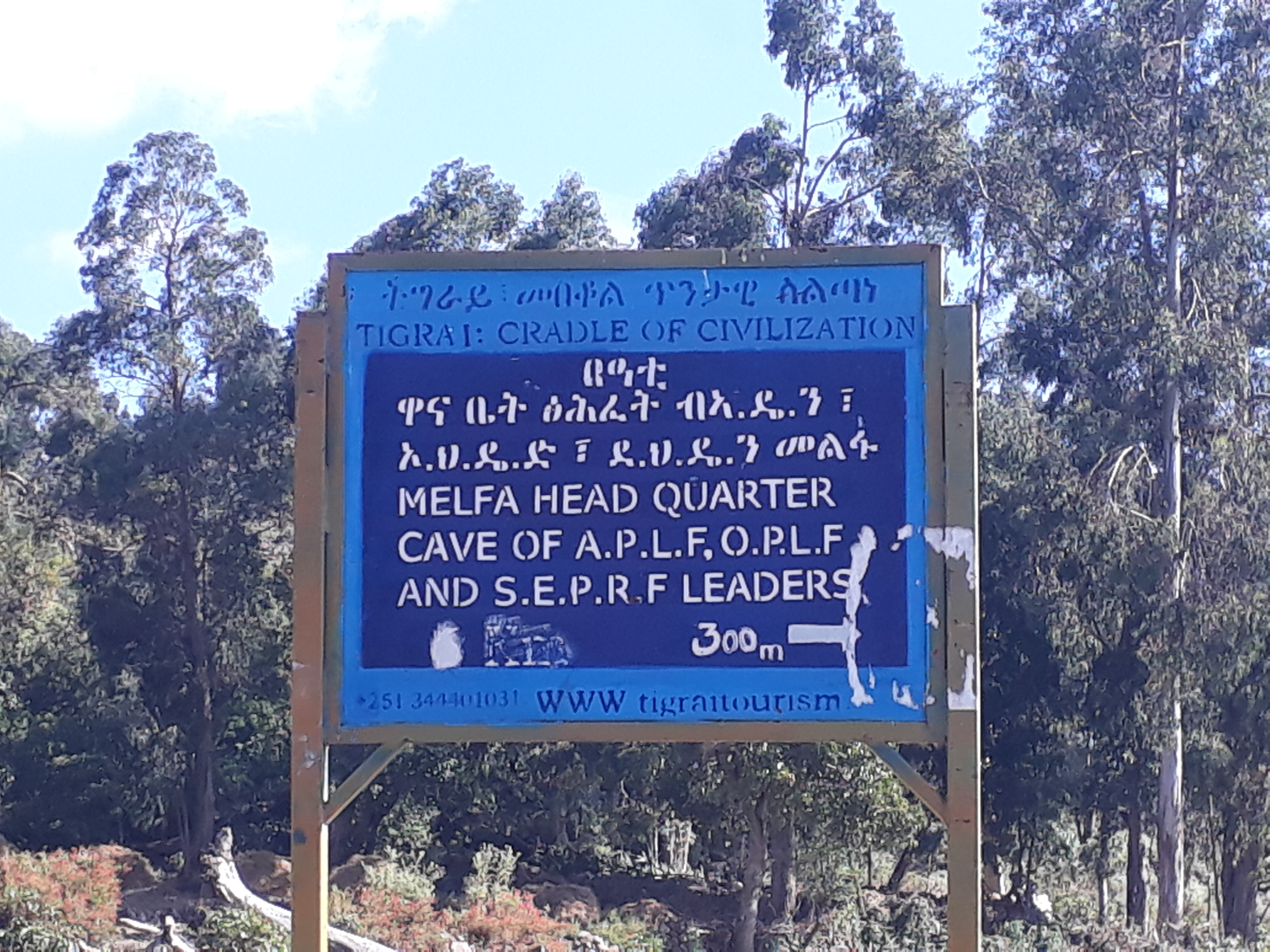
Signboard for EPDM/APLF/ANDM/ADP headquarters in Melfa during the Ethiopian Civil War

The Amhara Democratic Party (ADP) (Amharic: አማራ ዴሞክራሲያዊ ፓርቲ, romanized: āmara dēmokirasīyawī paritī), formerly known as the Amhara National Democratic Movement (ANDM), was a political party in Ethiopia. The party was one of four members of the Ethiopian People's Revolutionary Democratic Front (EPRDF) that ruled Ethiopia at the time. In 2012, the party chairman was Demeke Mekonnen, who replaced Addisu Legesse in 2010. In November 2019, prime minister Abiy Ahmed, holding the role of EPRDF chair, unified the constituent parties of the coalition into a new party called Prosperity Party.

== History ==
The Ethiopian People's Democratic Movement (EPDM), the precursor of ANDM, was founded by former members of the Ethiopian People's Revolutionary Party (EPRP) and supported by the Tigrayan People's Liberation Front (TPLF).

A series of debates within the EPRP on the characteristic of revolution and on the organisation had started in as late as 1977. Following the EPRP's defeat by the TPLF in March-April 1978, these debates became even more acute, which resulted with the EPRP gunning down some questioning members of itself at Syngede in April 1978. Opposition to the CC was handled in all parts but the Eastern Gonder Regional Party and Army structures (Belessa region). In the Belessa region, amongst the ranks of the party, clandestine cores formed, which was called Belessa Democratic Movement. Among the criticism made to party centre there were questions related with the organisation, strategy, and tactics. Belessa Democratic Movement held a congress on May 29, 1980, elected a core of five members who would carry out the decisions, and decided to formally secede from the EPRP and its armed wing EPRA, which was declared on June 9, 1980. Seceding group retreated to the Tigray area, and (after a five months of internal struggle) its 37 members held a congress on November 16-20, 1980 to form the Ethiopian People's Democratic Movement (EPDM). EPDM's aim was ending the imperialist dominance over the Ethiopia and the "imperialism dependent state capitalism" of the Derg regime, finishing the anti-feudal revolution, recognizing the self-determination of nations (particularly Eritrean and Tigray ones, in which their organizations, the EPLF and the TPLF, were recognized as strategic allies), and founding a self-sufficient, independent and non-aligned country. From the very beginning, EPDM worked under the TPLF tutelage, carrying out (especially after 1982) joint military operations with it, especially in northern Gondar and Waghimra in Wollo where it was based.

EPDM convened its First Organizational Congress in Jerba Yohannes, Waghimra, in November 1983. During the Ethiopian Civil War, its military headquarters were located in a cave in Melfa (Dogu'a Tembien). In 1988, EPDM and its long-time ally TPLF united to form the Ethiopian People's Revolutionary Democratic Front (EPDRF).

On May 27-June 1, 1989, Marxist-Leninist core within the EPDM held its congress, founding the Ethiopian Marxist-Leninist Force (EMLF). Like the MLLT in TPLF, the EMLF was planned as a leading force of the "people's democratic movement" (that's the EPDM) and a subject of future all-Ethiopia Marxist-Leninist party. After the EMLF, the EPDM also held its Second Organizational Congress on June 17-21, 1989.

At its Third Organizational Conference on 25 January 1994, the EPDM changed its name to Amhara National Democratic Movement (ANDM), under the influence of the directions given by the TPLF who regarded the EPDM as its satellite, marking its transition from a pan-Ethiopian movement to an ethnic nationalist party. In the May 2010 Regional State Council elections, the ANDM won all 294 seats in the Amhara Region.

On its annual conference on 30 September 2018, Amhara National Democratic Movement changed its title to Amhara Democratic Party. Amhara Democratic Party dissolved itself into the Prosperity Party in 2019.

== See also ==
- Category:Amhara Democratic Party politicians
