= National Intelligence and Security Service (Ethiopia) =

Intelligence agency of the Ethiopian federal government

National Intelligence and Security Service የብሔራዊ መረጃና ደኅንነት አገልግሎት

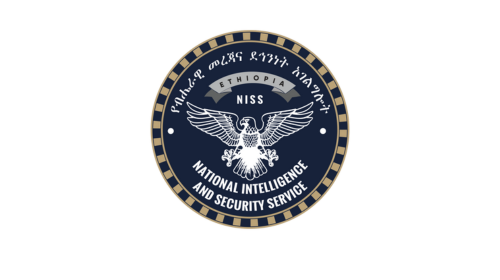
- Motto: We shall excel in intelligence and serve loyally

Agency overview
- Formed: 1941; 85 years ago
- Employees: Classified
- Annual budget: Classified

Jurisdictional structure
- Federal agency: Ethiopia
- Operations jurisdiction: Ethiopia
- Constituting instrument: Proclamation 804/2013 Act of Parliament
- General nature: Federal law enforcement

Operational structure
- Headquarters: Arat Kilo, Addis Ababa, Ethiopia
- 9°01′06″N 38°45′44″E
- Agency executive: Redwan Hussein, Director General
- Parent agency: Office of the Prime Minister; Ministry of Peace
- Divisions: Head Office; Central Investigations; Internal Security; Foreign Research and Studies; Technical Department; Counter-Terrorism Division; Federal Training Center; Immigration & Nationalities; Economic Security; Refugees Office

Website
- niss.gov.et

The National Intelligence and Security Service (Amharic: የብሔራዊ መረጃና ደህንነት አገልግሎት, NISS) is the principle intelligence and security agency of the Ethiopian government tasked to defend, protect and advance the national security and interests of Ethiopia. It collects, analyzes and disseminates intelligence for decision makers. It also is one of two national law enforcement agencies in Ethiopia next to the Federal Police Commission, due to its role, the NISS itself is a highly specialized national police force. It tackles drug trafficking, cybercrime, arms trafficking, human, and other domestic or international organized crime.

NISS organizes and leads the Joint Security and Intelligence Task Force established to maintain peace and security across the country. It also is the leading agency tasked with counterterrorism, counterintelligence in addition with collaborations with the different counterpart intelligence agencies and also with the Ethiopian Federal Police, Ethiopian National Defense Force, and other regional security bodies. It was re-established in 2013 GC and renamed the National Intelligence and Security Service (NISS) although it already has a long extensive prior history in different format and shapes over the course of over 80 years under the Imperial government during Emperor Haile Selassie I and onward through 3 different governmental constitutions and changes.

== Organization ==
The organization is the main police agency tasked with law enforcement regarding aviation, border security and checkpoints in airports and land designated areas. They are the main intelligence agency in the country including the federal police bar none. They mainly gather their broad network of information from their HUMINT or human intelligence infrastructure. Whilst the Information Network Security Agency or INSA gathers signals intelligence domestically and overseas. The NISS also gathers FININT or financial intelligence as required by law.

They can also purchase distribute and make and also license permits to weapons and explosives traveling in and abroad the country as per law. Formerly local police departments issued licenses to weapons, similar to the United Kingdom, until recently when the NISS was the primary organization tasked with issuing and revoking licenses. They are also tasked with counterterrorism inside and outside the country and protect the current constitution from being attacked. Under statutory law, have the ability to enforce both the Immigration and Nationalities acts in the place of the foreign ministry when deemed necessary. The Security, Immigration and Refugee Affairs Authority was replead to give NISS full authority of immigration, refugees and security regarding international commerce and foreign dealings. They have the ability to enforce court warrants granted by a court and detain individuals although they usually cooperate with local regional police forces and the Federal Police, at times of need they can issue arrests without any cooperation as they themselves are warranted by the state as police officers. (Note: As noted in "Law operations" they have imposed travel bans and have lifted them in full effect can under Proclamation 809/2013, although unlisted in previous Nationalities and Immigration laws can enforce them under the 2013 proclamation. The NISS is a police force, although highly secretive in plain clothing at times they have the legal authority to carry arrests which is the defining factor of them being a police force, a warranted body by the state)

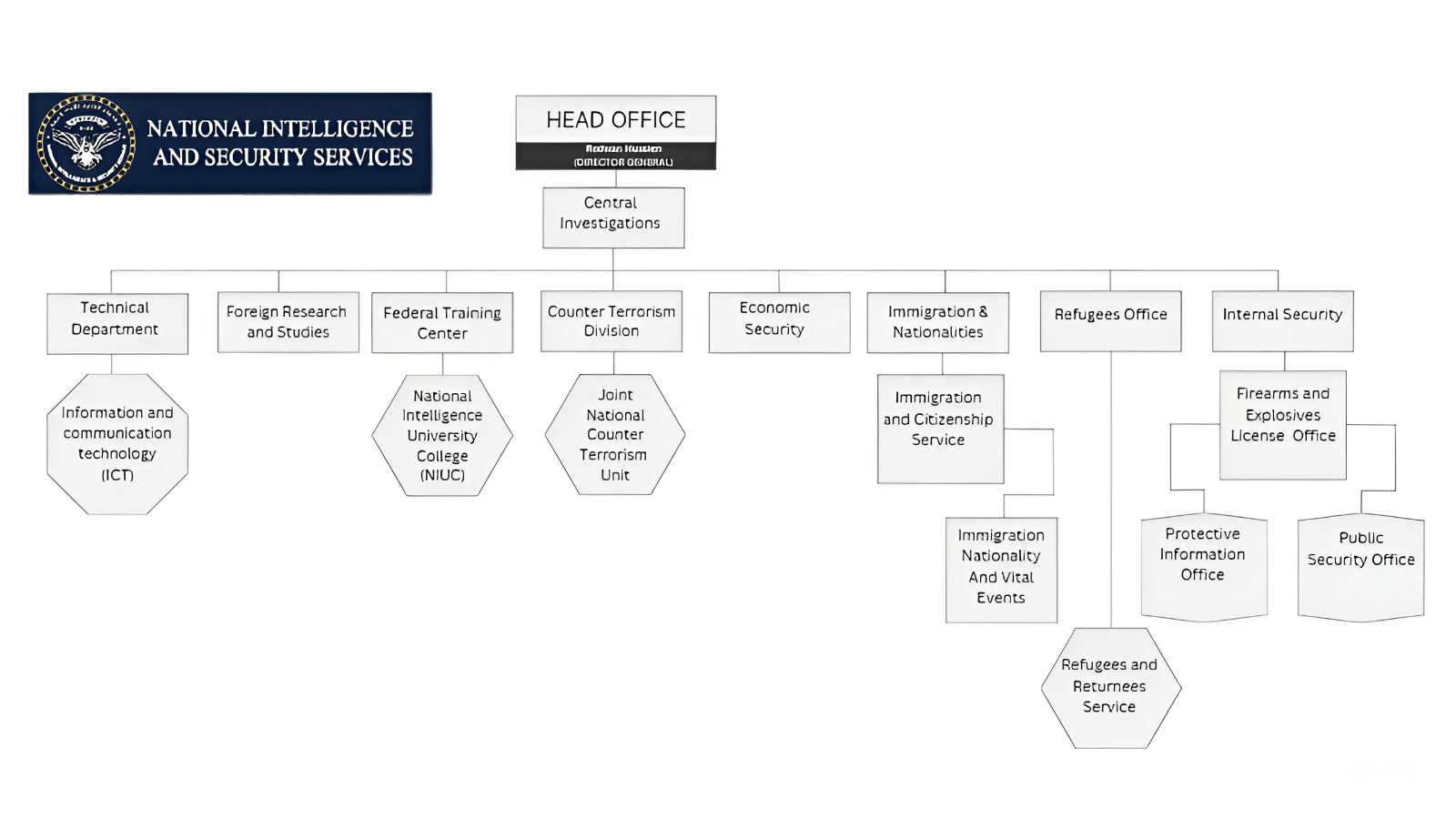
Structure of the NISS (2024) all known divisions and subdivisions listed

=== Structure ===
The NISS has departments and agencies within.

- Head Office (Responsible for controlling all activities and reports to the Ministry of Peace)
- Central Investigations (Investigates any and all crimes within and outside the organization)
- Internal Security (Matters within Ethiopia and counterespionage inside the country and analysis)
- Foreign Research and Studies (Foreign Espionage outside of Ethiopia and missions like of)
- Technical Department (Assigns and solves any and all technical issues within the agency and such)
- Counter-Terrorism Division (Leads the Joint Taskforce with the EFP and MOJ to combat terrorism with other cooperative agencies)
- Federal Training Center (Leads the training center commissioning all federal officers of Ethiopia)
- Economic Security (Analysis on Ethiopian based companies within the workforce unbeknown)
- Immigration & Nationalities (Controls Immigration of goods and peoples, and citizenship process)
- Refugees Office (Controls and administrates locations for refugees in Ethiopia and administration)

== Legal authority ==
=== Statutory powers ===
The NISS's mandate is laid out in Proclamation No. 804/2013 Article 8 which grants the powers of investigating financial crimes against the state. Furthermore, in Article 24 its lays out the mechanism of the NISS needing a court order to seize and search the persons of groups they are investigating.

In addition, the Computer Crime Proclamation (Proclamation No. 958/2016) allows through a court issued warrant for the NISS to collect real time data on the persons or groups being investigated for potentially breaking the law. The Proclamation on Telecom Fraud Offence (Proclamation No. 761/2012) also allows local police with the NISS to jointly cooperate in a court warrant. The Proclamation on the Prevention and Suppression of Terrorism Crimes also allows the NISS with the MOJ to prosecute individuals contacting groups labeled as terror groups by a proclamation of parliament which is its primary mechanism which it uses to arrest individuals with suspected ties of these illicit organizations. As one of the two nationally mandated federal police forces which includes the Federal police, the NISS has all the powers vested upon peace officers. Members of the NISS can be considered police officers, although their function is highly specialized.

Under official operations, as federal officers of the state, they are immune from checkpoints of town, city, regional states in addition to federal premises and as such they can carry weapons issued to them by the organization. Curfew restrictions do not apply to them due to their status as federal police officers with an intelligence component.

=== Law operations ===
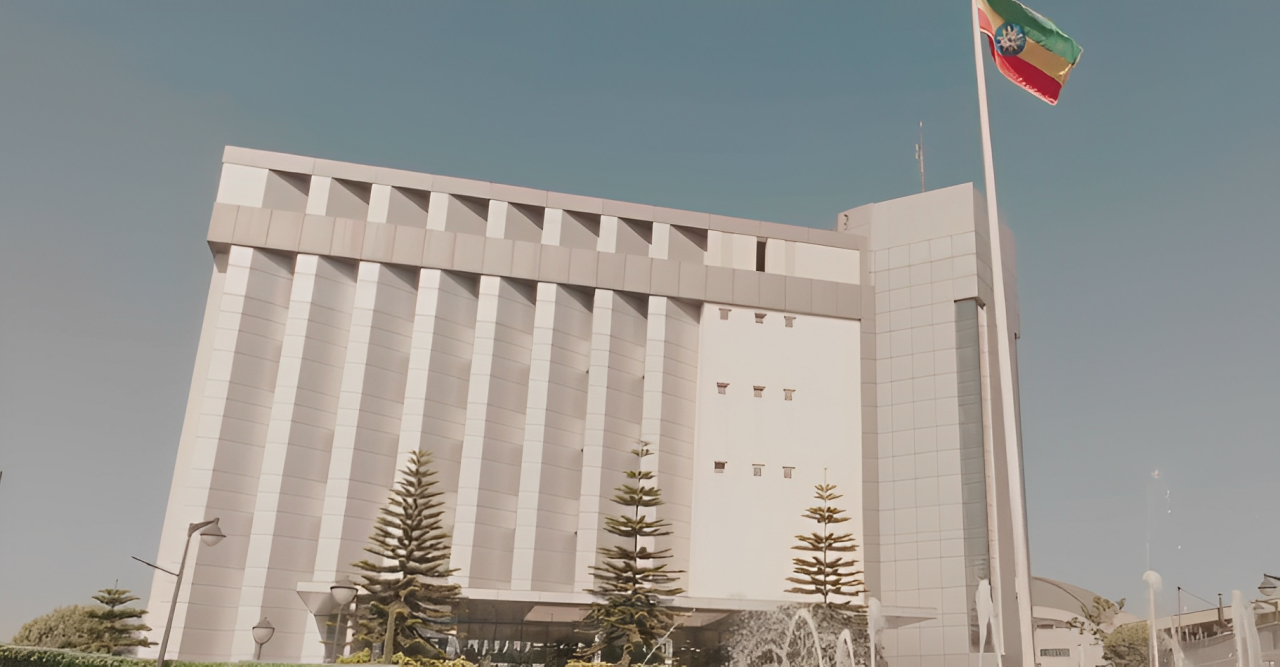
NISS headquarter

The National Intelligence and Security Service in 2019 showed legal authority and imposed a travel ban on 3,000 individuals from moving out into other countries. This was disclosed after MP's had visited the headquarters of the institution.

=== Cooperation ===
Ethiopian NISS and Somalia Intelligence forces worked together to counter act Al-Shabaab and ISIS terrorist through various MOU's signed. The NISS has also various other agreements through Afripol including, Sudan, Kenya and other African nations regarding cross border crimes through varying degrees.

Cooperation with foreign law enforcement and spy agencies has extended to countries like the U.S., Russia, and Israel. In August 2019, the NISS and the U.S. Federal Bureau of Investigation (FBI), signed a memorandum of understanding to jointly combat terrorism. In November 2020, the NISS and Israeli intelligence agency Mossad, had agreed to fight in counter-terrorism operations jointly. And on 9 June 2021, the Russian government and NISS had agreed to strengthen cooperation in joint counterterrorism. The South Korean National Intelligence Service also has a join combat program between the NISS. They also have cooperation arrangements with the Ugandan External Security Organization or (ESO) of dealing with illegal immigration and human trafficking and contrabands.

== History ==
=== Haile Selassie I era ===
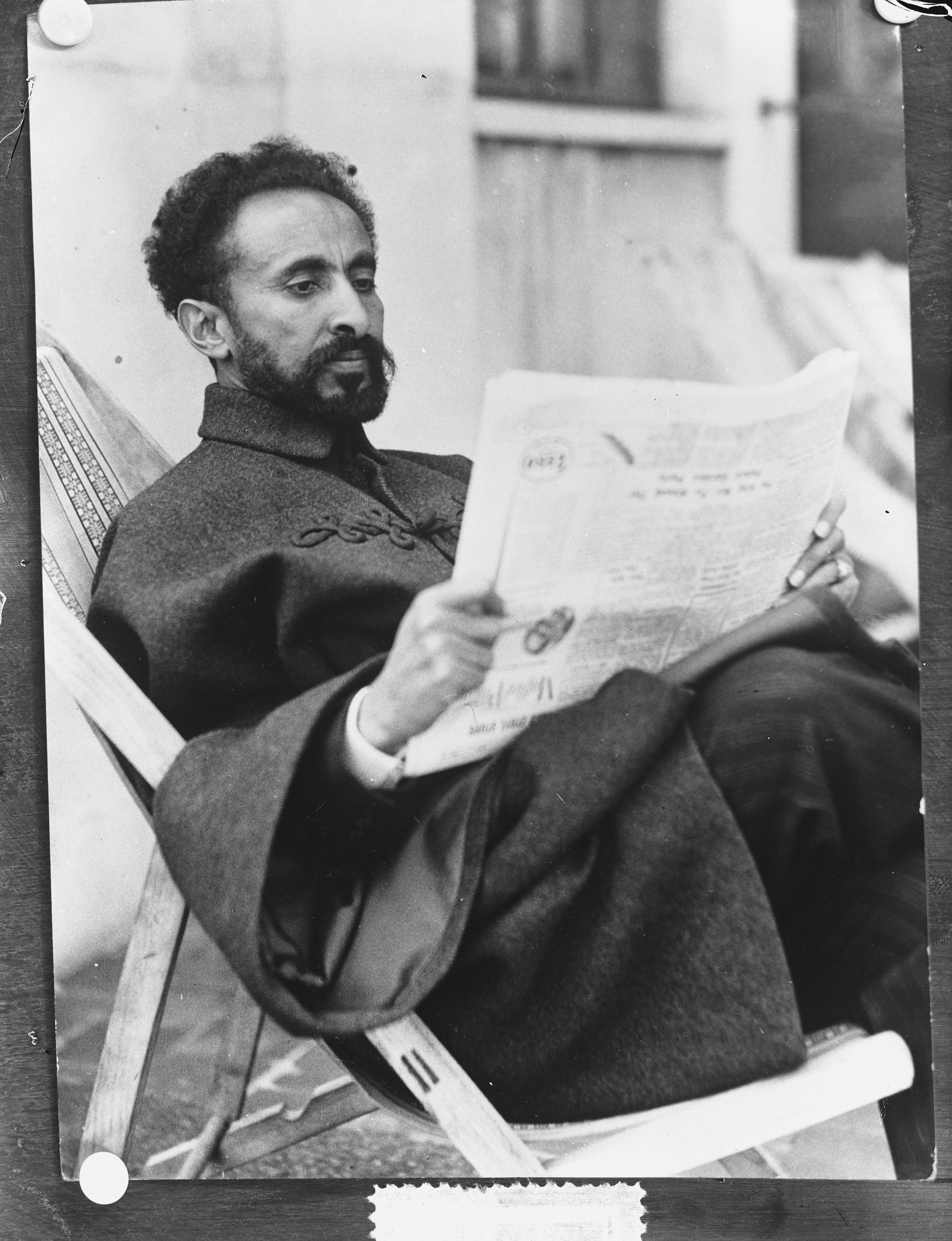
Emperor Haile Selassie I, forms the first modern intelligence agency in the country in 1941

Ethiopia's intelligence agency and its traces back in 1935 where during the reign of Emperor Haile Selassie I, fascist Italy led by dictator Benito Mussolini invaded the country. This forced the first formation of an older version of the NISS. It was then led by military Lieutenant Workneh Gebeyehu. The agency wasn't created to help Ethiopia in war efforts against Axis forces during the 1936-1941 war between the two nations. Neither Insisting the Ethiopian Imperial armed forces and their respective British allies in cooperation of the war effort by the Emperor, since the agency was immediately created after the liberation of Ethiopia after the invasion in 1941. After the war ended and years had passed, the Emperor's government led by Prime Minister Makonnen Endelkachew in 1955 was incorporated into the National Security oversight in a 'special cabinet' under provision of Solomon Kedir head of the special cabinet. In 1960 it was clear that the intelligence agency wasn't able to disseminate a coup led by General Mengistu Neway and Dejazemach Germame Neway. Nonetheless, the armed forces of Ethiopia were able to stop the attempted coup d'état. The intelligence agency was broken up in 4 other divisions of the Ethiopian intelligence community during the time of Haile Selassie I. The other divisions of the community of intelligence spied on each other also including civilians.

=== Derg era ===
During the Derg regime, starting in 1974 after the successful toppling of Emperor Haile Selassie I in a coup d'état. A fundamental change of the agency was made. The agency was named 'Committee for peoples Security and Peace' this was provided in the Derg's proclamation 10/1966. During the early 80s the Derg establishes the agency(s) as 'Ministry of Security Protection for the Country and the People' for the purpose of intelligence gathering. And in the late 80s the Derg finally establish it as 'Ministry of Internal Affair' and given its nature it has no capabilities of law enforcement domestically in the nation. Due to economic and war turmoil between modern day Eritrea, and Somalia, the agency had to work not only on citizens or civilians but help in the front against hostile foreign agents in cooperation with the defence forces.

=== TPLF era ===
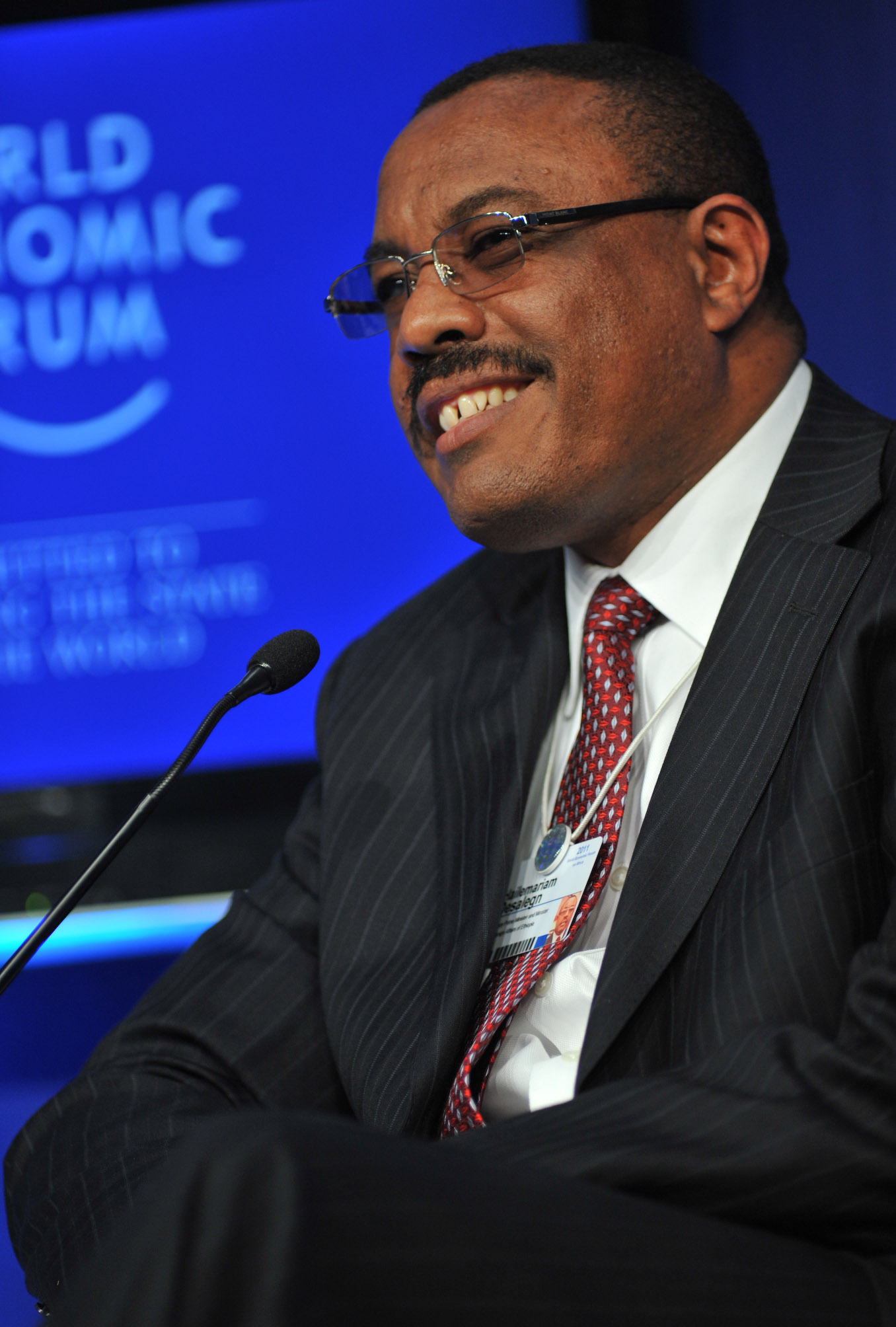
Hailemariam Desalegn was the Prime Minister at the time of its modern creation in 2013

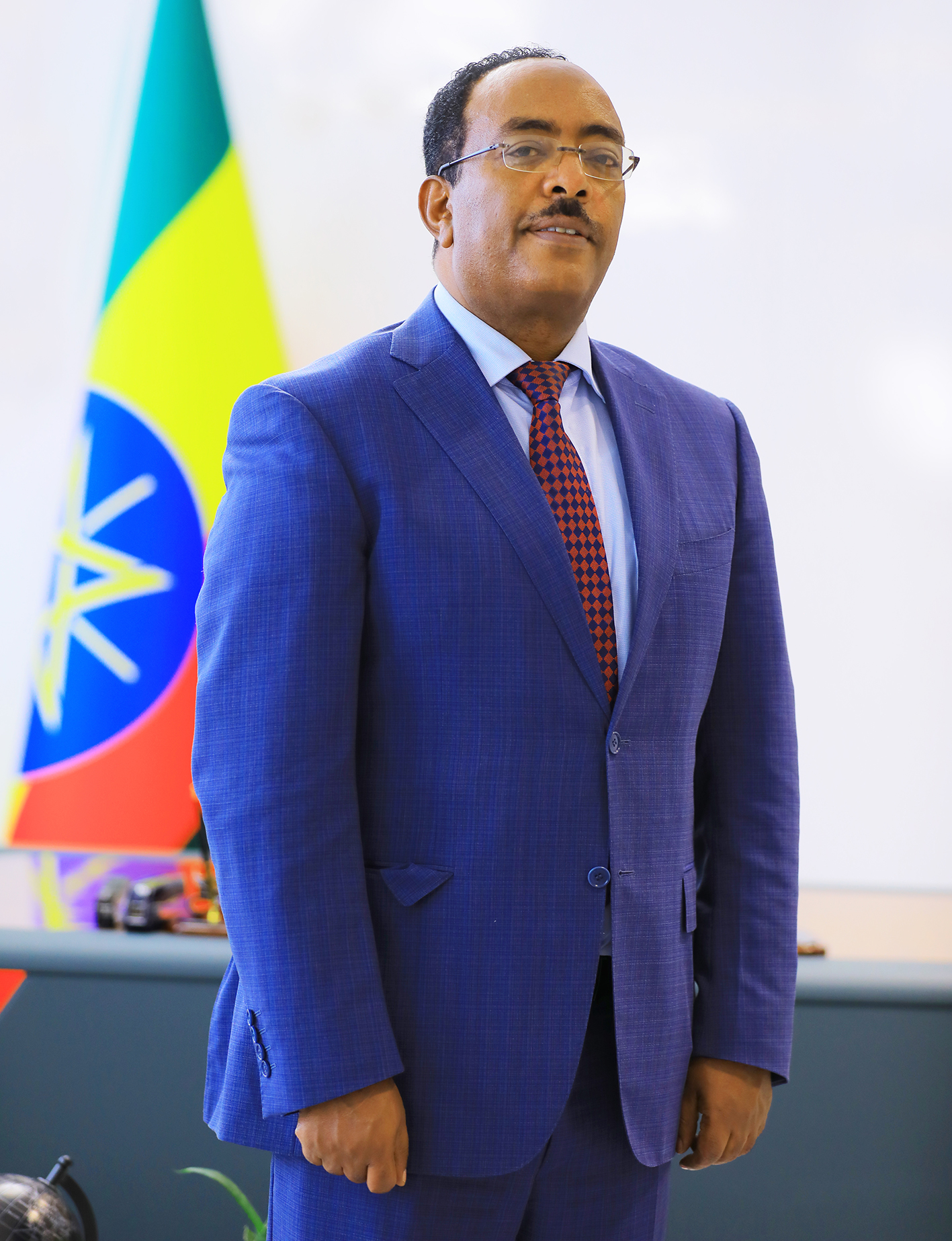
Redwan Hussien, Director General, National Intelligence and Security Service

In 1991 during the fall of the Derg military Junta, military insurgents from northern Ethiopia led by the TPLF form a new constitution in which the formation and the creation of an intelligence agency is in face. Nonetheless, the former workforce of the previous intelligence officers created by the Derg was disbarred and made 'dysfunctional' to which a brand-new organization related to Intelligence was formed. During the mid 90s the TPLF led government appoints Kuma Demeksa to lead the department overseeing the intelligence under Ministry of Internal Affair. Kinfe Gebremedhin was the director of the agency itself. Later on, in the 90s on wared to the early 2000s the government of Ethiopia under the TPLF renames the organization as 'Authority for Security, Immigration and Refugees Affair' to which giving a broader power and even a law enforcement aspect to the organization. Giving authority to oversee immigration from borders, airport terminals and such, and refugees under parliament proclamation 6/1987. And during the early 2000s the intelligence agency switches directors with Getachew Assefa replacing Kinfe Gebremedhin. Getachew Assefa leads the agency for 17 years from the early 2001 to 2018. The NISS and the Ethiopian Federal Police's Joint Anti-Terror Task Force both apprehended 35 suspects, later turned increased to 46 suspects, many of whom were high ranking Ethiopian military officials for staging a possible revolution through a Coup d'état. Nonetheless 8 of the 46 suspects were released due to the lack of incriminating evidence found, 14 found in absentia. Only 5 were acquitted in the trials of the Ginbot 7 individuals. The NISS with the EFP has had to deal with heightened tensions and possible terror attacks against international organizations located in Addis Ababa and warning the public through media communication to give details of any possible attacks during the 2008-2009 period. (Note: Report on multiple Ethiopia military officials arrested for staging a possible revolution.) In addition, the NISS has detained and illegally arrested 14 Americans in their Immigration and Nationalities division headquarters in Addis Ababa, where they questioned them. Later on, they were put in trial and released under prime minister Meles Zenawi's direction. (Note: Report on 14 Arrested and deported Americans in Ethiopia due to 'overqualification' and other contrary reasons given by the NISS)

=== Current era ===
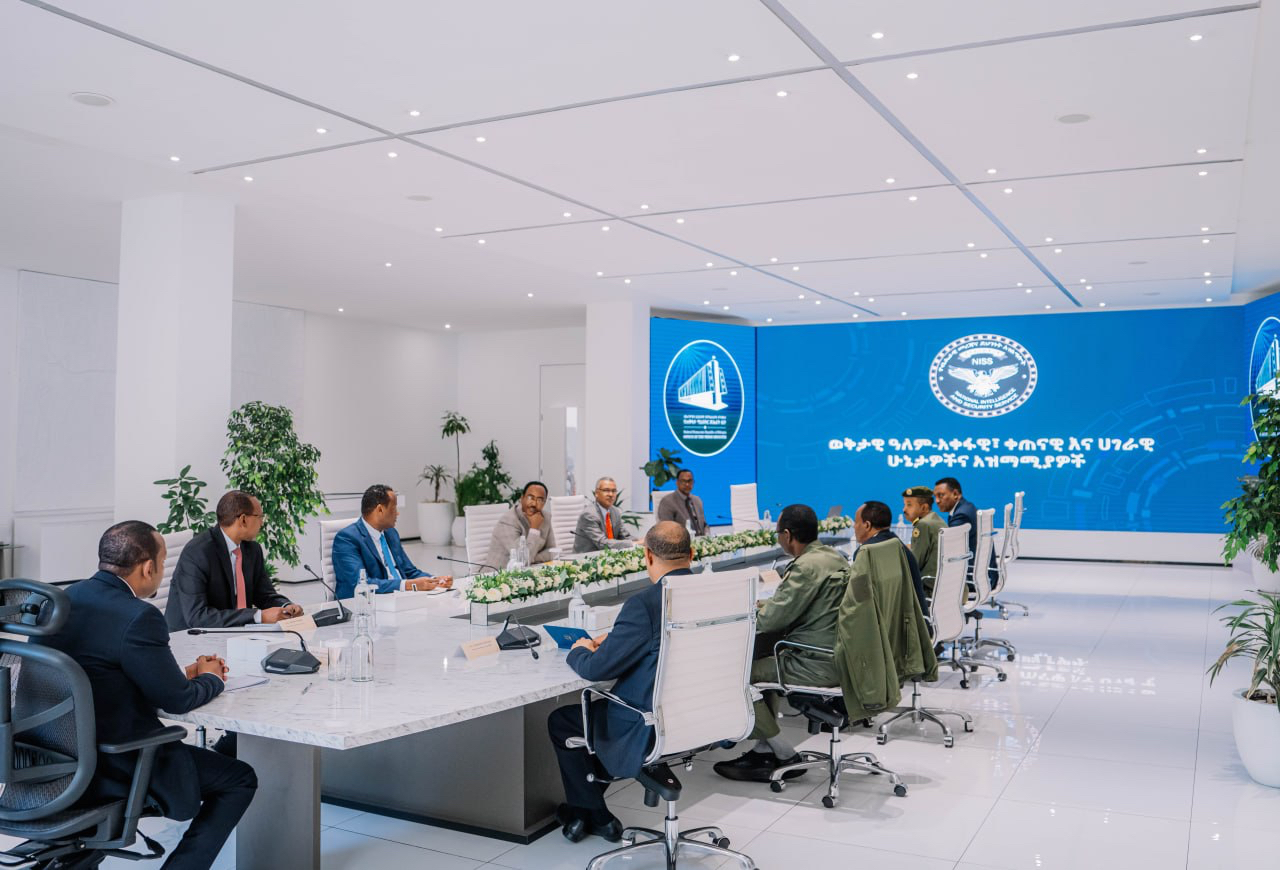
Prime Minister Abiy Ahmed briefing with the National Intelligence and Security Service Director General Redwan Hussien

The NISS over its three decades of its modern existence has made politically motivated arrests, and torture, to journalists who oppose the government's points of views, and individuals. The NISS in its rebranding allowed for parliamentary oversight in its conductions of duties and day to day works. News media agencies were allowed also to report on the parliamentary oversight NISS even if most media were government owned and state affiliated one private media was allowed also the Reporter. In an effort to rebrand the institution, NISS will have a new name— the National Intelligence Center (NIC) — as well as a new logo, Demelash (former director of NISS) said. Going into the merits of the restructuring, Demelash talked about a draft law, currently under scrutiny in the Council of Ministers, which is expected to refer it to the House People's Representatives where it will be ratified. According to Demelash, the new law will clearly demarcate the powers and functions of the intelligence service and ensure that the activities are subject to institutional oversight and appropriate safeguards.

The parliament proposed bill will force and prevent officials working at the agency of having any discriminatory practices against groups for their political affiliations while on the course of their duties. But Ethiopia's democratic index is one of the lowest in the world, and the agency has had criticism regarding its silence on political corruption of government officials.

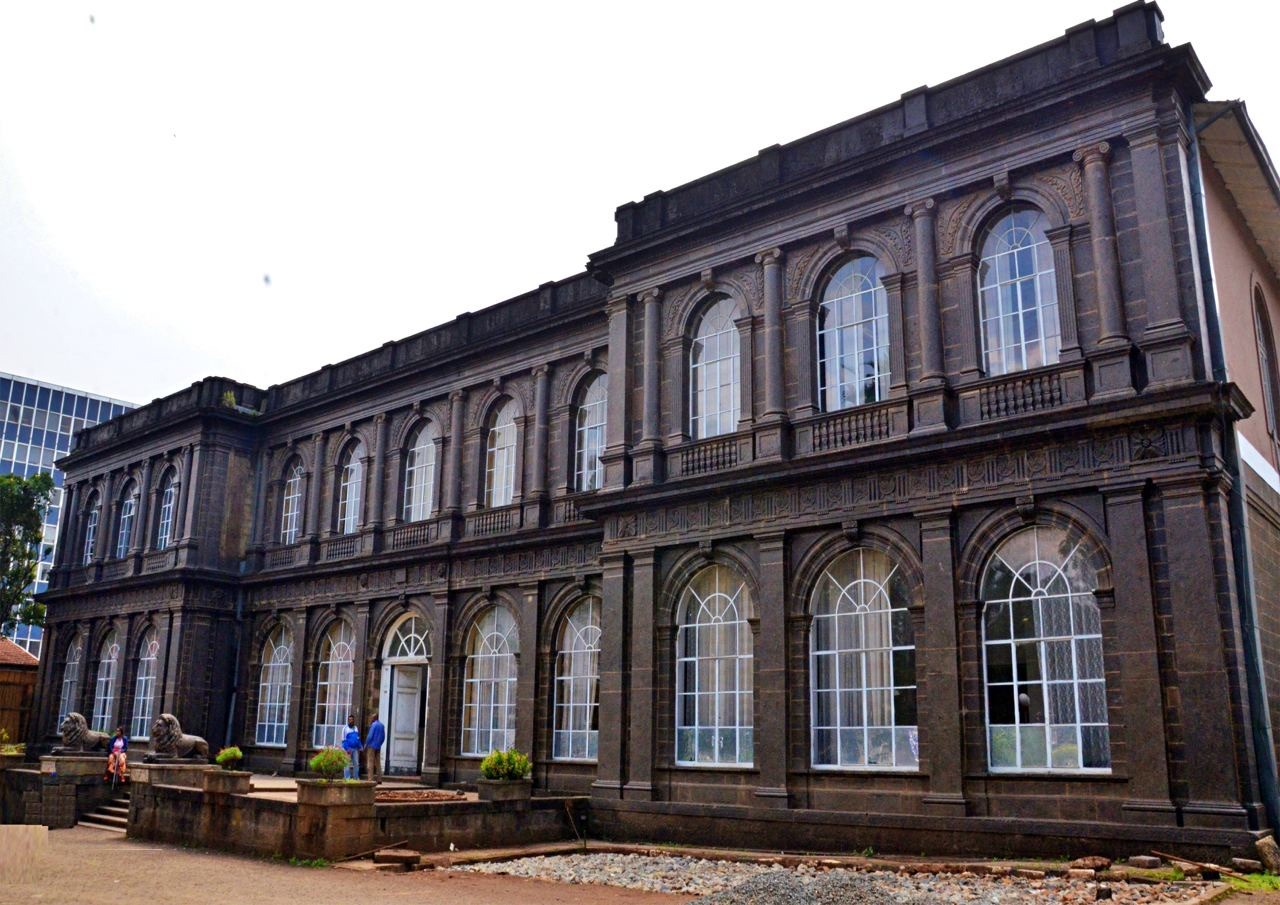
The Federal High Court of Ethiopia sentenced former NISS officials in 2022 and 2023 respectively (Supreme Court pictured)

Former officials of the NISS had been charged with gross human rights abuses, dereliction of duty through ill act on finically supported deadly weapons as explosives being used for non-duty related activity. Getachew Assefa the former head of the organization has been found guilty and is a convicted felon in absentia for corruption including mass murder and sentenced to 18 years in prison. Other high members as Yared Zerihun, the chief of the anti-terrorism taskforce division of the NISS, and Emanuel Kiros, a former senior official at the agency have been arrested and found guilty and sentenced to 3 to 5 years in prison for human rights abuses deducted from corruption and dereliction of duty in the Federal High Court, Lideta division, the second highest court of Ethiopia. On December 4, 2021, during the height of the Tigray war, the NISS was unsuccessfully searching to arrest Tigrayan Ethiopian Airlines employees for 'terrorism' solely due to their ethnicity, during at the time of high levels of propagated hate towards Tigrayans and their affiliates. Others such as technicians and Ethiopian Airlines employees have escaped prior to this on December 1, of 2021, in the then prolonged conflict.

==== United States ====
Although Ethiopia has good relations with the United States of America, especially after cooperation with the US for over 80 years, problems have arisen between the nations. A former Abraham Teklu Lemma, an NISS agent working for its Foreign Research and Studies division in the United States was providing the ENDF and the National Intelligence Security Agency satellite imagery from National Reconnaissance Office, to which Abraham, a contractor at the US State Department, had classified access to, due to his status as an administrator at the State Department's Bureau of Intelligence and Research division, which is a part of the US Intelligence Community. The imagery assisted Ethiopia in combating the TPLF during the Tigray war. Abraham is currently charged with Espionage. The Federal Bureau of Investigation (FBI) including the Department of Justice (DOJ) and the State Department's Diplomatic Security Service (DSS) are currently investigating the matter.

==== UAE Embassy ====
In 2021 the NISS was able to gather intel that a terrorist plot was setting place in the capital, Addis Ababa targeted against the United Arab Emirates (UAE) Embassy by Iranian nationals. 16 Iranian nationals were arrested by the NISS for a suspected terror attack against the UAE Embassy and staff. The NISS also had said that such attacks were also being planned in Sudan. The Ethiopian government had said this was for a retaliation against the death for Iranian General Qassem Soleimani to which the Ethiopia had any known connection with. It is unknown what happened with the arrested suspects and their then 35-year-old leader Ahmed Ismail.

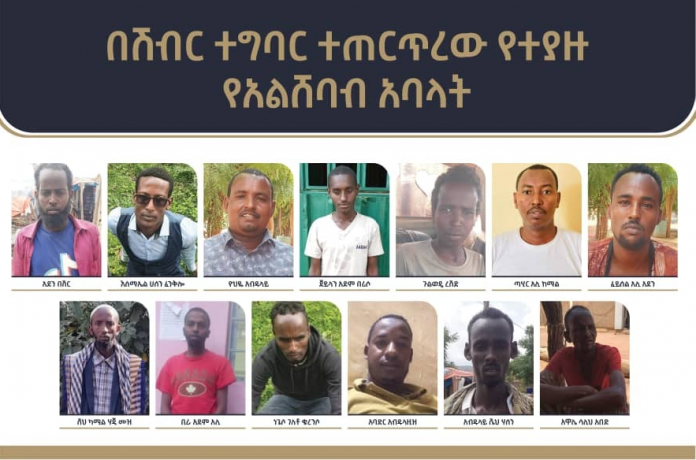
Al-Shabaab members arrested by the NISS across the nation

==== Al-Shabaab ====
The internationally and domestically listed terrorist organization Al-Shabaab has had some of its suspected 34 members arrested by the NISS. The members were said to plan a methodically coordinated attack in Addis Ababa, and the rest of the country in a terror plan. Many of the arrests were made in rural areas of the country. The NISS made a statement saying possible threats may arise following the 2022 arrests of the members. Al-Shabaab has stayed silent on the matter regarding the 34 number arrests made against its members across various regional states and parts of the country, including its capital Addis Ababa and such. The exact threat or plans of the arrested terrorists was not disclosed to the public by the organization: and what type of infrastructure, religious, or economic or such attacks being planned were not specified.

=== List of Directors ===
Name	Native Name	Tenure
Lieutenant Workneh Gebeyehu	ሌተናል ወርቅነህ ገበየሁ	1941-1960
Solomon Kedir	ሰለሞን ከድር	1960-1974
Colonel Tesfaye Woldesilassie	ኮሎኔል ተስፋዬ ወልደስላሴ	1974-1991
Kuma Demeksa	ኩማ ደመቅሳ	1991-1995
Kinfe Gebremedhin	ክንፈ ገብረመድህን	1995-2001
Getachew Assefa	ጌታቸው አሰፋ	2001-2018
Adem Mohammed	አደም ሞሃመድ	7 June 2018 – 28 June 2020
Demelash Gebremichael	ደምመላሽ ጌብሬሚካኤል	28 June 2020 – 8 November 2020
Temesgen Tiruneh	ተመስገን ጥሩነህ	8 November 2020 – 8 February 2024
Redwan Hussien	ሬድዋን ሑሴን	8 February 2024 - Incumbent

== Domestic agencies ==
=== National level ===
The NISS is also tasked with graduating and training Republican Guards in the University of National Intelligence and Security. "The Republican Guard students must graduate The National Intelligence and Security University College, which is administered by the NISS. This university, which is operated by the National Intelligence and Security Service, is meant to train them in their disciplinary duties, after they finish and complete their physical trainings in Ethiopia." The Role of protecting the President and Prime Minister and their respective families transferred from the NISS to the Ethiopian Republican Guard a branch of the Ethiopian Armed forces.

Although the Republican Guard protects High ranking visiting dignitaries, heads of state and government, the NISS with INSA (signals intelligence agency) would provide intelligence towards the Republican Guard for risk assessment if any threats are found by law are required to cooperate. (Note: All government agencies are required to cooperate with each other in areas of over lapsing jurisdiction and as such cooperation is an integral and innate aspect of the greater security apparatus)They also train aviation authorities, to control checkpoints in ports of commerce, and airports, and border points for foreign goods and peoples and citizens coming in and out the country.

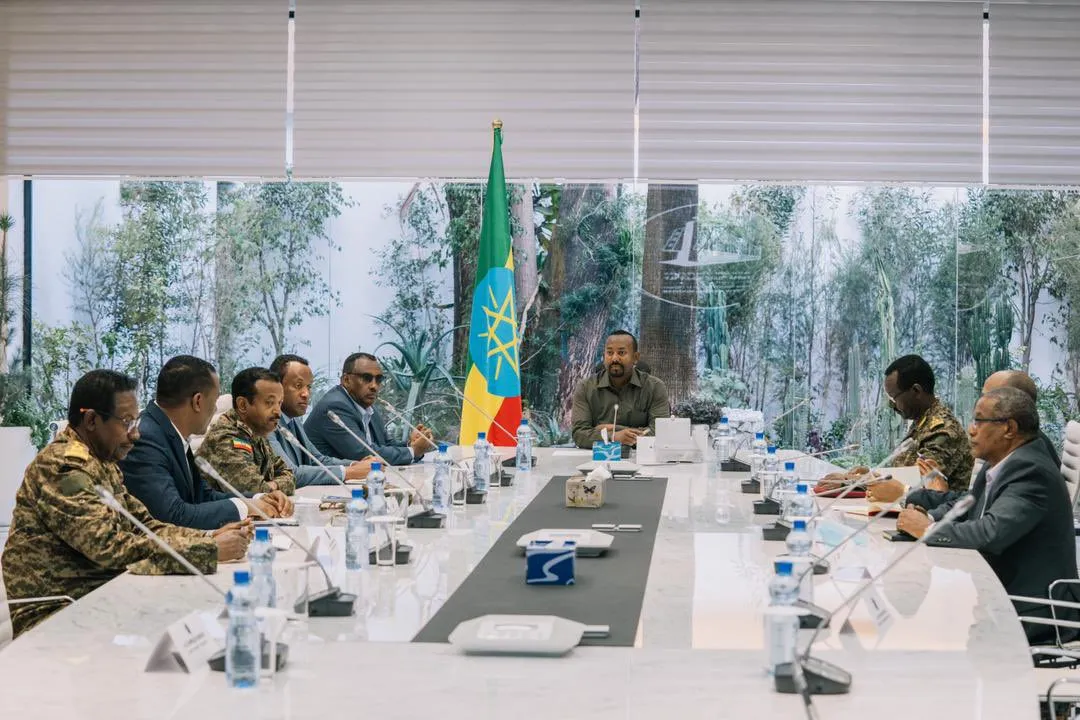
The Ethiopian National Security Council conveying on December 10, 2021, in the midst of the Tigray War

=== National Security Council ===
The NISS with its sister agency the EFP are both permanent members of the National Security Council (NSC) of Ethiopia and as such has played a crucial role in the war in Tigray, in the country's northernmost regional state. It with the National Defense Force and Ministry of Defense of Ethiopia and its various branches has been able to orchestrate capture, execute former TPLF leaders while in guerrilla warfare. As part of the NSC the NISS directly reports to the Prime Minister's Office and nonetheless in addition to the Ministry of Peace as its parent department. (Note: The directors of both the NISS, Federal Police Commission including officials of the Ethiopian military and respective chief of staff and generals led by the Office of Prime Minister during various reporting's of any and all national security council meetings have been present and are members of the council at all levels. But at times regional government administrators are invited as seen in various instances and coverage, and are fundamentally distinct from the 'federal national security council.')

Seal	Organization	Parent organization	Federal department	Date est.
	Office of the Prime Minister (PMO)	Government of Ethiopia	Constitution of Ethiopia	1909
	National Intelligence and Security Service (NISS)	Ministry of Peace	Cabinet	1941
	Federal Police (EFP)	Ministry of Peace	Cabinet	1995
	Information Network Security Agency (INSA)	Ministry of Peace	Cabinet	2006
	National Defence Force	Ministry of Defense	Cabinet	1907

=== Joint National Counter-Terrorism Division ===
The NISS leads the Joint National Counter-Terrorism Division or (JNCTD) which leads crackdowns against suspected criminal activities related to terror in Ethiopia and such. The Ethiopian Federal Police assisting with manpower and the Ministry of Justice's Legal Affairs Directorate and Action Plan Coordination Office enabling legal remedies and actions against suspects as the legal arm of the government of Ethiopia. Nonetheless, the NISS role as the sole prerogative of the country's anti-terror organization besides the military puts lawmakers and government policy makers on the pen stroke sustainable to possible bias reports on certain actions. (Note: The NISS leads the JNCTD with the Ethiopian Federal Police leading the manpower and the Ministry of Justice the prosecution and legal framework: and thus, the NISS reports to the parliament under its own source(s) and no other organization gives such information possessing a risk of false or unchecked information given to Ethiopian officials.)

Seal	Organization	Parent organization	Federal department	Date est.
	National Intelligence and Security Service (NISS)	Ministry of Peace	Cabinet	1941
	Federal Police (EFP)	Ministry of Peace	Cabinet	1995
	Legal Affairs Directorate and Action Plan Coordination Office	Ministry of Justice	Cabinet	1939
