= Temesgen Tiruneh =

Ethiopian politician

- ተመስገን ጥሩነህ
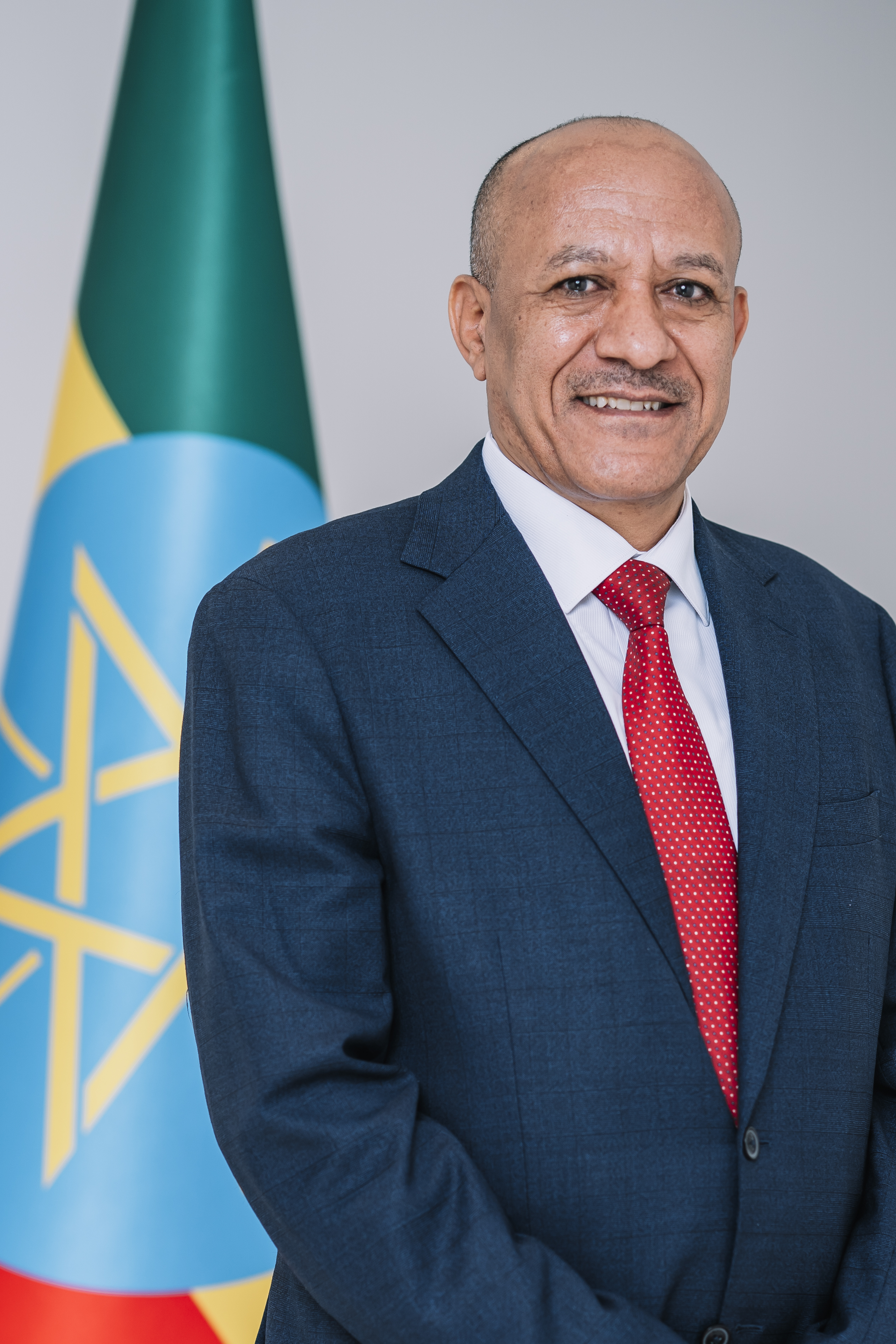

Deputy Prime Minister of Ethiopia
- Incumbent
- Assumed office 8 February 2024 Serving with Adem Farah
- Preceded by: Demeke Mekonnen

Director General of the National Intelligence and Security Service
- In office 8 November 2020 – 8 February 2024
- President: Sahle-Work Zewde
- Prime Minister: Abiy Ahmed
- Preceded by: Demelash Gebremichael
- Succeeded by: Redwan Hussein

Chief Administrator of Amhara Region
- In office 22 July 2019 – 8 November 2020
- Preceded by: Lake Ayalew (acting); Ambachew Mekonnen
- Succeeded by: Agegnehu Teshager

Director General of the Information Network Security Agency
- In office 20 April 2018 – 6 February 2020
- Preceded by: Tekleberhan Woldearegay
- Succeeded by: Shumete Gizaw

Personal details
- Born: Bichena, Gojjam Province, Ethiopian Empire
- Party: Prosperity Party
- Education: Microlink Information Technology College (BA); University of Greenwich (MA)

Military service
- Allegiance: Ethiopia
- Branch/service: Ethiopian Army
- Years of service: 1991–2010
- Rank: Major
- Unit: Intelligence Corps
- Commands: Information Network Security Agency
- Battles/wars: Eritrean–Ethiopian War; Tigray War

Temesgen Tiruneh (Amharic: ተመስገን ጥሩነህ) is an Ethiopian politician who is serving as the current Deputy Prime Minister of Ethiopia since 8 February 2024. He previously served as the director general of National Intelligence and Security Service of Ethiopia since 2020.

On 8 November 2020, Temesgen Tiruneh was appointed to the position of director general of NISS by Prime Minister Abiy Ahmed, in the midst of the Tigray War. He was the former president of Amhara state. He was replaced from his former position of Amhara regional state president by Agegnehu Teshager.

== Early life and education ==
Temesegen Tiruneh was born in the small town of Bichena, Gojjam Province, Ethiopia. He attended primary and secondary school at Belay Zeleke school. He then joined the Ethiopian National Defense Force where he took primary military intelligence training. He later joined the Microlink Information Technology College where he graduated with a BA in Computer Science. He later attended University of Greenwich and graduated with MA in Transformational leadership.

== Political career ==
=== President of Amhara Region ===
On 27 July 2019, Temesgen has been named as the head of Amhara Region amidst the crisis following the June 22 coup attempt. He has worked as a security advisor of the Information Network Security Agency (INSA) from 20 April 2018.

=== Director of the National Intelligence and Security Service ===
Temesgen as the director of the leading intelligence agency has said many statements of security treat. He publicly said that "The TPLF Junta dreamt of disrupting the central government by mobilizing its lapdogs it dubbed “Federalist Forces”, but, things have gone the other way around as all Ethiopians stand in unison against it.” Temesgen also made another statement vowing to destroy the TPLF from the face of the earth. He also said that the NISS was teaming up with the Federal Police and the National Defense force to defeat the terrorist TPLF. Temesgen said in a statement “This divisive rhetoric is TPLF’s destructive tool that it has been implementing since its very inception." He also said the TPLF are not here to destroy the Amhara people but the whole nation as a whole.

=== Deputy Prime Minister ===
On 8 February 2024, the House of People's Representatives (HoPR) appointed Temesgen as a Deputy Prime Minister of Ethiopia, replacing Demeke Mekonnen who announced his intention for resignation on 26 January.
