= Asaminew Tsige =

Ethiopian general (1958/1959 – 2019)

- አሳምነው ጽጌ

Chief of the Amhara Region security
- In office 2018–2019

Personal details
- Born: 1958/1959 Bugna, Wollo Province, Ethiopian Empire
- Died: 24 June 2019
- Cause of death: Gunshot wounds to the head
- Party: Amhara Democratic Party
- Other political affiliations: Ginbot 7

Military service
- Allegiance: Ethiopia
- Branch/service: Ethiopian Army
- Battles/wars: Eritrean–Ethiopian War

Brigadier General Asaminew Tsige (Ge'ez: አሳምነው ጽጌ; 1958/1959 – 24 June 2019) was an Ethiopian military officer who served as chief of the regional security forces in the Amhara Region during part of 2019. He had previously been serving a life sentence in relation to an alleged coup attempt staged by Ginbot 7. During his imprisonment, he was allegedly tortured and lost sight in one eye. He was released in 2018 and restored to his prior rank and pension.

== Biography ==
Asaminew was part of the Amhara ethnic group, which is Ethiopia's second largest ethnic group. He had been known for his hardline ethnic nationalism and was particularly popular among a segment of the Amhara youth. After his release from prison and appointment to a government post, he advocated for more autonomy for Amhara and called members of his ethnic group to arm themselves and join local militias. The International Crisis Group said his activities helped the rise of the National Movement of Amhara (NaMA), which emerged as a challenger to the Amhara Democratic Party (ADP). NaMA was established before the coming of Gen. Asaminew to the government power.

Asaminew was accused of being behind an alleged attempted coup in the Amhara Region in 2019. The President of Amhara region Ambachew Mekonnen was killed during the alleged attempt. In a related event, the Chief of Staff of the Ethiopian National Defense Force, Gen. Se'are Mekonnen, and his aide, Maj. Gen. Gizae Aberra, were assassinated by a bodyguard, the office of Ethiopian Prime Minister Dr. Abiy Ahmed said. Se'are and Ambachew were close allies of the prime minister. Following the alleged attempted coup, he was on the run, with his whereabouts unknown, until he was shot dead by police on 24 June, after 36 hours at large, Ethiopian state television announced.

== See also ==
- Assassination of Girma Yeshitila
