= Abebaw =

Abebaw is a given name. Notable people with the name include:

- Abebaw Butako (born 1987), Ethiopian footballer
- Abebaw Tadesse, Ethiopian general
