= Demelash Gebremichael =

Ethiopian politician

- ደምመላሽ ጌብሬሚካኤል

Commissioner General of the Ethiopian Federal Police
- Incumbent
- Assumed office 8 November 2020
- Appointed by: Abiy Ahmed
- President: Sahle-Work Zewde; Taye Atske Selassie
- Prime Minister: Abiy Ahmed
- Preceded by: Endashaw Tassew

Director General of the National Intelligence and Security Service
- In office 28 June 2020 – 8 November 2020
- Preceded by: Adem Mohammed
- Succeeded by: Temesgen Tiruneh

Demelash Gebremichael (Amharic: ደምመላሽ ጌብሬሚካኤል) is an Ethiopian politician who is serving as the Commissioner General of the Ethiopian Federal Police, he was appointed to the rank by Prime Minister Abiy Ahmed since 8 November 2020. Before he became the commissioner general of the federal police, he was the Director General of the National Intelligence and Security Service (NISS) from 28 June 2019 to 8 November 2020.

== Office position ==
After Prime Minister Abiy Ahmed made Demelash Gebremichael General Commissioner of the Federal Police Commission, he also made Temesgen Tiruneh the Director of the National Intelligence and Security Service (NISS). Gebremichael was a close friend to prime minister Abiy Ahmed, before he served as the director general of NISS he was the Deputy Chief of NISS. His boss was killed in an assassination as the Director of NISS. Abiy Ahmed appointed him to take over Adem's former position at the NISS and appointed Mola Hailemariam (Lut. Gen) as chief of ground forces member. A few days later after the assassination of other General Se'are Mekonnen, the NISS director Adem was appointed Chief of Staff of the armed forces and Demelash become the director of the NISS.
