= Adem Mohammed =

Ethiopian military general and politician

- አደም ሞሃመድ

Ambassador of Ethiopia to Turkey
- Incumbent
- Assumed office 25 January 2021
- President: Sahle-Work Zewde; Taye Atske Selassie
- Prime Minister: Abiy Ahmed

Chief of General Staff
- In office 28 June 2019 – 12 November 2020
- President: Sahle-Work Zewde
- Prime Minister: Abiy Ahmed
- Preceded by: General Se'are Mekonnen
- Succeeded by: General Birhanu Jula

Director of the National Intelligence and Security Service
- In office 7 June 2018 – 28 June 2020
- President: Mulatu Teshome; Sahle-Work Zewde
- Prime Minister: Abiy Ahmed
- Preceded by: Getachew Assefa
- Succeeded by: Demelash Gebremichael

Adem Mohammed (Amharic: አደም ሞሃመድ) is an Ethiopian military general and politician who is serving as an ambassador of Ethiopia to Turkey since 2021. He was the director of the National Intelligence and Security Service (NISS) from 2018 to 2020 and Chief General Staff of the Ethiopian National Defense Force (ENDF) from 2019 to 2020.

== Political career ==
On 7 June 2018, Adem succeeded Getachew Assefa as the National Intelligence and Security Service (NISS) director. On 28 June 2019, he was appointed by Prime Minister Abiy Amhed as Chief of General Staff of the Ethiopian National Defense Force (ENDF) following assassination of Major General Se'are Mekonnen in Bahir Dar coup attempt on 22 June. On 25 January 2021, he was appointed as Ambassador of Ethiopia to Turkey.

Military offices
Preceded by Se'are Mekonnen	Chief of General Staff; 2019–2020	Succeeded by Birhanu Jula
