= Girma Yeshitila =

Ethiopian politician (1973–2023)

- ግርማ የሺጥላ

Head of Prosperity Party, Amhara Region

Personal details
- Born: 1973 Mehal Meda, Shewa Province, Ethiopian Empire (present-day Ethiopia)
- Died: 27 April 2023 (age 49 or 50) North Shewa, Amhara Region, Ethiopia
- Cause of death: Assassination (gunshot wounds)
- Party: Prosperity Party

Girma Yeshitila (Amharic: ግርማ የሺጥላ; 1973 – 27 April 2023) was an Ethiopian politician and the head of the Prosperity Party in the Amhara region who was assassinated in 2023.

== Death ==
The government reported that he was traveling for work when he and his bodyguards were shot on 27 April 2023, in Menz, North Shewa, Ethiopia. The Ethiopian Prime Minister, Abiy Ahmed, blamed "extremists" but the ethnic Amhara public and journalists accused Abiy's regime of the plot and assassination. At least 14 other people including Girma’s wife and police officers were injured. Another series of assassinations of the Amhara regional president and six other members were also reported in June 2019 which the government described as an ″attempted coup.″ As of 10 May 2023, no independent investigation was made for all of these murders.

== See also ==
- Asaminew Tsige
- Assassination of Amhara regional leaders
