= Information Network Security Agency =

Ethiopian government signals intelligence and cybersecurity agency

Information Network Security Administration
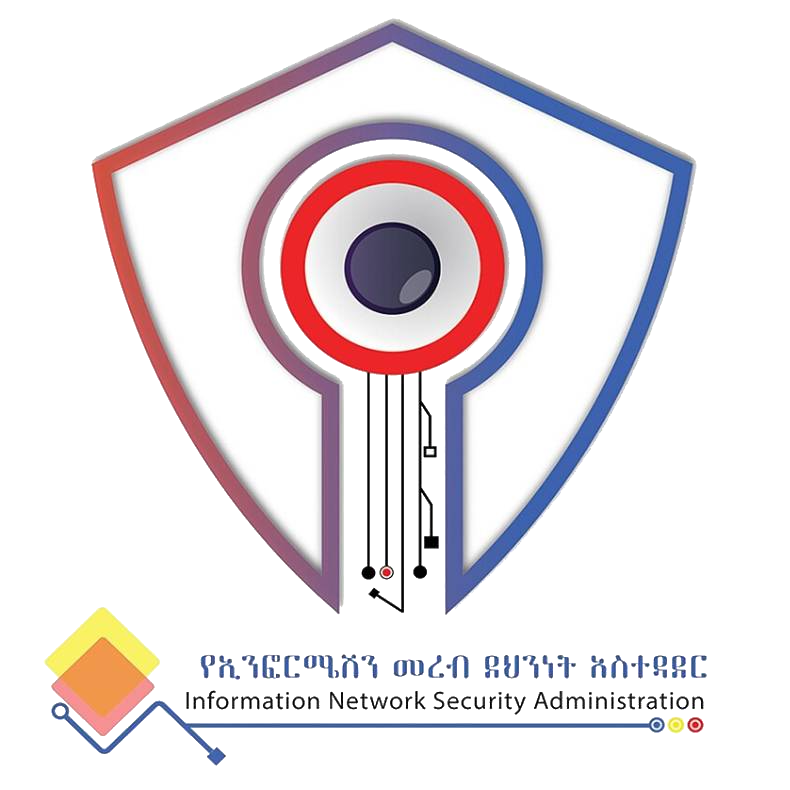

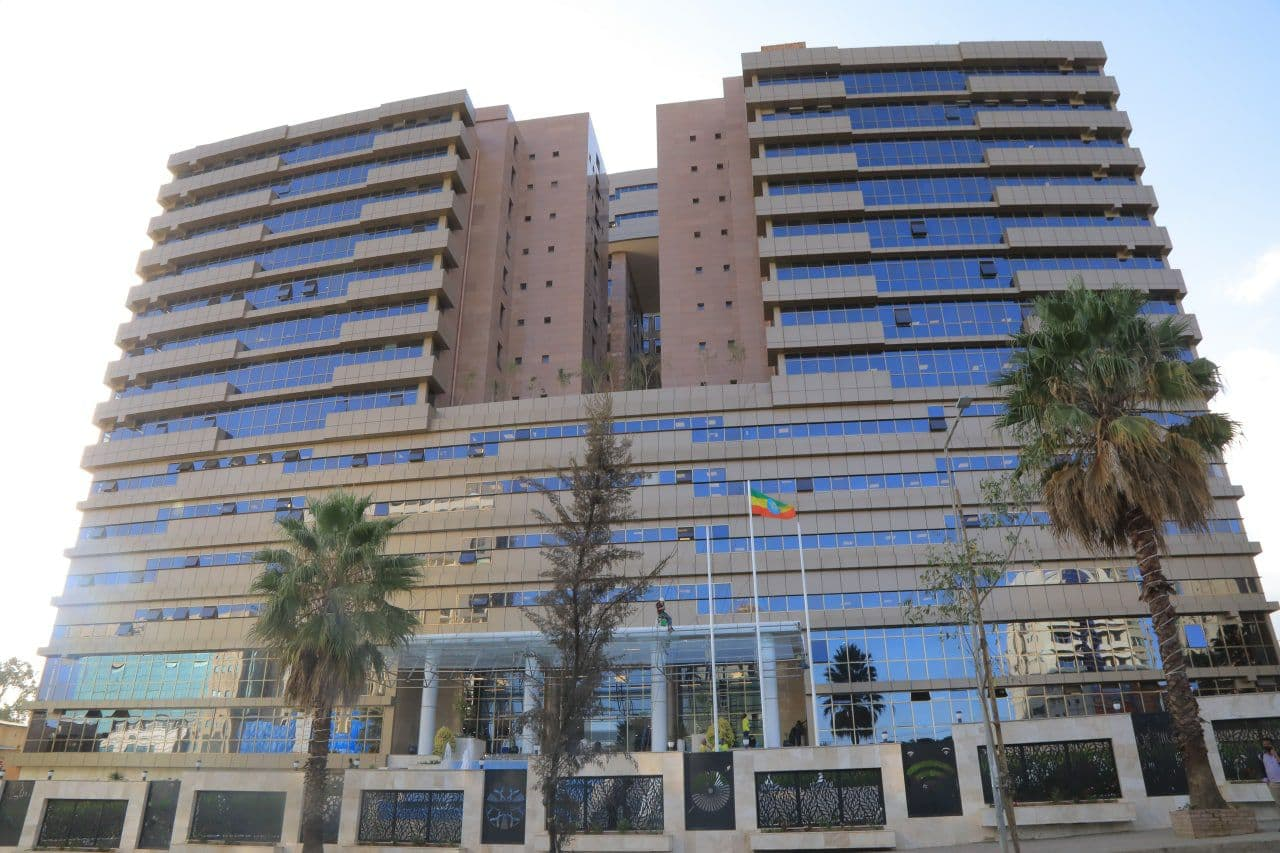

Agency overview
- Formed: 2006
- Jurisdiction: Government of Ethiopia
- Headquarters: Wollo Sefer, Ethio China St, Addis Ababa, Ethiopia
- Employees: Classified
- Annual budget: Classified
- Agency executive: Tigist Hamid, Director General of the Information Network Security Administration
- Parent agency: Office of Prime Minister of Ethiopia
- Website: https://www.insa.gov.et

The Information Network Security Administration or INSA (Amharic: የመረጃ መረብ ደህንነት አስተዳደር, romanized: Yemereja Mereb Dehninet Astedader) is the national signals intelligence and cybersecurity agency of Ethiopia, founded when the Ethiopian People's Revolutionary Democratic Front (EPRDF) was the ruling party of Ethiopia.

== History ==
The Information Network Security Administration (INSA) was established during the Ethiopian People's Revolutionary Democratic Front (EPRDF) era. As part of the war on terror, Ethiopia emerged as an 'anchor state' for American policy and Western interests in the Horn of Africa. Modelled after the National Security Agency, INSA was created with support from the United States government, particularly in the context of the 2006 invasion of Somalia aimed at toppling an Islamic government. The original purpose of the agency was to intercept and analyze intelligence primarily from Somalia.

The legal basis of creating INSA in 2006 was the Council of Ministers Regulation No.130/2006, with goals including defence of Ethiopian information infrastructure. Among the initial activities of INSA was spying on dissidents among the Ethiopian diaspora using "sophisticated intrusion and surveillance software", and to lay legal charges against journalists and opposition activists and politicians of "treason" and "terrorism". The Council of Ministers Regulation No.250/2011 and Proclamation No.808/2013 updated the initial legal definitions of INSA.

In 2021, INSA shifted to new headquarters in a building constructed near Wello Sefer at a cost of Br 2.1 billion. The new building is shared by the Ministry of Peace, Artificial Intelligence Center, and Financial Intelligence Center.

== Leadership and structure ==
On 20 April 2018, Temesgen Tiruneh was appointed Director-General of INSA, who later become director of NISS. As of February 2021, the head of INSA was Shumete Gizaw. In 2024 Tigist Hamid became Director-General of INSA, replacing Solomon Soka.

In October 2018, responsibility for INSA was given to the Ministry of Peace. It was reverted to the office of the prime minister in October 2021.

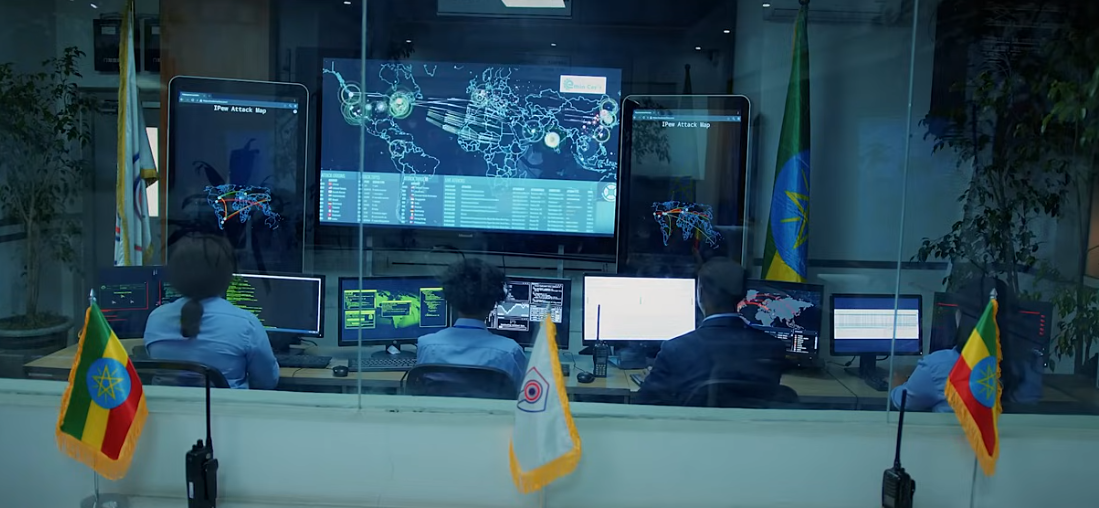
Officers working for INSA at the Addis Ababa Headquarters and Head Office

== Activities ==
=== Cyberdefence ===
INSA stated in 2023 that during nine months, it had limited the damage from 4400 attempted and successful cyberattacks against Ethiopian institutions.

=== Surveillance ===
INSA plays a role in surveillance and internet censorship in close cooperation with Ethio telecom and other government agencies. As of 2014, INSA had the technical ability to listen to live mobile phone calls, while Ethio telecom did not. In 2013, INSA employees had access to the email and other passwords of users of Woredanet (funded by the World Bank and the African Development Bank), Schoolnet (funded by the World Bank and the United Nations Development Programme), and Agrinet.

==== Role in arrests of dissidents ====
In 2014, Human Rights Watch found that INSA played a significant role in police and security services' surveillance of Ethiopian citizens' private communications that led to the arbitrary detention of political dissidents.

=== Social networks ===
In 2021, INSA ran accounts promoting Ethiopian federal government points of view on Facebook. Facebook closed the accounts, describing them as "inauthentic". The Director of INSA described the accounts as covering "the reality in Ethiopia" and stated that INSA would develop an Ethiopian social media network.
