= HiLCoE College =

Private college in Addis Ababa, Ethiopia

HiLCoE School of Computer Science and Technology
- Established: 1997
- Director: Ahmed Hussien (PhD)
- Location: Addis Ababa, Ethiopia
- Website: www.hilcoe.net

HiLCoE School of Computer Science and Technology is the first privately owned college in Addis Ababa, Ethiopia. The name HiLCoE stands for Higher Learning Center of Excellence. A specialized computer science institution, it was established in January 1997 by two information technology professionals, Ahmed Hussien (PhD) and Nassir Dino (PhD). Now located at the heart of Addis Ababa arat kilo General Wingate Street 2QH6+XRV, HiLCoE offers undergraduate and postgraduate degrees in Computer Science and Software Engineering. With proper accreditation from the Ministry of Education, the institution launched two Masters programs in Software Engineering and Computer Science in September 2009. It has now begun offering undergraduate courses in software engineering.

== Notable alumni ==
- Samrawit Fikru, founder and CEO of Hybrid Designs
