= Kinfe Gebremedhin =

Ethiopian military commander (died 2001)

Commander Kinfe Gebremedhin
- ክንፈ ገብረመድህን
- Died: 13 May 2001; Addis Ababa, Ethiopia
- Military career
- Allegiance: TPLF
- Service years: c.1980-1991
- Conflicts: Ethiopian Civil War

Chief of Security and Immigration
- In office 1995 – 13 May 2001
- President: Negasso Gidada
- Prime Minister: Meles Zenawi
- Preceded by: post established
- Succeeded by: Getachew Assefa

Kinfe Gebremedhin (Tigrinya: ክንፈ ገብረመድህን; died 13 May 2001) was an Ethiopian military commander of the Tigrayan People's Liberation Front (TPLF) who fought against the military known as the Derg. Upon the overthrow of the Derg, Kinfe served as Chief of Security and Immigration in the new government and became a right-hand man of Meles Zenawi. He was murdered in 2001 by a fellow officer, which resulted in one of the most high-profile criminal cases in Ethiopian history.

== Military career ==
In the 1980s, he served as a commander in the TPLF against the military government. He was a Durham University graduate.

== Political career ==
Following the TPLF victory, a new government under Meles Zenawi took power in 1995. Kinfe, a former TPLF Chief of Security, was appointed to lead the Security, Immigration, and Refugee Affairs Authority (previously the Ministry of Internal Security) – a position that saw him report directly to Zenawi. His role in internal security affairs was said to possibly surpass those of the ministers of defence and justice, and was seen as a sign that Zenawi felt the greatest threat to the Ethiopian state was internal rather than external.

== Murder ==
In May 2001, Kinfe walked into an Officer's club in the Ethiopian capital Addis Ababa. He was killed when Major Tsehaye Woldeselassie shot him from the back as Kinfe passed him. Tsehaye was quickly arrested. Major Tsehaye's motive was unknown, but it was speculated that it was due to a dispute between former members of the TPLF, with some dissatisfied over the outcome of the recent war with Eritrea.

Alternatively, Paulos Milkias has suggested the motive may have been linked to internal politics: in the weeks before his assassination Kinfe had removed opponents of Zenawi from the Armed Forces and from opposition groups, with some killed and others forcibly 'disappeared'.

Kinfe's funeral was held in the Addis Ababa, with thousands of people in attendance. Tsehaye was tried, found guilty, and sentenced to death; he was executed on August 6, 2007.
