= Getachew Assefa =

Ethiopian politician

- ጌታቸው አሰፋ

Director General of the National Intelligence and Security Service
- In office 2001 – 7 June 2018
- President: Negasso Gidada; Girma Wolde-Giorgis; Mulatu Teshome
- Prime Minister: Meles Zenawi; Hailemariam Desalegn; Abiy Ahmed
- Preceded by: Kinfe Gebremedhin
- Succeeded by: Adem Mohammed

Personal details
- Born: Mekelle, Tigray Province, Ethiopian Empire
- Party: Tigray People's Liberation Front
- Other political affiliations: EPRDF
- Spouse: Selamawit Gebremeskel
- Children: Yared Getachew; Nahom Getachew; Ruth Getachew

Getachew Assefa (Tigrinya: ጌታቸው አሰፋ) is an Ethiopian politician and senior member of the Tigray People's Liberation Front (TPLF). He had served as the Director General of the National Intelligence and Security Service (NISS) from 2001 until Prime Minister Abiy Ahmed came to power in 2018.

During the Tigray War, Getachew has been subject of one of TPLF's fugitives by the Ethiopian government. Reports claim that he fled to Sudan or Eritrea to seek asylum and he was sanctioned by the US government for his alleged human rights violations in the war.

== Early life and career ==
Getachew Assefa was born in late 1940s in Mekelle in Tigray Province. In 1975, he joined the Tigray People's Liberation Front (TPLF), who was fighting against the Derg regime. After the downfall of the Derg in 1991, he became a senior member of the Ethiopian People's Revolutionary Democratic Front (EPRDF).

Getachew is a member of TPLF. He was wanted by the Ethiopian government under Abiy Ahmed and accused of crime against humanity, corruption and treason. During the Tigray War, he was hiding to the Ethiopian federal forces in the Tigray Region and secretly commands the TDF forces.

=== Director General of NISS ===
In 2001, Getachew was appointed as Director General of the National Intelligence and Security Service (NISS) by Prime Minister Meles Zenawi. He then became the Chief advisor of Meles. During the office, Getachew intervened to War in Somalia in 2006 and Ethiopian–Eritrean border conflict.

He served the NISS until 2018. After Prime Minister Abiy Ahmed came to power in April 2018, Getachew was opposed to Abiy's earlier reforms and policies and continued supporting the TPLF. In June 2018, he was removed from the office.

=== Tigray War ===
Upon the federal government issued arrest warrant to TPLF's senior officials amidst the Tigray War in 2020, Getachew was one of the most wanted TPLF figure whom the government would endow 10 million birr for his capture. The government accused him of committing extrajudicial killings, torture, arbitrary detention and surveillance of dissents and journalists. He was also sanctioned by the United States government for his alleged human rights plot in the war.

In the course of war, reports claimed that Getachew fled to Sudan or Eritrea in order to seek asylum or support from foreign allies.

== Personal life ==
Getachew is married, with four children but there is little information public about his family.
