= Samrawit Fikru =

Ethiopian entrepreneur and businesswoman

- ሳምራዊት ፍቅሩ
- Born: Asella, Ethiopia
- Education: Microlink Information Technology College; HiLCoE School of Computer Science and Technology (BsC)
- Occupation: Software developer
- Known for: Founder and CEO of Hybrid Designs PLC; RIDE

Samrawit Fikru (Amharic: ሳምራዊት ፍቅሩ) is an Ethiopian entrepreneur and businesswoman and the founder and Chief Executive Officer of Hybrid Designs PLC, a technology company that developed, RIDE.RIDE.

== Early life and education ==
Fikru was born in Asella, Ethiopia. She received her diploma in software engineering from MicroLink Information Technology College in 2004. She graduated with a BSc in computer science from the HiLCoE School of Computer Science and Technology in 2006.

== Career ==
Fikru founded the software development company Hybrid Designs in 2014. The same year, Hybrid Designs released RIDE as an SMS-based ridesharing service. It was relaunched as a mobile app with a backing call center in July 2017. RIDE was inspired by the difficulty Fikru experienced trying to hire a taxi cab after late nights at work. She also wanted to create a service to address the safety concerns felt by herself and others in trying to find a taxi, and developed RIDE to help address these gaps.

As of 2020, the app has tens of thousands of users and has been downloaded over 50,000 times. The development staff for the app is 90% female. Fikru aims to inspire other women with her work: "Women-owned business are growing in number; now we need more young girls to access the finances to make their creative ideas happen."

Fikru's entrepreneurial interests have also extended beyond transportation. In October 2022, she expanded into the creative and entertainment sector with the launch of Sewasew, a multimedia streaming and distribution platform dedicated to Ethiopian content including Ethiopian music, podcasts, audiobooks and books.

== Honors and awards ==
- Fikru was recognized as one of the Rest of World's 100 Global Tech Changemakers
- Fikru's success as a tech entrepreneur and her inspiration to young women were recognised by her inclusion on the BBC's 100 Women list in 2022.
