= Samora Yunis =

Ethiopian military officer

- ሳሞራ መሐመድ ዩንስ
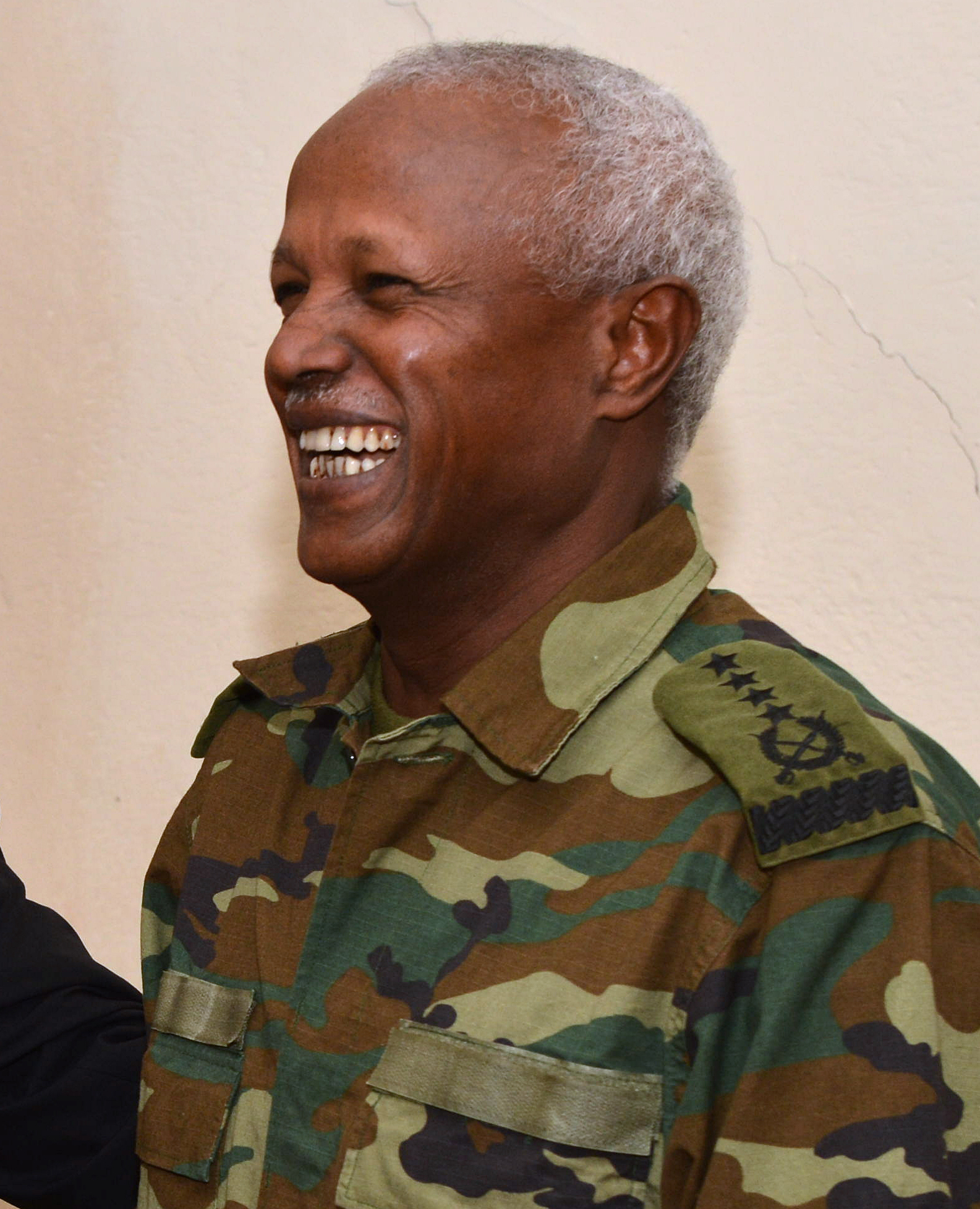
- Gen. Samora Yunis in 2013
- Born: 1949 (age 77–78); Tigray Province, Ethiopian Empire
- Children: 3 or 2 (rumored)
- Military career
- Allegiance: Ethiopia
- Branch: Ethiopian National Defence Forces
- Rank: General
- Commands: Chief of General Staff
- Conflicts: Ethiopian Civil War; Insurgency in Ogaden; Eritrean-Ethiopian War; Somali Civil War (2006-2009)

Chief of General Staff
- In office 2001 – 7 June 2018
- Preceded by: General Tsadkan Gebretensae
- Succeeded by: General Se'are Mekonnen

Samora Muhammad Yunis (Ge’ez: ሳሞራ መሐመድ ዩንስ) is an Ethiopian military officer. Born in the Tigray Region in the north of the country, Yunis rose to be a four-star general in the Ethiopian National Defence Forces and eventually Chief of the General Staff in 2001. He would serve until 2018.

== Biography ==
Yunis fought for the military wing of the Ethiopian People's Revolutionary Democratic Front, playing a leading role in the Battle of Shire (18–19 February 1989). He was made Chief of General Staff in 2001, when he replaced Tsadkan Gebretensae.

According to Human Rights Watch, credible sources identify General Samora as a member of the leadership group which met in Jijiga following the attack on oilmen at Abole on 24 April 2007, to determine an appropriate response to this raid. On 7 June 2018, it was announced that Yunis would be replaced by Seare Mekonen as the new Chief of General Staff.

In 2017, he received the Order of the Two Niles from Sudan.

Military offices
Preceded by Tsadkan Gebretensae	Chief of General Staff; 2001–2018	Succeeded by Se'are Mekonnen
