= Shumete Gizaw =

Ethiopian politician, educator and researcher

- ሹመቴ ግዛው

Director-General of the Information Network Security Agency
- In office 6 February 2020 – August 2022
- President: Sahle-Work Zewde
- Prime Minister: Abiy Ahmed
- Preceded by: Temesgen Tiruneh
- Succeeded by: Solomon Soka

Chief of Staff of Prime Minister
- In office 15 May 2019 – 6 February 2020
- President: Sahle-Work Zewde
- Prime Minister: Abiy Ahmed
- Preceded by: Shimelis Abdisa
- Succeeded by: Shimelis Abdisa

Personal details
- Born: Ethiopia
- Education: Addis Ababa University (PhD)

Shumete Gizaw (Amharic: ሹመቴ ግዛው) is an Ethiopian politician, researcher and educator who was served as the Director General of the Information Network Security Agency from 2020 to 2022. Previously, he has been the former Chief of Staff of Prime Minister Abiy Ahmed, and the former State Minister of Science and Technology.

Outside of politics, he works as a motivational speaker and researcher, having published articles in academic journals.

== Career ==
Shumete Gizaw holds a PhD in Geography and Environmental Studies from Addis Ababa University. He has served as an Associate Professor in Environmental Studies, Planning, and Development. His work includes research with publications in academic journals. In addition to his teaching experience, he has held university leadership positions, including Dean and Academic and Research Vice President at Dilla University from 2013 to 2016. He is also a motivational speaker; focusing on the concept of the “Pyramid of Contribution".

Shimeles served as the Chief of Staff of Prime Minister Abiy Ahmed from 2019 to 2020. On 6 February 2020, Shumete has been appointed as the Director General of the Information Network Security Agency (INSA). He was succeeded by Solomon Soka in 2022. Currently he is working in "Organization of Educational Cooperation". Many tagged him with "Servant and Transformational Leader".
