= Microlink Information Technology College =

Private college in Ethiopia

- ማይክሮሊንክ ኢንፎርሜሽን ቴክኖሎጂ ኮሌጅ
- Type: Private
- Established: 1998
- Accreditation: CISCO
- Location: Addis Ababa, Mekelle, Ethiopia
- Language: Amharic; English

Microlink Information Technology College (MLITC) is a private college in Mekelle, Tigray Region, with a second campus located in Addis Ababa. It was established in 1998 and it is ICT based higher education institution in Ethiopia. Microlink is accredited by CISCO.

== History ==
Microlink Information Technology College was established in 1998 in Mekelle, Tigray Region. It is ICT based higher education institution and pioneer of private college in Ethiopia. The college mission states that it provides educational quality by implementing innovative technology in teaching and benchmarking its services against the best in the sector. The college has been accredited by CISCO.

Its campus is located in Piassa, Addis Ababa beside St. George's Cathedral Church.

Website: http://www.microlinkitc.com/,

== Notable alumni ==
- Abiy Ahmed
- Samrawit Fikru
- Temesgen Tiruneh
