= Tsadkan Gebretensae =

Ethiopian military officer

- ጻድቃን ገብረትንሣኤ
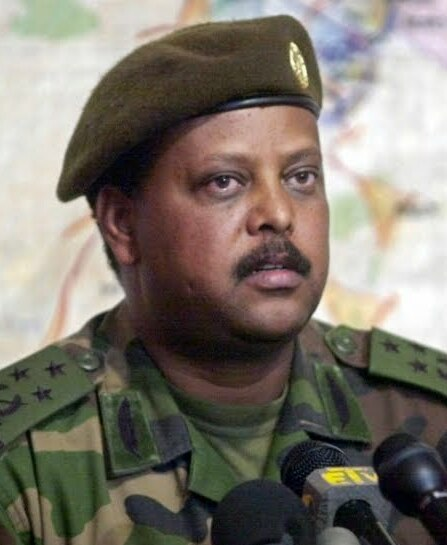
- Tsadkan in the 1990s
- Born: c.1953 Chercher, Raya Azebo, Tigray Province, Ethiopian Empire
- Military career
- Allegiance: TPLF (1976–1991); Ethiopia (1991–2001); Tigray Defense Forces (2020–2025)
- Branch: TPLF; ENDF; TDF
- Service years: 1976–2001; 2020–present
- Rank: Lieutenant general
- Conflicts: Ethiopian Civil War; Insurgency in Ogaden; Eritrean–Ethiopian War; Tigray War

Vice President of the Tigray Region
- In office 5 April 2023 – 8 April 2025
- Preceded by: Post established
- Succeeded by: Amanuel Assefa

Chief of General Staff
- In office 1991–2001
- Preceded by: Addis Tedla
- Succeeded by: General Samora Yunis

Tsadkan Gebretensae (Ge'ez: ጻድቃን ገብረትንሣኤ; born c.1953) is an Ethiopian former military officer and member of the central command of the Tigray Defense Forces. In 1976, Tsadkan joined Tigrayan People's Liberation Front (TPLF), becoming one of its main commanders in the Ethiopian Civil War. Following the war, he became chief of staff of the Ethiopian National Defense Force (ENDF), rebuilding the force and leading it in the Eritrean-Ethiopian War. After the start of the Tigray War in 2020, he rejoined the Tigray's military leadership. He is widely regarded as one of Africa's best military thinkers and strategists.

Since 2023, he is serving as the vice president of Tigray region.

== Biography ==
Tsadkan was born in the first half of the 1950s (Note: BBC article published on 1 July 2021 gives his age as 68, while The New York Times article published on 22 January 2021 gives his age as 66.) in Chercher, Raya Azebo, Tigray Province. In youth he became friends with another future Tigrayan leader Meles Zenawi, and in 1976 Tsadkan dropped out of the Addis Ababa University's biology faculty to join the Tigrayan People's Liberation Front (TPLF). At the time the TPLF was a small and nascent rebel group fighting against the communist Ethiopian government in the Ethiopian Civil War. By the late 1980s he had distinguished himself as one of the TPLF's most popular field commanders. In May 1991, he led the TPLF's troops in the successful assault on the capital Addis Ababa.

After the end of the civil war in 1991, Tsadkan became general and chief of staff of the Ethiopian National Defence Force (ENDF), leading its rebuilding. He led the reconstruction of the Ethiopian army, but was criticized for lack of ethnic balance when former TPLF commanders formed the core of the force. Under Tsadkan's leadership the ENDF raided an al-Qaeda base in Somalia in 1996, and provided support to rebel forces in Sudan. During the Eritrean–Ethiopian War, he insisted on driving the Ethiopian army into the Eritrean capital of Asmara, but was prevented from doing so by Prime Minister Meles Zenawi. Following the end of the war disagreements within the TPLF led Meles to fire Tsadkan from his position of chief of staff in 2001. Tsadkan later stated that his main issue of dispute with Meles was about lack of democratization in Ethiopia.

Tsadkan earned a master's degree in business administration from the British Open University and one in international policy from the American George Washington University.

Following his dismissal Tsadkan worked as a military advisor for the government of South Sudan and founded Raya Beer brewery and a horticulture business in Raya Azebo. He worked as a board chairperson for several companies, with 8-year tenures at both Ethiopian Shipping Lines and the Methara Sugar Factory, and from 2020 was also on the board of Lion Bank.

Following the outbreak of war between the Ethiopian government and the Tigray Region in 2020, Tsadkan put aside his past differences with the Tigrayan political leadership and joined the Tigray Defense Forces, as part of its central military command. After Tigrayan forces captured Mekelle in 2021, he was praised as the "mastermind" behind TDF recruitment successes.

Alex de Waal of the World Peace Foundation describes him as "one of the finest military strategists of his generation in Africa".

== Explanatory notes ==
Military offices
Preceded by position established	Chief of General Staff; 1991–2001	Succeeded by Samora Yunis
