= Office of the Prime Minister of Ethiopia =

Government agency of Ethiopia

Agency overview
- Jurisdiction: Government of Ethiopia
- Agency executives: Abiy Ahmed, Prime Minister of Ethiopia; Temesgen Tiruneh, Deputy Prime Minister of Ethiopia
- Website: https://pmo.gov.et

The Office of the Prime Minister of Ethiopia is a government body of Ethiopia.

== Organisation ==
There are six structures within the office; these include Prime Minister’s Agenda Setting, Policy and Performance Management Units, Press Secretariat, National Security Department, Office of the First Lady and the Republican Guard

The Republican Guard is tasked with protecting the prime minister and other senior official from security threats.
