= Abebaw Tadesse =

Ethiopian army general

General Abebaw Tadesse
- አበባው ታደሰ

Deputy Chief of General Staff
- Incumbent
- Assumed office 12 November 2020
- President: Sahle-Work Zewde; Taye Atske Selassie
- Prime Minister: Abiy Ahmed
- Preceded by: Field Marshal Birhanu Jula

Personal details
- Born: Wag Hemra, Amhara Region, Ethiopia

Military service
- Allegiance: Ethiopia
- Branch: Ethiopian Army
- Rank: General
- Conflict: Eritrean–Ethiopian War; Tigray War; War in Amhara

Abebaw Tadesse (Amharic: አበባው ታደሰ) is an Ethiopian army general and the current Deputy Chief of General Staff of Ethiopian National Defense Force (ENDF), the second most senior position in the ENDF, since 12 November 2020.

== Military career ==
General Abebaw Tadesse served in various levels of commands and leading the Central Command, which was disbanded and relocated to Southern Command. He carried out a major military operation during the Eritrean–Ethiopian War on the Badme front. He was known for being the only non-Tigrayan general in the Ethiopian Army during the rule of Meles Zenawi as he was from the Agaw ethnic group. Abebaw retired from the army in 2018 but was later recalled during the Tigray War by Commander in Chief of Ethiopian National Defense force, Abiy Ahmed and was appointed as the Deputy Chief of General Staff. In January 2022 Abebaw said in an interview that the Ethiopian army was planning to invade the Tigray Region and "eliminate" Tigrayan forces. He is awarded the Highest Blacklion Heroes Medal in January 2022.
