= Se'are Mekonnen =

Ethiopian army officer (c. 1954 – 2019)

- ሰዐረ መኮንን
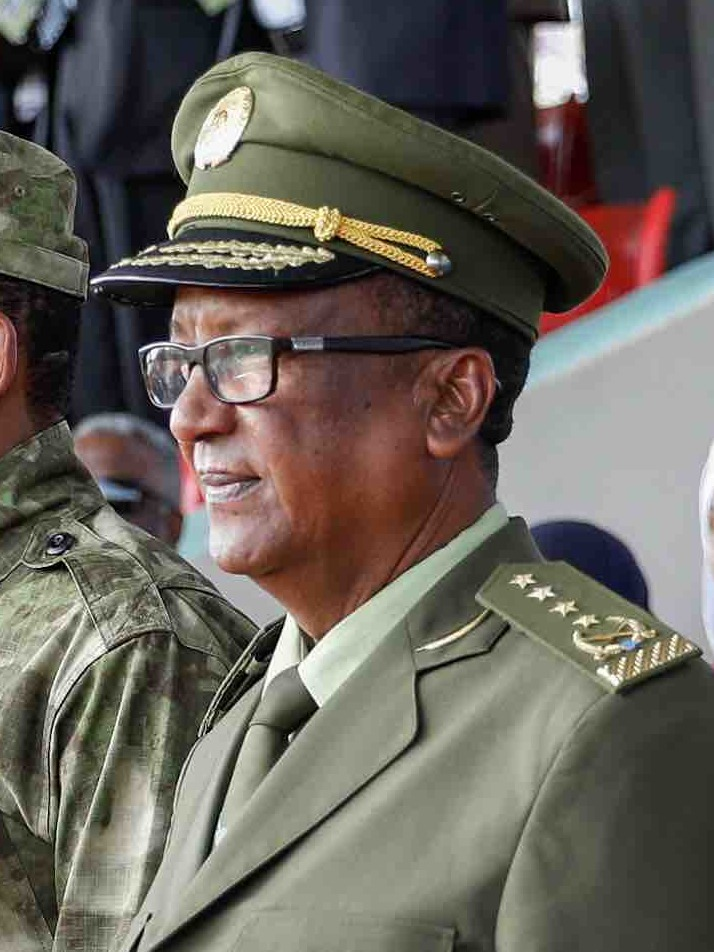
- Se'are during a military parade in February 2019
- Born: 1954; Tigray Province, Ethiopian Empire
- Died: 22 June 2019 (aged 64-65); Addis Ababa, Ethiopia
- Military career
- Allegiance: TPLF (1976–1991); Ethiopia (1991–2019)
- Branch: Ethiopian Army
- Service years: 1976–2019
- Rank: General
- Commands: Chief of General Staff
- Conflicts: Ethiopian Civil War; Eritrean–Ethiopian War

Chief of General Staff
- In office 8 June 2018 – 22 June 2019
- Preceded by: General Samora Yunis
- Succeeded by: General Adem Mohammed

Se'are Mekonnen (Tigrinya: ሰዓረ መኮንን; Amharic: ሰዐረ መኮንን; 1954 – 22 June 2019) was an Ethiopian general who served as the Chief of General Staff of the Ethiopian National Defense Force from 2018 until his assassination on 22 June 2019.

== Biography ==
A veteran of the Tigray People's Liberation Front during the Ethiopian Civil War, General Se'are served as head of the Ethiopian National Defense Force (ENDF) Northern Command and the military's joint education and training department. He was appointed to the Chief of General Staff in 2018 by Prime Minister Abiy Ahmed, succeeding Samora Yunis.

Despite his partisan origins in the TPLF, Se'are was known to be an astute advocate for ethic regulation, professionalism, political neutrality of the armed forces during his tenure as Chief of General Staff, quoted in 2018 that "Ethnicity, is potent force for destruction, and must be discarded as an obstacle for building a modern army".

On 22 June 2019 while responding to a coup attempt in the Amhara region along with his aide, Major General (retired) Gizae Aberra, Se'are was killed by his bodyguard according to government sources.

The bodyguard who allegedly assassinated the general was treated for gunshot wounds he suffered at the time of the shoot-out, according to government sources.

The widow of Se'are, Colonel Tsige Alemayehu, who was present with Se'are in their private residence, and alerted the authorities at the time the shootings took place, according to her interviews conducted by BBC and the local media OMN, dispute that despite her continuous efforts and failed attempts to reach out to the prosecutor and the Attorney General office to cooperate and testify against the suspect in the trial. She claimed she has yet to be called as a government witness. She also pledged the local and international community to support her quest for a fair trial and justice Se'are.

The bodyguard on trial, Mesfin Tigabu, was convicted and sentenced to life imprisonment in June 2021.

Military offices
Preceded by Samora Yunis	Chief of General Staff; 2018–2019	Succeeded by Adem Mohammed
