= Military ranks of Ethiopia =

The military ranks of Ethiopia are the military insignia used by the Ethiopian National Defense Force (ENDF). While Ethiopia is a landlocked country, it is in the process of reestablishing a Blue-water navy. On 8 January 2022, the rank of field marshal general was awarded for the first time to Birhanu Jula. At the same time, new ranks were introduced to the ENDF.

== Commissioned officer ranks ==
The rank insignia of commissioned officers.

Rank group	General / flag officers					Senior officers			Junior officers
Ethiopian Army
Ethiopian Army	የፊልድ ማርሻል ጄኔራል; Yefīlidi marishali jēnērali	ጄነራል; Jēnerali	ሌተናል ጄነራል; Lētenali jēnerali	ሜጀር ጄነራል; Mējeri jēnerali	ብርጋዴር ጄነራል; Birigadēri jēnerali	ኮሎኔል; Kolonēli	ሌተናንት ኮሎኔል; Lētenaniti kolonēli	ሻለቃ; Shalek’a	ሻምበል; Shamibeli	የመቶ ዓለቃ; Yemeto ‘alek’a	ምክትል የመቶ ዓለቃ; Mikitili yemeto ‘alek’a
Ethiopian Navy
Ethiopian Navy		አድሚራል; Ādimīrali	ቫይስ አድሚራል; Vayisi ādimīrali	ሬር አድሚራል; Rēri ādimīrali	ኮሞዶር; Komodori	ካፒቴን; Kapītēni	ኮማንደር; Komanideri	ሌፍተናንት ኮማንደር; Lēfitenaniti komanideri	ሌፍተናንት; Lēfitenaniti	ሌፍተናንት ጁኒየር ግሬድ; Lēfitenaniti junīyeri girēdi	ሰብ ሌፍተናንት; Sebi lēfitenaniti
Ethiopian Air Force
Ethiopian Air Force		ጄነራል; Jēnerali	ሌተናል ጄነራል; Lētenali jēnerali	ሜጀር ጄነራል; Mējeri jēnerali	ብርጋዴር ጄነራል; Birigadēri jēnerali	ኮሎኔል; Kolonēli	ሌተናንት ኮሎኔል; Lētenaniti kolonēli	ሻለቃ; Shalek’a	ሻምበል; Shamibeli	የመቶ ዓለቃ; Yemeto ‘alek’a	ምክትል የመቶ ዓለቃ; Mikitili yemeto ‘alek’a
Rank group	General / flag officers					Senior officers			Junior officers

== Other ranks ==
The rank insignia of non-commissioned officers and enlisted personnel.

Rank group	Senior NCOs						Junior NCOs			Enlisted
Ethiopian Army												No insignia
Ethiopian Army			ሻለቃ ባሻ; Shalek’a basha	ሻለቃ መጋቢ ባሻ; Shalek’a megabī basha	ሻምበል ባሻ; Shamibeli basha	መጋቢ ሀምሳ ዓለቃ; Megabī hāmisa ‘alek’a	ሀምሳ ዓለቃ; Hāmisa ‘alek’a		አስር ዓለቃ; Āsiri ‘alek’a	ምክትል አስር ዓለቃ; Mikitili āsiri ‘alek’a		መሠረታዊ ወታዯር; Mešeretawī wetaderi
Ethiopian Navy
Ethiopian Navy	ቺፍ ዋረንት ኦፊሰር; Chīfi wareniti ofīseri	ማስተር ቺፍ; Masiteri chīfi	ሲኒየር ቺፍ; Sīnīyeri chīfi	ቺፍ; Chīfi	ፒቲ ኦፊሰር 1ኛ ክላስ; Pītī ofīseri ānidenya kilasi	ፒቲ ኦፊሰር 2ኛ ክላስ; Pītī ofīseri huletenya kilasi	ፒቲ ኦፊሰር 3ኛ ክላስ; Pītī ofīseri sositenya kilasi	ፒቲ ኦፊሰር 4ኛ ክላስ; Pītī ofīseri āratenya kilasi	ሊዲንግ ሲማን; Līdīnigi sīmani	ኤብል ሲማን; Ēbili sīmani	ኦርድናሪ ሲማን; Oridinarī sīmani	ሲማን ሪኩሩት; Sīmani rīkuruti
Ethiopian Air Force												No insignia
Ethiopian Air Force	ሲ ዋራንት ኦፊሰር; Sī waraniti ofīseri	ጁኝር ዋራንት ኦፊሰር; Junyiri waraniti ofīseri	ሻለቃ ባሻ; Shalek’a basha	ሻለቃ መጋቢ ባሻ; Shalek’a megabī basha	ሻምበል ባሻ; Shamibeli basha	መጋቢ ሃምሳ አለቃ; Megabī hamisa ālek’a	ሃምሳ አለቃ; Hamisa ālek’a		አስር አለቃ; Āsiri ālek’a	ምክትል አስር አለቃ; Mikitili āsiri ālek’a		መሠረታዊ ወታዯር; Mešeretawī wetaderi
Rank group	Senior NCOs						Junior NCOs			Enlisted

== Historic ranks ==
=== Commissioned officer ranks ===
The rank insignia of commissioned officers.

Rank group	General / flag officers				Senior officers			Junior officers
Ethiopian Army (–2022)
Ethiopian Army (–2022)	ጄነራል; Jēnerali	ሌተናንት ጄነራል; Lētenaniti jēnerali	ሜጄር ጄነራል; Mējēri jēnerali	ብርጋዴር ጄነራል; Birigadēri jēnerali	ኮሌኔል; Kolēnēli	ሌተናንት ኮሎኔል; Lētenaniti kolonēli	ሻለቃ; Shalek’a	ሻምበል; Shamibeli	መቶ አለቃ; Meto ālek’a	ምክትል መቶ አለቃ; Mikitili meto ālek’a
Ethiopian Army (–2022)	General	Lieutenant general	Major general	Brigadier general	Colonel	Lieutenant colonel	Major	Captain	Lieutenant	Second lieutenant
Ethiopian Air Force (–2022)
Ethiopian Air Force (–2022)	ጄኔራል; Jēnērali	ሌተናንት ጄኔራል; Lētenaniti jēnērali	ሜጄር ጄኔራል; Mējēri jēnērali	ብርጋዴር ጄኔራል; Birigadēri jēnērali	ኮሌኔል; Kolēnēli	ሌተናንት ኮሎኔል; Lētenaniti kolonēli	ሻለቃ; Shalek’a	ሻምበል; Shamibeli	መቶ አለቃ; Meto ālek’a	ምክትል መቶ አለቃ; Mikitili meto ālek’a
Ethiopian Air Force (–2022)	General	Lieutenant general	Major general	Brigadier general	Colonel	Lieutenant colonel	Major	Captain	Lieutenant	Second lieutenant
Rank group	General / flag officers				Senior officers			Junior officers

=== Other ranks ===
The rank insignia of non-commissioned officers and enlisted personnel.

Rank group	Senior NCOs						Junior NCOs		Enlisted
Ethiopian Army (–2022)										No insignia
Ethiopian Army (–2022)	ሲ ዋራንት ኦፊሰር; Sī waraniti ofīseri	ጁኝር ዋራንት ኦፊሰር; Junyiri waraniti ofīseri	ሻለቃ ባሻ; Shalek’a basha	ሻለቃ መጋቢ ባሻ; Shalek’a megabī basha	ሻምበል ባሻ; Shamibeli basha	መጋቢ ሃምሳ አለቃ; Megabī hamisa ālek’a	ሃምሳ አለቃ; Hamisa ālek’a	አስር አለቃ; Āsiri ālek’a	ምክትል አስር አለቃ; Mikitili āsiri ālek’a
Ethiopian Army (–2022)	Senior warrant officer	Junior warrant officer	Command sergeant major	Staff sergeant major	First sergeant	Master sergeant	Sergeant	Corporal	Lance corporal	Private
Ethiopian Air Force (–2022)										No insignia
Ethiopian Air Force (–2022)	ሲ ዋራንት ኦፊሰር; Sī waraniti ofīseri	ጁኝር ዋራንት ኦፊሰር; Junyiri waraniti ofīseri	ሻለቃ ባሻ; Shalek’a basha	ሻለቃ መጋቢ ባሻ; Shalek’a megabī basha	ሻምበል ባሻ; Shamibeli basha	መጋቢ ሃምሳ አለቃ; Megabī hamisa ālek’a	ሃምሳ አለቃ; Hamisa ālek’a	አስር አለቃ; Āsiri ālek’a	ምክትል አስር አለቃ; Mikitili āsiri ālek’a
Ethiopian Air Force (–2022)	Senior warrant officer	Junior warrant officer	Command sergeant major	Staff sergeant major	First sergeant	Master sergeant	Sergeant	Corporal	Lance corporal	Private
