= Chief of General Staff (Ethiopia) =

Head Commander of the Ethiopian National Defense Force

Chief of the General Staff
- የኢትዮጵያ ጦር ኃይሎች ጠቅላይ ሹም (Amharic)

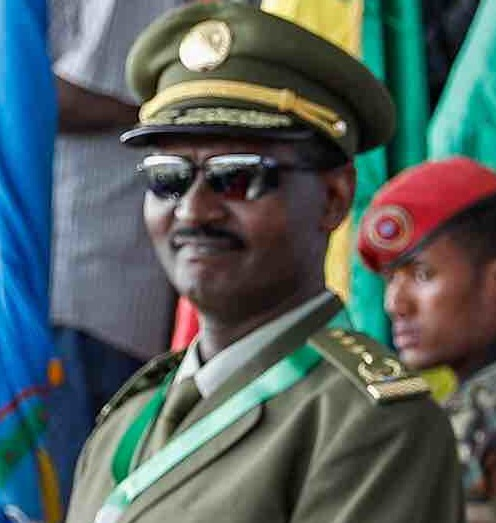
- Incumbent; Field marshal general Birhanu Jula since 4 November 2020
- Ethiopian National Defense force
- Abbreviation: CGS
- Member of: Ethiopian National Defense Force; National Security Council
- Reports to: Minister of Defence
- Seat: Ethiopian National Defense Force Head Quarter
- Appointer: Prime Minister
- Formation: 1941; 85 years ago

The Chief of General Staff (Amharic: የኢትዮጵያ ጦር ኃይሎች ጠቅላይ ሹም, romanized: Ye’ītiyop’iya t’ori ḫayilochi t’ek’ilayi shumi) Abbreviated (CGS Ethiopia) is the professional head of the Ethiopian National Defense Force. The CDF also oversees all branches of the military Army, Air Force, and Navy. The CGF is typically linked to national defense and military strategy. The chief is responsible for the administration and the operational control of the Ethiopian military.

The current Chief of General Staff is Field marshal Birhanu Jula who was appointed by Prime Minister Abiy Ahmed on 4 November 2020 succeeding General Adem Mohammed. and the current deputy Chief of the General Staff is General Abebaw Tadese who was appointed by Prime Minister succeeding Field Marshal Birhanu Jula

== General Requirement ==
Ethiopia puts this requirement for the position.

1. Military Rank and Experience: The individual must be a senior officer, usually holding the rank of Major General, Lieutenant General and General before being considered for the position. They should have served in various high-ranking military positions and demonstrated effective leadership and strategic capabilities.

2. Training and Education: A graduate of a military academy or officer training school is typically required. For the ENDF, this would most likely involve training at the Ethiopian Military Academy or similar institutions. Advanced military education, such as courses at top military institutions (e.g., Ethiopian National Defense College or international military academies), would also be beneficial.

3. Proven Leadership and Service Record: A record of leadership and performance in combat or military operations. This includes experience in various military branches, such as infantry, artillery, or intelligence. Serving in significant roles during military operations and demonstrating success in managing and executing defense strategies.

4. Political and Administrative Understanding: The Chief of the General Staff is not only a military leader but also often plays a significant role in national security and policy decisions. Understanding the political environment and having strong relationships with political leaders is important.

5. Physical Fitness and Health: Military leaders are expected to maintain high physical fitness levels, so meeting the physical standards for military service would be necessary.

6. Trust and Loyalty: As the head of the ENDF, the Chief of the General Staff must have the trust of the government, the Prime Minister, and other senior officials. Political alignment and loyalty to the ruling government can play a role in appointments to such a prestigious and powerful position.

7. Leadership in National Defense Strategy: The individual must be capable of shaping the country's defense strategy, ensuring the country's military is prepared for any national security threats, and leading the military in defense of the nation's interests.

== Time Span ==
The term of a CGS is not fixed but generally lasts several years. In Ethiopia, the term can be influenced by political decisions, changes in government, and performance within the military. The length of the term can vary, but on average, a CGS might serve between 5 and 7 years before a change occurs, either due to retirement, reshuffling, or other political reasons.

== Appointment ==
Prime Minister of Ethiopia typically appoints the Chief of the Defense Force and Deputy Chief of the Defense Force, often after consulting with other high-ranking military. The appointment may also involve review and recommendations by senior military leadership.

== List of chiefs ==
=== Ethiopian Empire (1941–1974) ===
No.	Portrait	Chief of Staff	Took office	Left office	Time in office	Defence branch	Ref.
?	Mulugeta Buli	Major general Mulugeta Buli (1917–1960)	November 1956	1958	1–2 years	Imperial Army	
?		Lieutenant General; Eyasu Mengesha				Imperial Army	
?		Lieutenant General; Haile Baykedagen				Imperial Army	
?		Lieutenant General; Assefa Ayane				Imperial Air Force	
?		Lieutenant General; Wolde Selassie Bereka		3 July 1974		Imperial Army	
?	Aman Andom	Lieutenant General; Aman Andom (1924–1974)	3 July 1974	12 September 1974	66 days	Imperial Army	

=== Derg (1974–1987) ===
No.	Portrait	Chief of Staff	Took office	Left office	Time in office	Defence branch	Ref.
1	Aman Andom	Lieutenant General; Aman Andom (1924–1974)	12 September 1974	17 November 1978 †	66 days	Army	
2	Moges Haile	Lieutenant General; Moges Haile	1976	1980	4–5 years	Air force	
3	Merid Negussie	Major General; Merid Negussie (1924–1974)	1980	January 1981	0–1 years	Kebur Zabagna	
?	Addis Tedla	Lieutenant General; Addis Tedla	1972	?	1980	Air force	

=== People's Democratic Republic (1987–1991) ===
No.	Portrait	Chief of Staff	Took office	Left office	Time in office	Defence branch	Ref.
1	Merid Negussie	Major General; Merid Negussie (1934–1989)	22 February 1987	18 May 1989 ‡‡	2 years, 85 days	Kebur Zabagna	
2	Addis Tedla	Lieutenant general Addis Tedla	26 May 1989	28 May 1991	2 years, 2 days	Air force	

=== Federal Democratic Republic (1991–present) ===
No.	Portrait	Chief of Staff	Took office	Left office	Time in office	Ref.
1	Tsadkan Gebretensae	Lieutenant general Tsadkan Gebretensae	28 May 1991	2001	9–10 years	
2	Samora Yunis	General; Samora Yunis (born c. 1949)	2001	7 June 2018	16–17 years	
3	Seare Mekonen	General; Seare Mekonen (1954–2019)	7 June 2018	22 June 2019 X	1 year, 15 days	
4	Adem Mohammed	General; Adem Mohammed	27 June 2019	4 November 2020	1 year, 130 days	
5	Birhanu Jula	Field Marshal General; Birhanu Jula (born 1965)	4 November 2020	Incumbent	5 years, 322 days	
