= Birhanu Jula =

Ethiopian military officer (born 1965)

Field Marshal Birhanu Jula
- Birhaanuu Julaa Galaalchaa
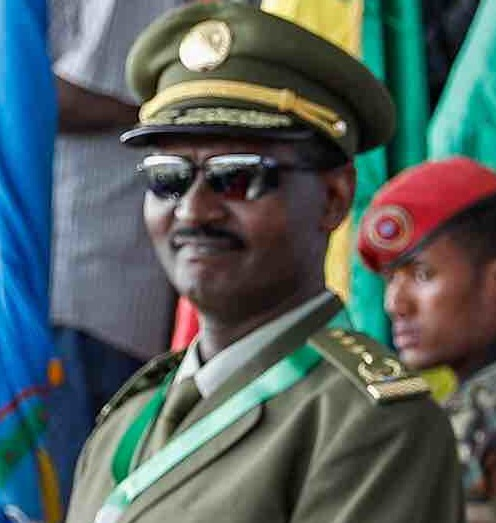
- Birhanu in 2019

Chief of General Staff
- Incumbent
- Assumed office 12 November 2020
- President: Sahle-Work Zewde; Taye Atske Selassie
- Prime Minister: Abiy Ahmed
- Deputy: General Abebaw Tadesse
- Preceded by: General Adem Mohammed

Force Commander, United Nations Interim Security Force for Abyei
- In office 21 November 2014 – 15 January 2016
- Appointed by: Ban Ki-moon
- Preceded by: Yohannes Gebremeskel Tesfamariam
- Succeeded by: Hassen Ebrahim Mussa

Personal details
- Born: Kuyera Shashamane
- Children: 3

Military service
- Allegiance: Ethiopia
- Branch/service: Ethiopian Army
- Rank: Field Marshal
- Battles/wars: Ethiopian Civil War; Eritrean–Ethiopian War; Tigray War; Fano insurgency Ethiopia-TPLF clashes

Birhanu Jula Gelalcha (Amharic: ብርሃኑ ጁላ, born 1965) is an Ethiopian military officer who is the current Chief of General Staff of the Ethiopian National Defense Force since 4 November 2020. He served as the Force Commander of the United Nations Interim Security Force for Abyei (UNISFA) from 2014 to 2016.

== Biography ==
Birhanu holds a bachelor's degree from Alpha University College and a master's degree from Greenwich University, both in Addis Ababa. In 2006, Birhanu worked with the UN Mission in Liberia and held the position of Sector Commander. He has also held various other positions with the army including with the Ministry of National Defence, the Cadet School and Brigade Operations. From 2006 to 2009, he was the army's Deputy Commander of the Central Command. In 2010, Birhanu was appointed Commander of the Western Command in the Ethiopian Army.

Birhanu was appointed as Force Commander of UNISFA on 21 November 2014 by United Nations Secretary-General Ban Ki-moon. At the time, he was a major general. He was promoted to lieutenant general sometime before 9 December 2015. His term ended on 15 January 2016 with the appointment of Major General Hassen Ebrahim Mussa.

Field Marshal Birhanu Jula, Chief of Staff of the Ethiopian Armed Forces, dated 05 April 2023

On 8 January 2022, Birhanu was promoted to Field Marshal (or "Field Marshal General", the rank varies among sources) by prime minister Abiy Ahmed and president Sahle-Work Zewde. He is awarded the Blacklion High Heroes Medal.

Military offices
Preceded by Adem Mohammed	Chief of General Staff; 2020–present
