= Amhara Region coup attempt =

2019 assassinations and attempted coup in Ethiopia

2019 Amhara Region coup d'état attempt
- Part of the Ethiopian civil conflict (2018–present)
- Amhara Region coup attempt (Ethiopia)
Date	22 June 2019
Location	Bahir Dar, Amhara Region, Ethiopia; Addis Ababa, Ethiopia
Result	Coup attempt failed: Amhara Regional President Ambachew Mekonnen and Chief of General Staff Se'are Mekonnen are killed

Belligerents
Factions of the Amhara Region's Peace and Security Bureau	Government of Amhara Region; Government of Ethiopia

Commanders and leaders
Asaminew Tsige †	Ambachew Mekonnen †; Abiy Ahmed; Lemma Megersa; Se'are Mekonnen †; Gizae Aberra †

Casualties and losses
- "Dozens" of fatalities

The 2019 Amhara Region coup d'état attempt was an attempted coup d'état against the Amhara Regional government on 22 June 2019, during which factions of the Amhara Region's Peace and Security Bureau assassinated the Amhara Regional President Ambachew Mekonnen. A bodyguard siding with the nationalist factions also assassinated General Se'are Mekonnen, the Chief of General Staff of the Ethiopian National Defense Force, as well as his aide Major General Gizae Aberra.

The prime minister's office accused Brigadier General Asaminew Tsige, head of the Amhara Region's Peace and Security Bureau, of leading the plot. Asaminew was later shot dead after escaping.

== Background ==
Historically Ethiopia has experienced ethnic conflicts, and the government established a system of ethnic federalism under the 1995 Constitution of Ethiopia, establishing the Amhara Region as a subnational region where the population is predominantly made up of the Amhara people. The traditional districts of Wolkait and Raya Azebo had been part of the provinces of Begemder and Wollo respectively, but they were joined to the Tigray Region.

The Ethiopian People's Revolutionary Democratic Front (EPRDF) and the Amhara National Democratic Movement (ANDM) had been accused of "disciplining the Amhara people instead of representing them". Despite these grievances, Amhara ethnic nationalism remained a minor force during the first two decades of the EPRDF-led order. Amhara political elites continued to place their stock in multi-cultural pan-Ethiopian nationalism and largely rejected ethnic self-identification in favour of a purely Ethiopian multi-ethnic national identity. Accordingly, the region voted overwhelmingly for the Coalition for Unity and Democracy and United Ethiopian Democratic Forces opposition alliances in the 2005 general elections, which had run on decisively pan-Ethiopian multicultural platforms.

Abiy Ahmed's rise to power encouraged the belief that the Tigray People's Liberation Front (TPLF) was in decline and motivated Amhara nationalists to push for the return of the "lost" regions in the Tigray. This was strongly resisted under the leadership of Debretsion Gebremichael.

In March 2019, Amhara Regional President Gedu Andargachew resigned for unstated reasons, but warned of the rising danger of "narrow nationalism" that he claimed were increasing tensions between Amharas and Tigrayans in his farewell speech. Ambachew Mekonnen replaced him and appointed retired general and former political prisoner Asaminew Tsige as head of the regional security forces. Asaminew delivered an "incendiary" speech in June 2019 at the graduation of members of the security forces, reportedly full of Amhara nationalist invective.

== Events ==
Early in the evening of 22 June 2019, witnesses claimed to have seen and heard explosions at the Regional Police Commission headquarters, the office of the regional legislature, and office of the president in Bahir Dar. Shortly after, observers—including the United States Embassy reported gunfire in Addis Ababa. The prime minister's office said that a "hit squad" reporting to Brigadier General Asaminew, had burst into a meeting of the regional cabinet in Bahir Dar and opened fire. According to Reuters, the meeting's agenda concerned Asaminew's attempts to openly recruit ethnic militias.

In a statement shortly after midnight on 23 June, Prime Minister Abiy Ahmed announced that General Se'are Mekonnen, Chief of Staff of the Ethiopian National Defense Force, had been attacked by "people in his close entourage" who had been "bought by hired elements". The next morning, Radio Dimtsi Weyane reported that Se'are and his aide Major General Gizae Aberra had died from their wounds. The Amhara Mass Media Agency likewise reported that the Amhara Regional President Ambachew had been killed along with adviser Ezez Wassie. The Amhara Region Attorney General Megbaru Kebede was also seriously injured and died on 24 June.

Asaminew remained at large for 36 hours after the attempt. State media confirmed that he was shot dead by police near Bahir Dar on 24 June, while several of his alleged co-conspirators had been detained.

Conflicting details regarding the bodyguard who assassinated General Se'are Mekonnen were given from the federal government. Initial reports indicated that the suspect was arrested. However, on 24 June 2019, police said the suspect had committed suicide in order to avoid arrest.

== Aftermath ==
Following the coup attempt, internet access was shut down nationwide. Ethiopia remained offline two days later with no official explanation. Prime Minister Abiy called for unity against the "forces of evil" and flags flew at half-mast on 24 June as the government declared a national day of mourning. The United States Embassy advised people to shelter in place, and a wide range of international leaders condemned the coup attempt.

== See also ==
- 2024 Amhara offensive
- Coup belt
