= Ethiopian Army =

Land service branch of the Ethiopian National Defense Force

- የኢትዮጵያ ሰራዊት
- Founded: 26 October 1907 (119 years)
- Country: Ethiopia
- Type: Army
- Role: Ground warfare
- Part of: Ethiopian National Defense Force
- Engagements: Gugsa Wale's rebellion; Second Italo-Ethiopian War; World War II; Korean War; United Nations Operation in the Congo; Eritrean War of Independence; 1964 Ethiopian–Somali Border War; Nigerian Civil War; Ethiopian Civil War; Rhodesian Bush War; Ogaden War; 1982 Ethiopian–Somali Border War; United Nations Assistance Mission for Rwanda; Eritrean–Ethiopian War; Somalia War (2006–2009); 2007–2008 Ethiopian crackdown in Ogaden; OLA insurgency; Tigray War; 2022 al-Shabaab invasion of Ethiopia; Fano insurgency; Tigray clashes (January–February 2026); 2026 Ethiopian offensive

Commanders
- Commander-in-chief: President Taye Atske Selassie
- Chief of General Staff: Field Marshal General Birhanu Jula
- Deputy Chief of General Staff: General Abebaw Tadesse
- Notable commanders: Gen Getachew Gudina; Gen Alemeshet Degefe; Lt.Gen. Yohanes G/meskel; Lt.Gen. Solomon Etefa; Lt.Gen. Belay Seyoum; Lt.Gen. Zewdu Belay; Lt.Gen. Shuma Abdeta; Lt.Gen. Mohammed Tesema; Lt.Gen. Hachalu Sheleme; Lt.Gen. Mesele Meseret; Maj. Gen Endalcachew w/Kidan; Maj. Gen Tesfaye Ayalew; Maj. Gen Adamneh Mengiste; Maj. Gen Mulualem Admasu; Maj. Gen Berhanu Bekele; Brig.Gen. Shambel Beyene (Bale Kezeraw); Brig.Gen. Marye Beyene

The Ethiopian Army (Amharic: የኢትዮጵያ ሰራዊት, romanized: Ye-Ītyōṗṗyā serawīt) is the land service branch of the Ethiopian National Defense Force. It is the senior of the three uniformed military branches. The force engages in land warfare and combined arms operations, including armored and mechanized operations as well as air assault operations.

== History ==
=== 1990–1991 order of battle ===
Gebru Tareke listed the Ethiopian Army in 1990 as comprising four revolutionary armies organized as task forces, eleven corps, twenty-four infantry divisions, and four mountain divisions, reinforced by five mechanized divisions, two airborne divisions, and ninety-five brigades, including four mechanized brigades, three artillery brigades, four tank brigades, twelve special commandos and para commandos brigades – including the Spartakiad, which became operational in 1987 under the preparation and guidance of North Koreans – seven BM-rocket battalions, and ten brigades of paramilitary forces.

Forces underarms were estimated at 230,000 in early 1991. Mengistu's People's Militia had also grown to about 200,000 members. The mechanized forces of the army comprised 1,200 T-54/55, 100 T-62 tanks, and 1,100 armored personnel carriers (APCs), but readiness was estimated to be only about 30 percent operational, because of the withdrawal of financial support, lack of maintenance expertise and parts from the Soviet Union, Cuba, and other nations.

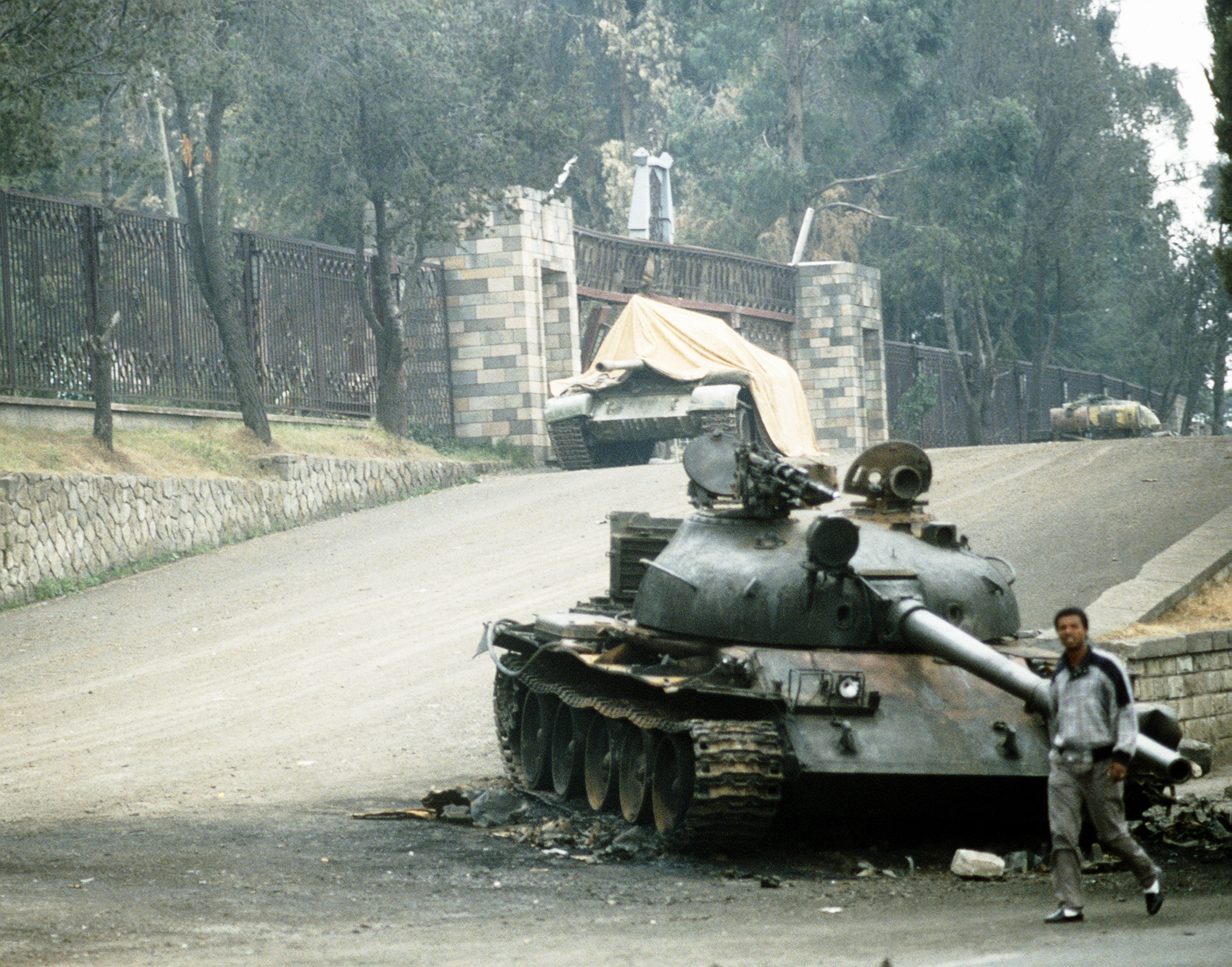
Ethiopian T-62 tanks at the end of the Ethiopian Civil War.

The army commands consisted of the:

- First Revolutionary Army (headquartered at Harar, 1988: 601st and 602nd Corps)
- Second Revolutionary Army (headquartered at Asmera, 1988: 606th-610th Corps)
- Third Revolutionary Army (headquartered at Kombolcha, 1988: 603rd, 604th, 605th Corps)
- Fourth Revolutionary Army (headquartered at Nekemte, 1988: 611th, 612th, 614th Corps)
- Fifth Revolutionary Army (headquartered at Gondar)

To these armies were assigned the operational forces of the army, comprising:

- 31 infantry divisions. The 30th and 31st Infantry Divisions were the last formed, circa November–December 1989. There were also the 102nd Airborne Division and 103rd Commando Divisions, which began training in January 1987.
- 32 tank battalions
- 40 artillery battalions
- 12 air defense battalions
- 8 commando brigades

=== Twenty-first century structure ===
The International Institute for Strategic Studies estimated in the Military Balance 2009 that the army comprised 4 Military Regional Commands; (Northern (HQ Mekele.), Western, Central, and Eastern) each acting as corps HQ, there also being a Support Command and a strategic reserve of four divisions and six specialist brigades centred on Addis Ababa.

Each of the four corps comprises a headquarters, an estimated one mechanised division and between 4 and 6 infantry divisions.

In 2014 the regional commanders were listed by dissident sources as:

- Central Command, Major General Yohannes Woldegiorgis
- Northern Command, Major General Gebrat Ayele
- Western Command, Major General Birhanu Julla
- Eastern Command, Major General Abraha Woldemariam

The modern ENDF has a wide mix of equipment. Many of its major weapons systems stem from the Communist era and are of Soviet and Eastern bloc design. The United States was Ethiopia's major arms supplier from the end of the Second World War until 1977, when Ethiopia began receiving massive arms shipments from the Soviet Union. These shipments, including armored patrol boats, transport and jet fighter aircraft, helicopters, tanks, trucks, missiles, artillery, and small arms have incurred an unserviced Ethiopian debt to the former Soviet Union estimated at more than $3.5 billion.

Ethiopia made significant purchases of arms from Russia in late 1999 and early 2000 before the May 2000 United Nations arms embargo went into effect. It is likely that much of that equipment suffered battle damage in the war with Eritrea. Thus, raw numbers alone will probably overstate the capacity of the ENDF.

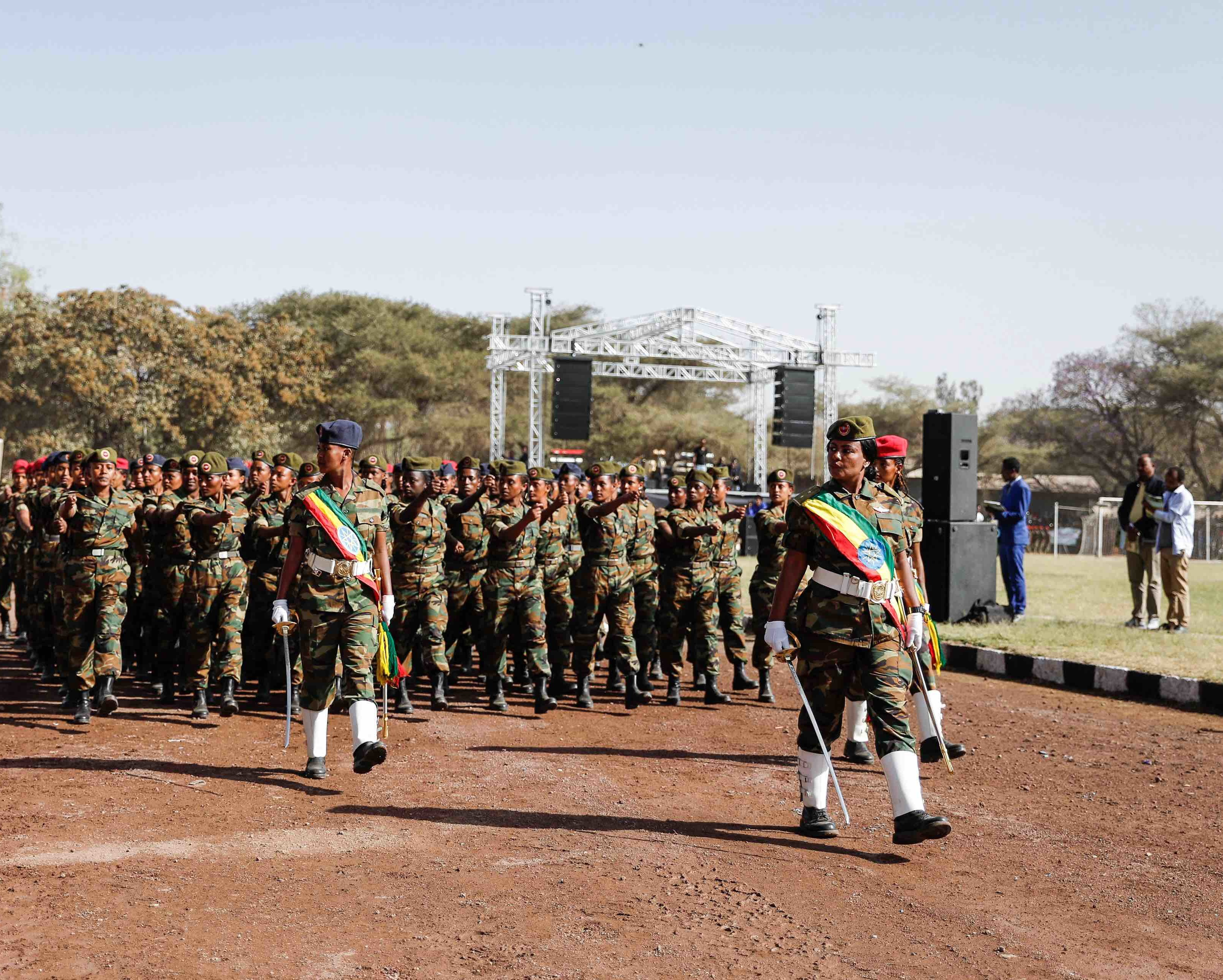
Ethiopian Army soldiers marching in a military parade 2019.

== United Nations peacekeeping ==
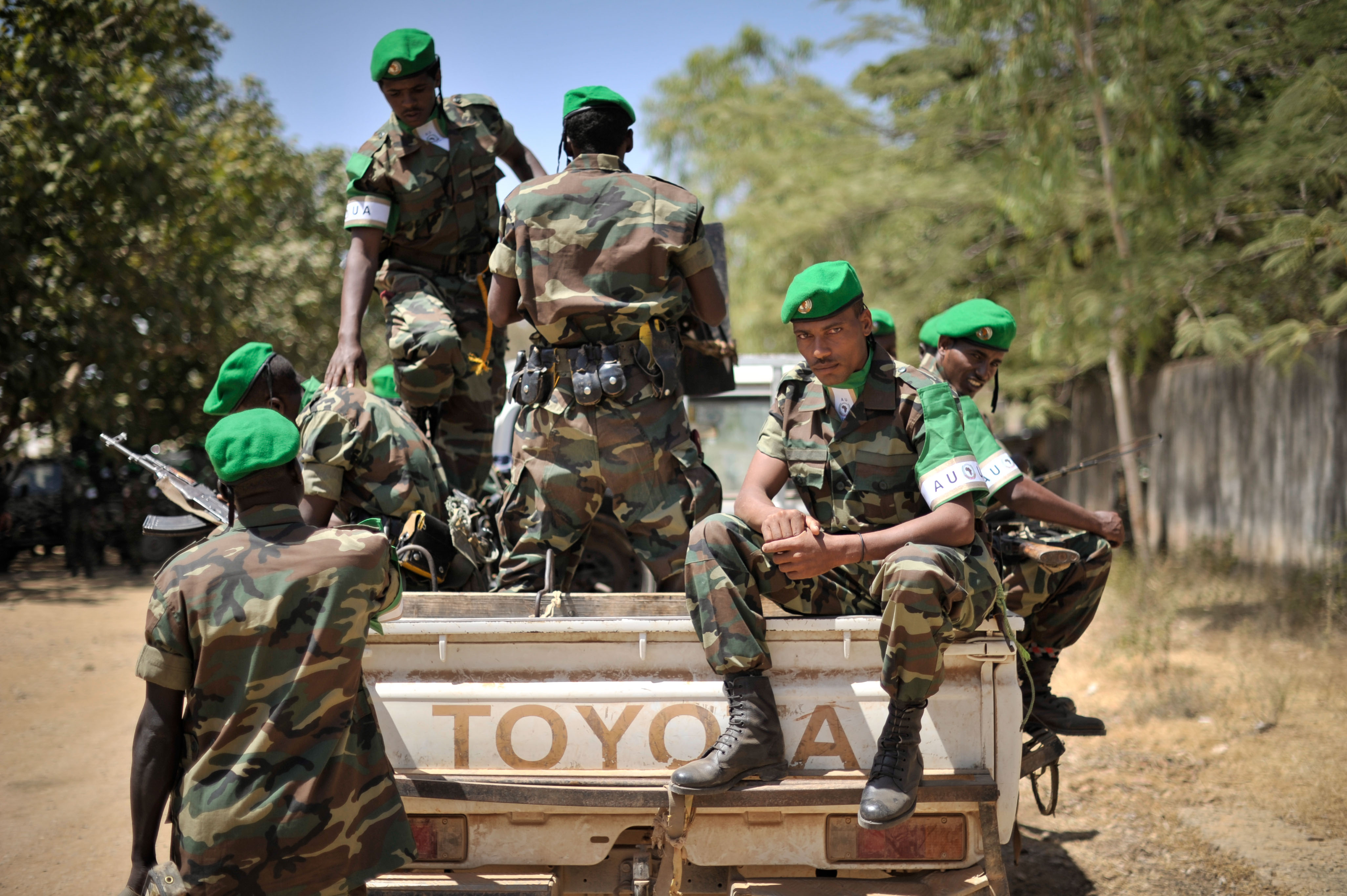
Ethiopian Army soldiers at a ceremony marking Ethiopia joining AMISOM in Somalia.

Ethiopia has served in various United Nations and African Union peacekeeping missions. These have included Ivory Coast, on the Burundi border, and in Rwanda.

Two major previous Ethiopian missions were in Liberia and Darfur. The United Nations Mission in Liberia (UNMIL) was established by United Nations Security Council Resolution 1509, of 19 September 2003, to support the implementation of the ceasefire agreement and the peace process, protect United Nations staff, facilities and civilians, support humanitarian and human rights activities; as well as assist in national security reform, including national police training and formation of a new, restructured military. In November 2007, nearly 1,800 Ethiopian troops serving with the United Nations Mission in Liberia (UNMIL) were presented with UN service medals for their "invaluable contribution to the peace process." Up to three Ethiopian battalions used to constitute Sector 4 of the UN Mission, covering the southern part of the country. The mission ended in 2018.

Many thousands of Ethiopian peacekeepers were also involved in the hybrid United Nations–African Union Mission in Darfur (UNAMID) in western Sudan. The Security Council authorized a force of about 26,000 uniformed personnel. The Darfur mission was shut down in 2020–21.

Ethiopia also provided the entire force for the UN's Abyei mission, the United Nations Interim Security Force for Abyei, up until 2021. An Ethiopian officer commanded the force.

Many thousands of Ethiopian Army personnel were also part of the African Union Mission in Somalia.

== Personnel ==
=== Military ranks ===
Commissioned officer ranks

The rank insignia of commissioned officers.

Rank group	General / flag officers					Senior officers			Junior officers
Ethiopian Army
Ethiopian Army	የፊልድ ማርሻል ጄኔራል; Yefīlidi marishali jēnērali	ጄነራል; Jēnerali	ሌተናል ጄነራል; Lētenali jēnerali	ሜጀር ጄነራል; Mējeri jēnerali	ብርጋዴር ጄነራል; Birigadēri jēnerali	ኮሎኔል; Kolonēli	ሌተናንት ኮሎኔል; Lētenaniti kolonēli	ሻለቃ; Shalek’a	ሻምበል; Shamibeli	የመቶ ዓለቃ; Yemeto ‘alek’a	ምክትል የመቶ ዓለቃ; Mikitili yemeto ‘alek’a

Other ranks

The rank insignia of non-commissioned officers and enlisted personnel.

Rank group	Senior NCOs				Junior NCOs		Enlisted
Ethiopian Army								No insignia
Ethiopian Army	ሻለቃ ባሻ; Shalek’a basha	ሻለቃ መጋቢ ባሻ; Shalek’a megabī basha	ሻምበል ባሻ; Shamibeli basha	መጋቢ ሀምሳ ዓለቃ; Megabī hāmisa ‘alek’a	ሀምሳ ዓለቃ; Hāmisa ‘alek’a	አስር ዓለቃ; Āsiri ‘alek’a	ምክትል አስር ዓለቃ; Mikitili āsiri ‘alek’a	መሠረታዊ ወታዯር; Mešeretawī wetaderi

== Equipment ==
The Military Balance 2012 estimated that about 450 BRDM, BMP-1, BTR-60, BTR-152, and Type 89 armoured fighting vehicles and armoured personnel carriers were in service.

A total of 150 T-55 - 90 from Soviet Union, +40 from Belarus, +19 from Bulgaria, +50 from East Germany, +90 from Ukraine, and 150 T-54 (60 from East Germany) may have been in service over the years. Up to 150 M113 armoured personnel carriers may have been delivered from the United States.

16 M55 Quad quadruple anti-aircraft machine guns may have been in service from the United States. M163 VADS self-propelled anti-aircraft guns may have been ordered but never delivered.
