= Jido =

District in Oromia Region, Ethiopia

Jido is a woreda in Oromia Region, Ethiopia. It was part of former Wuchalena Jido woreda. Part of the Kaba Shewa Zone, Jido is bordered on the north west by Wuchale, on the north by Amhara Region, on the north east by Abichu, on the east by Kembibit and on the south by Bereh and Aleltu.

== Demographics ==
The 2007 national census reported a total population for this woreda of 53,658, of whom 26,889 were men and 26,769 were women; none of its population were urban dwellers. The majority of the inhabitants said they practised Ethiopian Orthodox Christianity, with 97.58% of the population reporting they practised that belief, and 1.6% were Muslim.
