= Ambachew Mekonnen =

Ethiopian politician and economist (c.1971–2019)

- አምባቸው መኮንን

Chief Administrator of Amhara Region
- In office 8 March 2019 – 22 June 2019
- Prime Minister: Abiy Ahmed
- Preceded by: Gedu Andargachew
- Succeeded by: Temesgen Tiruneh

Minister of Trade and Industry
- In office 19 April 2018 – 22 October 2018
- Prime Minister: Abiy Ahmed
- Preceded by: Gedu Andargachew
- Succeeded by: Fetlework Gebregziabher

Minister of Housing and Urban Development
- In office 1 November 2016 – 19 April 2018
- Prime Minister: Hailemariam Dessalegn; Abiy Ahmed
- Preceded by: Mekuria Haile
- Succeeded by: Jantirar Abay

Minister of Construction
- In office 6 October 2015 – 1 November 2016
- Prime Minister: Hailemariam Dessalegn
- Preceded by: Mekuria Haile

Personal details
- Born: c. 1971 Aketo, Gayint, Begemder Province, Ethiopian Empire (now Debub Gondar Zone, Ethiopia)
- Died: 22 June 2019 (aged 47–48) Bahir Dar, Amhara Region, Ethiopia
- Cause of death: Assassination by gunshots
- Party: Amhara Democratic Party
- Other political affiliations: Ethiopian People's Revolutionary Democratic Front
- Education: Ethiopian Civil Service University (BA); KDI School of Public Policy and Management (MPP); University of Kent (MSc, PhD)

Ambachew Mekonnen (Ge'ez: አምባቸው መኮንን; c. 1971 – 22 June 2019) was an Ethiopian politician and economist who served as the president of the Amhara Region of Ethiopia from March 2019 until his assassination in a coup attempt on June 22, 2019.

== Life ==
Ambachew Mekonnen was born in Tach Gayint, South Gondar, to a family of farmers. His secondary education was interrupted due to the Ethiopian Civil War, when his school was closed, and he joined the Ethiopian People's Democratic Movement (EPDM, later ANDM) as a guerrilla in 1990. He completed his secondary studies via distance education and was appointed an administrator in Abichuna Gne'a and Sheno in North Shewa.

He went on to receive a BA in economics from the Ethiopian Civil Service University, an MPP from the Korea Development Institute, and an MSc in international finance and economic development and a PhD in Economics from the University of Kent, writing his dissertation on "Economic growth, trade and investment in sub-Saharan Africa: nexus and determinants”.

Before his appointment as president of the Amhara Region, he served in various roles, including the Ministry of Housing and Urban Development, Ethiopia. He also served as an infrastructure adviser in the Prime Minister's office prior to his selection as regional President on 6 March 2019, replacing Gedu Andargachew.

== Death ==
Ambachew was shot dead on 22 June 2019 in Bahir Dar, Ethiopia, by a supposed hit squad during a coup attempt in the Amhara region. His adviser was also killed in the coup.
