= Jantirar Abay =

Ethiopian politician

- ጃንጥራር አባይ

Deputy Mayor of Addis Ababa
- Incumbent
- Assumed office 18 August 2020
- Prime Minister: Abiy Ahmed
- Preceded by: Adanech Abebe

Advisor to the Prime Minister
- In office 26 April 2019 – 18 August 2020

Minister of Urban Development and Housing
- In office 18 April 2018 – 18 April 2019
- President: Mulatu Teshome; Sahle-Work Zewde
- Prime Minister: Abiy Ahmed
- Preceded by: Ambachew Mekonnen
- Succeeded by: Aisha Mohammed

Personal details
- Born: Wollo, Amhara Region, Ethiopia
- Party: Prosperity Party
- Other political affiliations: Amhara Democratic Party
- Education: Addis Ababa University (BSc, MSc)

Jantirar Abay (Amharic: ጃንጥራር አባይ) is an Ethiopian politician who is the deputy mayor of Addis Ababa since 2020. He was the Minister of Urban Development and Housing from 2018 to 2019. On 26 April 2019, he was appointed as advisor to the Prime Minister on Infrastructure & Urban Development. On 18 April 2019, Jantirar was replaced by Aisha Mohammed as minister of Urban Development and Construction.

Previously, he had worked with several government positions such as Deputy Administrator of North Wollo Zone, Head of Amhara Road Transport and Head of Amhara Road and Transport Bureau.

== Career ==
Jantirar Abay was born in Wollo, Amhara Region. He earned BSc in Urban Planning, MSc in Architecture and Urban Designing and Development from Addis Ababa University. He served in numerous positions notably, the Deputy Administrator of North Wollo Zone, Head of Amhara Road Transport. Head of Amhara Road and Transport Bureau. On 19 April 2018, Jantirar was elected as Minister of Urban Development and Housing under newly formed Prime Minister Abiy Ahmed cabinet. On 26 April 2019, he was appointed as the Prime Minister advisor on Infrastructure & Urban Development. He was replaced by Aisha Mohammed on 18 April 2019 as minister of Urban Development and Construction.

On 18 August 2020, the Addis Ababa City Council has approved Jantirar as a coordinator of public service delivery institutions with the rank of deputy mayor while Adanech Abebe appointed as the deputy mayor of Addis Ababa.
