= Chaltu Sani =

Ethiopian politician

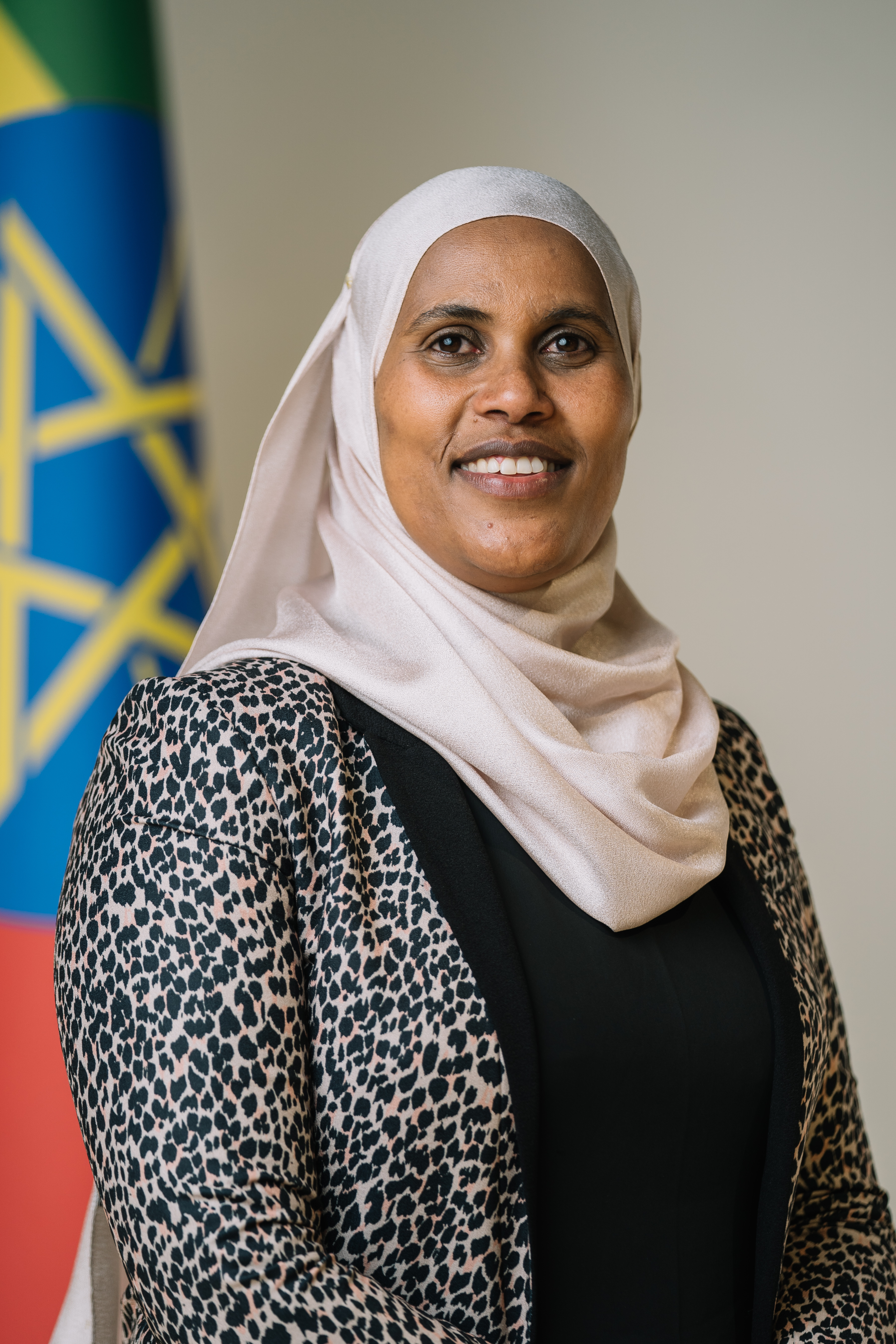

CEO of Ethiopia’s Federal Housing Corporation
- Incumbent
- Assumed office 28 September 2026
- Preceded by: Dr. Reshad Kemal

Minister of Urban and Infrastructure Development
- In office 6 October 2021 – 28 September 2026
- President: Sahle-Work Zewde; Taye Atske Selassie
- Prime Minister: Abiy Ahmed
- Preceded by: Aisha Mohammed

Deputy Chief Administrator and Economic Cluster Coordinator
- In office 30 November 2019 – 6 October 2021

Head of the Oromia Revenues Authority
- In office 18 April 2018 – 30 November 2019

Personal details
- Party: Prosperity Party
- Other political affiliations: Oromo Democratic Party

Chaltu Sani Ibrahim (Oromo: Chaaltu Saano Ibraahim) is an Ethiopian politician serving as the Minister of Urban and Infrastructure Development since 2021. Chaltu was the Deputy Chief Administrator and Economic Cluster Coordinator from 2019 and the head of the Oromia Revenues Authority from 2018.

== Political career ==
Chaltu Sani was a mayor of Legedadi-Legetafo town. On 18 April 2018, Chaltu served as head of Oromia Revenues Authority. On 30 November 2019, She was appointed as a Chief Administrator and Economic Cluster Coordinator with the rank of deputy chief administrator and while Kassahun Gofe and Fekadu Tessema were named as head of Oromia Revenues Authority and head of ODP's Party Secretarial Office. On 6 October 2021, Chaltu has been named as the Minister of Urban and Infrastructure Development, succeeding Aisha Mohammed. In September 2026, she was appointed as the CEO of Ethiopia’s Federal Housing Corporation.
