= Debebe Eshetu =

Ethiopian actor and human rights advocate (1943–2025)

- ደበበ እሸቱ
- Born: 1943; Addis Ababa, Ethiopian Empire
- Died: 17 August 2025 (aged 81–82); Addis Ababa, Ethiopia
- Resting place: Holy Trinity Cathedral, Addis Ababa
- Education: Teferi Mekonen School; Addis Ababa University; Budapest School of Dramatic Arts
- Occupations: Actor; director, journalist; human Rights activist
- Years active: 1963–2025
- Known for: Pioneering Ethiopian theatre and cinema; global cultural advocacy
- Notable work: Yalacha Gabicha, Tewodros, Guma, Shaft in Africa, The African Spy
- Spouse: Almaz Dejene (m. 1973)
- Children: 4

Debebe Eshetu (Amharic: ደበበ እሸቱ; 1943 – 17 August 2025) was an Ethiopian actor, journalist and human rights advocate.

== Life and work ==
Debebe Eshete was born in 1943 in Addis Ababa. In 1962, he introduced pantomime art and became the head of the theatre training department at the Ethiopian National Theatre. He trained at the Budapest School in Hungary and his stage debut was in Yalacha Gabicha (Marriage of Unequals) in 1963.

Debebe appeared in the 1973 American blaxploitation film Shaft in Africa and also acted in other films.

He was the president of the Union of African Performing Artists, Director of the Training of African Actors in Zimbabwe, Editor of World Encyclopedia of Contemporary Theatre (UNESCO Edition), and was the chairman of the African Actors Association. He also worked for the Rockefeller Foundation.

Debebe entered to politics as the chief of the Public Relations Department of the Coalition for Unity and Democracy (CUD), an opposition coalition that greatly involved to the 2005 general election. The EPRDF government began detaining all politicians of CUD, including Debebe on the ground of alleged treason. He was sent to Kaliti Prison along with other journalists and CUD members and was released on pardon in 2007.

== Personal life and death ==
Debebe was married to Almaz Dejene since 1970s, and was the father of four children.

Debebe died on 17 August 2025. Prime Minister Abiy Ahmed recognized his contributions following his death. On 19 August, his funeral was held at Holy Trinty Cathedral in Addis Ababa, with many beloved relatives, supporters, senior government officials and dignitaries presented. The Chief Whip at the House of Peoples’ Representatives Tesfaye Beljige, Government Communication Service Minister Legesse Tulu, Social Affairs Advisor to the Prime Minister Daniel Kibret, Peace Minister Mohamed Edris, and Education Minister Berhanu Nega are also presented at his crematorium.
