= Liban (woreda) =

District in Oromia Region, Ethiopia

Liban is a woreda in Oromia Region, Ethiopia. It was part of former Yaya Gulele fi liban Aanaa. Part of the Kaba Shewa Zone, Liban is bordered on the north west by Gerar Jarso, on the south west by Yaya Gulele, on the south and south east by Wuchale and on the north east by Amhara Region. The administrative center of Liban is Liban

== Demographics ==
The 2007 national census reported a total population for this woreda of 45,179, of whom 23,351 were men and 21,828 were women; 8,955 or 19.82% of its population were urban dwellers. The majority of the inhabitants said they practised Ethiopian Orthodox Christianity, with 99.29% of the population reporting they practised that belief.
