= Ali Doro =

Town in Oromia, Ethiopia

Ali Doro is the smallest town in North Shewa Zone, in the Oromia Region of Ethiopia. The town is located on the main street from Addis Ababa to Gojjam between Gerba Guracha and Degem.

In March 2025, reports of up to 50 passengers were abducted while riding a bus through the town, by an armed militia group. The bus was travelling from Addis Ababa to Debre Markos, on a route that was previously the site of other hijackings.
