= Redwan Hussien =

Ethiopian politician (born 1971)

- ሬድዋን ሑሴን
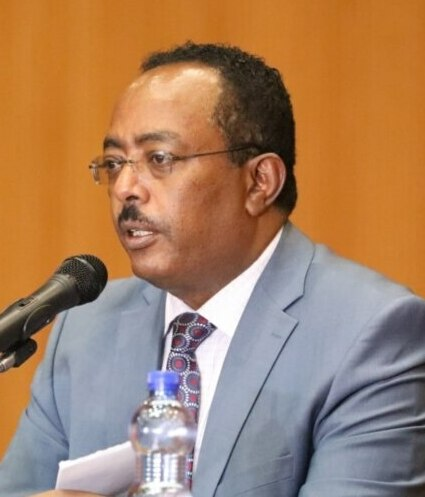

Director General of the National Intelligence and Security Service
- Incumbent
- Assumed office 8 February 2024
- President: Sahle-Work Zewde; Taye Atske Selassie
- Prime Minister: Abiy Ahmed
- Preceded by: Temesgen Tiruneh

National Security Affairs Advisor to the Prime Minister
- In office 9 June 2022 – 8 February 2024
- President: Sahle-Work Zewde
- Prime Minister: Abiy Ahmed
- Preceded by: Gedu Andargachew

Ambassador of Ethiopia to Eritrea
- In office 19 July 2018 – 19 July 2019
- Prime Minister: Abiy Ahmed

Minister of Youth and Sports
- In office 2015–2018
- Prime Minister: Hailemariam Desalegn

Minister of Communication
- In office 2013–2015
- Prime Minister: Hailemariam Desalegn

Deputy Mayor of Addis Ababa
- In office 2011–2013
- Prime Minister: Meles Zenawi; Hailemariam Desalegn

Personal details
- Born: 22 September 1971 (age 55) Siltie, Shewa Province, Ethiopian Empire
- Party: Prosperity Party
- Other political affiliations: EPRDF (1991–2018); SEPD
- Education: Addis Ababa University; Azusa Pacific University

Redwan Hussien (Amharic: ሬድዋን ሑሴን; born 22 September 1971) is an Ethiopian politician who is serving as Director General of the National Intelligence and Security Service. He previously served as National security Advisor to the Prime Minister of Ethiopia. He previously served as Deputy Minister of foreign affairs and Ambassador of Ethiopia to Eritrea.

== Early life ==
Redwan received his BSC in Biology from the Addis Ababa University in 1995. He received an MA in Organizational Leadership form AZUSA Pacific University in 2006. After graduating from Addis Ababa University, he taught biology at senior secondary schools including Jinka Secondary School in South Omo Zone and Awolia Secondary School in Addis Ababa. He was the head of the SNNPR Bureau of Education from 2004 to 2008.

== Career ==
Redwan served as Ambassador to Eritrea from 2018 to 2019. Before taking up his new position, he served in various higher government positions in Federal Government and the Southern Nations, Nationalities, and Peoples' Region government. He is an executive committee member of the Ethiopian People's Revolutionary Democratic Front (since 2006) and the Southern Ethiopian People's Democratic Movement (since 2004). From 2006 to 2010 Hussien served as a Member of House of Federation representing the Silt'e people.

On 2 November 2022, Redwan was the Ethiopian government representative present for the signing of the agreement to permanently cease hostilities with the Tigray People's Liberation Front (TPLF).
