= Yaya Gulele =

District in Oromia Region, Ethiopia

Coordinates: 9°30′N 38°40′E

Yaya Gulele is a woreda in Oromia Region, Ethiopia. It was part of former Yaya Gulelena Tulluu Liban which was separated from Liban woreda and Yaya Gulele district. Part of the North Shewa Zone, Yaya Gulele is bordered on the south by Mulona Sululta, on the southwest by the Muger River which separates it from the West Shewa Zone, on the west by Degem, on the north by Gerar Jarso, on the north east by Liban woreda, and on the east by Wuchale. Towns in Yaya Gulele include Fital.

== Demographics ==
The 2007 national census reported a total population for this woreda of 54,992, of whom 28,168 were men and 26,824 were women; 2,607 or 4.74% of its population were urban dwellers. The majority of the inhabitants said they practised Ethiopian Orthodox Christianity, with 98.53% of the population reporting they practised that belief.

Based on figures published by the Central Statistical Agency in 2005, Yaya Gulele has an estimated total population of 113,150, of whom 56,071 are men and 57,079 are women; 11,849 or 10.47% of its population are urban dwellers, which is greater than the Zone average of 9.5%. With an estimated area of 594.85 square kilometers, Yaya Gulelena Debre Liban has an estimated population density of 190.2 people per square kilometre, which is greater than the Zone average of 143.

The 1994 national census reported a total population for Yaya Gulele of 80,365, of whom 40,692 were men and 39,673 women; 6,627 or 8.25% of its population were urban dwellers at the time. The two largest ethnic groups reported in Yaya Gulele were the Oromo (83.75%), and the Amhara (16.1%); all other ethnic groups made up 0.15% of the population. Oromo was spoken as a first language by 83.39%, while 16.51% spoke Amharic; the remaining 0.1% spoke all other primary languages reported. The majority of the inhabitants professed Ethiopian Orthodox Christianity, with 99.62% of the population reporting they practised that belief.
