= Aisha Mohammed =

Aisha Mohammed may refer to:

- Aisha Mohammed (basketball)
- Aisha Mohammed (politician)
