= Hidabu Abote =

One of the woredas in the Oromia Regional state of Ethiopia

Coordinates: 9°50′N 38°30′E

Hidabu Abote is one of the Aanaas in the Oromia of Ethiopia. Part of the Kaba Shewa Zone, Hidabu Abote is bordered on the south by Kuyu, on the west by Wara Jarso, on the north by the Jamma River which separates it from Dera, and on the east by Degem. The major town in Hidabu Abote is Ejere Notable high points include Mount Ileu.

== Demographics ==
The 2007 national census reported a total population for this woreda of 82,994, of whom 41,215 were men and 41,779 were women; 6,395 or 7.71% of its population were urban dwellers. The majority of the inhabitants said they practised Ethiopian Orthodox Christianity, with 99.1% of the population reporting they observed this belief.

Based on figures published by the Central Statistical Agency in 2005, this woreda has an estimated total population of 89,863, of whom 45,278 are men and 44,585 are women; 3,556 or 3.96% of its population are urban dwellers, which is less than the Zone average of 9.5%. With an estimated area of 497.82 square kilometers, Hidabu Abote has an estimated population density of 180.5 people per square kilometer, which is greater than the Zone average of 143.

The 1994 national census reported a total population for this woreda of 64,809, of whom 32,340 were men and 32,469 women; 1,992 or 3.07% of its population were urban dwellers at the time. The two largest ethnic groups reported in Hidabu Abote were the Oromo (97.53%), and the Amhara (2.37%); all other ethnic groups made up 0.1% of the population. Oromo was spoken as a first language by 98.09%, and 1.87% spoke Amharic; the remaining 0.04% spoke all other primary languages reported. The majority of the inhabitants professed Ethiopian Orthodox Christianity, with 99.04% of the population reporting they practiced that belief.
