= Theatre Museum =

British national performing arts museum

Coordinates: 51°30′43″N 0°7′16″W

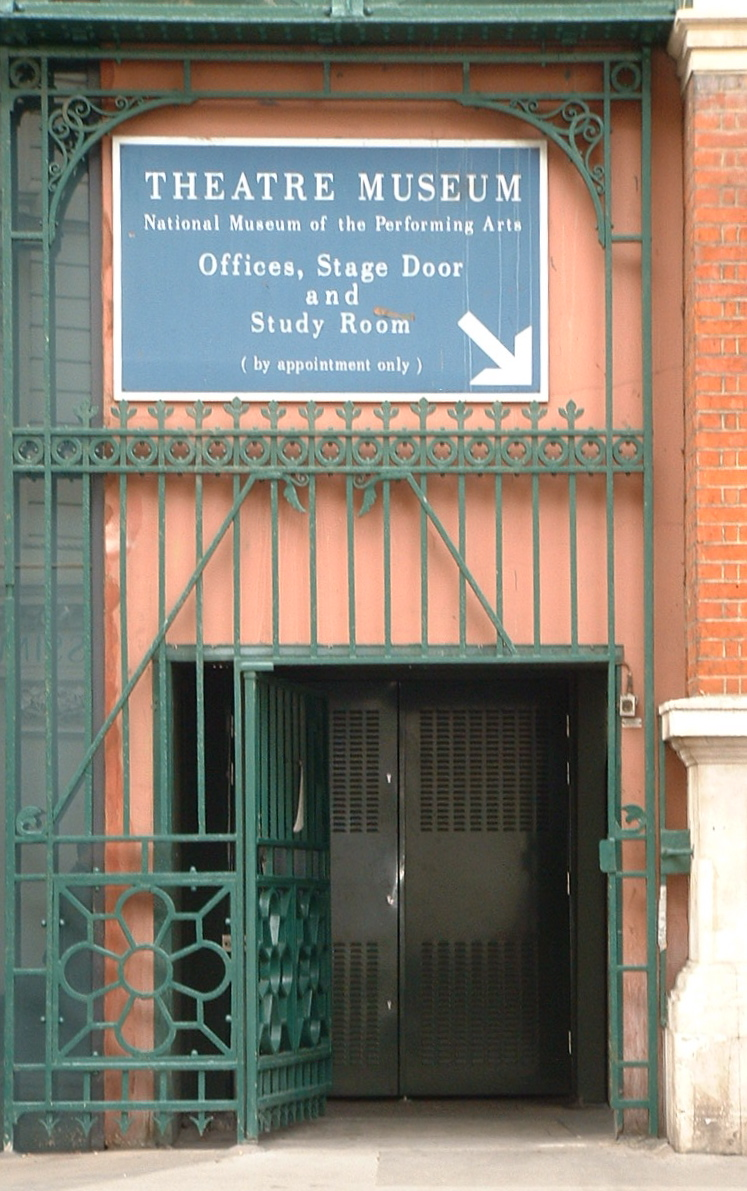
The stage door to the museum, before its closure

The Theatre Museum in the Covent Garden district of London, England, was the United Kingdom's national museum of the performing arts. It was a branch of the UK's national museum of applied arts, the Victoria and Albert Museum. It opened in 1974 and closed in 2007, being replaced by new galleries at the V&A's main site in South Kensington.

The Theatre Museum told the story of the performing arts in Britain from the sixteenth century to the present. It covered all the live performing arts including drama, dance, opera, musical theatre, circus, puppetry, music hall and live art. It claimed to have the largest collections of documents and artefacts on these subjects in the world. Costumes, designs, manuscripts, books, video recordings, including the National Video Archive of Performance, posters and paintings were used to reconstruct the details of past performances and the lives of performers, past and contemporary.

The museum received its main funding from the British government via the Department for Culture, Media and Sport, and admission was free.

== History ==
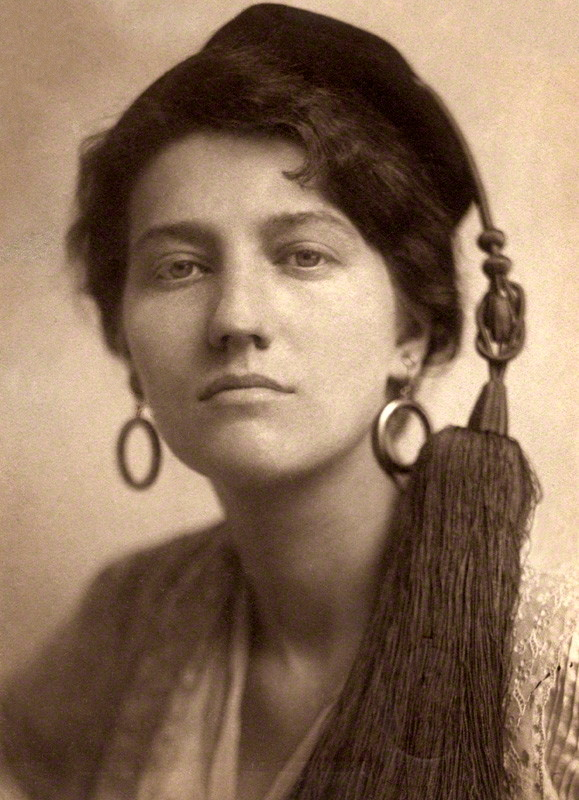
Gabrielle Enthoven, photography by George Charles Beresford, 1904

The origins of the museum can be traced back to 1911 when collector Gabrielle Enthoven began a campaign for the creation of a "National Museum of Theatre Arts". The Victoria & Albert Museum accepted custodianship of Enthoven's collection in 1924, and she continued to add to it until her death in 1950.

In 1971 Harry R. Beard donated his collection of over 20,000 theatrical and operatic prints, texts, and programmes. The Theatre Museum was created as a separate institution in 1974 when the two collections held by the V&A were combined with those of the British Theatre Museum Association, which had been founded in 1957 to collect theatrical material to increase the impetus for the creation of a separate national museum, and of the Friends of the Museum of Performing Arts, another private endeavour towards the creation of a theatrical museum, which owned much Ballets Russes material.

The new museum acquired many further collections through gift, purchase and bequest. These included the archives of the English Stage Company at the Royal Court Theatre and of the D'Oyly Carte Opera Company (relating to Gilbert and Sullivan operas), the design collections of the Arts Council and British Council, the Antony Hippisley Coxe Circus Collection and the British Model Theatre and Puppet Guild Collection. In 1987 the museum moved into converted premises in Covent Garden. In the 1990s it placed renewed emphasis on the acquisition of 20th century material. In 1993 the National Video Archive of Stage Performance (later renamed National Video Archive of Performance) filmed its first production, Richard III starring Ian McKellen. The collection included over 200 productions by 2008.

=== Closure ===
On 26 September 2006, it was announced that the museum would close in January 2007 because of a lack of funds. A group called The Guardians of The Theatre Museum was formed in late Autumn 2006 by the theatre community to try to support the museum.

In December 2006, it was announced that the Victoria and Albert Museum and Blackpool Council were in discussions to move the archives to Blackpool, where a new National Museum of Performing Arts would be located. The reasons given by the local council were that Blackpool has a strong theatre history, has one of the most diverse and thriving theatre districts in the UK and also houses the National Theatre of Variety.

On 7 January 2007, after failing to raise £5 million for refurbishment of the premises in Covent Garden, the closure of the museum was confirmed.

=== Later status ===
The Theatre Museum was temporarily called the V&A Theatre Collections and moved permanently to the Victoria and Albert Museum. The department contributed to the exhibitions Collaborators: UK Design for Performance 2003–2007 (in association with the Society of British Theatre Designers), Kylie – The Exhibition and The Story of the Supremes. From March 2009, to coincide with the opening of new Performance Galleries within the V&A, it became the Theatre & Performance Department. The reading room remained open to researchers at Blythe House, Kensington Olympia. The department also owned TheatreVoice.

The Theatre & Performance department strengthened its work in many areas following its relocation to the V&A. Its successful exhibition programme included Diaghilev and the Golden Age of the Ballets Russes (2011), David Bowie Is (2013), Hollywood Costume (2013), You Say You Want a Revolution (2016), and Opera: Passion, Power and Politics (2017). Several of these toured internationally, with David Bowie Is attracting two million visitors by the end of its tour.

Over the same period the department continued to make major acquisitions, some supported by the National Lottery and other funders, and these involved outreach and engagement project. Notable examples are the acquisition of the Peter Brook Archive and the Glastonbury Archive. The Theatre & Performance department continued to maintain ongoing, active relationships with several key performing arts companies, in effect acting as company archives by preserving vital records of contemporary work in theatre. Examples include the Royal Court, Talawa Theatre Company, Akram Khan Company, the Young Vic and the Almeida Theatre.

Other major acquisitions focused on the work of individuals such as Vivien Leigh, P J Harvey, June Whitfield, Ronnie Barker and Bronislava Nijinska.

In 2021 the department faced discontinuation under a major V&A restructuring plan brought about by the museum's COVID-related financial deficits. This restructuring would cut Theatre and Performance staffing disproportionately and distribute its remaining curators across several departments, thus abolishing it as a distinct entity and a focus for performing arts documentation and research. A campaign and petition to save the department was initiated by SIBMAS (the International Association for Performing Arts Libraries and Museums).

== See also ==
- List of museums in London
- West End theatre
