= Kuyu =

Ethiopian administrative division

Coordinates: 9°20′N 39°15′E

Kuyu is one of the Aanaas in Oromiya of Ethiopia. Part of Kaba Shewa Zone, Kuyu is bordered on the south and west by Muger River which separates it from West Shewa Zone, on the north by Wara Jarso, on the northeast by Hidabu Abote, and on the east by Degem. The administrative center of Kuyu is Gebre Guracha.

== Demographics ==
The 2007 national census reported a total population for this woreda of 121,052, of whom 60,244 were men and 60,808 were women; 19,872 or 16.42% of the population were urban dwellers. The majority of the inhabitants, around 92.57% of the population were Ethiopian Orthodox Christian, while 5.89% of the population were Protestant, and 1.01% of the population practiced traditional beliefs.

Based on figures published by the Central Statistical Agency in 2005, this woreda has an estimated total population of 140,236, of whom 70,724 are men and 69,512 are women; 19,830 or 14.14% of the population are urban dwellers, which is greater than the Zone average of 9.5%. With an estimated area of 939.22 square kilometers, Kuyu has an estimated population density of 149.3 people per square kilometer, which is greater than the Zone average of 143.

The 1994 national census reported a total population for this woreda of 98,753, of whom 49,171 were men and 49,582 women; 11,113 or 11.25% of its population were urban dwellers at the time. The largest ethnic groups reported in Kuyu is Oromo (96.24%), while Amhara is (3.43%);and all other ethnic groups made up 0.33% of the population. Oromo was spoken as a first language by 96.41%, and 3.41% spoke Amharic; the remaining 0.18% spoke all other primary languages reported. The majority of the inhabitants professed Ethiopian Orthodox Christianity, with 96.92% of the population reporting they practiced that belief, while 6.87% of the population said they were Muslim, and 2.29% were Protestant.
