= Tullu Milki =

Town in Oromia Region, Ethiopia

Tullu Milki Tullu Milkii (Oromo)
- Town
- Location within Ethiopia
- Coordinates: 9°54′N 38°21′E
- Country: Ethiopia
- Region: Oromia
- Zone: North Shewa
- Time zone: UTC+3 (EAT)
- Area code: 11

Tullu Milki (also spelled Tulluu Milkii) is a town in central Oromia Region. Located in North Shewa Zone, Ethiopia. This town lies about 170 kilometers north west of Addis Ababa. It has a latitude and longitude of 9°54′N 38°21′E.

Based on figures from the Central Statistical Agency in 2005, Tullu Milki has an estimated total population of 2,870 of whom 1,339 were males and 1,531 were females. The 1994 census reported this town had a total population of 1,608 of whom 726 were males and 882 were females. Tullu Milki is the largest settlement in Wara Jarso sub-zone.
