= Aisha Mohammed (politician) =

Ethiopian engineer and politician

- አይሻ መሀመድ
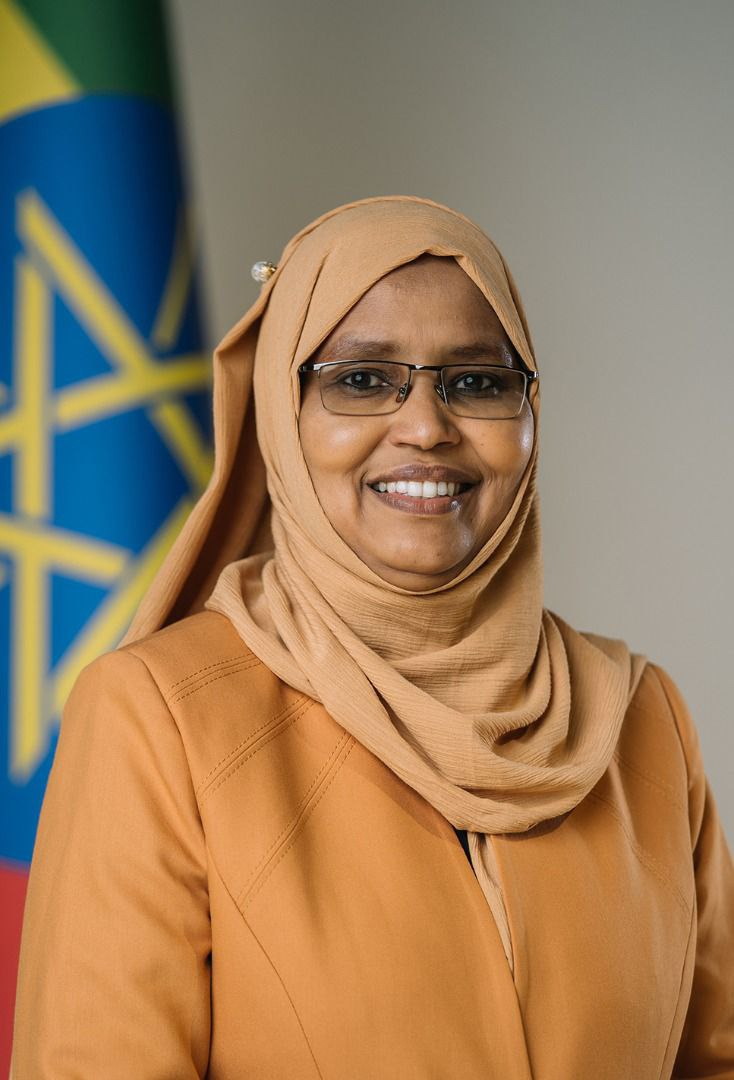

Minister of Defense
- Incumbent
- Assumed office 20 May 2024
- Preceded by: Abraham Belay
- In office 16 October 2018 – 18 April 2019
- President: Sahle-Work Zewde
- Prime Minister: Abiy Ahmed
- Preceded by: Siraj Fegessa
- Succeeded by: Lemma Megersa

Minister of Irrigation and Lowland Areas Development
- In office 6 October 2021 – 20 May 2024
- President: Sahle-Work Zewde
- Prime Minister: Abiy Ahmed
- Preceded by: Seleshi Bekele
- Succeeded by: Abraham Belay

Minister of Urban Development and Construction
- In office 18 April 2018 – 6 October 2021
- President: Sahle-Work Zewde
- Prime Minister: Abiy Ahmed
- Preceded by: Jantirar Abay
- Succeeded by: Chaltu Sani

Personal details
- Born: Berhale, Ethiopia
- Relatives: Ibrahim Osman Aliyu (cousin)
- Education: Addis Ababa University

Aisha Mohammed Mussa is an Ethiopian engineer and politician who is currently serving as Minister of Defense since 20 May 2024. Also, she was defense minister from October 2018 to April 2019. Aisha had previously served Minister of Irrigation and Lowland Areas Development from 6 October 2021 and the Minister of Construction and Urban Development from 18 April 2019 to 6 October 2021.

== Early life and education ==
Aisha Mohammed is a Muslim from the country's Afar Region in the north east Ethiopia. She was born in Berhale and grew up in Assab. She has a degree in Civil Engineering and a masters in Transformational Leadership and Change.

== Career ==
Aisha Mohammed is a civil engineer and previously served as construction minister. She also served as Minister of Tourism and Culture. She was appointed Defence Minister by Prime Minister Abiy Ahmed on 16 October 2018, one of ten women appointed to the twenty member cabinet, making Ethiopia and Rwanda the only African countries to have equal gender representation in their cabinets. Mohammed was the country's first female defence minister. On 18 April 2019, she was appointed Minister of Urban Development and Construction. On 20 May 2024, she has been serving as Minister of Defense again.
