= Wuchale (woreda) =

District in Oromia Region, Ethiopia

Coordinates: 9°25′N 38°50′E

Wuchale is a woreda in the Oromia Region, Ethiopia. It was part of the former woreda of Wuchalena Jido which was separated for Jido and Wuchale woredas.. Part of the Kaba Shewa Zone, Wuchale is bordered on the south by Berehna Aleltu, on the west by Mulona Sululta, on the northwest by Yaya Gulele], on the northeast by the Amhara Region, on the east by Liban woreda, and on the southeast by Kembibit. Towns in Wuchale include Muka and Turi.

== Demographics ==
The 2007 national census reported a total population for this woreda of 97,529, of whom 49,236 were men and 48,293 were women; 6,426 or 6.59% of its population were urban dwellers. The majority of the inhabitants said they practised Ethiopian Orthodox Christianity, with 98.21% of the population reporting they practised that belief, and 1.17% were Muslim.

Based on figures published by the Central Statistical Agency in 2005, Wuchalena Jido had an estimated total population of 142,131, of whom 71,950 were men and 70,181 were women; 6,334 or 4.46% of its population was urban dwellers, which is less than the Zone average of 9.5%. With an estimated area of 1,125.63 square kilometers, Wuchalena Jido had an estimated population density of 126.3 people per square kilometer, which is less than the Zone average of 143.

The 1994 national census reported a total population for Wuchalena Jido of 102,382, of whom 50,834 were men and 51,548 women; 3,547 or 3.46% of its population were urban dwellers at the time. The three largest ethnic groups reported in Wuchalena Jido were the Oromo (93.09%), the Amhara (6.21%) and the Werji (0.61%); all other ethnic groups made up 0.09% of the population. Oromo was spoken as a first language by 94.4%, and 5.55% spoke Amharic; the remaining 0.38% spoke all other primary languages reported. The majority of the inhabitants professed Ethiopian Orthodox Christianity, with 98.09% of the population reporting they practiced that belief, while 1.14% of the population said they were Muslim.
