= National Metrology Institute of Ethiopia =

Ethiopian government agency

National Meteorology Institute of Ethiopia
- የኢትዮጵያ ሚትራኦሎጂካል ኢኒስቲቲውት

Agency overview
- Formed: 31 December 1980
- Preceding agency: Ethiopian Meteorological Institute
- Jurisdiction: Ethiopia
- Headquarters: Bole subcity, Addis Ababa, Ethiopia
- Agency executive: Abdu Abagibe, Director General
- Parent agency: Ministry of Trade and Industry
- Website: www.ethiomet.gov.et

The National Meteorology Institute of Ethiopia (Amharic: የኢትዮጵያ ብሄራዊ የሜትሮሎጂ ኢኒስቲቲውት; NMIE), formerly known as the Ethiopian Meteorological Institute (Amharic: የኢትዮጵያ ሚትራኦሎጂካል ኢኒስቲቲውት; EMI), is an Ethiopian government agency responsible for meteorology related services in Ethiopia. It was founded in 1980 under proclamation No 201/1980.

== History ==
The Ethiopian Meteorological Institute was established on 31 December 1980 under proclamation No 201/1980 to foster meteorology related service. It has operated 11 regional meteorological service centers. In 2011, it was renamed as the National Metrology Institute of Ethiopia (NMIE) by the Council of Ministers Regulation number 194/2011.
