= Dera, Oromia =

District in Oromia Region, Ethiopia

Coordinates: 10°10′N 38°40′E

Dera (Oromo: Deeraa, Amharic: ደራ) is a woreda in the Oromia Region, Ethiopia. Part of the Kaba Shewa Zone, Dera is bordered on the south by the Jamma River which separates it from Hidabu Abote and Wara Jarso, on the west, north and east by the Amhara Region; the Abay River defines the western boundary, and its tributary the Walaqa River the northern. The administrative center of Dera is Gundo Meskel.

The woreda government announced March 2008 the completion of infrastructure improvements, which consisted of 77 kilometers of new road and an additional 366 kilometers renovated at a cost of 2.6 million Birr.

== Demographics ==
The 2007 national census reported a total population for this woreda of 141,426, of whom 70,787 were men and 70,639 were women; 10,531 or 14.89% of its population were urban dwellers. The majority of the inhabitants said they practised Ethiopian Orthodox Christianity, with 64.87% of the population reporting they practised that belief, and 34.92% were Muslim.

Based on figures published by the Central Statistical Agency in 2005, this woreda has an estimated total population of 193,214, of whom 99,085 are men and 94,129 are women; 5,719 or 2.96% of its population are urban dwellers, which is less than the Zone average of 9.5%. With an estimated area of 1,550.47 square kilometers, Dera has an estimated population density of 124.6 people per square kilometer, which is less than the Zone average of 143.

The 1994 national census reported a total population for this woreda of 139,661, of whom 68,474 were men and 71,187 women; 3,210 or 2.3% of its population were urban dwellers at the time. Dera is almost evenly divided between the two largest ethnic groups reported in this woreda: the Oromo (50.18%), and the Amhara (49.76%). Further, Amharic was spoken as a first language by 50.69%, and 49.28% spoke Oromo. The majority of the inhabitants professed Ethiopian Orthodox Christianity, with 64.49% of the population reporting they practiced that belief, while 35.45% of the population said they were Muslim.
