= Kassahun Gofe =

Ethiopian politician

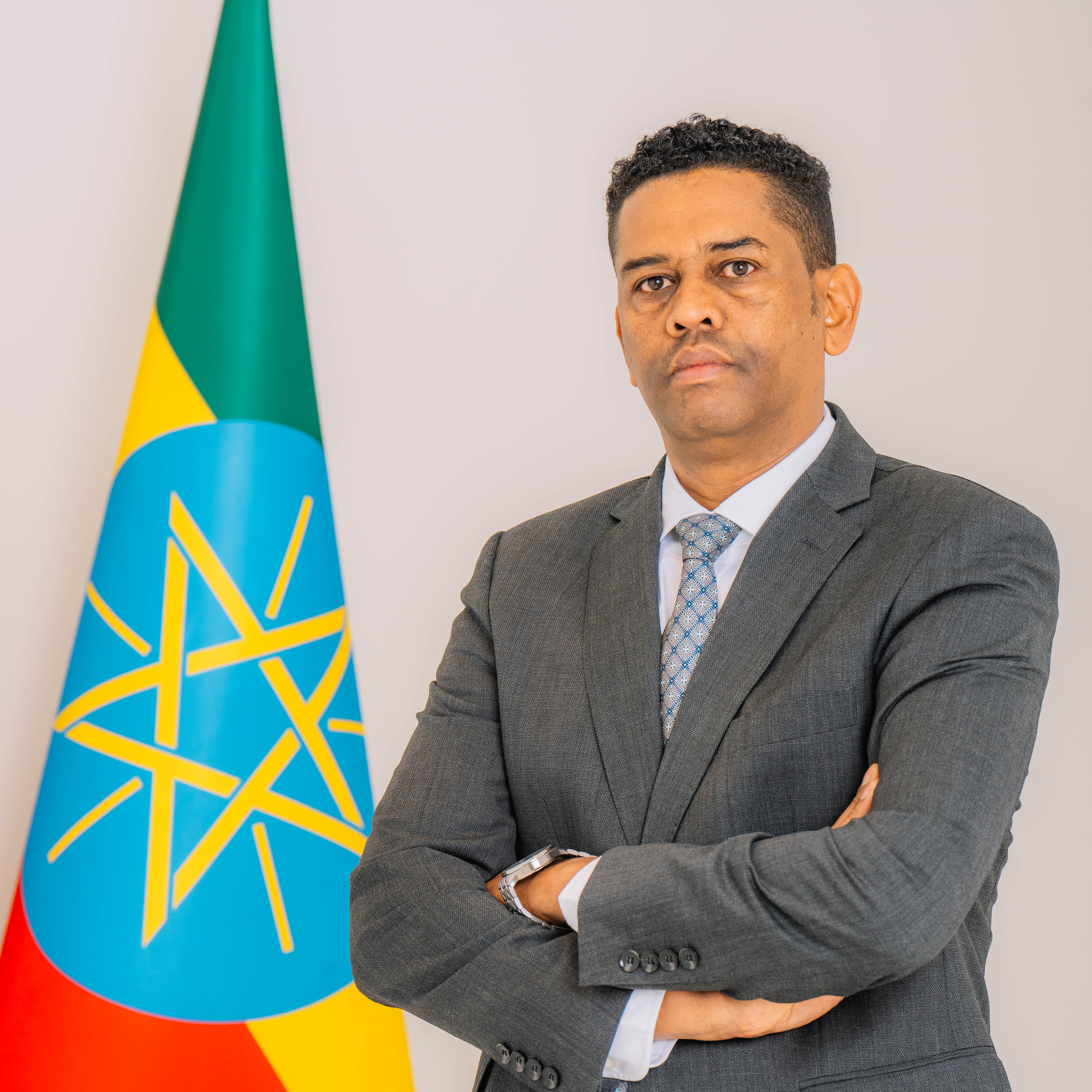

Minister of Trade and Regional Integration
- Incumbent
- Assumed office 3 July 2024
- President: Sahle-Work Zewde; Taye Atske Selassie
- Prime Minister: Abiy Ahmed
- Preceded by: Gebremeskel Chala

Infrastructure Division State Minister for Ministry of Transport and Logistics
- In office 9 October 2021 – 3 July 2024

State Minister of for Government Communication Affairs
- In office 10 May 2018 – 5 November 2018
- Prime Minister: Abiy Ahmed
- Succeeded by: Billene Seyoum

Kassahun Gofe (Amharic: ካሳሁን ጎፌ) is an Ethiopian politician who is serving as the Minister of Trade and Regional Integration since 2024. In previous portfolios, he was the Infrastructure Division State Minister for Ministry of Transport and Logistics (2021–2024) and the State Minister of for Government Communication Affairs, later reestablished as Foreign Press Secretary for the Office of Prime Minister of Ethiopia from 10 May to 5 November 2018.

== Governmental positions ==
From 10 May 2018 to 5 November 2018, Kassahun Gofe has been the State Minister of for Government Communication Affairs, which was superseded by Foreign Press Secretary for the Office of Prime Minister of Ethiopia, and replaced by Billene Seyoum.

Kassahun Gofe was the Infrastructure Division State Minister for Ministry of Transport and Logistics upon the cabinet reshuffle on 9 October 2021. On 3 July 2024, Prime Minister Abiy Ahmed appointed him as the Minister of Trade and Regional Integration.
