= Sofie From-Emmesberger =

Finnish diplomat

Sofie From-Emmesberger is a Finnish diplomat. She has chaired the European Union Political and Security Committee and is serving as the European Commission's Director General of the Department for Africa and the Middle East until 31 August 2025.

== Career ==
From-Emmesberger studied law at the University of Helsinki. She speaks Swedish, Finnish, English, German and French.

From-Emmesberger joined the Ministry for Foreign Affairs in 1996. She was as Permanent Representative of Finland to the United Nations in Nairobi from 2011 to 2015. She has also served as the Finnish Ambassador to Kenya, Somalia, Uganda, Eritrea and the Seychelles and to The North Atlantic Treaty Organization (NATO).

From-Emmesberger was chair of the European Union Political and Security Committee from 2018 to 2021.

On 29 June 2021, From-Emmesberger was appointed Director General of the European Commission's Department for Africa and the Middle East. The appointment is for a fixed term from 15 October 2021 to 31 August 2025. She presented her credentials to President of Ethiopia Taye Atske-Selassie. In this role, she has encouraged support for Ethiopia's digital economy.
