= Gedu Andargachew =

Ethiopian politician (born 1963)

- ገዱ አንዳርጋቸው
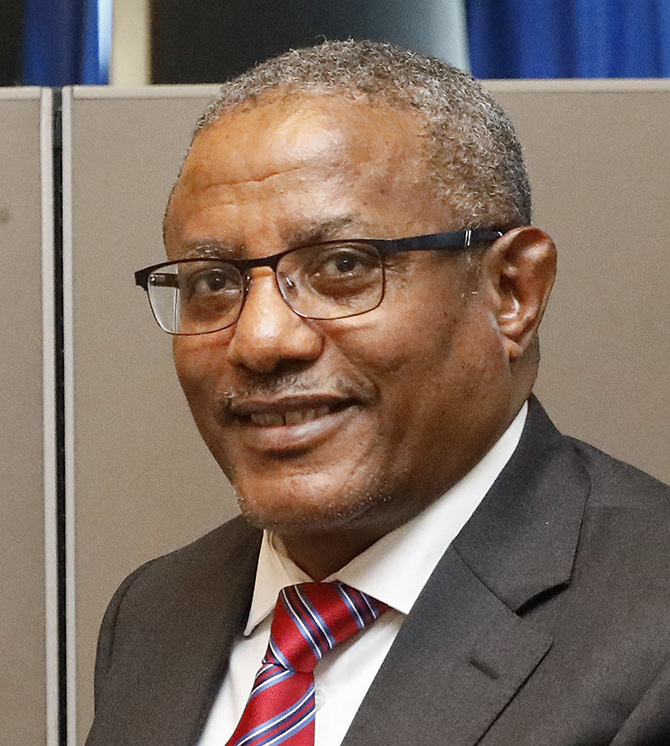
- Gedu in 2019

National Security Affairs Advisor to the Prime Minister
- In office 4 November 2020 – 9 June 2022
- President: Sahle-Work Zewde
- Prime Minister: Abiy Ahmed
- Preceded by: Temesgen Tiruneh
- Succeeded by: Redwan Hussein

Minister of Foreign Affairs
- In office 18 April 2019 – 4 November 2020
- Prime Minister: Abiy Ahmed
- Preceded by: Workneh Gebeyehu
- Succeeded by: Demeke Mekonnen

Chief Administrator of Amhara Region
- In office 2013–2019
- Preceded by: Ayalew Gobeze
- Succeeded by: Ambachew Mekonnen

Personal details
- Born: 13 August 1963 (age 62) Wollo Province, Ethiopian Empire
- Party: Prosperity Party
- Other political affiliations: Ethiopian People's Revolutionary Democratic Front; Amhara Democratic Party (until 2019)
- Education: Chet Primary and Junior Secondary School; Wogel-Tena Secondary Comprehensive School
- Alma mater: Ethiopian Civil Service University (BA); Azusa Pacific University (MA)

Gedu Andargachew Alene (Amharic: ገዱ አንዳርጋቸው አለነ; born 13 August 1963) is an Ethiopian politician who has served as the National Security Affairs Advisor to the prime minister of Ethiopia from 4 November 2020 to 9 June 2022. He served as president of the Amhara Region from 2013 to 2019 and served as deputy president of the region and head of the agriculture bureau. He also served as the Minister of Foreign Affairs from April 2019 to November 2020.

== Life and career ==
Gedu Andargachew was born on 13 August 1963 in Wollo Province, Ethiopia. From 1979 to 1985, he attended at Chet Primary and Junior Secondary School in Amhara region and subsequently attended at Wogel-Tena Secondary Comprehensive School, from 1987-1989. From 1998 to 2001, he held Bachelor degree in development administration from Ethiopian Civil Service University in Addis Ababa.

Before graduating by Masters of Arts degree from Azusa Pacific University in May 2007, Gedu studied in organizational leadership studies.

Gedu was first selected in 2013 to replace Ayalew Gobeze, and was successively reelected by the regional legislature in 2015 and 2018. He resigned on 8 March 2019 for he reasons that were unclear, though in his farewell address he warned of rising inter-ethnic tensions with the Tigray Region. Gedu has served as Minister of Foreign Affairs from 2019 to 2020, President of Amhara Region from 2013 to 2019 and Deputy from 2008 to 2013 until he was replaced by Ambachew Mekonnen.

During his presidency, he had played great efforts socio-economic policy, contributing to the Amhara Democratic Party (ANDM) existence in regional level and EPRDF influence in the national level. In November 2020, he was elected by Prime Minister Abiy Ahmed as the National Security Affairs Advisor to the prime minister of Ethiopia until he was succeeded by Redwan Hussein.
