= Wara Jarso =

District in Oromia Region, Ethiopia

Coordinates: 9°50′N 38°15′E

Wara Jarso (Oromo: Warra Jaarsoo) is a woreda in the Oromia Region, Ethiopia. Part of the North Shewa Zone, Wara Jarso is bordered on the south by Kuyu, on the west by the Muger River which separates it from the [[West Shewa Zone]], on the north by the Abay River which separates it from the Amhara Region, on the northeast by the Jamma River which separates it from Dera, and on the east by Hidabu Abote. Towns in Wara Jarso include Filiklik, Gohatsion and Tullu Milki.

Wara Jarso is connected to Dejen in Amhara by the Abay Bridge, which also carries the Addis Ababa-Bahir Dar highway; before the bridge was erected, the Abay was crossed at the Shefartak ford (at 10° 5' N 38° 17' E). A new bridge, the Hidasie Bridge, was dedicated 10 September 2008 at the presence of senior government officials and other guests. Funded by the Japanese government at a cost of 319.3 Birr, the Hidasie Bridge is 303 meters long and part of the new Addis Ababa-Dejen road.

== Demographics ==
The 2007 national census reported a total population for this woreda of 141,426, of whom 70,787 were men and 70,639 were women; 10,531 or 7.45% of its population were urban dwellers. The majority of the inhabitants said they practiced Ethiopian Orthodox Christianity, with 93.55% of the population reporting they observed this belief, while 4.65% of the population were Protestant, and 1.46% of the population were Muslim.

Based on figures published by the Central Statistical Agency in 2005, this woreda has an estimated total population of 159,653, of whom 80,075 are men and 79,578 are women; 11,934 or 7.47% of its population are urban dwellers, which is less than the Zone average of 9.5%. With an estimated area of 1,172.97 square kilometers, Wara Jarso has an estimated population density of 136.1 people per square kilometer, which is less than the Zone average of 143.

The 1994 national census reported a total population for this woreda of 114,212, of whom 57,254 were men and 56,958 women; 6,691 or 5.86% of its population were urban dwellers at the time. The two largest ethnic groups reported in Wara Jarso were the Oromo (78.11%), and the Amhara (21.68%); all other ethnic groups made up 0.21% of the population. Oromiffa was spoken as a first language by 76.26%, and 23.68% spoke Amharic; the remaining 0.06% spoke all other primary languages reported. The majority of the inhabitants professed Ethiopian Orthodox Christianity, with 96.74% of the population reporting they practiced that belief, while 1.96% said they were Protestant, and 1.13% of the population were Moslem.

== Climate ==
Climate data for Gohatsion, elevation 2,550 m (8,370 ft)
Month	Jan	Feb	Mar	Apr	May	Jun	Jul	Aug	Sep	Oct	Nov	Dec	Year
Mean daily maximum °C (°F)	23.1 (73.6)	24.2 (75.6)	24.7 (76.5)	25.2 (77.4)	23.8 (74.8)	22.7 (72.9)	18.7 (65.7)	18.3 (64.9)	20.0 (68.0)	21.5 (70.7)	21.2 (70.2)	21.7 (71.1)	22.1 (71.8)
Daily mean °C (°F)	16.3 (61.3)	17.3 (63.1)	18.2 (64.8)	18.6 (65.5)	17.8 (64.0)	16.7 (62.1)	14.5 (58.1)	14.1 (57.4)	15.1 (59.2)	15.8 (60.4)	15.0 (59.0)	14.8 (58.6)	16.2 (61.1)
Mean daily minimum °C (°F)	9.6 (49.3)	10.5 (50.9)	11.5 (52.7)	12.0 (53.6)	11.8 (53.2)	10.8 (51.4)	10.1 (50.2)	10.0 (50.0)	10.1 (50.2)	10.1 (50.2)	8.6 (47.5)	7.8 (46.0)	10.2 (50.4)
Average precipitation mm (inches)	2 (0.1)	11 (0.4)	26 (1.0)	40 (1.6)	131 (5.2)	146 (5.7)	291 (11.5)	245 (9.6)	144 (5.7)	33 (1.3)	20 (0.8)	6 (0.2)	1,095 (43.1)
Average relative humidity (%)	50	49	49	56	52	65	77	79	72	54	51	49	59
Source: FAO
