= Daniel Kibret =

Ethiopian politician and former deacon

- ዳንኤል ክብረት

Social Affairs Advisor to the Prime Minister
- Incumbent
- Assumed office 23 June 2018
- President: Sahle-Work Zewde; Taye Atske Selassie
- Prime Minister: Abiy Ahmed

Personal details
- Party: Independent
- Occupation: Politician; deacon; author

Daniel Kibret (Amharic: ዳንኤል ክብረት) is an Ethiopian politician and deacon of the Ethiopian Orthodox Tewahedo Church. Being one of founders of Mahibere Kidusan (a spiritual association in the EOTC), his sermons, in depth writings and powerful oratorical speeches both within and outside the church has attracted millions of Ethiopians domestically and around the world. Having writing 35 books in his over 30 years service, Deacon Daniel Kibret was given the honorary title "Muhaze Tibebat" which is an ancient Ethiopic Ge'ez. Then in March 2018, the new elected Prime Minister Abiy Ahmed selected him to be his advisor on social matters. In the election of 2021 he ran an independent campaign and won a parliamentary seat representing a region in Addis Ababa. He is also the director of state-owned news agency Ethiopian News Agency.

Daniel Kibret is able to cultivate and grab the attention of both his supporters and those that strongly disagree with him. In only seven years of service in the political stage, Deacon Daniel Kibret is able to cement his footprints in Ethiopia's political stage, like he was able to in the Ethiopian Orthodox Tewahedo Church.

== Career ==
Daniel Kibret was ordained as a deacon to the Ethiopian Orthodox Tewahedo Church and became a preacher in Mahibere Kidusan.

On 23 June 2018, he was nominated as a director of the Ethiopian News Agency after a House of Federation vote. From 285 members, 126 MPs were against his nomination. Kibret denied being a member of the Prosperity Party, instead saying he is an advisor of Prime Minister Abiy Ahmed on social affairs.

In July 2024, he was able to publish his 35th book called Blessing and Curse (Amharic: "ዕዳና በረከት") that was innagurated in the presence of Prime Minister Dr. Abiy Ahmed, and many other prominent government officials. In his speech about the book, PM Dr. Abiy Ahmed said, "Deacon Daniel Kibret not only wrote about her Ethiopia but he artistically drew Ethiopia like I have never witnessed before. I know understand why that Father named him "Muhaze Tibebat." Because the book carries current political issues, it was able to be read by millions across the world in a few months of its publication. The book was the first political book Deacon Daniel Kibret wrote.

== Controversies ==
Daniel Kibret has been criticized for his religious tendency from the Ethiopian Orthodox Church. In 2021, the United States sanctioned Kibret for referring to Tigrayan as "devil" amidst tension during the Tigray War. He also called on Ethiopians to "exterminate Woyane" on 24 January 2022 during a speech, which was shared on social media.

In March 2022, Daniel Kibret responded to a controversial comment by Abune Mathias, in which he said "the [Tigray] war was started to decimate Tigreans from the face of the earth". Kibret responded to the Patriarch that he intended to support the H.R. 6600, which was sponsored by American representative Tom Malinowski.
