= Seleshi Bekele =

Ethiopian politician

- ስለሺ በቀለ
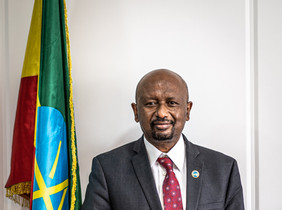

Ambassador of Ethiopia to the US
- In office 6 May 2022 – 26 May 2024
- Succeeded by: Lencho Bati

Chief Negotiator & Advisor on Transboundary Rivers and GERD
- Incumbent
- Assumed office 7 October 2021
- President: Sahle-Work Zewde
- Prime Minister: Abiy Ahmed
- Preceded by: Post established

Minister of Water, Irrigation and Energy
- In office 16 October 2018 – 6 October 2021
- President: Mulatu Teshome; Sahle-Work Zewde
- Prime Minister: Abiy Ahmed
- Succeeded by: Aisha Mohammed

Senior Water and Climate Specialist at UNECA
- In office December 2010 – March 2014

Personal details
- Born: 1960s Ethiopia
- Party: Prosperity Party
- Education: Addis Ababa University(B.Sc); Newcastle University(M.Sc); TU Dresden(Ph.D.)

Seleshi Bekele (Amharic: ስለሺ በቀለ) is an Ethiopian politician and academic who served as the Chief Negotiator and Advisor on Transboundary Rivers and GERD at Office of Prime Minister of Ethiopia since 2021 and ambassador of Ethiopia to the US from 2022 to 2024. Prior to this position, He served as the Minister of Water, Irrigation and Energy of Ethiopia from 2018 to 2021.

== Education ==
He has obtained his bachelor's degree in Civil Engineering from Addis Ababa University in 1987. He also obtained Masters of Science in Hydraulic Engineer in 1992 from Newcastle University and Ph.D. from Technical University of Dresden in Hydraulic and Water Resources Engineering in 2001. He was previously the Dean and CEO of Arba Minch University, where he particularly focused on expanding programs in hydropower and irrigation. He was also a professor there, teaching courses in hydropower, water resources, and environmental impact assessment. For several years after that he led the regional office of the International Water Management for the Nile Basin and East Africa in Addis Ababa.

== Career ==
Seleshi is known for actively participating in the tri-lateral negotiations with Sudan and Egypt in regards to the Grand Ethiopian Renaissance Dam (GERD). He is the first Minister of Water to appear before the U.N. Security Council representing Ethiopia's Standpoint about GERD. On 6 May 2022, he was appointed as ambassador of Ethiopia to the US which lasted until 26 May 2024 for the sake of pursuing his private career.
