= Abichu (woreda) =

District in Oromia Region, Ethiopia

Coordinates: 9°30′N 39°15′E

Abichuna Gne'a ("Aanaa Abichuu") is a woreda in Oromia, Ethiopia. This woreda is named in part for the Abichu Oromo. Part of the Kaba Shewa Zone, Abichu woreda is bordered on the south by Kembibit, on the west by Wuchalena Jido, and on the north and east by the Amhara Region. The major town in Abichu is Mendida.

Two-time Olympic marathon champion Abebe Bikila was born in this woreda, in the village of Jato near Mendida.

== Demographics ==
The 2007 national census reported a total population for this woreda of 74,376, of whom 37,284 were men and 37,092 were women; 5,061 or 6.81% of its population were urban dwellers. The majority of the inhabitants said they practised Ethiopian Orthodox Christianity, with 98.91% of the population reporting they practised that belief.

Based on figures published by the Central Statistical Agency in 2005, this woreda has an estimated total population of 82,565, of whom 41,003 are men and 41,562 are women; 4,502 or 5.45% of its population are urban dwellers, which is less than as the Zone average of 9.5%. With an estimated area of 627.82 square kilometers, Abichu(Aanaa) has an estimated population density of 131.5 people per square kilometer, which is less than the Zone average of 143.

The 1994 national census reported a total population for this woreda of 59,340, of whom 29,631 were men and 29,709 women; 2,522 or 4.25% of its population were urban dwellers at the time. The two largest ethnic groups reported in Abichu(Aanaa) were the Oromo (69.99%), and the Amhara (29.69%); all other ethnic groups made up 0.32% of the population. Oromo was spoken as a first language by 70.07%, and 29.84% spoke Amharic; the remaining 0.09% spoke all other primary languages reported. The majority of the inhabitants professed Ethiopian Orthodox Christianity, with 99.09% of the population reporting they practiced that belief.
