= Gerar Jarso =

District in Oromia Region, Ethiopia

Coordinates: 9°40′N 38°40′E

Gerar Jarso is one of the Aanaas in the Oromia of Ethiopia. Part of the Kaba Shewa Zone, Gerar Jarso is bordered on the south by Yaya Gulele, on the west by Degem, and on the east by the Amhara Region.

== Demographics ==
The 2007 national census reported a total population for this woreda of 67,312, of whom 34,467 were men and 32,845 were women; none of its population were urban dwellers. The majority of the inhabitants said they practised Ethiopian Orthodox Christianity, with 99.81% of the population reporting they observed this belief.

Based on figures published by the Central Statistical Agency in 2005, this woreda has an estimated total population of 119,675, of whom 59,977 are men and 59,698 are women; 37,861 or 31.64% of its population are urban dwellers, which is greater than the Zone average of 9.5%. With an estimated area of 485.32 square kilometers, Gerar Jarso has an estimated population density of 246.6 people per square kilometer, which is greater than the Zone average of 143.

The 1994 national census reported a total population for this woreda of 80,740, of whom 40,221 were men and 40,519 women; 21,187 or 26.24% of its population were urban dwellers at the time. The two largest ethnic groups reported in Gerar Jarso were the Oromo (53.62%), and the Amhara (45.66%); all other ethnic groups made up 0.72% of the population. Oromo was spoken as a first language by 50.55%, and 49.1% spoke Amharic; the remaining 0.39% spoke all other primary languages reported. The majority of the inhabitants professed Ethiopian Orthodox Christianity, with 99.43% of the population reporting they practiced that belief.
