= Degem =

District in Oromiya, Ethiopia

Coordinates: 9°40′N 38°40′E

Degem is one of the Aanaas in North Shewa Zone of Oromiya in Ethiopia. Degem is bordered on the south by Muger River which separates it from west shewa zone, on the west by Kuyu, on the northwest by Hidabu Abote, on the north by Jamma River which separates it from Amhara Region, on the northeast by Gerar Jarso, and on the east by Yaya Gulele. Towns in Degem include Alidoro and hambiso.

== Demographics ==
The 2007 national census reported a total population for this woreda of 99,143, of whom 49,205 were men and 49,938 were women; 6,066 or 6.12% of its population were urban dwellers. The majority of the inhabitants with 97.88% of the population practised Ethiopian Orthodox Christianity, while 1.11% of the population practiced traditional beliefs.

Based on figures published by the Central Statistical Agency in 2005, this woreda has an estimated total population of 117,583, of whom 59,224 are men and 58,359 are women; 5,168 or 4.40% of its population are urban dwellers, which is less than the Zone average of 9.5%. With an estimated area of 674.85 square kilometers, Degem has an estimated population density of 174.2 people per square kilometer, which is greater than the Zone average of 143.

The 1994 national census reported a total population for this woreda of 84,718, of whom 42,297 were men and 42,421 women; 2,897 or 3.42% of its population were urban dwellers at the time. The largest ethnic groups reported in Degem was the Oromo (88.89%), followed by the Amhara (10.92%); all other ethnic groups made up 0.19% of the population. Oromo was spoken as a first language by 87.41%, and 12.55% spoke Amharic; the remaining 0.04% spoke all other primary languages reported. The majority of the inhabitants with 98.99% of population professed Ethiopian Orthodox Christianity, while 0.7% of the population were Protestant.
