= Kembibit =

District in Oromia Region, Ethiopia

Coordinates: 9°15′N 39°15′E

Kembibit is a woreda in Oromia Region, Ethiopia. Part of the Kaba Shewa Zone, Kembibit is bordered on the south by Berehna Aleltu, on the west by Wuchalena Jido, on the north by Abichuna Gne'a, and on the east by the Amhara Region. The administrative center of this woreda is Sheno; other towns in Kembibit include Hamus Gebeya and Kotu.

== Demographics ==
The 2007 national census reported a total population for this woreda of 74,276, of whom 36,989 were men and 37,287 were women; 11,799 or 15.89% of its population were urban dwellers. The majority of the inhabitants said they practised Ethiopian Orthodox Christianity, with 96.67% of the population reporting they practised that belief, and 2.55% were Muslim.

Based on figures published by the Central Statistical Agency in 2005, this woreda has an estimated total population of 109,933, of whom 55,508 are men and 54,425 are women; 12,212 or 11.11% of its population are urban dwellers, which is greater than the Zone average of 9.5%. With an estimated area of 861.26 square kilometers, Kembibit has an estimated population density of 127.6 people per square kilometer, which is less than the Zone average of 143.

=== 1994 national census ===
The 1994 national census reported a total population for this woreda of 77,967, of whom 38,773 were men and 39,194 women; 6,841 or 8.77% of its population were urban dwellers at the time. The three largest ethnic groups reported in Kembibit were the Oromo (70.03%), the Amhara (28.75%), and the Werji (1%); all other ethnic groups made up 0.22% of the population. Oromo was spoken as a first language by 70.95%, and 28.89% spoke Amharic; the remaining 0.38% spoke all other primary languages reported. The majority of the inhabitants professed Ethiopian Orthodox Christianity, with 97.91% of the population reporting they practiced that belief, while 1.89% of the population said they were Moslem.
