= Fetlework Gebregziabher =

Ethiopian politician

- ፈትለወርቅ ገብረእግዚኣብሄር
- President: Debretsion Gebremichael
- Preceded by: Debretsion Gebremichael

Deputy Chairwoman of Tigray People's Liberation Front
- Incumbent
- Assumed office 2020
- Preceded by: Debretsion Gebremichael

Ministry of Trade and Industry
- In office 16 October 2018 – 22 January 2020
- Preceded by: Ambachew Mekonnen
- Succeeded by: Melaku Abel

Personal details
- Born: 1960/1961
- Party: Tigray People's Liberation Front

Military service
- Allegiance: Tigray; Tigray People's Liberation Front
- Branch/service: Tigray People's Liberation Front; Tigray Defense Forces
- Battles/wars: Ethiopian Civil War; Tigray War

Fetlework Gebregziabher (Tigrinya: ፈትለወርቅ ገብረእግዚኣብሄር; nom de guerre Monjorino; born 1960 or 1961), is an Ethiopian politician from the Tigray Region and senior member of the Tigray People's Liberation Front (TPLF). Fetlework was the Ethiopian minister of trade and industry from October 2018 to January 2020.

== Early life ==
Fetlework joined the Tigray People's Liberation Front (TPLF) in 1979. She obtained her master's degree at the London School of Economics (LSE) in the early 2000s.

== Politics ==
After joining the TPLF in her childhood and studying at the LSE against the wishes of the TPLF leaders, Fetlework was elected to the TPLF Central Committee in 2006 and in 2010. She was elected as a member of the TPLF Executive Committee in 2015 and appointed to other senior TPLF positions during 2015–2017. In November 2017, Fetlework was elected as deputy chair of the TPLF, as the first woman to hold the position, and reelected in October 2018.

=== Minister ===
In Ethiopian prime minister Abiy Ahmed's October 2018 cabinet reshuffle, Fetlework was appointed Minister of Trade and Industry. She was replaced by Melaku Alebel in January 2020. Fetlework stated that she had not received any negative performance evaluations from either Abiy or the Cabinet. She interpreted her replacement as being motivated by the TPLF's refusal to join the Prosperity Party.
