= Aleltu =

District in Oromia Region, Ethiopia

- Woreda
- Location in Ethiopia
- Coordinates: 9°15′N 39°05′E
- Country: Ethiopia
- Regions: Oromia
- Zone: North Shewa

Population (2007)
  - Total: 53,414

Aleltu is one of the woredas in the Oromia Region of Ethiopia. It was part of former Bereh woreda. It is part of the North Shewa Zone. Towns located in this woreda include Tale, Bakkee, Digare, Sant'e and Galata. The closest major cities include Addis Ababa, Adama and Bishoftu.

== Demographics ==
The 2007 national census reported a total population for this woreda of 53,414, of whom 27,109 were men and 26,305 were women; 3,851 or 7.21% of its population were urban dwellers. The majority of the inhabitants said they practised Ethiopian Orthodox Christianity, with 99.15% of the population reporting they practised that belief, 0.75% were Muslim.
