= Sheno, Kembibit =

Town in Oromia Region, Ethiopia

Coordinates: 9°20′N 39°18′E

Sheno (Shanoo) is a town in central Ethiopia. Located in the Kaba Shewa Zone, Oromia, it has an elevation of 2,918 meters above sea level. It is the administrative center of Kembibit woreda. The main buildings in the city that can be shown is the new building built by a German philanthropist organization Menschen für Menschen. Older buildings that are serving as school and city administration were the remnants from the Italian camping site during the 5 years stay of the Italians.

Even though there were supporters of the Italians by then there were also many oromo patriots fighting the stay of the Italians as insurgent attacks with the bulga area arbegnoch

== Overview ==
=== North Shewa Oromiyaa Regional State ===
Local landmarks include the church of Kidus Mikael. During the Italian occupation, Sheno was the main Italian stronghold on the Addis Ababa - Asmara highway. This town was the setting of a meeting between the Italian occupiers and Ethiopian notables supporting the Italians (who included Leul Ras Seyum Mangasha, Nagadras Tasamma Estate, and Dejazmach Abba Woqaw) on 19 November 1939 with Abebe Aregai, who was one of the leading arbegnoch (the resistance fighters) fighting the Italians. The negotiations came to naught, and Abebe soon after returned to fighting the Italians.

Based on figures from the Central Statistical Agency in 2005, Sheno has an estimated total population of 9,654 of whom 4,543 were men and 5,111 were women. The 1994 census reported this town had a total population of 5,408 of whom 2,464 were men and 2,944 were women.

== Notable people ==
- Teferra Wolde-Semait, former Minister of Finance, Ethiopia
- Sileshi Sihin, Ethiopian long-distance runner
