= 2018 Ethiopian presidential election =

- 25 October 2018
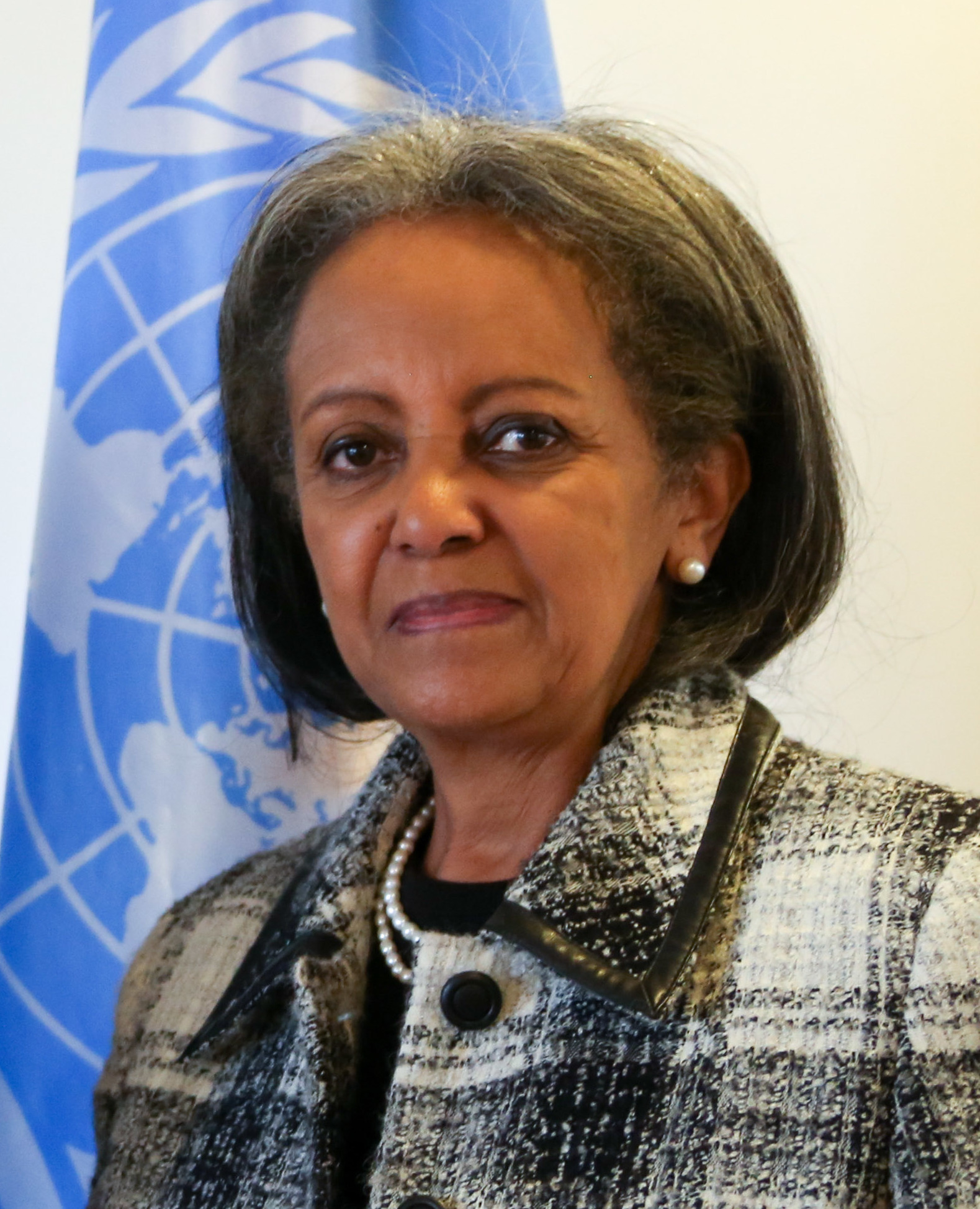
Nominee	Sahle-Work Zewde
Party	Independent
Electoral vote	659 (unanimous)
President before election
Mulatu Teshome
OPDO
Elected President
Sahle-Work Zewde
Independent

A snap presidential election was held in Ethiopia on 25 October 2018, prompted by the resignation of incumbent Mulatu Teshome. It was the fifth presidential election of the Federal Democratic Republic of Ethiopia to elect its fourth president.

Diplomat Sahle-Work Zewde was elected without contest to a six-year term, becoming Ethiopia's first non-royal female head of state and the first female head of state since the death of Empress Zewditu in 1930.

== Background and electoral process ==
As a parliamentary republic, most administrative power and the effective ability is vested in the prime minister and his government, rather than the president, leaving the president as primarily a figurehead executive. However, the president retains significant Reserve powers granted by the constitution.

A presidential candidate is required to be elected by a joint session of the upper house and lower house of the Ethiopian parliament, the Federal Parliamentary Assembly, the House of Federation and the House of Peoples' Representatives, respectively.

The outgoing president, Mulatu Teshome had been elected in 2013 to a six-year term ending in 2019, but resigned for unspecified reasons, necessitating an early election.
