= Ministry of Water, Irrigation and Electricity (Ethiopia) =

Government ministry of Ethiopia

- የውሃ፣ መስኖና ኤሌትሪክ ሚኒስቴር

Agency overview
- Formed: 2010; 16 years ago
- Jurisdiction: Ethiopian government
- Headquarters: Haile G/Silassie Avenue, Addis Ababa, Ethiopia
- Minister responsible: Abraham Belay (Minister of Irrigation and Lowlands) Habtamu Itefa (Ministry of Water and Energy)
- Website: mowe.gov.et

The Ministry of Water, Irrigation and Electricity (Amharic: የውሃ፣ መስኖና ኤሌትሪክ ሚኒስቴር) is an Ethiopian government department responsible for management of water resources, water supply and sanitation, irrigation and energy. It was established in 2010.

== Overview ==
The ministry was established in 2010. From 2021 to 2024, Aisha Mohammed was appointed by Prime Minister Abiy Ahmed as minister on 6 October 2021. On 20 May 2024, Abraham Belay succeeded as the minister while Aisha replaced his previous role of Defense Minister.

== List of ministers ==
- Seleshi Bekele (16 October 2018 – 6 October 2021)
- Aisha Mohammed (6 October 2021 – 20 May 2024)
- Abraham Belay (20 May 2024 – present). He serves under portfolio of Minister of Irrigation and Lowlands along with Habtamu Itefa, the Minister of Water and Energy.
