= Teferra Wolde-Semait =

Ethiopian economist (1938–2013)

- ተፈራ ወልደ ሰማዕት
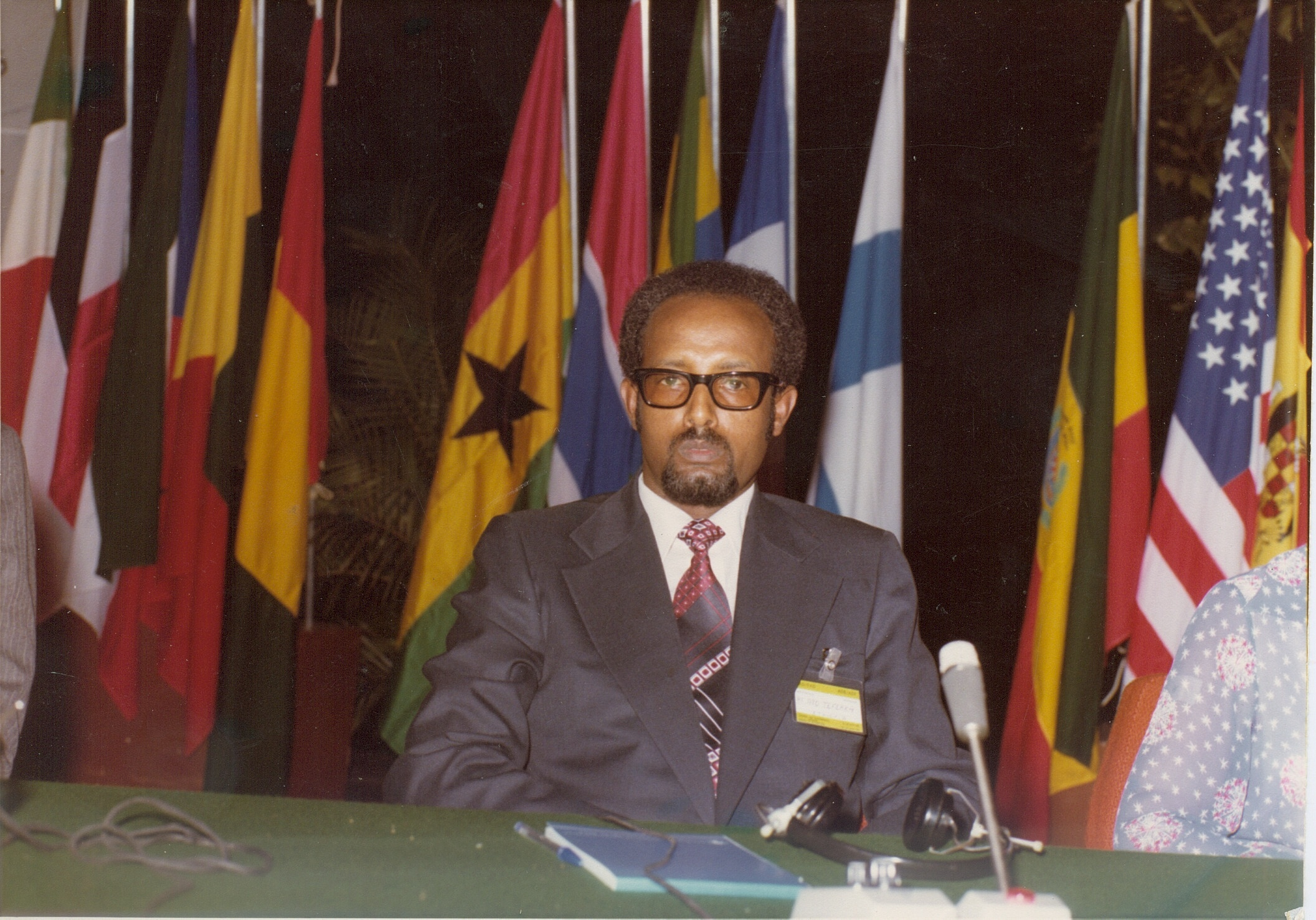

Minister of Finance
- In office 17 April 1976 – 1 September 1982
- President: Mengistu Haile Mariam
- Preceded by: Negash Desta
- Succeeded by: Tesfaye Dinka

Chairman of the Board of the National Bank of Ethiopia
- In office 1976–1982
- President: Mengistu Haile Mariam

Economic Consul of Washington, D.C.
- In office 1972–1974
- Monarch: Haile Selassie

Personal details
- Born: 11 September 1938 Shewa, Ethiopian Empire
- Died: 25 June 2013 (aged 74) Baltimore, Maryland, U.S.
- Education: Haile Selassie l University; International Institute of Social Studies

Teferra Wolde-Semait (Ge'ez: ተፈራ ወልደሰማዕት; 11 September 1938 – 25 June 2013) was an Ethiopian economist who has served as Minister of Finance, and chairman of the board of the National Bank of Ethiopia from 1977 to 1982.

== Early years ==
Teferra Wolde-Semait was born in Segele, a historic village located in the Kembibit district of Shewa, Ethiopia, on 11 September 1938. Segele is historically significant as the site of the Battle of Segale, fought on 27 October 1916, a decisive conflict in Ethiopian history that resulted in the defeat of Negus Mikael of Wollo and helped secure the reign of Empress Zewditu and the regency of Ras Tafari Makonnen, the future Emperor Haile Selassie I.

His mother was Jemanesh Bedane and his father was Yaee (Woldesemait) Maremi, an ‘’arbegna’’ (Ethiopian patriot and resistance fighter) who fought against Italian forces during the Italian occupation of Ethiopia (1936–1941). He was the youngest of five children, the others being Tegegn, Bekele, Tirunesh and Zenebech. Shortly after Teferra’s birth, his father was killed in battle while resisting the Italian occupation, prompting Jemanesh to flee the area with her children.

Both of his parents were buried at St. Kidus Merkoriyos Church in Segele, alongside Fitawrari Meshesha and other Ethiopian patriots (’‘arbenoch’’) associated with the historic Battle of Segale.

Teferra was brought to Addis Ababa at an early age, where he entered Priest School and subsequently Haile Selassie I Kokebe Tsebha School, completing 1st through 12th grade with acceleration. After teaching in Wollo for a year, he attended Haile Selassie l University in Addis Ababa and graduated in 1964 with distinction, earning a bachelor's degree in economics. After graduating, he was hired at the Ministry of Community Development and Social Affairs. After working for some years, he travelled to The Hague, Netherlands, to pursue an advanced degree, and obtained a master's degree in Economic Development in 1967 from the International Institute of Social Studies.

== Career ==
Teferra returned to the Ethiopian Ministry of Community Development and Social Affairs, where he formed and managed the planning unit. He spent the years from 1967 to 1971 preparing Ethiopia's long-term development plan as well as the annual budget for the Ministry. He then transferred to the Ministry of Finance, and, from 1972 to 1974, worked in the Embassy of Ethiopia in Washington, D.C. as Counselor of Economics and Finance. While in that role, he worked closely with the World Bank, International Monetary Fund (IMF), USAID, and other organizations to boost the aid being given to Ethiopia.

Afterwards, he returned to Addis Ababa to manage the Lending and Investment Management unit of the Ministry of Finance where from 1974 to 1975 he worked on foreign assistance as well as government investments in various public enterprises. Teferra became vice president from 1975 to 1976, and then from 1977 to 1982, Ethiopia's 9th Minister of Finance. While in his position he implemented changes such as reorganizing the Ministry's various departments. Those changes led the way to increased revenue as well as improved budget delivery services, and also resulted in Ethiopia obtaining development aid and loans from international organizations such as the World Bank, African Development Bank, and other countries. At a time when his Government was under international scrutiny, Teferra worked to maintain economic relations with Ethiopia's allies with the aim to preserve Ethiopia's economic interest without pursuing political acceptance.

Teferra was the chairman of the board of the National Bank of Ethiopia during his years as Minister of Finance, effectively making him the country's overall Monetary and Finance chief. In addition to the above-mentioned job responsibilities, Teferra served as a board member in the National Planning Commission, Economy and Law committees, Telecommunications, National Coffee, Cattle Breeding and Beef, and Ethiopian Airlines committees. In 1982, Teferra resigned from his job and took his family to the United States. This was considered a prominent defection from the Derg at the time. He was employed by the International Monetary Fund (IMF) in Washington, D.C. and worked under several assignments until retirement in 2003 as Planning and Budget Senior Professional.

== Death ==
While undergoing treatment at Johns Hopkins Hospital in Baltimore, Maryland, Teferra died on 25 June 2013 at the age of 74. He was the father of three children and the grandfather of three grandchildren.

=== Achievements ===
- Assigned at the Overseas Development Counsel in Washington, DC, USA, from 1982 to 1983 where he conducted research on development growth in sub-Saharan African countries
- Assignment with the International Monetary Fund as Research Advisor to the Swaziland Government's Central Bank from 1984 to 1987
- Advisor with the World Bank on African Public Enterprises and studies on work execution and improvement
- Assigned by the International Monetary Fund to other central banks' policy and operations sections where he consulted on how to strengthen the banks' capacity through research and study
- International Monetary Fund and United Nations Development Programme (UNDP) coordinating technical assistance being given to the Namibian government and served as a Senior Consultant to the Namibian government's Ministry of Finance

== Additional sources ==
- "Conference of Ministers of African Least Developed Countries" (PDF). United Nations Economic Commission For Africa.
- "UK/ETHIOPIA AIR TRANSPORT PROFITS AGREEMENT" (PDF). Her Majesty's Revenue and Customs (HMRC). Archived from the original (PDF) on 6 June 2013.
- "Africa's Public Enterprise Sector and Evidence of Reforms" (PDF). World Bank.
- Transformation and Continuity in Revolutionary Ethiopia. Christopher Clapham. 25 October 1990. ISBN 9780521396509.
- "Agreement on products within the province of the European Coal and Steel Community". European Union (EU).

== Works ==
- Economic Study on Gambia, Lesotho, Malawi, and Sudan (1981)
- Development Policies of Sub-Saharan African countries (1983)
- Adjustment Policies of African countries Based on Ethiopia's experience
- Africa’s Public Enterprise Sector and Evidence of Reforms (1989)
- About SADCC member countries (የሞኒተር ውህደት/ ህብረት)
- About Namibia's Fiscal Policy (1995)
