= Gerba Guracha =

Town in Oromia Region, Ethiopia

Gerba Guracha Garba Gurraachaa
- Town
- Nickname: Kuyyu
- Location within Ethiopia
- Coordinates: 9°48′N 38°24′E
- Country: Ethiopia
- Region: Oromia
- Zone: North Shewa /Selale
- Woreda: Kuyu

Population (2005)
  - Total: 19,830
- Time zone: UTC+3 (EAT)

Gerba Guracha (Oromo: Garba Gurraachaa) is a transit town in central Ethiopia. Located in the North Shewa Zone of Oromia Region, Ethiopia, it is an inland port city in Selale. It has a latitude and longitude of 9°48′N 38°24′E and an elevation between 2,515 and 2,547 meters above sea level. It is the administrative center of Kuyu woreda.

This town has had telephone service at least as early as 1967 and a primary school in 1955.

C.F. Rey mentions passing through Gerba Guracha (which he describes it as a village) in January 1927. Records at the Nordic Africa Institute website provide details of a primary school there in 1968.

== Demographics ==
Based on figures from the Central Statistical Agency in 2005, Gebra Guracha has an estimated total population of 19,830 of whom 9,184 were males and 10,646 were females. The 1994 national census reported this town had a total population of 11,113 of whom 4,981 were males and 6,132 were females.
