= Ministry of Trade and Industry (Ethiopia) =

Government ministry of Ethiopia

- የንግድና የኢንዱስትሪ ሚኒስቴር

Agency overview
- Formed: August 1995; 31 years ago
- Jurisdiction: Ethiopian government
- Headquarters: Addis Ababa, Ethiopia
- Minister responsible: Kassahun Gofe, Minister of Trade and Regional Integration
- Website: iaip.gov.et/industry/

The Ministry of Trade and Industry (Amharic: የኢትዮጵያ የንግድና የኢንዱስትሪ ሚኒስቴር) is an Ethiopian government department responsible for the oversight of the national trade and industry sectors in Ethiopia.

== History ==
The Ministry of Trade and Industry was established in August 1995 with the Proclamation No.4/1995 for assignation of powers to the executive organs of the Federal Democratic Republic of Ethiopia. It was reorganized by with proclamation No 619/2003 to amend the Proclamation No 256/2001 structure, with the ministry has power to oversee five government institutions that are responsible for encouraging and developing trade, industry and investments activities.

The ministry has given to perform main tasks like encourages and register to chamber of commerce and sectorial associates including consumer association. Under Chambers of Commerce and Sectorial Association Establishment Proclamation No.341/2003, the ministry has also task to strengthen the association that previously established.

== List of ministers ==
- Ambachew Mekonnen (19 April 2018 – 22 October 2018)
- Fetlework Gebregziabher (16 October 2018 – 22 January 2020)
- Melaku Alebel (22 January 2020 – 5 October 2021)
- Gebremeskel Chala (6 October 2021 – 28 June 2024)
- Kassahun Gofe (3 July 2024 – present)
