= Bereh =

District in Oromia Region, Ethiopia

Coordinates: 9°05′N 39°00′E

Berek (Oromo: Barihee) is a woreda or district in Oromia Region, Ethiopia. It was part of the former Berek Aleltu woreda which was separated for Aleltu and Berek woredas and Sendafa Town. Part of the Oromia Special Zone Surrounding Finfinne, Berek is bordered on the south by the Akaki and East Shewa Zone, on the southwest by the city of Addis Ababa, on the west by Sululta, on the north by North Shewa Zone, and on the east by the Amhara Region.

The landscape of this woreda has been described as undulating mountains covered by a scattered settlement pattern, which make development efforts more difficult.

This woreda was selected as one of the three areas for Agri-Service Ethiopia to implement an Integrated Food Security Program. This Program operates in 12 of the woreda's kebeles, with the goal of improving agricultural practices, developing new rural water sources, conserving use of local natural resources, training community health workers and building new schools.

== Demographics ==
The 2007 national census reported this woreda's population as 80,808, of whom 41,023 were men and 39,785 women; none of its population were urban dwellers. The majority of the inhabitants (94.97%) said they practised Ethiopian Orthodox Christianity, 2.69% were Muslim, and 1.82% practiced traditional beliefs.

Based on figures published by the Central Statistical Agency in 2005, Berehna Aleltu had an estimated total population of 170,360, of whom 85,341 were men and 85,019 women; 17,362 or 10.19% of its population were urban dwellers, which is greater than the Zone average of 9.5%. With an estimated area of 1,325.79 square kilometers, Berehna Aleltu had an estimated population density of 128.5 people per square kilometer, which is less than the Zone average of 143.

The 1994 national census reported a total population for this woreda of 121,081, of whom 60,680 were men and 60,401 women; 9,718 or 8.03% of its population were urban dwellers at the time. The three largest ethnic groups reported in Berehna Aleltu were the Oromo (83.15%), the Amhara (14.04%), and the Werji (1.79%); all other ethnic groups made up 1.02% of the population. Oromo was spoken as a first language by 84.62%, and 14.98% spoke Amharic; the remaining 0.4% spoke all other primary languages reported. The majority of the inhabitants professed Ethiopian Orthodox Christianity, with 96.84% of the population reporting they practiced that belief, while 2.81% of the population said they were Muslim.
