= List of advisors of Prime Minister of Ethiopia =

The following is list of advisors to the Prime Minister of Ethiopia, a senior official whose primary function is to guide policy matters, strategic decisions, and administrative functions.

== List ==
Name	Term start	Term end	Portfilos	Ref.
Daniel Kibret	23 June 2018	Incumbent	Social Affairs	
Teklewold Atnafu	2020	Incumbent	Financial and Economic Affairs	
Seleshi Bekele	7 October 2021	Incumbent	Grand Ethiopian Renaissance Dam affairs	
Getachew Reda	11 April 2025	Incumbent	East African Affairs (with the rank of Minister)	
Kenea Yadeta	13 June 2026	Incumbent	National Security Advisor (with the rank of Minister)	
Taye Atske Selassie	18 January 2023	8 February 2024	Foreign Policy (with the rank of Minister)	
Gedu Andargachew	4 November 2020	9 June 2022	National Security Advisor	
Redwan Hussein	9 June 2022	8 February 2024	National Security Advisor	
