= International Association of Libraries and Museums of the Performing Arts =

Organization

The International Association of Libraries and Museums of the Performing Arts (French: Société Internationale des Bibliothèques et des Musées des Arts du Spectacle, abbreviated SIBMAS), promotes practical and theoretical research in the documentation of performing arts. The association was founded in 1954, and has organized biennial international conferences since then, primarily in European cities.

Spread across 35 countries around the world, it gathers individuals and institutions documenting circus, dance, film, opera, theatre and puppetry.

The association is governed by a 16-member international executive committee.

The association is also concerned with ensuring the proper conservation of the performing arts collections. At the beginning of 2021 it expressed its concern about the Victoria & Albert Museum's (V&A) intention to close the Department of Theatre and Performance. SIBMAS set up a petition and a press campaign to save the department and ask for the V&A to have a consultation with SIBMAS & the industry it serves.

== What does SIBMAS do? ==
It promotes research in the performing arts, facilitates networking among the members and share resources about their specific collections and the performing arts in general:

- Conferences: SIBMAS organises biennial conferences focusing on challenges and recent developments of current practical interest for the members
- Networking: SIBMAS encourages genuine collaboration and invests in spreading best practice between its members
- Newsletter: a quarterly newsletter, providing up-to-date news and information about the activities of SIBMAS and the members
- International Directory of Performing Arts: a database with detailed information about performing arts collections, searchable by organization name and/or category of member institution ranging from national libraries to puppet museums
- Proceedings: SIBMAS provides print editions of the conference papers of our conferences
