= Ministry of Urban Development and Construction (Ethiopia) =

Government ministry of Ethiopia

- የከተማ ልማትና ኮንስትራክሽን ሚኒስቴር

Agency overview
- Formed: October 2005; 19 years ago
- Jurisdiction: Ethiopian government
- Headquarters: Addis Ababa, Ethiopia
- Minister responsible: Chaltu Sani

The Ministry of Urban Development and Construction (Amharic: የከተማ ልማትና ኮንስትራክሽን ሚኒስቴር) is an Ethiopian government department responsible for urban development and construction works. It was established in October 2005 by Proclamation No. 471/2005.

== Background ==
The ministry was established under Proclamation No. 471/2005 in October 2005. The Proclamation defines its objectives and functions;

- to formulate and implement policies, strategies, plans and programs that promotes urban development and construction activities.
- to provide technical and capacity building support to regional and municipality and other stakeholders in the sector.
- to coordinate and monitor urban developmental activities, projects and programs at the federal level.
- to regulate and supervise the industry and quality assurance.
- to allow participation from civil society or private sectors.
- to enhance urban and construction model by conducting periodical research and studies.

Chaltu Sani is the current minister as urban and infrastructure since 2021.
