= Taye Atske Selassie =

President of Ethiopia since 2024

- ታዬ አጽቀሥላሴ
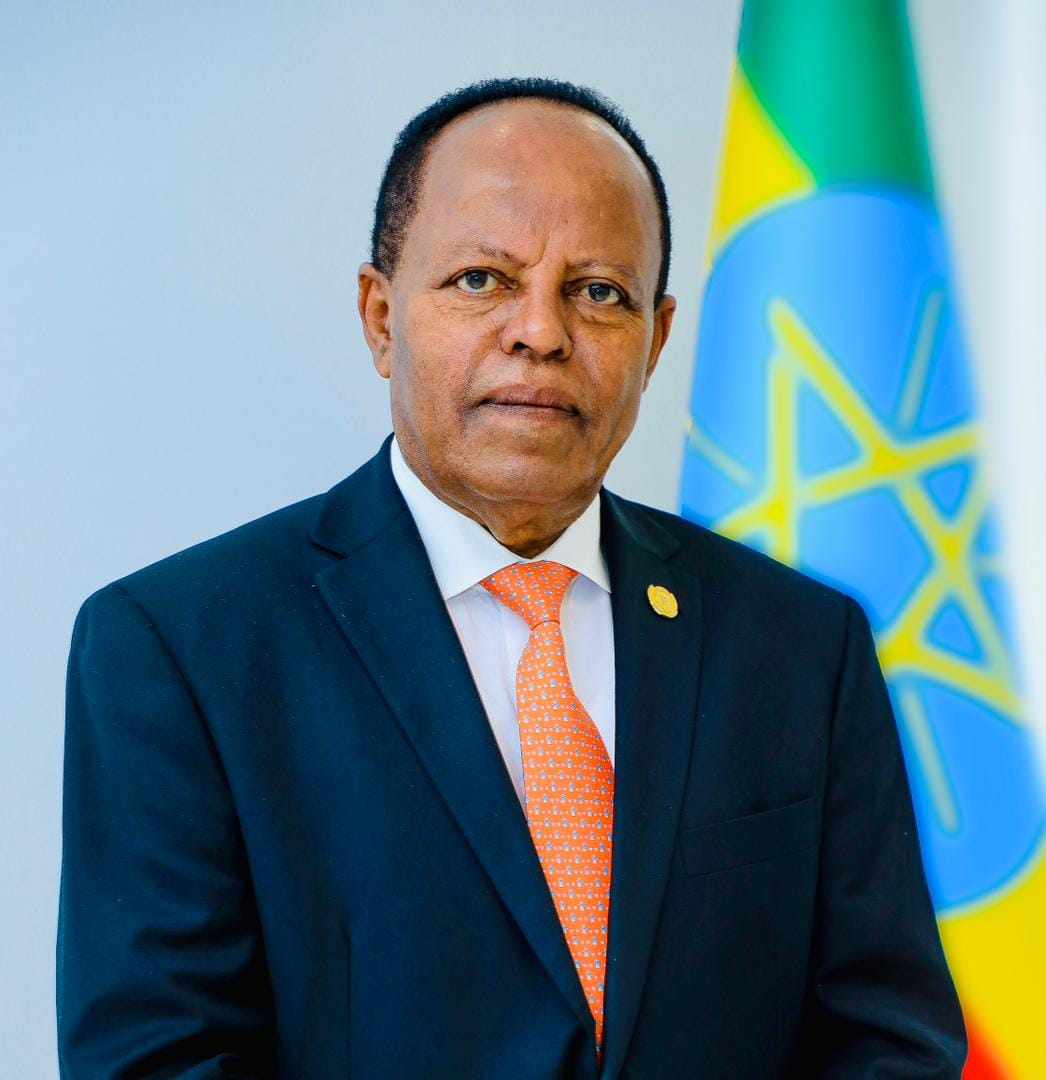
- Official portrait, 2024

President of Ethiopia
- Incumbent
- Assumed office 7 October 2024
- Prime Minister: Abiy Ahmed
- Preceded by: Sahle-Work Zewde

Minister of Foreign Affairs
- In office 8 February 2024 – 7 October 2024
- Prime Minister: Abiy Ahmed
- Preceded by: Demeke Mekonnen
- Succeeded by: Gedion Timotheos

Foreign Affairs Advisor to the Prime Minister
- In office 18 January 2023 – 8 February 2024
- Prime Minister: Abiy Ahmed

Personal details
- Born: 13 January 1956 (age 70) Debarq, Begemder Province, Ethiopian Empire
- Education: Addis Ababa University; Lancaster University
- Occupation: Diplomat

Taye Atske Selassie Amde (Amharic: ታዬ አጽቀሥላሴ, born 13 January 1956) is an Ethiopian diplomat and politician who has served as the president of Ethiopia since 2024. Prior to his presidency, he served in multiple diplomatic roles, including ambassador to Egypt and permanent representative to the United Nations, and as minister of foreign affairs.

== Early life and education ==
Taye Atske Selassie Amde was born in Debarq, Gondar. He graduated from Addis Ababa University with a Bachelor of Arts degree in Political Science and International Relations and a Master of Arts degree in International Relations and Strategic Studies from Lancaster University in 1989.

== Career ==
In the Ministry of Foreign Affairs, Taye was a consultant in the European Department, head of the Western Europe Department, and acting Director of Information. He was Minister Counsellor at the Ethiopian embassy in Washington D.C. and consul general in Los Angeles from October 2002 to November 2010. From 2017 to 2018, he served as Ethiopia's ambassador to Egypt. In 2018, he became Permanent representative to the United Nations for Ethiopia. He was critical of a report by the International Commission of Human Rights Experts on Ethiopia detailing atrocities committed by Ethiopia in the Tigray war.

Demeke Mekonnen, the Minister of Foreign Affairs, resigned on 26 January 2024, and Taye was selected to replace him on 8 February. He led indirect negotiations with Somalia through Turkey about Ethiopia leasing 20 kilometres of coastline from Somaliland in exchange for diplomatic recognition.

== Presidency ==
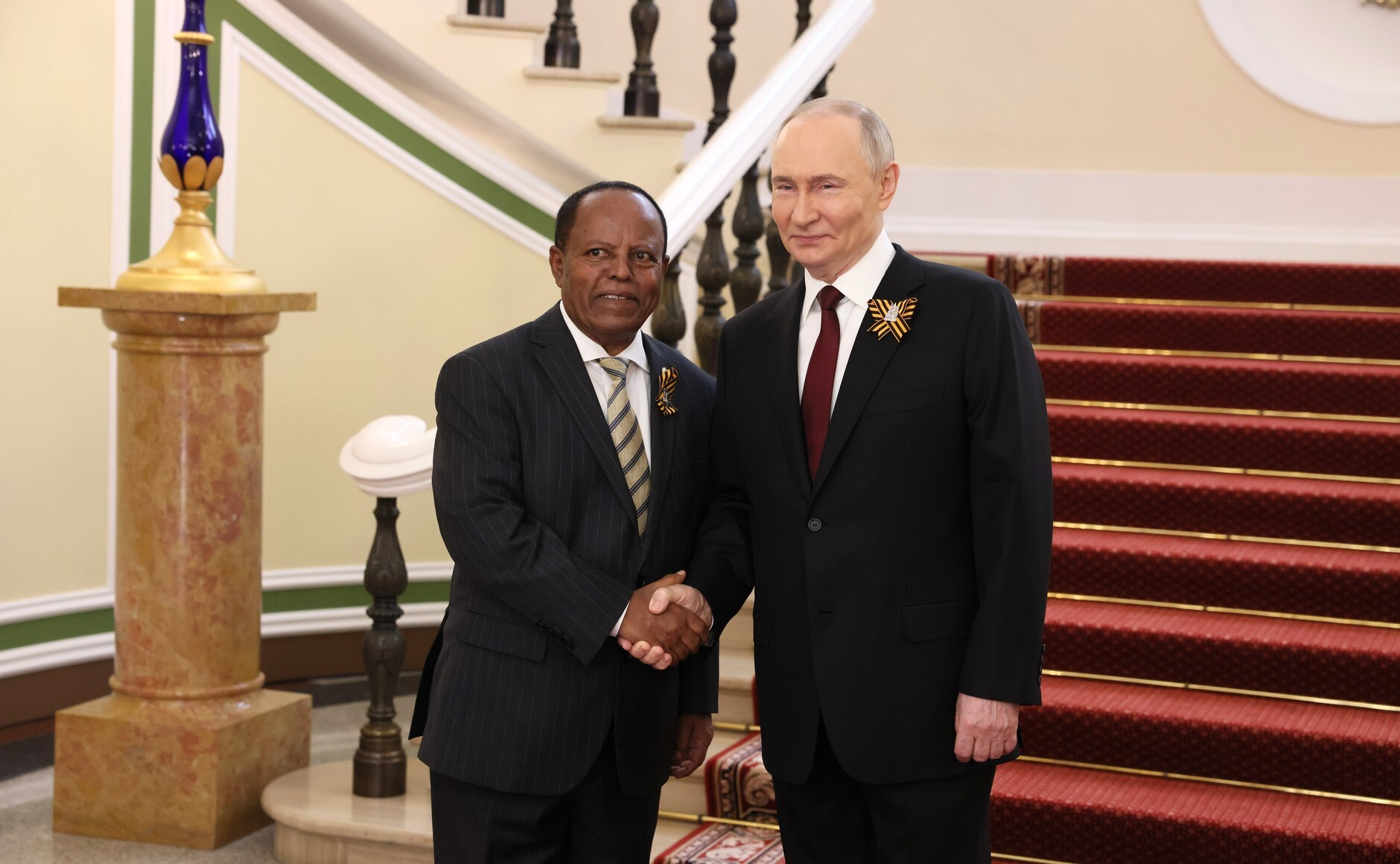
Selassie with Russian President Vladimir Putin in Moscow, Russia on 9 May 2025

President Sahle-Work Zewde was removed from her position after allegedly falling out with Prime Minister Abiy Ahmed. On 7 October 2024, Taye was sworn in as President of Ethiopia. Taye is an ally of Ahmed.

In May 2025, Taye visited Moscow to attend the 80th Anniversary of Victory Day at the invitation of Russian President Vladimir Putin.

== Works cited ==
=== News ===
- Besheer, Margaret (28 October 2022). "UN Rights Experts Warn Atrocities Will Grow in Ethiopia's Tigray Without Peace". Voice of America. Archived from the original on 21 June 2025.
- Maruf, Harun (13 August 2024). "Talks end without agreement about Ethiopia's coastline access via Somaliland". Voice of America. Archived from the original on 21 June 2025.
- Schwikowski, Martina (9 October 2024). "Ethiopia: New president signals willingness to dialogue". Deutsche Welle. Archived from the original on 21 June 2025.
- Yibeltal, Kalkidan (7 October 2024). "Ethiopia president replaced after falling out with PM". BBC. Archived from the original on 21 June 2025.

=== Web ===
- "H.E Taye ATSKE-SELASSIE". Africa CEO Forum. Archived from the original on 21 June 2025.
- "H.E. Mr. Taye Atske Selassie Amde" (PDF). UNICEF. Archived (PDF) from the original on 4 April 2025.
- "New Permanent Representative of Ethiopia Presents Credentials". United Nations. 10 September 2018. Archived from the original on 21 June 2025.

Political offices
| Preceded by Sahle-Work Zewde | President of Ethiopia; 2024–present | Incumbent |
