= Sahle-Work Zewde =

President of Ethiopia from 2018 to 2024

Her Excellency Sahle-Work Zewde
- ሣህለ ወርቅ ዘውዴ
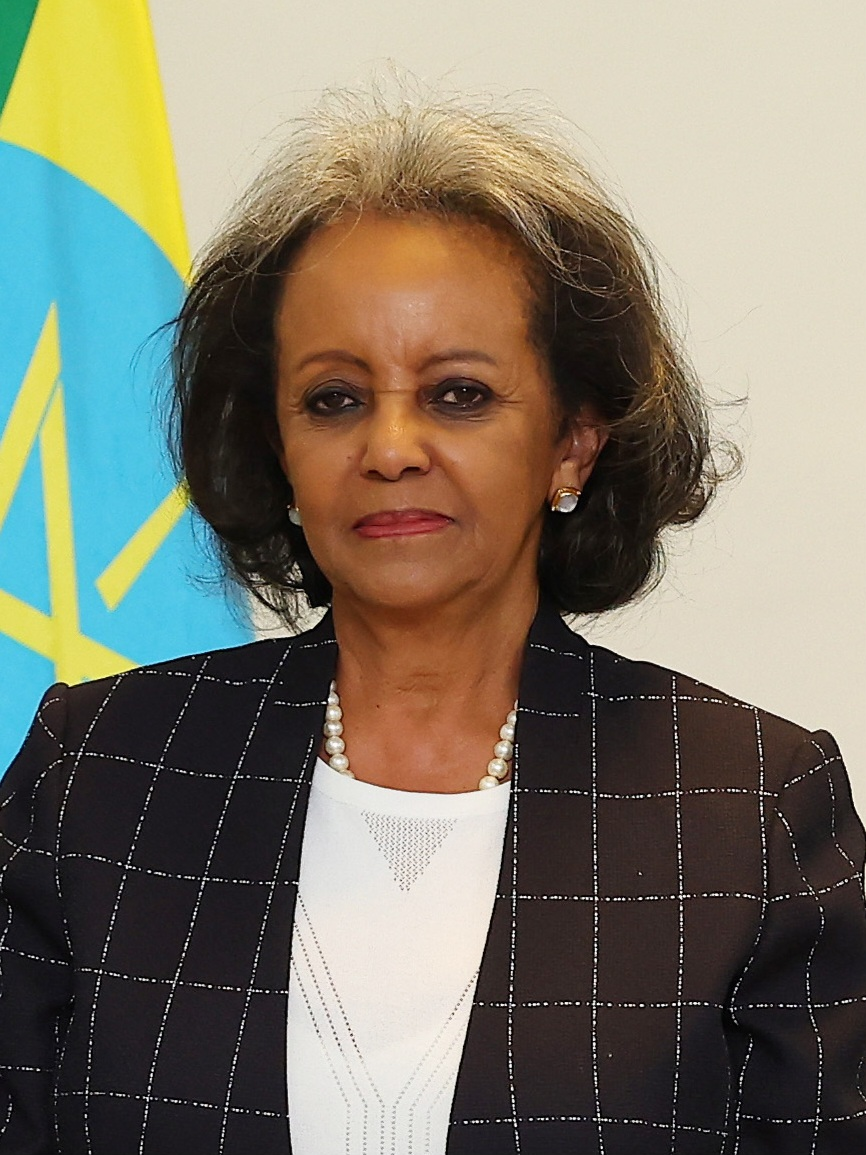
- Sahle-Work in 2022

President of Ethiopia
- In office 25 October 2018 – 7 October 2024
- Prime Minister: Abiy Ahmed
- Preceded by: Mulatu Teshome
- Succeeded by: Taye Atske Selassie

Under Secretary-General, Head of the United Nations Office to the African Union
- In office 27 June 2018 – 25 October 2018
- Appointed by: António Guterres
- Preceded by: Haile Menkerios
- Succeeded by: Hanna Tetteh

Director-General of the United Nations Office at Nairobi
- In office 2011–2018
- Appointed by: Ban Ki-moon; António Guterres
- Preceded by: Achim Steiner
- Succeeded by: Hanna Tetteh

Ambassador to Senegal with accreditation to Mali, Cape Verde, Guinea-Bissau, Gambia and Guinea
- In office 1989–1993
- President: Mengistu Haile-Mariam; Tesfaye Gebre Kidan; Meles Zenawi

Personal details
- Born: 21 February 1950 (age 76) Addis Ababa, Ethiopian Empire
- Party: Independent
- Education: University of Montpellier

Sahle-Work Zewde (Amharic: ሣህለ ወርቅ ዘውዴ; born 21 February 1950) is an Ethiopian diplomat who served as president of Ethiopia from 2018 to 2024, the first woman to hold the office. She was elected as president unanimously by members of the Federal Parliamentary Assembly on 25 October 2018.

American business magazine Forbes, on its annual edition of the Forbes list of The World's 100 Most Powerful Women, listed Sahle-Work as the 93rd most powerful woman in the world, making her the highest-ranking African woman on the list.

== Early life and education ==
Born in Addis Ababa, She is the first born out of four children. She attended primary and secondary school at Lycée Guebre-Mariam in Addis Ababa, after which she studied natural science at the University of Montpellier, France. She is fluent in Amharic, French, and English.

== Career ==
=== Diplomatic career ===
Sahle-Work was only the second woman to be appointed an ambassador in Ethiopian history (ambassador Yodit Emiru was the first woman to hold an ambassadorship). She served as the ambassador of both the communist People's Democratic Republic of Ethiopia and post-civil war Transitional Government of Ethiopia.

A veteran in the Ethiopian foreign service, Sahle-Work served as Ambassador to Senegal, with accreditation to Mali, Cape Verde, Guinea-Bissau, Gambia and Guinea, from 1989 to 1993. From 1993 to 2002, she was Ambassador to Djibouti and Permanent Representative to the Intergovernmental Authority on Development (IGAD). This was a prominent position, as Djibouti was the landlocked country's primary route to sea trade. Her involvement here gave her experience in trade issues. She held this position until 2002. She later served as Ambassador to France, Permanent Representative to the United Nations Educational, Scientific and Cultural Organization (UNESCO) and was accredited to Tunisia and Morocco from 2002 to 2006.

Sahle-Work subsequently held other high level positions including Permanent Representative of Ethiopia to the African Union and the United Nations Economic Commission for Africa (ECA) and Director-General for African Affairs in the Ministry of Foreign Affairs of Ethiopia.

=== Career with the United Nations ===
Until 2011, Sahle-Work served as Special Representative of United Nations Secretary-General Ban Ki-moon and Head of the United Nations Integrated Peace-building Office in the Central African Republic (BINUCA).

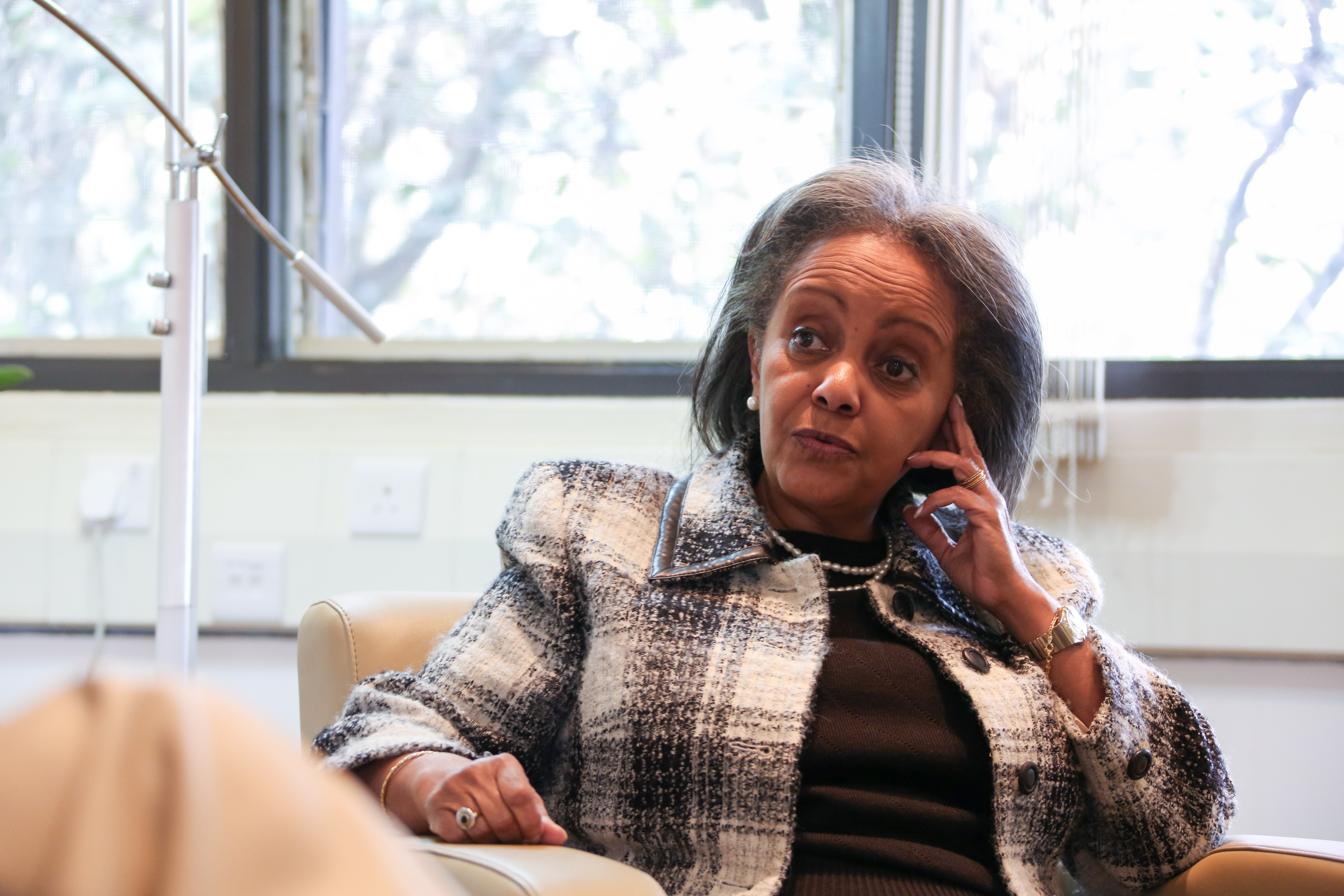
Sahle-Work during interview in Nairobi, 2016

In 2011, Ban appointed Sahle-Work as Director-General of the United Nations Office at Nairobi (UNON). Under Sahle-Work, the Nairobi office became a more important UN hub for East and Central Africa, according to the 2012 Africa Yearbook.

In June 2018, Secretary-General António Guterres appointed Sahle-Work as his Special Representative to the African Union and Head of the United Nations Office to the African Union (UNOAU) at the level of Under-Secretary-General of the United Nations. She was the first woman to hold the post. By this time, it was expected that Sahle-Work was preparing to retire.

=== President of Ethiopia ===
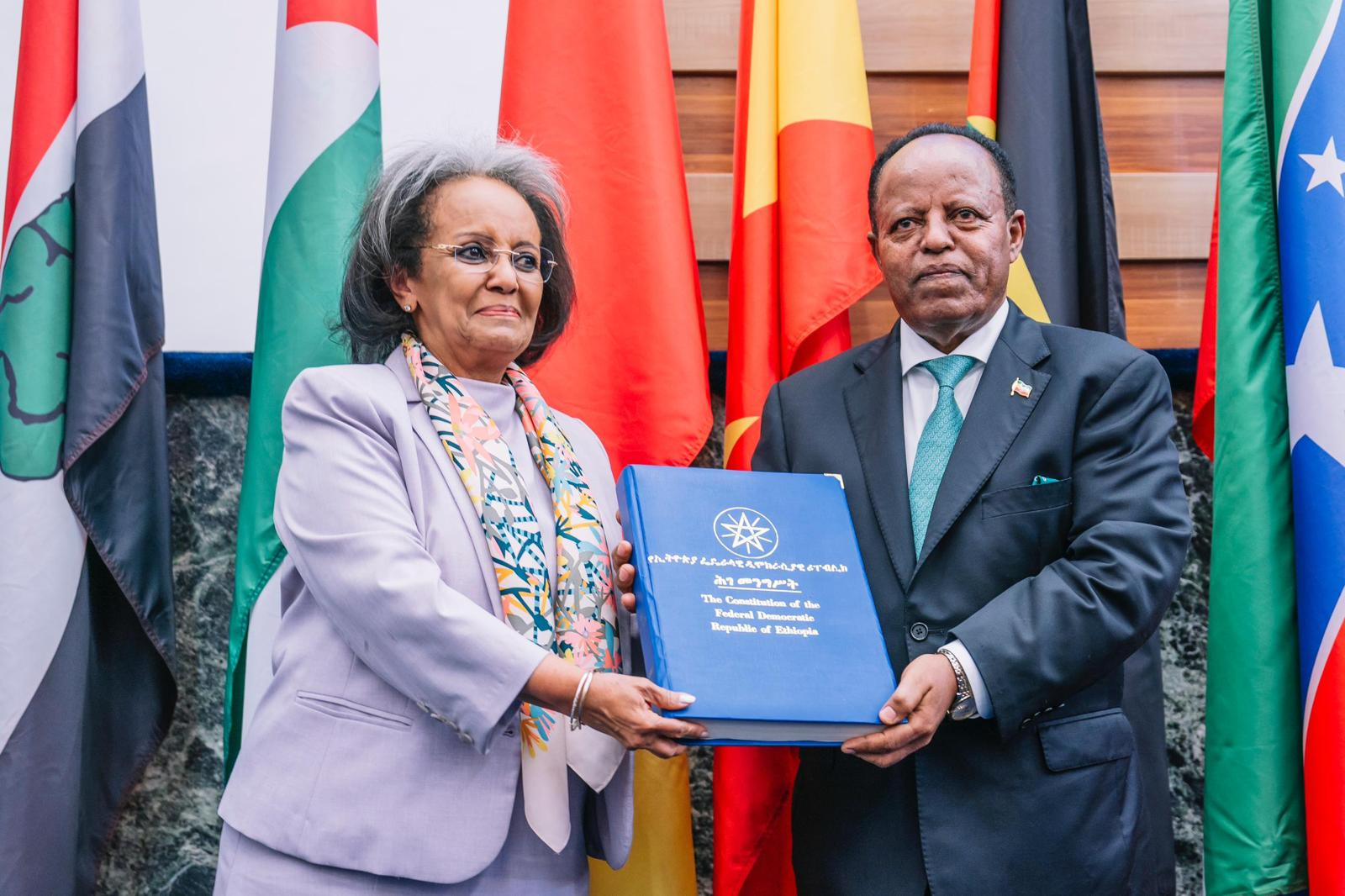
Sahle Work giving Taye Atske Selassie, the newly elected president, the constitution

President Mulatu Teshome resigned suddenly on 24 October 2018, and Prime Minister Abiy Ahmed chose Sahle-Work as Teshome's successor. This appointment was one of several by Abiy to seek gender equality on the government, as he believed that this was a step toward eliminating discrimination in society. Sahle-Work's appointment as president of Ethiopia was unanimously approved by the Federal Parliamentary Assembly on 25 October. She was the first woman to serve in the role and the fourth president since the ruling Ethiopian People's Revolutionary Democratic Front (EPRDF) coalition was elected in the newly established Federal Democratic Republic of Ethiopia in 1995. She is expected to serve two six-year terms.

Prior to her presidency, Sahle-Work had no experience in domestic politics. Although her role is largely ceremonial (with most executive power lying with the prime minister), Sahle-Work's election made her Ethiopia's first female head of state since Empress Zewditu. At the time she was appointed, Sahle-Work was the only female head of state in Africa, and by 2021, she was one of two alongside Samia Suluhu of Tanzania.

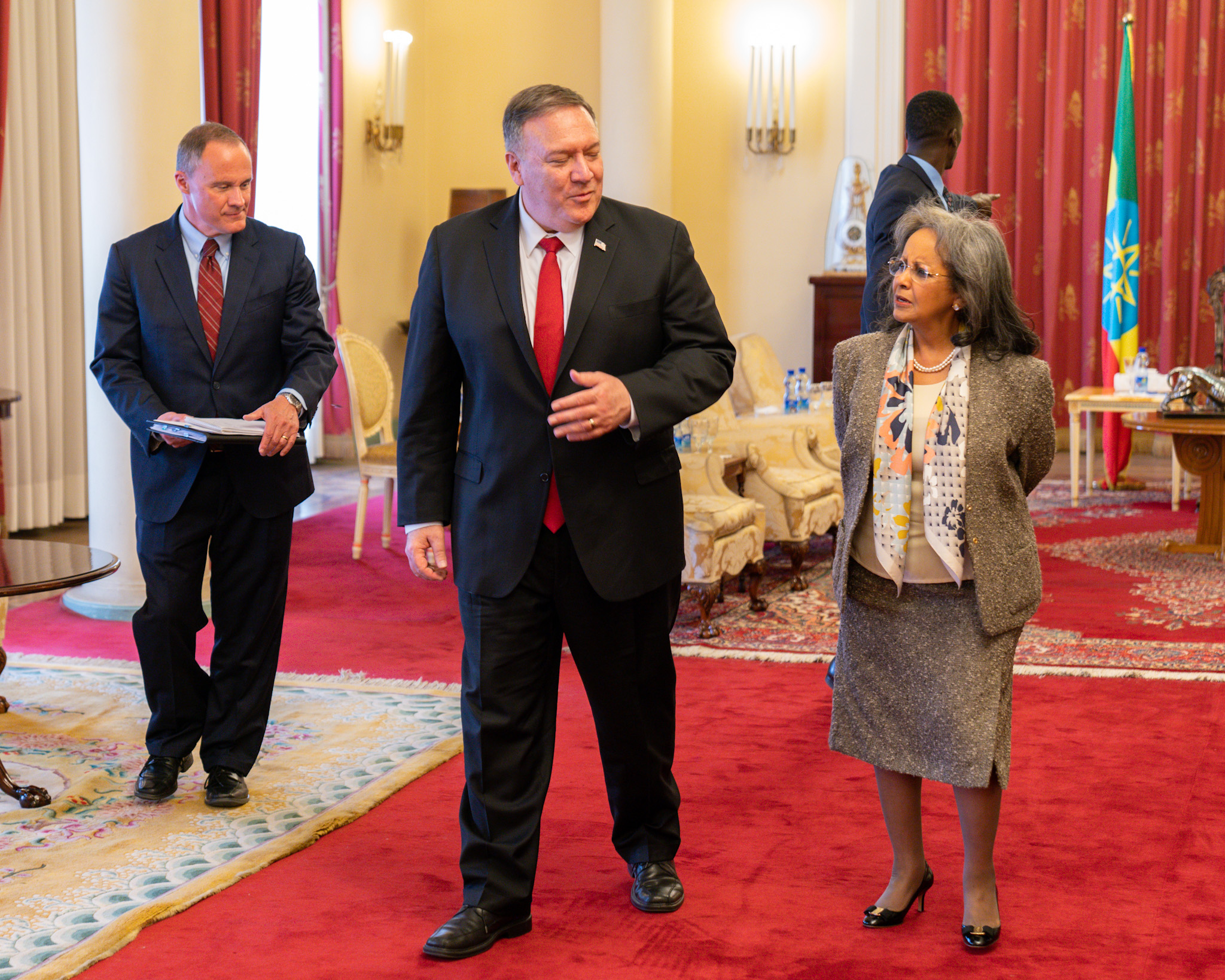
Sahle-Work meeting with U.S. Secretary of State Mike Pompeo in February 2020

On 25 March 2020, Sahle-Work announced on Twitter that she has pardoned more than 4,000 prisoners in a move to curb the spread of the COVID-19 pandemic in Ethiopia. She also pardoned more than 1,500 prisoners on 2 April 2020.

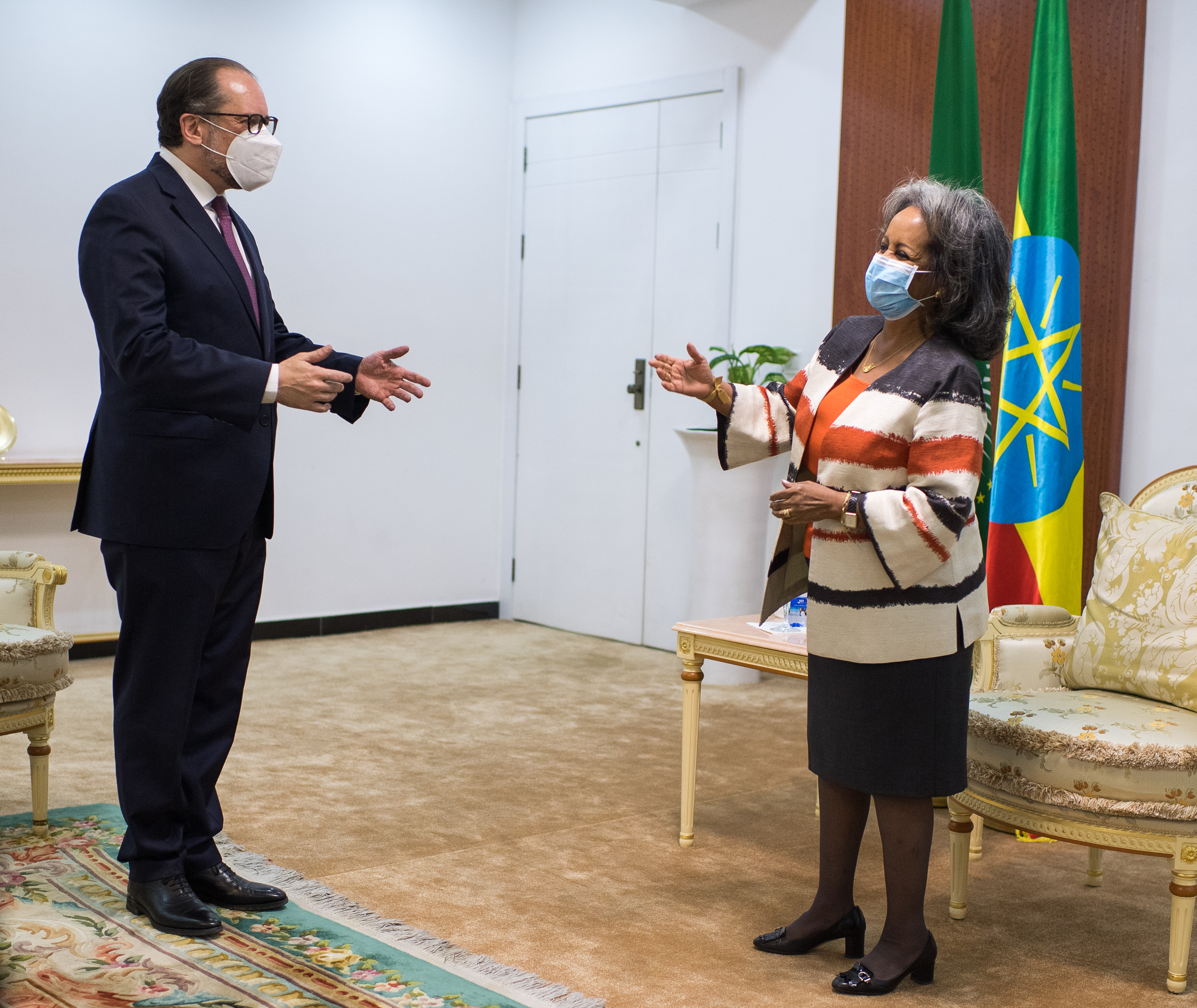
Sahle-Work meeting with Foreign Minister of Austria Alexander Schallenberg in January 2021

On 19 December 2020, Sahle-Work commuted the death sentences of former Derg officials Berhanu Bayeh and Adis Tedla to life imprisonment. They had been granted safe haven in the Italian embassy soon after the Derg regime's collapse in 1991 and had been living there ever since. Italy refused to give them up because of its long-standing opposition to capital punishment. Berhanu and Adis had been sentenced in absentia to death in 2008, but were subsequently granted parole on 24 December.

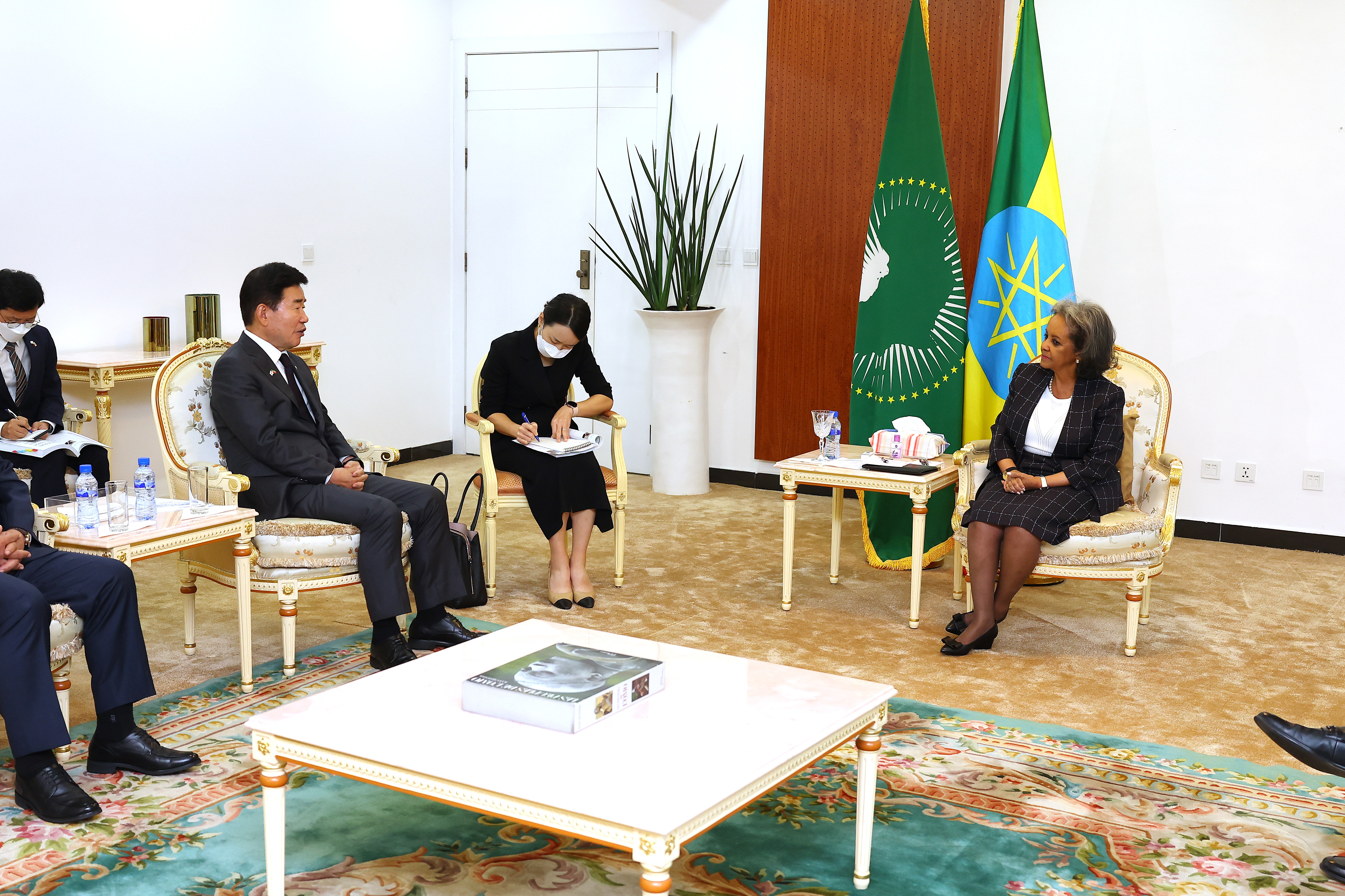
Sahle-Work meeting with Speaker of the National Assembly of South Korea Kim Jin-pyo in October 2022

Sahle-Work demanded an end to the Tigray War between the Ethiopian government and the Tigray People's Liberation Front (TPLF) through "negotiations without any conditions", though she also supported countering TPLF attacks "with the necessary measures".

Political offices
Preceded by Mulatu Teshome	President of Ethiopia; 2018–2024	Succeeded by Taye Atske Selassie
