= North Shewa Zone (Oromia) =

Zone in Oromia Region of Ethiopia

Coordinates: 9°30′N 38°40′E

North Shewa Zone: Shawaa Kaabaa (Oromo); ሰሜን ሸዋ (Amharic)
- Zone
- Flag

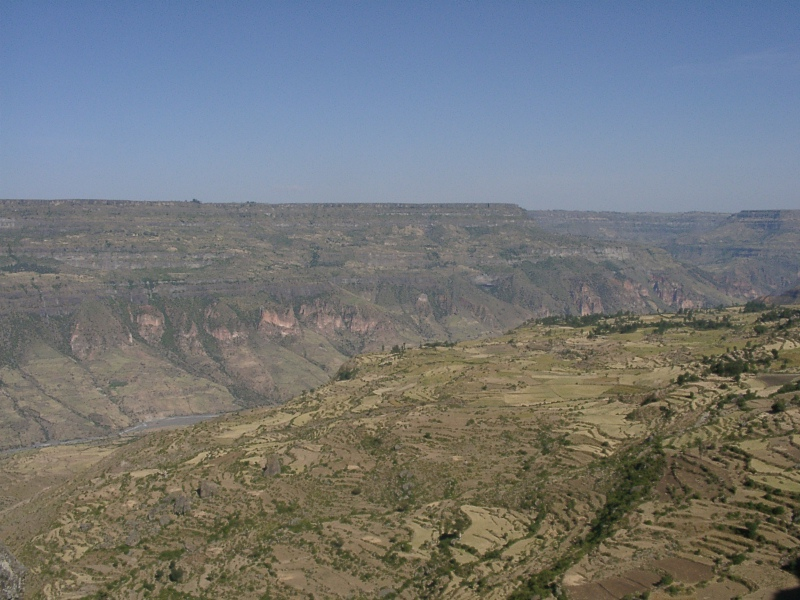
- A canyon near Debre Libanos monastery in North Shewa.
- Country: Ethiopia
- Region: Oromia
- Administrative centre: Fiche

Area
  - Total: 10,322.48 km^{2} (3,985.53 sq mi)

Population (2007)
  - Total: 1,431,305
  - Density: 138.6590/km^{2} (359.1252/sq mi)

North Shewa (Oromo: Shawaa Kaabaa) is a zone in Oromia Region of Ethiopia. North Shewa takes its name from the kingdom of Shewa or former province of Shewa. North Shewa is bordered on the south by Addis Ababa on the southwest by West Shewa, on the north by North Shewa (Amhara), and on the southeast by East Shewa. Town include Ali Doro, Fiche and Gerba Guracha, Sheno.

Map of the regions and zones of Ethiopia

== Demographics ==
Based on the 2007 Census conducted by the Central Statistical Agency of Ethiopia (CSA), this Zone has a total population of 1,431,305, of whom 717,552 are men and 713,753 women; with an area of 10,322.48 square kilometers, North Shewa has a population density of 138.66. While 146,758 or 10.25% are urban inhabitants, a further 9 individuals are pastoralists. A total of 314,089 households were counted in this Zone, which results in an average of 4.56 persons to a household, and 303,609 housing units. The largest ethnic group reported in North Shewa was Oromo (84.33%) and followed by Amhara (14.99%); all other ethnic groups made up 0.68% of the population. Oromo was spoken as a first language by 82.85% and 16.73% spoke Amharic; the remaining 0.42% spoke all other primary languages reported. The majority of the inhabitants professed Ethiopian Orthodox Christianity, with 92.43% of the population having reported they practiced that belief, while 5.34% of the population were Muslim and 1.61% of the population professed Protestantism.

The 1994 national census reported a total population for this Zone of 1,157,978 in 243,161 households, of whom 576,890 were men and 581,088 women; 86,289 or 7.45% of its population were urban dwellers at the time. The largest ethnic group reported in North Shewa was Oromo (79.53%), while Amhara (19.81%); all other ethnic groups made up 0.66% of the population. Oromo was spoken as a first language by 79.41%, and 20.42% spoke Amharic; the remaining 0.17% spoke all other primary languages reported. The majority of the inhabitants professed Ethiopian Orthodox Christianity, with 94.04% of the population reporting as practicing that belief, while 5.03% of the population said they were Muslim.

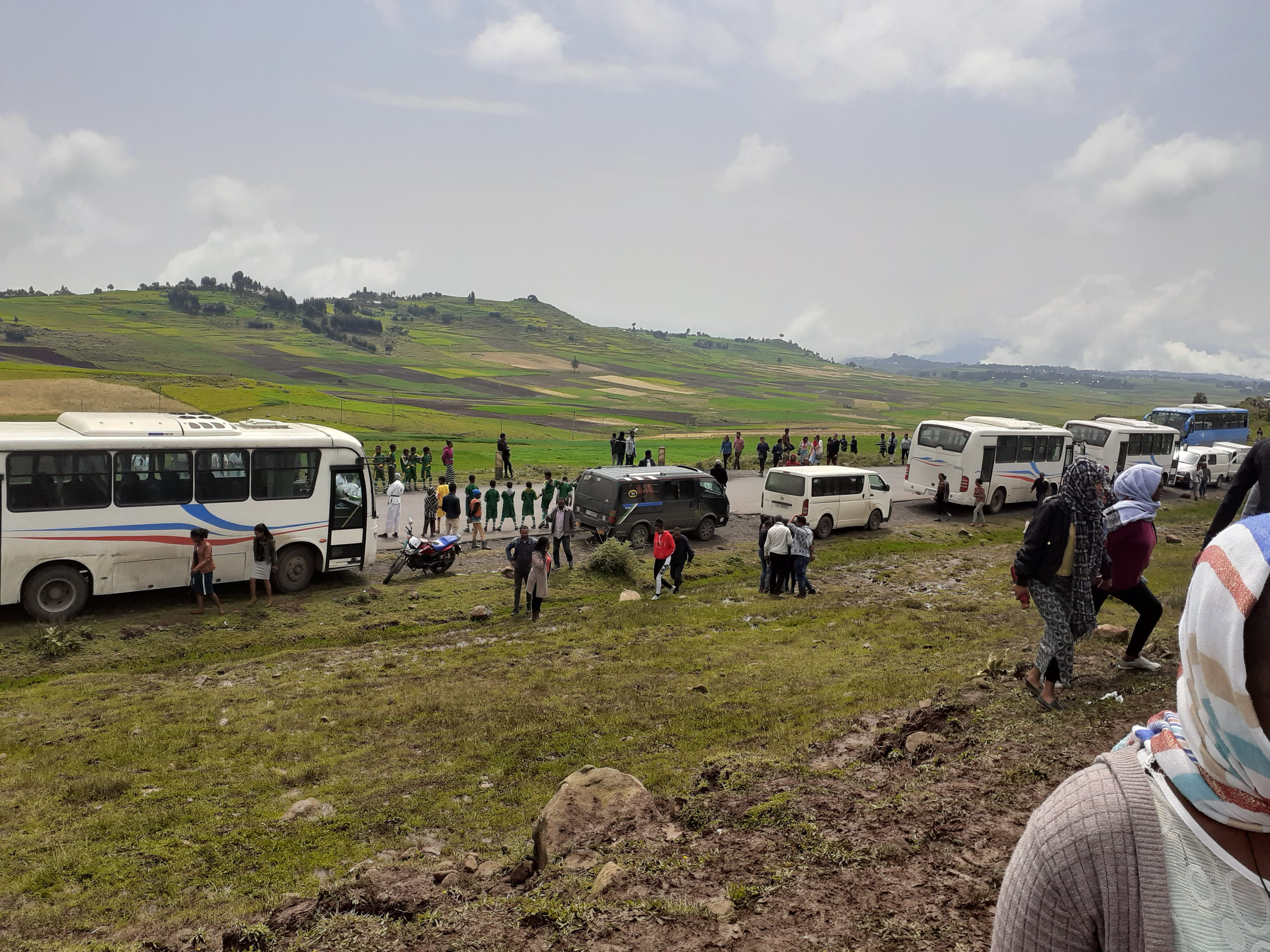
Road transport between Degem Hambiso and Fiche

According to a May 24, 2004 World Bank memorandum, 7% of the inhabitants of North Shewa have access to electricity, this zone has a road density of 55.0 kilometers per 1000 square kilometers (compared to the national average of 30 kilometers), the average rural household has 1.1 hectare of land (compared to the national average of 1.01 hectare of land and an average of 1.14 for the Oromia Region) and the equivalent of 0.8 heads of livestock. 14.9% of the population is in non-farm related jobs, compared to the national average of 25% and a regional average of 24%. 62% of all eligible children are enrolled in primary school, and 12% in secondary schools. 41% of the zone is exposed to malaria, and none to tsetse fly. The memorandum gave this zone a drought risk rating of 510.
