= List of governors of the regions of Ethiopia =

The regions of Ethiopia

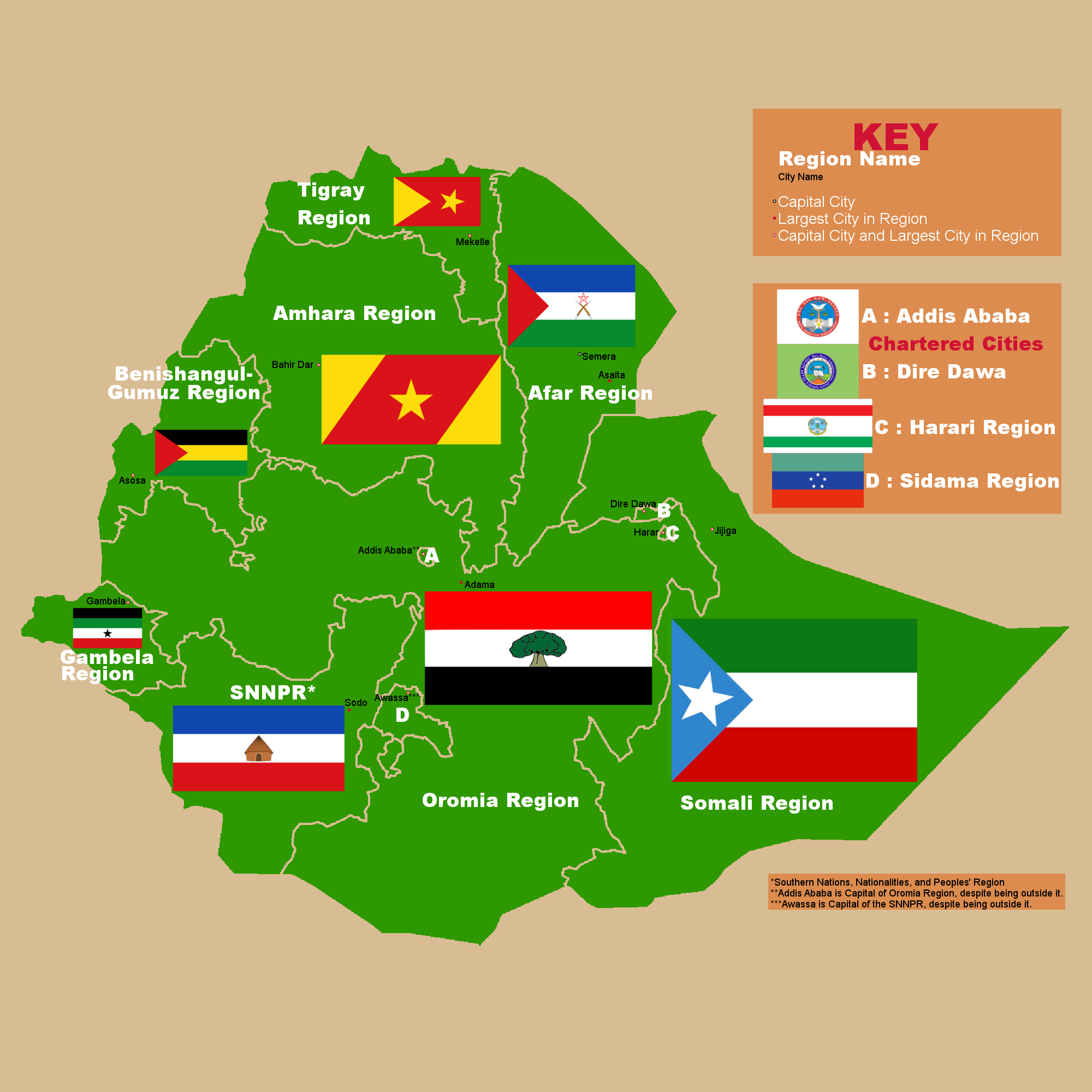
The former regions and chartered cities of Ethiopia, their respective flags, their capitals, and their largest cities

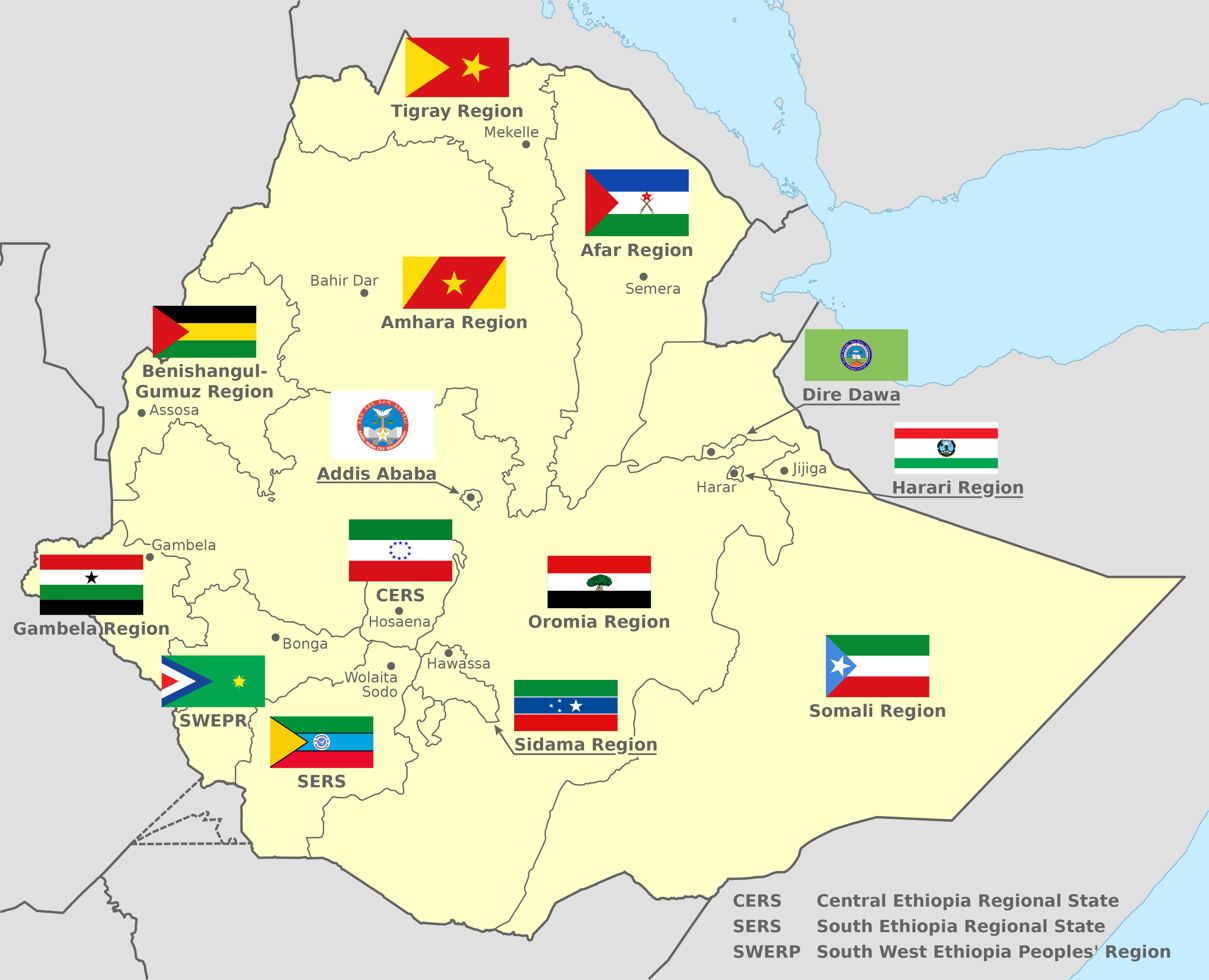
The current regions and chartered cities of Ethiopia, their respective flags, their capitals, and their largest cities

Ethiopia is divided into twelve regions and two chartered cities, each of which is headed by a governor. The regions replaced the provinces in 1992 under the Transitional Government, the change which was formalised when the 1995 Constitution came into force.

The governors of the regions are officially styled as President of the Executive Committee or Chief Administrator of the Region.

== Regions ==
=== Afar ===
Map of the Afar Region (red) within Ethiopia

Tenure	Portrait	Incumbent	Affiliation	Notes
1992 to 1995		Habib Ali Mirah	ALF	
September 1995 to March 1996		Hanfareh Ali Mirah	ALF	
March 1996 to 2015		Ismail Ali Serro	APDO/ANDP	
September 2015 to November 2015		Awol Arba	ANDP	1st time, acting
16 November 2015 to 17 December 2018		Seyoum Awel	ANDP	
17 December 2018 to present		Awol Arba	ANDP	2nd time

=== Amhara ===
Map of the Amhara Region (red) within Ethiopia

Tenure	Portrait	Incumbent	Affiliation	Notes
1992 to October 2000		Addisu Legesse	ANDM	
October 2000 to 5 October 2005		Yoseph Reta	ANDM	
5 October 2005 to 19 December 2013		Ayalew Gobezie	ANDM	
19 December 2013 to 8 March 2019		Gedu Andargachew	ANDM/ADP	
8 March 2019 to 22 June 2019		Ambachew Mekonnen	ADP	Killed in a coup attempt
22 June 2019 to 15 July 2019		Lake Ayelew	ADP	Acting President following Mekonnen's assassination
15 July 2019 to 8 November 2020		Temesgen Tiruneh	ADP	
8 November 2020 to 30 September 2021		Agegnehu Teshager		
30 September 2021 to 25 August 2023		Yilkal Kefale		
25 August 2023 to present		Arega Kebede		

=== Benishangul-Gumuz ===
Map of the Benishangul-Gumuz Region (red) within Ethiopia

Tenure	Portrait	Incumbent	Affiliation	Notes
1993		Atom Mustafa		
1993 to 1994		Atieb Ahmed	BPLM	
1994 to 1995		Abdu Mohammed	BPLM	
July 1995 to November 2008		Yaregal Aysheshum	BGPDUF	
November 2008 to 19 May 2016		Ahmed Nasir Ahmed	BGPDP	
15 June 2016 to present		Ashadli Hassen	BGPDP	

=== Central Ethiopia ===
Map of the Central Ethiopia Regional State (red) within Ethiopia

Tenure	Portrait	Incumbent	Affiliation	Notes
19 August 2023 to present		Endashaw Tassew		

=== Gambela ===
Map of the Gambela Region (red) within Ethiopia

Tenure	Portrait	Incumbent	Affiliation	Notes
1992 to 1997		Okello Ouman	GPDM	
August 1997 to 2003		Okello Gnigelo	GPDF	
2003 to 2004		Okello Akway		
January 2004 to 2005		Keat Tuach Bithow		Acting
29 September 2005 to 16 April 2013		Umed Ubong	GPDM	
16 April 2013 to 10 November 2018		Gatluak Tut Koat	GPDM	
10 November 2018 to 15 August		Omot Ojullu Obup	GPDM	

=== Harari ===
Map of the Harari Region (red) within Ethiopia

Tenure	Portrait	Incumbent	Affiliation	Notes
1993		Gatur		
1993 to 1996		Haji Gotu		
1996 to September 1999		Abdulahi Idris Ibrahim		
September 1999 to September 2000		Gazali Mohammed		
September 2000 to October 2000		Nuria Abdulahi		Female
October 2000 to 3 October 2005		Fuad Ibrahim	HNL	
3 October 2005 to November 2018		Murad Abdulhadi	HNL	
November 2018 to present		Ordin Bedri	PP	

=== Oromia ===
Map of the Oromia Region (red) within Ethiopia

Tenure	Portrait	Incumbent	Affiliation	Notes
1992 to 1995		Hassen Ali	OPDO	
1995 to 24 July 2001		Kuma Demeksa	OPDP	
July 2001 to October 2001		Position vacant		
28 October 2001 to 6 October 2005		Junedin Sado (Juneidi Sad)	OPDO	
6 October 2005 to September 2010		Abadula Gemeda	OPDO	
September 2010 to 17 February 2014		Alemayehu Atomsa	OPDO	
27 March 2014 to 23 October 2016		Muktar Kedir	OPDO	
23 October 2016 to 18 April 2019		Lemma Megersa	OPDO/ODP	
18 April 2019 to present		Shimelis Abdisa	ODP	

=== Sidama ===
Map of the Sidama Region (red) within Ethiopia

Tenure	Portrait	Incumbent	Affiliation	Notes
9 July 2020 to present		Desta Ledamo		

=== Somali ===
Map of the Somali Region (red) within Ethiopia

Tenure	Portrait	Incumbent	Affiliation	Notes
January 1993 to November 1993		Abdulahi Mohamed Sa'adi	ONLF	
December 1993 to April 1994		Hassan Jire Kalinle	ONLF	
April 1994 to November 1994		Abdulrahman Abd Ghani	n-p	
1995 to October 1997		Id Tahir Farah	ESPDP	
October 1997 to October 2000		Mohammed Ma'alin Ali	ONLF	
October 2000 to 2003		Abdul Reshid Dulane	ESPDP	
2003 to 2005		Abdul Jibril	ESPDP	Acting
October 2005 to October 2008		Abdulahi Hassen Mohammed	ESPDP	
October 2008 to July 2010		Da'ud Mohamed Ali	ESPDP	
July 2010 to 6 August 2018		Abdi Mohamoud Omar ("Abdi Iley")	ESPDP	
6 August 2018 to 22 August 2018		Ahmed Abdi Mohamed ("Ilkacase")	ESPDP	Acting
22 August 2018 to present		Mustafa Mohammed Omar ("Cagjar")	ESPDP	Acting

=== South Ethiopia ===
Map of the South Ethiopia Regional State (red) within Ethiopia

Tenure	Portrait	Incumbent	Affiliation	Notes
19 August 2023 to 30 September 2026		Tilahun Kebede	Prosperity Party	
02 October 2026 to present		Tesfaye Beljige (Dr.)	Prosperity Party	

=== SouthWest Ethiopia Regional State ===
Map of the South West Ethiopia Peoples' Region (red) within Ethiopia

Tenure	Portrait	Incumbent	Affiliation	Notes
23 November 2021 to 01 September 2026		Negash Wagesho	Prosperity Party	
01 October 2026 to present		Fikire Aman	Prosperity Party	

=== Tigray ===
Map of the Tigray Region (red) within Ethiopia

Tenure	Portrait	Incumbent	Affiliation	Notes
1992 to 9 April 2001		Gebru Asrat	TPLF	
9 April 2001 to 2010		Tsegay Berhe Hadera	TPLF	Acting to 17 November 2001
2010 to 9 January 2018		Abay Weldu	TPLF	
9 January 2018 to 28 November 2020		Debretsion Gebremichael	TPLF	Acting to 24 September 2020; in dissidence from 13 November 2020, during the Tigray war
13 November 2020 to 5 May 2021		Mulu Nega	PP	Chief Executive of the Transitional Government of Tigray
5 May 2021 to 27 June 2021		Abraham Belay	PP	Chief Executive of the Transitional Government of Tigray
28 June 2021 to 3 March 2023		Debretsion Gebremichael	TPLF	
23 March 2023 to 7 April 2025		Getachew Reda Kahsay	TPLF	Chief Administrator of the Interim Regional Administration of Tigray
8 April 2025 to present		Tadesse Werede	TPLF	Chief Administrator of the Inclusive Interim Regional Administration of Tigray

== Chartered cities ==
=== Addis Ababa ===
Map of Addis Ababa (red) within Ethiopia

Tenure	Portrait	Incumbent	Affiliation	Notes
Mayors and Chairmen of Administrative Council
1993 to 1996		Tefera Walwa	ANDM	
1996 to 24 January 2003		Ali Abdo	OPDO	
24 January 2003 to 9 May 2006		Arkebe Oqubay	TPLF	
9 May 2006 to 20 May 2008		Berhane Deressa	n-p	Acting
20 May 2008 to 9 July 2013		Kuma Demeksa	EPRDF	
9 July 2013 to 16 July 2018		Diriba Kuma	OPDO	
17 July 2018 to 18 August 2020		Takele Uma Banti	ODP	
18 August 2020 to present		Adanech Abebe	ODP/PP	

=== Dire Dawa ===
Map of Dire Dawa (red) within Ethiopia

Tenure	Portrait	Incumbent	Affiliation	Notes
Administrator
November 1991 to January 1993		Habatmu Assefa Wakjira	OPDO	Under federal administration (without autonomy)
Chairman of the Provisional Administration
January 1993 to 1995		Ismail Aw Adem	Gurgure, Somali	Under federal administration (without autonomy)
Chairman of Administration Council
1995 to 2003		Solomon Hailu		Under federal administration (without autonomy)
Chief Administrator
2003 to 2006		Fiseha Zerihun	TPLF	Under federal administration (without autonomy) until 2004
Mayors
7 August 2006 to 21 June 2008		Abdulaziz Mohammed	OPDO	
21 June 2008 to 2010		Adem Farah	ESPDP	
2010 to 2015		Ased Ziad	OPDO	
October 2015 to 2018		Ato Ibrahim Usman	ESPDP	

|October 2018 to present|| ||Ato Kedir Juhar||Prosperity|| |}

== Former regions ==
=== Southern Nations, Nationalities, and Peoples' Region (1992–2023) ===
Map of the Southern Nations, Nationalities, and Peoples' Region (red) within Ethiopia

Tenure	Portrait	Incumbent	Affiliation	Notes
1992 to 2001		Abate Kisho	SEPDF	
12 November 2001 to March 2006		Hailemariam Desalegn	SEPDF	Later served as Prime Minister of Ethiopia from 2012 to 2018
March 2006 to July 2013		Shiferaw Shigute	SEPDM	
13 July 2013 to 24 July 2018		Dessie Dalke	SEPDM	
24 July 2018 to 30 August 2019		Million Mathewos	SEPDM	
31 August 2019 to 18 August 2023		Erstu Yirdaw	Prosperity Party	

== See also ==
- Flags and emblems of the regions of Ethiopia
- Subdivisions of Ethiopia
