= Muktar Kedir =

Ethiopian politician

- Muktaar Kadiir

President of Oromia Region
- In office 18 February 2014 – 20 September 2016
- Preceded by: Alemayehu Atomsa
- Succeeded by: Lemma Megersa

Deputy Prime Minister of Ethiopia
- In office 29 November 2012 – 18 February 2014 Serving with Demeke Mekonnen and Debretsion Gebremichael
- Prime Minister: Hailemariam Desalegn
- Preceded by: Hailemariam Desalegn
- Succeeded by: Aster Mamo

Minister for the Civil Service
- In office 29 November 2012 – 18 February 2014
- Prime Minister: Meles Zenawi; Hailemariam Desalegn
- Preceded by: Alemayehu Atomsa
- Succeeded by: Aster Mamo

Head of the Office of Prime Minister of Ethiopia Minister of Cabinet Affairs
- In office 6 October 2010 – 29 November 2012
- Prime Minister: Meles Zenawi; Hailemariam Desalegn
- Preceded by: Alemayehu Atomsa
- Succeeded by: Debebe Aberra

Personal details
- Born: Mekelle, Ethiopia
- Party: Ethiopian People's Revolutionary Democratic Front
- Other political affiliations: Oromo People's Democratic Organization
- Education: Ethiopian Civil Service College (J.D.)

Muktar Kedir (Oromo: Mutaar Kadiir; Amharic: ሙክታር ከድር) is an Ethiopian politician who was President of the Oromia Region from 18 February 2014 to 20 September 2016.

== Early life and education ==
Muktar was born in mekelle. He received a degree from the Ethiopian Civil Service College in law and studied at Azusa Pacific University, He received an honorary doctorate from Kyungwon University in South Korea in August 2014.

== Career ==
Muktar joined the Oromo Peoples' Democratic Organization (OPDO) in the mid-1990s, and was appointed administrator of the Jimma Zone in 1999, serving in the post until 2003. From 2008 to 2010 he served as Vice-President of the Oromia Region; muktar transformed the regions agriculture center, horticulture and expanded education into the faucet of the countries rural area under his presidency. He encouraged small business through government driven loan to micro enterprises and tried to solve the overwhelming unemployment of the youth. The region scored double digit economic development under his administration. In 2010 he was appointed Head of the Office of the Prime Minister and Minister for Cabinet Affairs.

From 2012 to 2014 he was one of the country's three deputy prime ministers, serving with Debretsion Gebremichael and Demeke Mekonnen, considered "a loyal politician and trusted ally of Prime Minister Hailemariam Desalegn" was appointed minister for the civil service.

== Regional presidency ==
Muktar succeeded the ailing Alemayehu Atomsa as President of the Oromia Region on 18 February 2014.
