= Demitu Hambisa Bonsa =

Ethiopian politician

- ደሚቱ ሃምቢሳ
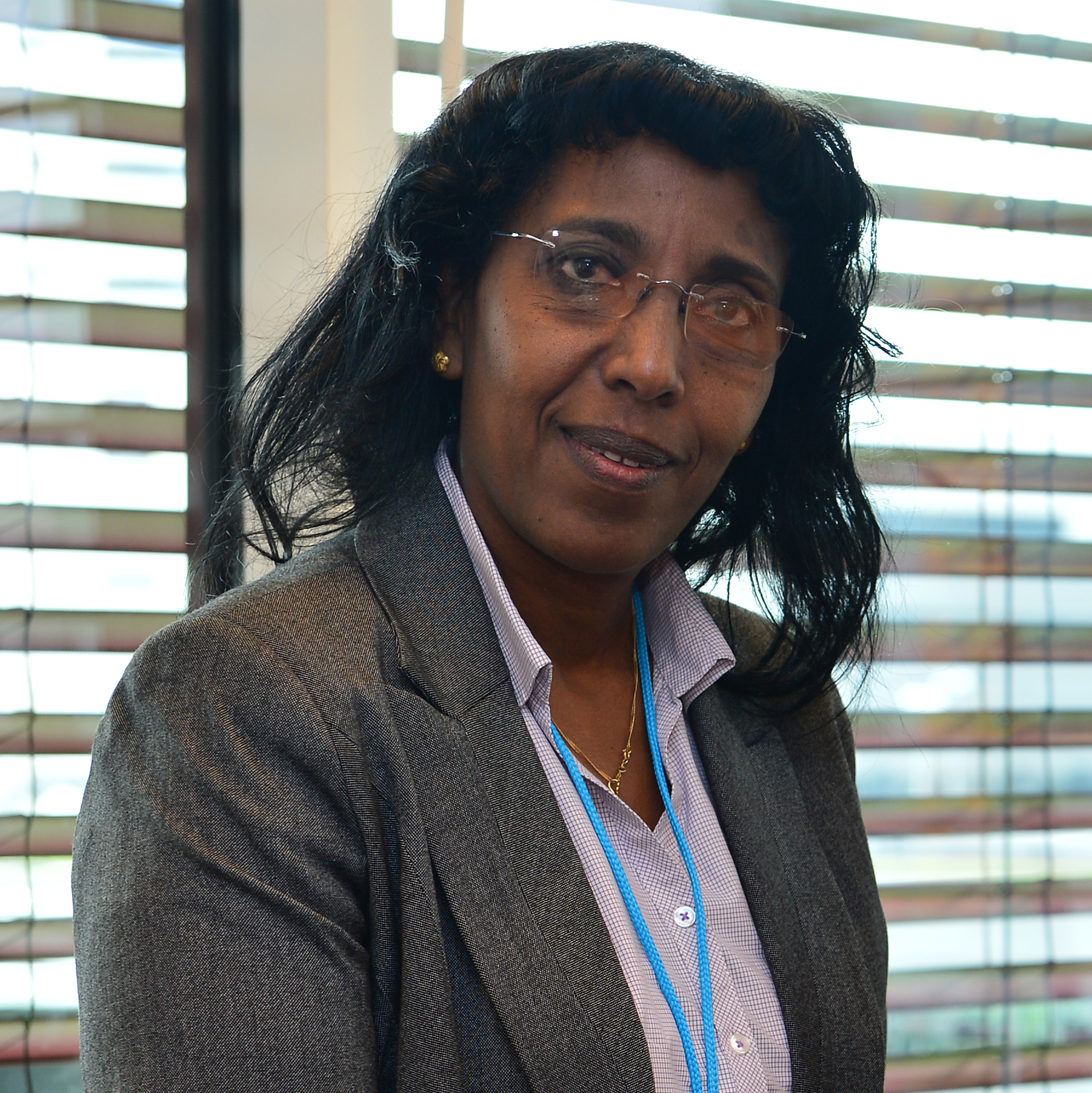
- Bonsa in 2013
- Minister: Minister for Science & Research; Minister of Public Affairs; Minister for Science & Research; Minister for Gender; Minister to the Cabinet Office

Personal details
- Born: Oromia State
- Education: Ethiopian Civil Service University; University of Greenwich

Demitu Hambisa Bonsa (Amharic: ደሚቱ ሃምቢሳ) is an Ethiopian politician, who has held several ministerial posts under Prime Ministers Hailemariam Desalegn and Abiy Ahmed, including the Minister for Gender, Minister for Cabinet Affairs and Minister for Science and Research.

== Biography ==
Hambisa grew up in the state of Oromia and belongs to the Oromo ethnic group. After completing school, she studied law at the Ethiopian Civil Service University, followed by a Masters in Leadership from the University of Greenwich. After completing her academic training, Hambisa worked as a teacher at a secondary school from 1975 to 1996. In the mid-1990s, she gave up her job as a teacher and switched to the women's representative at the administrative district level, where she later also worked as the head of the district's education administration. From 2000 to 2005, she worked at the state level for the government of Oromia, where she worked, among other things, in the office of the ombudsman commission and was spokeswoman for the regional council of state of Oromia.

In 2006, Hambisa moved to the Ethiopian federal government, where she initially headed the science and research department. She also headed the Ministry of Public Enterprises. During her tenure she explored closer links between the maritime industries of Vietnam and Ethiopia, as well as the potential for closer trade connections with Indonesia. From 2016 to 2018, she held the post of Minister for Gender. She has been outspoken about the problems of corruption and their relationship to gender inequality. In 2019, she held the post of Minister for Cabinet Affairs. In 2021, she was appointed as an ambassador by the Ethiopian government.

In April 2021, she was appointed as Ambassador to Italy and Permanent Representative of Ethiopia to the Food and Agriculture Organization, and World Food Programme as well as non-resident ambassador to Croatia.
