= Aster Mamo =

Ethiopian diplomat

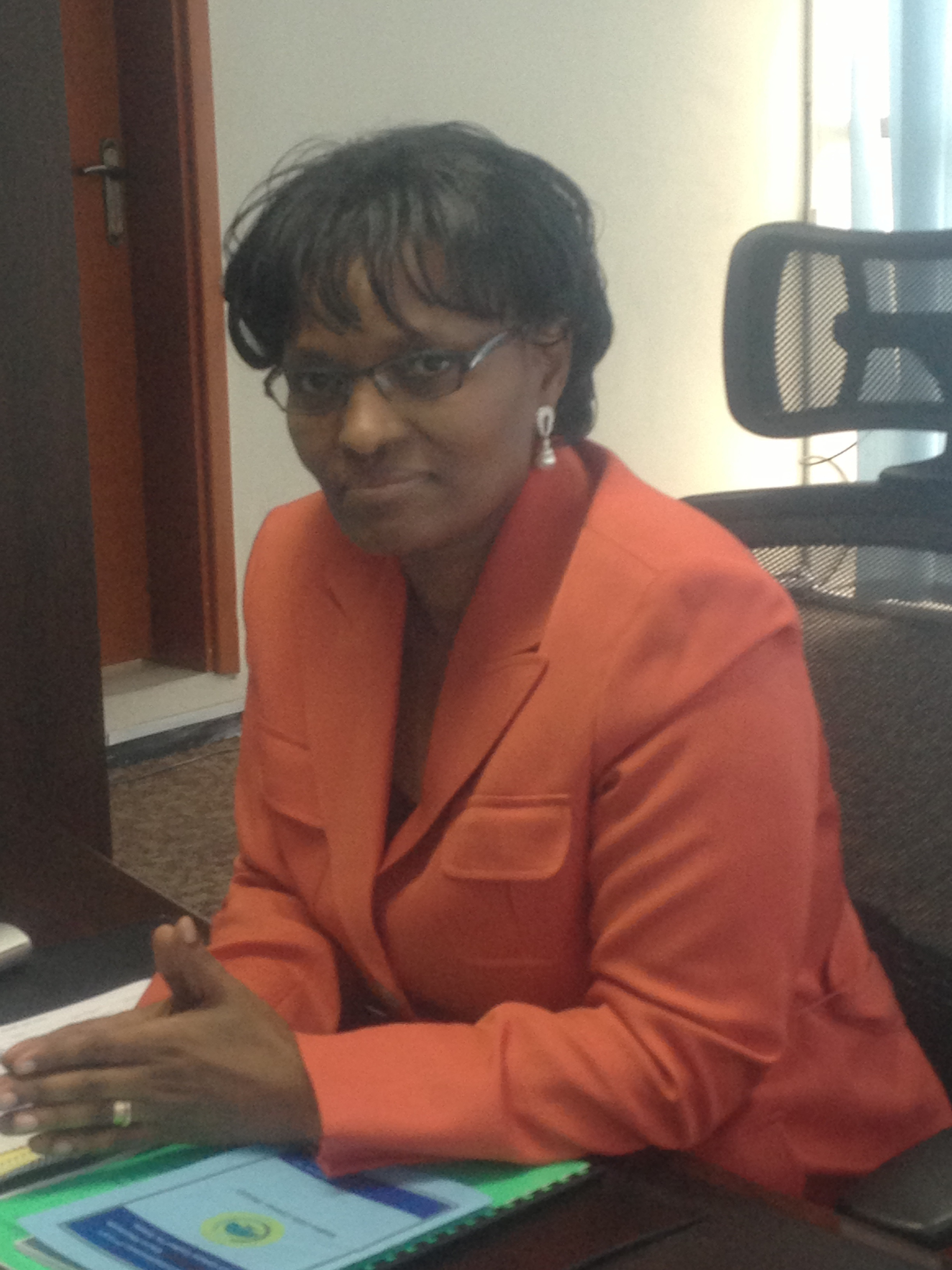

Ambassador of Ethiopia to Canada
- Incumbent
- Assumed office 17 January 2018
- President: Mulatu Teshome; Sahle-Work Zewde
- Prime Minister: Hailemariam Desalegn; Abiy Ahmed
- Preceded by: Birtukan Ayano Dadi

Deputy Prime Minister of Ethiopia
- In office 8 April 2014 – 6 November 2016 Serving with Demeke Mekonnen and Debretsion Gebremichael
- Prime Minister: Hailemariam Desalegn
- Preceded by: Hailemariam Desalegn

Minister for the Civil Service
- In office 8 April 2014 – 6 November 2016
- Preceded by: Muktar Kedir

Personal details
- Party: Oromo Peoples' Democratic Organization

Aster Mamo is an Ethiopian diplomat who is the ambassador of Ethiopia to Canada since January 2018.

== Career ==
Before, she served as the chief government whip of the Ethiopian government from 2014 to 2015 and as a member of the Central Committee of the Oromo Peoples' Democratic Organization (OPDO) until 2016. She has also served as Ethiopia's Youth and Sports Minister from 2005 to 2014.

On 8 April 2014 she was appointed 2nd Deputy Prime Minister and Minister for the Civil Service, succeeding Muktar Kedir in that role. In October 2016, both her posts as 2nd Deputy Prime Minister and minister for Civil Service were abolished and she left her positions after having resigned as Central Committee member of the OPDO.

She is currently ambassador to Canada since 17 January 2018.
