= Deputy Prime Minister of Ethiopia =

- የኢትዮጵያ ምክትል ጠቅላይ ሚኒስቴር
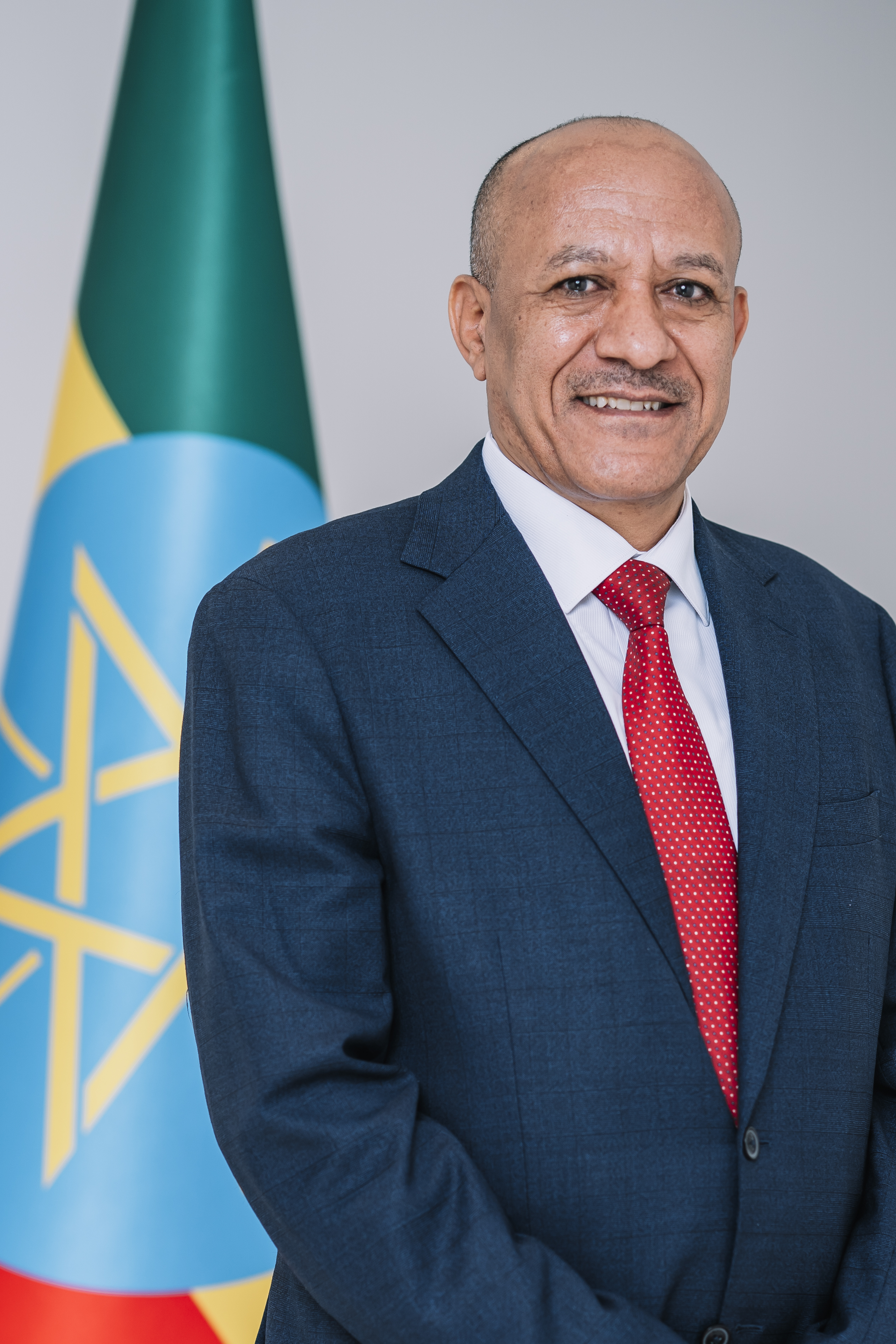
- Incumbent; Temesgen Tiruneh since 8 February 2024
- Type: Deputy Head of Government
- Member of: Council of Ministers
- Appointer: Prime Minister of Ethiopia
- Term length: 5 years
- Formation: 1995
- First holder: Tamrat Layne
- Website: https://www.pmo.gov.et/dep_pm/

The deputy prime minister of Ethiopia is the deputy of the prime minister of Ethiopia.

Article 76 of the constitution states that "the Council of Ministers comprises the prime minister, the deputy prime minister, ministers, and other members as may be determined by law. Article 75 of the constitution states that the deputy prime minister is responsible to the prime minister. The deputy prime minister carries out responsibilities which shall be specifically entrusted by the prime minister. The deputy prime minister also act- on behalf of the prime minister in his absence."

== Deputy prime ministers during the kingdom ==
- Aklilu Habte-Wold, 1957-1961
- Zewde Gebre-Sellassie, 1974

== Deputy prime ministers during Socialist Ethiopia ==
Concurrent holders for the office.

- Hailu Yimenu, 1987-1991
- Alemu Abebe, 1987-1991
- Tesfaye Dinka, 1987-1991
- Tefera Wonde, 1987-1991
- Addis Tedla, 1988-1990
- Ashagre Yigletu, 1990-1991
- Wollie Chekol, 1990-1991

== Deputy prime ministers since 1995 ==
Concurrent holders for the office.

- Tamrat Layne, August 1995 – October 1996
- Kassu Ilala, 1995-2010
- Tefera Waluwa, 1995-2000
- Addisu Legesse, ?-2002-2010
- Hailemariam Desalegn, 2010-2012
- Demeke Mekonnen, 2012-2024
- Debretsion Gebremichael, 2012-2016
- Muktar Kedir, 2012-2014
- Aster Mamo, 2014-2016
- Temesgen Tiruneh, 2024-Incumbent
- Adem Farah, 2024-Incumbent
