= Ethiopian Civil Service University =

Public university in Addis Ababa, Ethiopia

Ethiopian Public Service University
- Type: Public
- Established: 1995
- President: Nigus Tadese (PhD)
- Students: 7,000–7,999
- Postgraduates: 1,531
- Location: Addis Ababa, Ethiopia; 9°01′23″N 38°49′56″E
- Language: Amharic
- Website: www.epsu.edu.et

The Ethiopian Public Service University (EPSU),(previously known as Ethiopian Civil Service University), is a public university in Ethiopia. Its purpose is capacity building in the public sector. It is located in the capital city of Addis Ababa and was founded in 1995.

== History ==
The Ethiopian Civil Service University (ECSU) was founded in 1995 in order to improve the country's Civil Service sector. It was reestablished as autonomous institution in February 1996 by the Council of Minister Regulation No. 3/1996.

As of 2019, ECSU graduated more than 1,531 students with Bachelor, Masters and Doctoral Degrees.

== Notable alumni ==
- Alemayehu Atomsa - politician and president of the Oromia Region
- Demitu Hambisa Bonsa - Ethiopian government minister.
- Birtukan Ayano Dadi - judge and diplomat
- Muktar Kedir - former president of the Oromia Region
- Ambachew Mekonnen - president of the Amhara Region
- Ahmed Shide - Minister of Finance of Ethiopia

== See also ==
- List of universities and colleges in Ethiopia
