= Alemayehu Atomsa =

Ethiopian politician (1964–2014)

Alemayehu Atomsa Alamaayyoo Atomsaa ዓለማየሁ አቶምሳ

President of Oromia Region
- In office 6 September 2010 – 18 February 2014
- Preceded by: Abadula Gemeda
- Succeeded by: Muktar Kedir

Personal details
- Born: Alamaayyoo Atomsaa; 12 February 1969 Bonaya Boshe, Welega Province, Ethiopian Empire
- Died: 6 March 2014 (aged 45) Bangkok, Thailand
- Party: Ethiopian People's Revolutionary Democratic Front
- Other political affiliations: Oromo People's Democratic Organization
- Education: Ethiopian Civil Service University (LL.B.); Peking University (M.P.P.)

Alemayehu Atomsa (Oromo: Alamaayyoo Atoomsaa; Amharic: አለማየው አቶምሳ; 12 February 1969 – 6 March 2014) was an Ethiopian politician who served as the president of the Oromia Region, the largest of the country's regions, from 2010 until his resignation due to illness in 2014, from which he died in Bangkok, Thailand, on 6 March 2014.

== Early life and career ==
Alemayehu was born on 12 February 1969 in the village of Sere in Welega Province, now in Bonaya Boshe District in the Misraq Welega Zone of the Oromia Region. Alemayehu attended school close to his home district at Gubo Leyo Primary School and Siri Secondary School. During the Ethiopian Civil War, he was conscripted by the government to fight against EPLF and TPLF rebels. He, however, was captured by TPLF rebels. Soon after, his captors gave him the option of continuing to be their POW or becoming a founding member of the Oromo People's Democratic Organization (OPDO); he chose the latter.

He received a law degree from the Ethiopian Civil Service University and a Master of Public Policy degree from Peking University in Beijing, China.

Alemayehu started his career as a teacher. He rose to become the Director of the Information Agency of the Oromia Region, and then managing director of the Ethiopian Radio and Television Agency.

Alemayehu joined the armed struggle against the military junta of President Mengistu Hailemariam in 1989. He had been part of the leadership of OPDO and EPRDF since the ousting of the military junta in 1991; among others, as head of Oromia's eastern Wolega zone and head of Oromia's western Wolega zone. Alemayehu served as Oromia's chief of security, as head of OPDO's political department and as head of OPDO's headquarters from 1996 to 2002. He was head of Oromia's Communications Bureau, then Director General of Ethiopian Radio and Television Agency from 2006 to 2010. In 2012, Alemayehu became Chairperson of OPDO and President of Oromia region.

He was the father of two daughters and two sons.

== Presidency of the Oromia Region ==
Alemayehu, an "obscure figure with little connection to the OPDO’s rank and file" became president of the Oromia Region on 6 September 2010, succeeding former General Abadula Gemeda, who was elected to the Federal Parliamentary Assembly and became the Speaker of the House of Peoples' Representatives. "Hailed [for] his strength and leadership charisma", as president, Alemayehu took a strong, public, and controversial stance against corruption, and within months of his assuming office several public officials had been arrested for bribery, nepotism, and other acts of corruption. Under his presidency, the Addis Ababa - Adama Expressway, the country's first modern motorway, was built to connect the capital city of Addis Ababa to the city of Adama, the largest city in the Oromia Region. However, within months of taking office, he fell severely ill due to food poisoning, and remained so throughout his tenure. Thus for much of his tenure, he was abroad seeking medical treatment, and by 2013 he had "virtually withdrawn from public life" as a result. In 2012, he tendered his resignation to then-Prime Minister Meles Zenawi, but it was rejected, as were several other requests, before his resignation was finally accepted on 17 February 2014.

== Illness and death ==
Alemayehu died of food poisoning on 6 March 2014 at the Bumrungrad International Hospital in Bangkok, at 1AM, having received treatment for the five weeks prior. Some opposition sources have suggested that foul play was at hand in his death, as his anti-corruption campaign threatened existing political figures.

At a memorial service at Holy Trinity Cathedral, Prime Minister Hailemariam Desalegn said that Alemayehu had been "a fighter and a comrade who worked tirelessly till the end for the people of Oromia and Ethiopia." Flags around the country flew for three days at half-mast. Also expressing their condolences were President Mulatu Teshome, the House of Federation and the House of Peoples' Representatives.
