= Lemma Megersa =

Ethiopian politician (born 1970)

- Lammaa Magarsaa
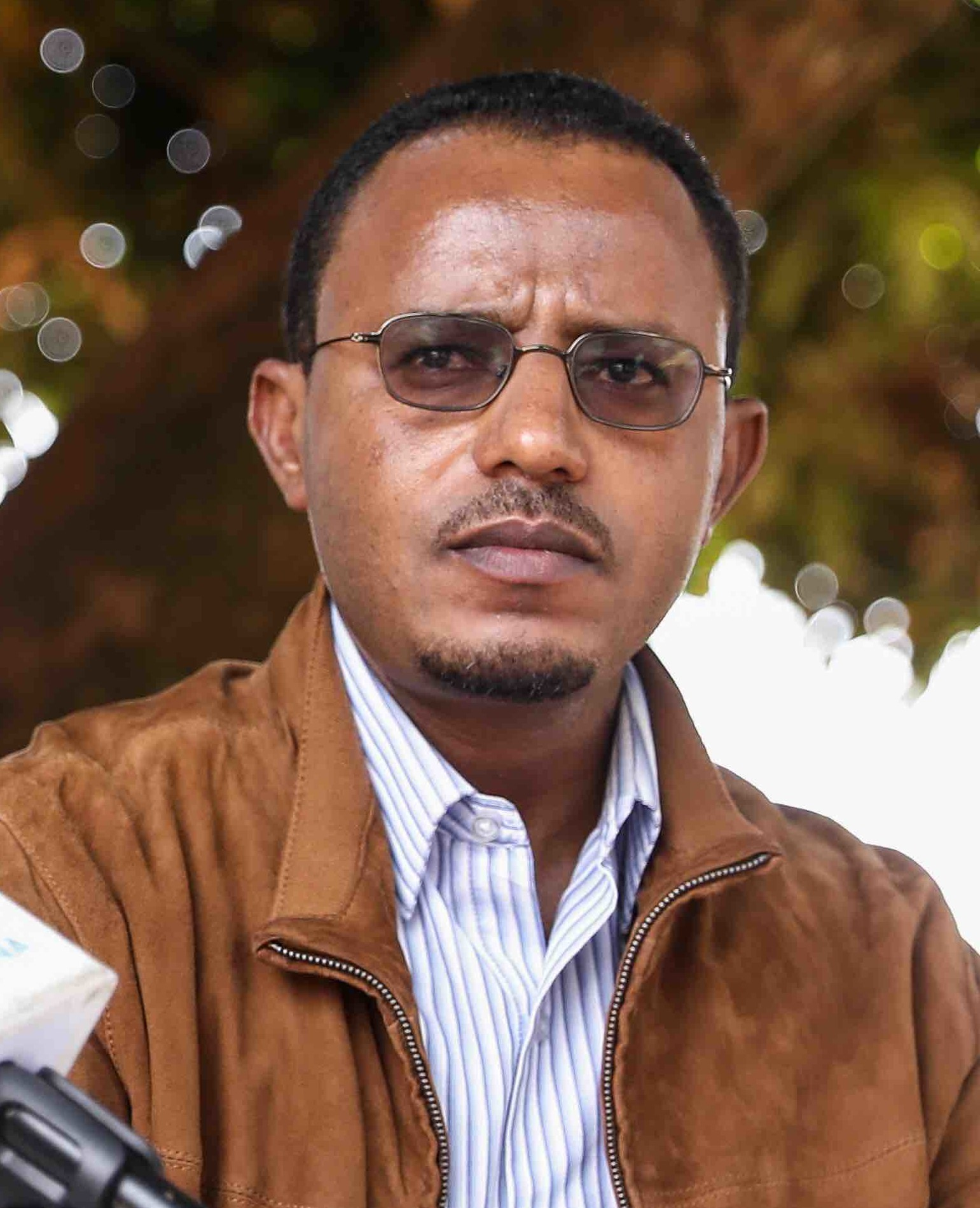
- Lemma in 2019

Minister of Defense
- In office 18 April 2019 – 18 August 2020
- Prime Minister: Abiy Ahmed
- Preceded by: Aisha Mohammed
- Succeeded by: Kenea Yadeta

President of Oromia Region
- In office 23 October 2016 – 18 April 2019
- Prime Minister: Hailemariam Desalegn; Abiy Ahmed
- Preceded by: Muktar Kedir
- Succeeded by: Shimelis Abdisa

Deputy Chairman of Oromo Democratic Party
- In office 22 February 2018 – 1 December 2019
- Preceded by: Abiy Ahmed
- Succeeded by: post abolished

Personal details
- Born: Lemma Megersa Wako; 26 July 1970 (age 56) Welega Province, Ethiopian Empire
- Party: Independent
- Other political affiliations: Ethiopian People's Revolutionary Democratic Front; Oromo Democratic Party
- Education: Addis Ababa University; Jimma University

Lemma Megersa (Oromo: Lammaa Magarsaa, Amharic: ለማ መገርሳ; born 26 July 1970) is an Ethiopian politician who served as the Minister of Defense from 2019 to 2020. He was also the president of the Oromia Region and deputy chairman of the ruling party in the region, the Oromo Democratic Party. Since the formation of the Prosperity Party, Lemma has been independent.

== Background ==
Lemma Megersa was born in the Welega Province. He completed his secondary education at General Tadesse Biru Secondary School. He received a bachelor's degree from Addis Ababa University in Political Science and International Relations, and later graduated with a master's degree in International Relations from the same university.

Lemma served as speaker of Caffee, the Oromia regional parliament, before becoming regional president in October 2016.

== Reforms ==
One of the first reforms Lemma tried to undertake was to prevent the interference of the federal police in the state affairs of Oromia region. He called for respect of the constitution and let the region exercise its constitutional power. In this regard, Lemma managed to limit and prevent the interference of the military in regional demonstrations, and regulating investments within Oromia Regional State.

Lemma also took measures on investment projects that were operating in violation of rules or not benefiting the region. The regional government terminated the operating license of such businesses. Besides, a number of illegal mining companies were shut down.

His efforts to introduce reform and to unite the country led to The Economist describing him as "the country’s most popular politician".

His disagreements with the government made him not want to join in the formation of the Prosperity Party, led by the Prime Minister. In 2020, he was replaced from his post as defense minister after openly criticizing the government's political reforms.

As of December 6, 2020, Lemma has been placed under house arrest.

== Personal life ==
Lemma is a board member of the Assemblies of God in Ethiopia.
