= Resignation of Hailemariam Desalegn =

2018 resignation of the prime minister of Ethiopia

In the face of widespread protests against the government, Ethiopian Prime Minister Hailemariam Desalegn resigned from office on 15 February 2018, becoming the first politician to resign from office in modern Ethiopian history. The day prior, he announced in state television that his resignation is "vital in the bid to carry out reforms that would lead to sustainable peace and democracy," related to the 2014–2016 unrest in Oromia Region, in which hundreds were killed by a government crackdown in Oromia and Amhara Region between 2015 and 2016.

Announcement of resignation of Hailemariam on 15 February 2018

His resignation letter was submitted and accepted by the ruling party Ethiopian People's Revolutionary Democratic Front (EPRDF) and the Southern Ethiopian People's Democratic Movement (SEPDM); the Ethiopian embassy in London also accepted. Hailemariam continued to lead a caretaker government until his successor, Abiy Ahmed, was elected by Parliament on 2 April 2018. Other reasons for Hailemariam’s resignation, beyond the protests, have been speculated, including his belonging to a small minority group of Wolayta, a lack of support by the ruling party, and a perceived personal weakness.

== Resignation ==
On 14 February 2018, Hailemariam announced in a speech on state television that it was "vital in the bid to carry out reforms that would lead to sustainable peace and democracy". The following day, he resigned as both prime minister and chairman of the EPRDF. Linked to this decision was the 2014–2016 unrest in Oromia Region, in which hundreds were killed by government crackdown in Oromia and Amhara Region in between 2015 and 2016. It was the backdrop for a nationwide state of emergency that started in October 2016. Hailemariam's resignation was also linked to political prisoners such as Eskinder Nega and Woubshet Taye who jailed for seven years in prison in 2015. In January of that year, he promised to release some prisoners, including from opposition politicians, and hundreds of them were freed despite retaining high-profile politicians like Bekele Gerba. Furthermore, he stated that the release of prisoners was met with opposition in Oromia Region. By January 2018, more than 60,000 prisoners had been freed despite both Oromo and Amhara underrepresented in the country's corridor of power. To accelerate this, most opposition members in Oromia called for a boycott on 12 February. The boycott was officially cancelled after the release of Bekele Gerba, but protests continued in many places.

The final body, the 180-member council of the EPRDF, planned to convene to accept the resignation and elect the new chairman of the party. According to the Ethiopian News Agency, Hailemariam's resignation as both prime minister and chairman of the ruling party "to be part of the efforts to provide a lasting solution to the current situation" and would stay as caretaker until a successor was chosen. He was succeeded by Abiy Ahmed as prime minister on 2 April 2018.

== Aftermath ==
His resignation received mass protests among youth of Oromia and Amhara people, who contested that the Tigrayan-dominated government demanding political and economic correctness and state corruption abolished. The government later declared a state of emergency concerning the country's human rights records.

On 2 April 2018, Abiy Ahmed from the Oromo People's Democratic Organization (OPDO) was elected as the new Prime Minister and sworn in Parliament. He reformed the country's politics, releasing political prisoners, and relaxing media censorship, and he was later awarded the 2019 Nobel Peace Prize. Although he hoped to bring Ethiopia unity through pan-Ethiopian nationalism, ethnic unrest resurged; both Oromo and Tigray political parties rejected a peace treaty and refused to merge with his newly-formed Prosperity Party.
