= Ashagre Yigletu =

Ethiopian economist, politician and diplomat (born 1938)

- Citizenship: Ethiopia
- Education: University of Belgrade
- Occupations: Politician, Economist

Ashagre Yigletu (Amharic: አሻግሬ ይግለጡ; born 1938) is an Ethiopian economist, politician and diplomat.

== Derg era politics ==
Ashagre Yigletu was educated in Yugoslavia. He obtained B.S., M.S. and Ph.D. degrees in International Economics from the University of Belgrade's School of Economics. He emerged as a prominent civilian figure from the early period of the Ethiopian revolution. He served as acting Minister of Commerce and Industry and led a government delegation to the People's Republic of China in April 1976.

He was appointed Minister of Commerce and Tourism in 1977. After serving as Minister of Commerce, Ashagre was appointed ambassador to Bulgaria.

In 1983 the Institute for the Study of Ethiopian Nationalities was created, with Ashagre Yigletu at its helm. When the Workers' Party of Ethiopia was founded in 1984 Ashagre Yigletu became the secretary for international relations of the party.

== Peace talks ==
Ashagre Yigletu was appointed Deputy Prime Minister of the People's Democratic Republic of Ethiopia. He took part in peace talks with the EPLF hosted by the Carter Presidential Center in Atlanta, United States in September 1989. He signed the following November 1989 peace deal with the EPLF in Nairobi, along with Jimmy Carter and Al-Amin Mohamed Said. However, soon after the deal was signed hostilities resumed. Ashagre Yigletu also led the Ethiopian government delegations in peace talks with the TPLF leader Meles Zenawi in November 1989 and March 1990 in Rome. Ashagre Yigletu led the Ethiopian delegation in the peace talks with the EPLF in Washington, D.C., in March 1991. During a cocktail party hosted by the U.S. State Department in connection with these talks, Ashagre Yigletu was seen conversing cordially with the Eritrean leader Isaias Afewerki (much to the surprise of analysts on Ethiopian politics).

== Later life ==
Ashagre Yigletu moved to the United States. As of 2006, he served as Professor of Economics and Chair of the Department of Economics and Finance at Southern University in Baton Rouge, Louisiana. As of 2011, he served as Associate Dean and MBA Director of Southern University.
