= Birtukan Ayano Dadi =

Ethiopian judge and diplomat (born 1972)

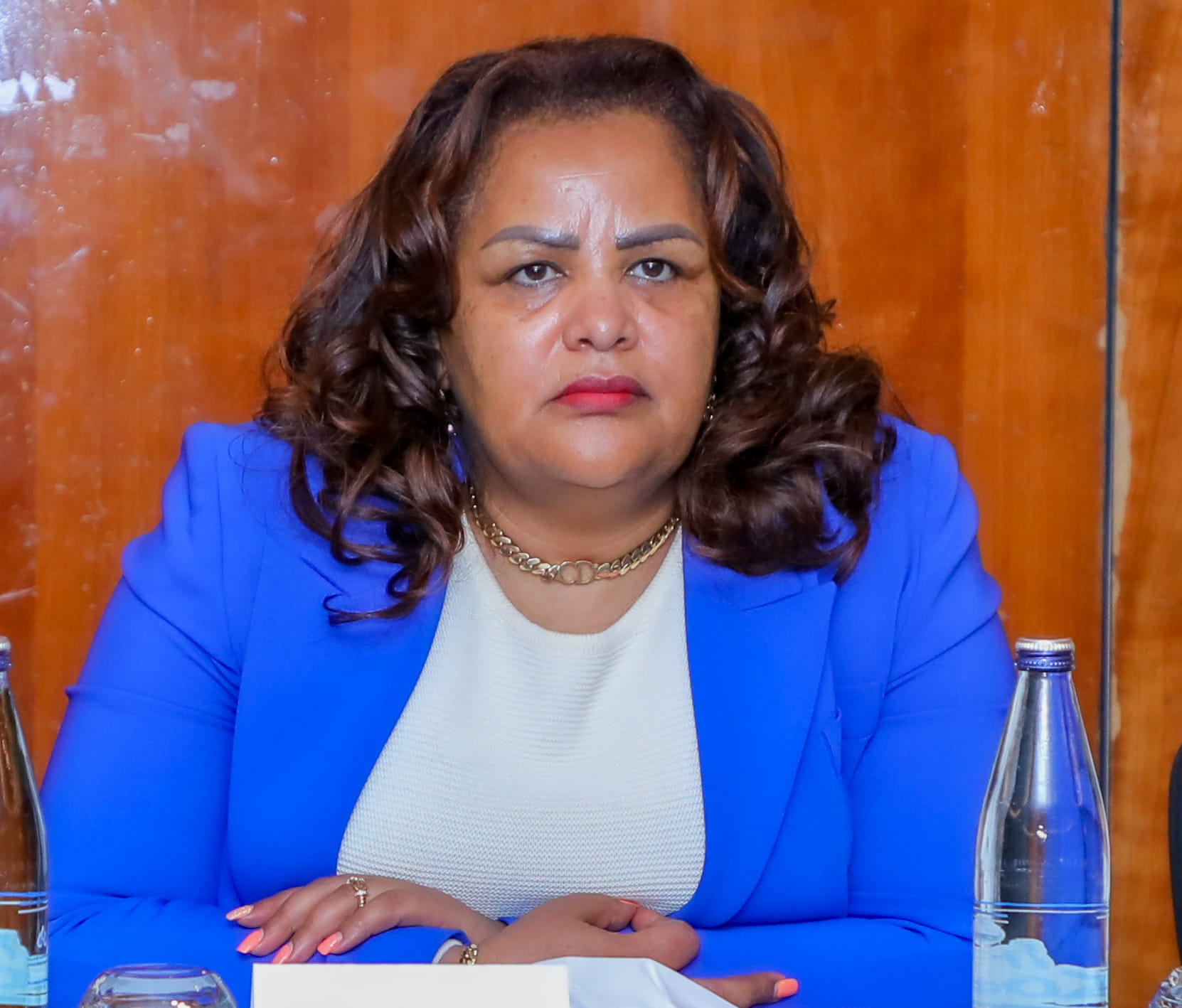

State Minister of the Ministry of Foreign Affairs
- Incumbent
- Assumed office 2018

Ambassador of Ethiopia to Canada
- In office May 2013 – November 2017
- Preceded by: Berhanu Kebede
- Succeeded by: Aster Mamo

Personal details
- Born: 12 November 1975 (age 50) Arsi Province, Ethiopian Empire
- Education: Ethiopian Civil Service University (LL.B.)

Birtukan Ayano Dadi (born 12 November 1975) is an Ethiopian judge and diplomat. From 2013 to 2017 she was Ambassador of Ethiopia to Canada. Since 2018 she has been State Minister of the Ministry of Foreign Affairs.

== Life ==
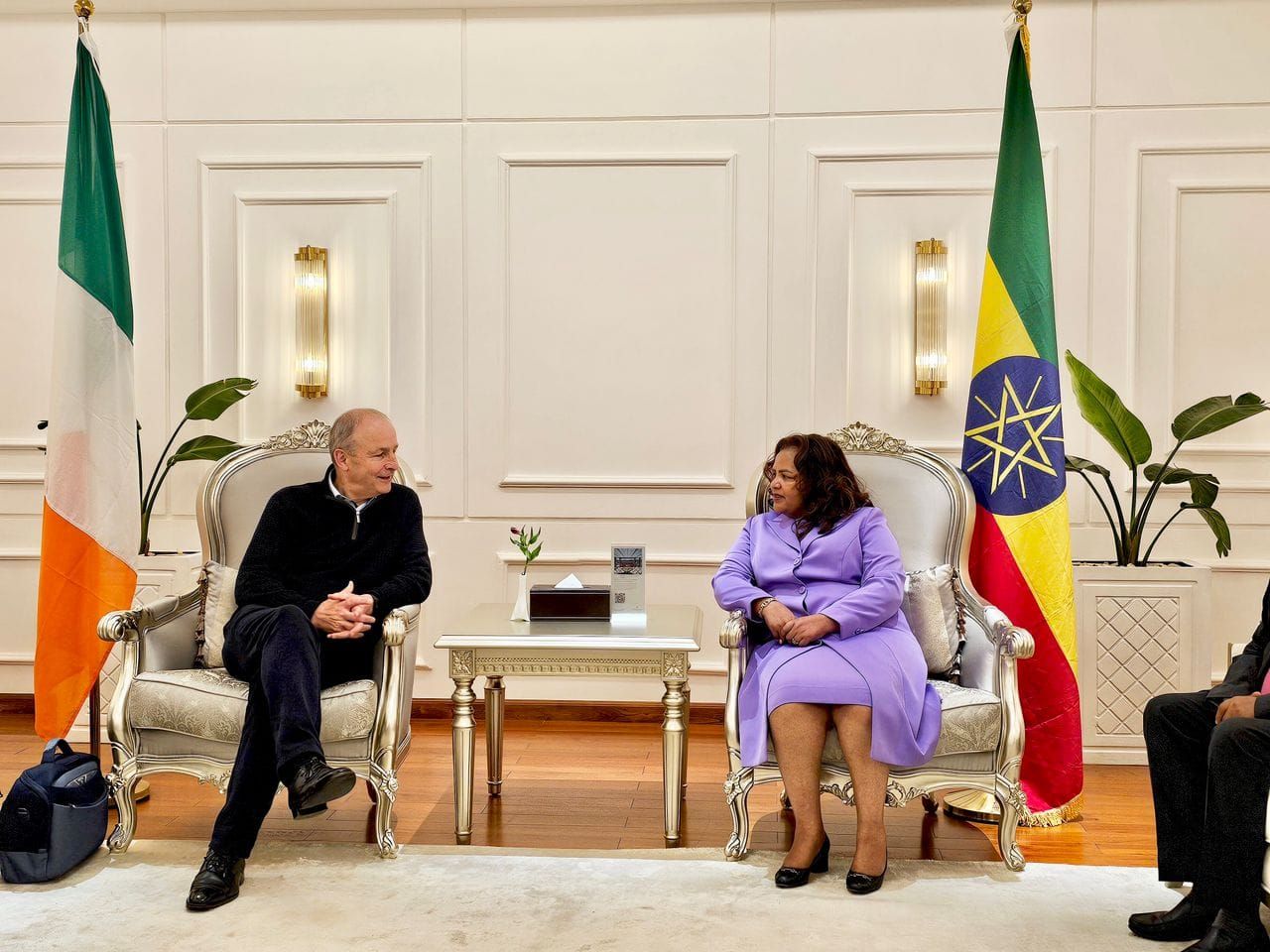
Deputy Prime Minister Michael Martin with State Minister of Foreign Affairs Birtukan Ayano

Birtukan Ayano Dadi was born in Arsi Province on 12 November 1975. After an attempt to abduct her, she moved to Bale Province and was educated at Robe High School. She trained to be a teacher at Bale Teachers’ Training Institute, and worked as an elementary and junior secondary school teacher.

In 2003 Birtukan gained an LL.B. degree from the Ethiopian Civil Service University. From 2003 to 2006 she was a judge in the High Court of Oromia State.

In January 2006 Birtukan joined the Ministry of Foreign Affairs. She became secretary and then counselor at the Ethiopian Embassy, Ottawa, and counselor at the Ethiopian general consulate in Toronto. From July 2011 to May 2013 she became Senior Counselor of the International Treaties and Legal Affairs Directorate General at the Ministry of Foreign Affairs. From May 2013 to November 2017 she was Ethiopia's Ambassador to Canada. In November 2014, while in Ottawa, the Sri Chinmoy Foundation presented her the Peace Dreamers Award.

In December 2017 she became Ethiopia's Director General of American Affairs. In May 2018 she was appointed State Minister of Foreign Affairs for Human Resource and Administrative Affairs.
