= Abay Weldu =

Ethiopian politician

Abay Weldu አባይ ወልዱ

President of Tigray Region
- In office 2010 – 8 January 2018
- Deputy: Kiros Bitew
- Preceded by: Tsegay Berhe Hadera
- Succeeded by: Debretsion Gebremichael

Chairman of the Tigray People's Liberation Front
- In office 19 September 2012 – 28 November 2017
- Deputy: Debretsion Gebremichael
- Preceded by: Meles Zenawi
- Succeeded by: Debretsion Gebremichael

Personal details
- Born: Abay Weldu; 9 May 1965 (age 60); Ethiopia
- Political party: Tigray People's Liberation Front
- Children: 3

Ato Abay Weldu (born 9 May 1965) is an Ethiopian politician who served as president of the Tigray Region from 2010 to 2018. He also served as the chairman of TPLF (Tigray People Liberation Front) from September 2012 until November 2017. He was succeeded in both positions by Debretsion Gebremichael in January 2018 and November 2017. Abay Weldu joined TPLF in the late 1970s and has served as a member of the executive Committees of TPLF and now defunct EPRDF since 2000.

On January 10, 2021, the Ethiopian National Defense Force said that it has killed 15 members of the TPLF, including the region's former deputy police commissioner, and captured eight others, including the region's former president Abay Weldu.
