= Tsegay Berhe Hadera =

Ethiopian politician

- ፀጋይ በርሀ ሃደራ

President of Tigray Region
- In office April 2001 – December 2010
- Deputy: Abadi Zemo
- Preceded by: Gebru Asrat
- Succeeded by: Abay Weldu

Personal details
- Born: 11 January 1947 (age 78) Ethiopia
- Party: Tigray People's Liberation Front
- Children: 3

Ato Tsegay Berhe Hadera is an Ethiopian politician who served as president of the Tigray Region from 2001 to 2010, after serving as vice-president of the regional state of Tigray for 10 years (from 1991 to 2001). He also served as the vice-chairman of TPLF (Tigray People Liberation Front) from April 2001 until December 2010. He was succeeded in both positions by Ato Abay Weldu in December 2010 and September 2017.
