= Demeke Mekonnen =

Ethiopian politician (born 1963)

- ደመቀ መኮንን
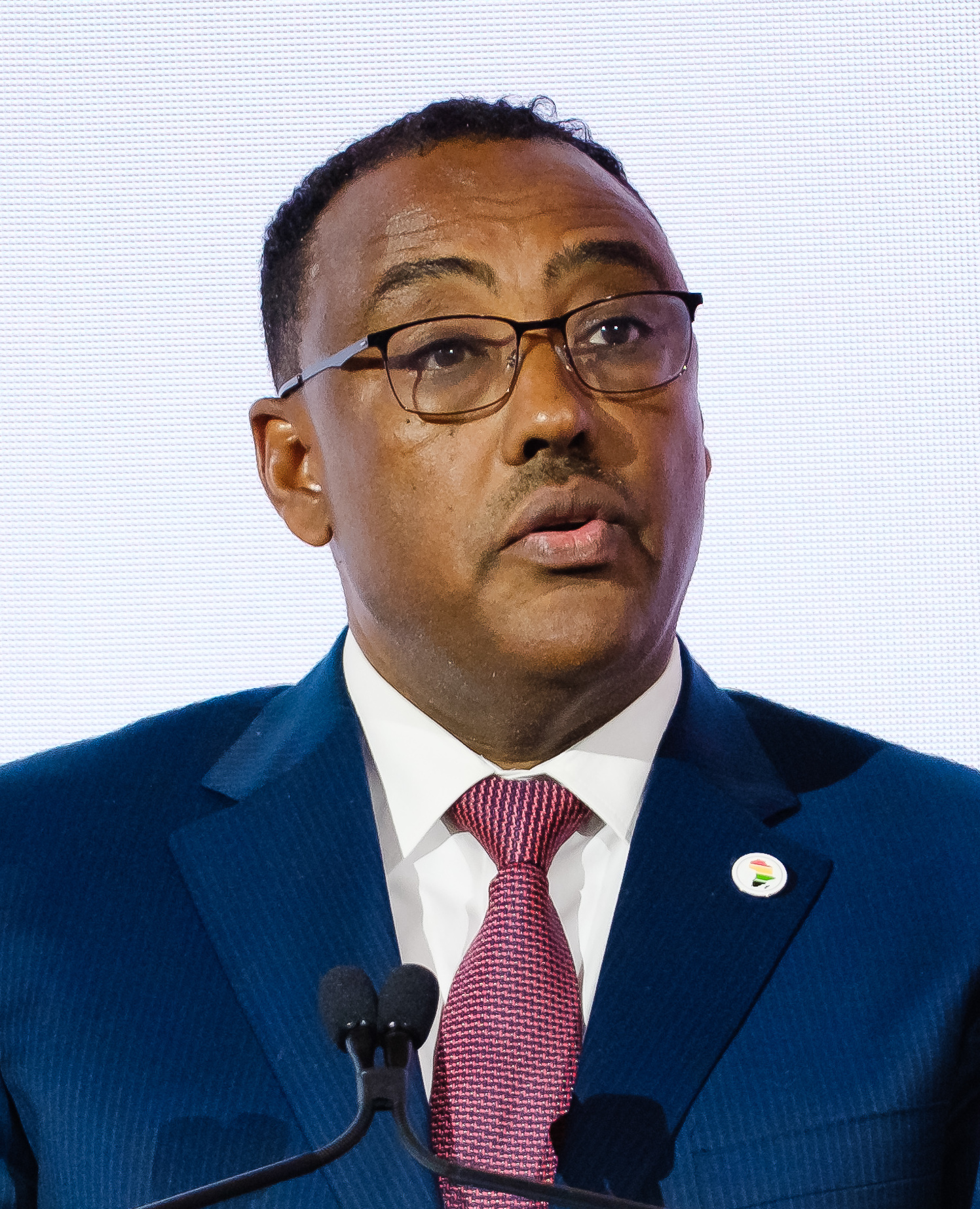
- Demeke in 2020

Deputy Prime Minister of Ethiopia
- In office 21 September 2012 – 26 January 2024 Serving with Debretsion Gebremichael (2012–2016) and Aster Mamo (2012–16)
- Prime Minister: Hailemariam Desalegn; Abiy Ahmed
- Preceded by: Hailemariam Desalegn
- Succeeded by: Temesgen Tiruneh

Minister of Foreign Affairs
- In office 4 November 2020 – 1 February 2024
- Prime Minister: Abiy Ahmed
- Preceded by: Gedu Andargachew
- Succeeded by: Taye Atskeselassie
- In office 8 March 2019 – 18 April 2019
- Prime Minister: Abiy Ahmed
- Preceded by: Workneh Gebeyehu
- Succeeded by: Gedu Andargachew

Chairman of the Amhara Democratic Party
- In office 8 September 2010 – 1 December 2019
- Deputy: Gedu Andargachew
- Preceded by: Addisu Legesse
- Succeeded by: post abolished

Minister of Education
- In office 30 October 2008 – 4 July 2013
- Prime Minister: Meles Zenawi; Hailemariam Desalegn
- Succeeded by: Shiferaw Shigute

Personal details
- Born: 27 September 1963 (age 63) Gojjam, Ethiopian Empire
- Party: Prosperity Party
- Other political affiliations: Ethiopian People's Revolutionary Democratic Front; Amhara Democratic Party
- Spouse: Alemitu Kassaye
- Education: Bradford University; Addis Ababa University

Demeke Mekonnen Hassen (Amharic: ደመቀ መኮንን ሐሰን; born 27 September 1963) is an Ethiopian politician who was Deputy Prime Minister of Ethiopia from 2012 to 2024, Minister of Foreign Affairs from 2020 to 2024 and former vice-president of the Prosperity Party. He previously served as chairman of the Amhara Democratic Party (ADP) and deputy chair of the Ethiopian People's Revolutionary Democratic Front (EPRDF) until the dissolution of the two in December 2019.

== Life and education ==
Demeke was born in the Gojjam Province of Ethiopia and later was resettled to the Chagni district during the Derg's resettlement program. He is a Muslim Amhara.

Demeke was sent to a high school in Feres Bet, a town located in the present day Dega Damot woreda in Mirab Gojjam Zone. Later he joined the Addis Ababa University and studied Biology in the Arat Kilo campus and received his BA in 1988. He also earned his MA in Political Science from Bradford University.

After graduation, he returned to his native region to begin his career as a teacher. He taught biology in Feres Bet High School, for two years, before he was transferred to Bure in the same province. It was in Bure, which housed the lone high school in the area named after the former governor of the region, Ras Bitwoded Mengesha Atikim, that Demeke met Alemitu Kassaye, a student of the high school at that time, and his future wife and mother of his three children.

== Political career ==
Demeke joined Amhara's ruling ADP in the early 1990s. Demeke first took part in the national election held in 1995, and won a seat in the Amhara Regional Council, where he was appointed general secretary. In the middle of his term, he went to England to do his post-graduate studies in conflict management. Upon his return in 2001, he was assigned to establish and lead the ethics and anti-corruption commission of the region.

He was then moved to head the administrative and security affairs bureau of the region, where he had served up until 2005. He was then promoted to the vice presidency of the regional state following the highly contested election in 2005, under the presidency of Ayalew Gobeze. A year later, he was elected to the executive committee of ANDM, a member of the EPRDF coalition formed in 1983, in Jerba Yohannes of Wag Himra Zone. Finally, he was elevated to the position of deputy chair of the party replacing Tefera Walwa; and in 2010 became the first non-combatant chairman of the ANDM, replacing Addisu Legesse.

Demeke's first role on the national level within the ruling EPRDF coalition began in 2008, when he took over the post of Minister of Education under the then Prime Minister Meles Zenawi. He continued to serve as minister until July 2013, when he resigned due to his heavy workload as deputy prime minister. Demeke had assumed the role in September 2012 under Prime Minister Hailemariam Desalegn.

The main task given to Demeke in 2012 was the coordination of efforts to implement and further the Growth and Transformation Plan across all governmental ministries and agencies.

In late 2015, the lower than expected spring and summer rains and the upcoming El Nino event resulted in a severe drought in Ethiopia in 2016, considered the worst drought in 30 years, with up to 10% of Ethiopians in the eastern and southern parts of Ethiopia requiring international assistance to survive in 2016 and 2017. Demeke was assigned to the task to organize the government response and to organize the food aid provided by international organizations.

On 15 February 2018, then Prime Minister Hailemariam Desalegn announced his resignation. It was then expected that the ruling EPRDF would name deputy prime minister Demeke as the successor to Hailemariam, but this did not happen. Instead, Hailemariam continued as a caretaker until the election of a new prime minister, Abiy Ahmed, on 2 April 2018. Demeke Mekonnen was kept as deputy prime minister under the new government.

On 4 November 2020, Prime Minister Abiy Ahmed nominated Demeke as foreign minister and became vice president of the Prosperity Party. On 26 January 2024, Demeke resigned from both positions. After long time abandonment of the politics, he founded Yadam Foundation on 16 December, a non-governmental organization that aims to combat malnutrition in Africa. In the inaugural speech, Demeke highlighted the importance of foundation to foster better nutrition is critical for human capital development, economic growth, and a healthier future for the continent.

== See also ==
- List of heads of government of Ethiopia
