= Shiferaw Shigute =

Ethiopian politician

Shiferaw Shigutie Wolassa
- ሸፈራው ሸጉጤ

Minister of Agriculture and Livestock
- In office 19 April 2018 – October 2018
- Preceded by: Fekadu Beyene; Eyasu Abraha Alle
- Succeeded by: Umer Hussien

With Rank Of Minister Chief Coordinator of Democratic System Building Center
- In office 22 October 2016 – April 2018
- Preceded by: Demeke Mekonnen
- Succeeded by: Fetlework Gebregziabher

Minister of Education
- In office 4 July 2013 – 1 November 2016
- Preceded by: Demeke Mekonnen
- Succeeded by: Shiferaw Tekle-Mariam

President of the Southern Nations, Nationalities, and Peoples' Region
- In office 10 March 2006 – 4 July 2013
- Preceded by: Hailemariam Desalegn
- Succeeded by: Dessie Dalke

Ambassador plenipotentiary of Ethiopia to the Republic of Korea
- In office October 2019 – October 2021

Regional Capacity Building Coordination Bureau head (SNNPRS)
- In office December 2002 – March 2006

Regional Auditor General (SNNPRS)
- In office November 2001 – December 2002

Executive Director of Education and Training Authority ETA
- In office October 2022 – incumbent

Member of Parliament
- In office September 2015 – September 2021

Member and chair of the standing committee of the House of Federation
- In office 2006 – September 2015

Chairman Southern Ethiopian People's Democratic Movement and Executive Committee member of the EPRDF
- In office February 2018 – June 2018

Deputy of SEPDM and Executive Committee member of the EPRDF
- In office September 2002 – February 2018

Personal details
- Born: 4 September 1969 (age 57) Sidama Aroressa/Qiniqamo
- Party: Ethiopian People's Revolutionary Democratic Front (1993–2018); Southern Ethiopian People's Democratic Movement (1993–2018)
- Spouse: Aynalem Assefa Rewo (m. 1994)
- Children: 6
- Education: Cranfield University

Shiferaw Shigute (Amharic: ሸፈራው ሸጉጤ, shefärawə shegut'ē) is an Ethiopian politician who was the Minister of Agriculture and Livestock, Minister of Education, President of the SNNPR, and Chairman of the then SEPDM (Southern Ethiopian People's Democratic Movement), one of the parties that made up the current ruling Prosperity Party.

== Career ==
Shiferaw has served in the regional government of the SNNPR as departmental head in different sectors such as the Regional State Audit Bureau and the Capacity Building Coordination Bureau. He also served as deputy president of the region's government. Finally, before becoming the Minister of Education, he was President of the SNNPR for more than seven years. He served Minister of Education from 2013 to 2016 and served as President of the Southern Nations, Nationalities, and Peoples' Region from 2006 to 2013.

He has been serving as the Chairman of SEPDM, the ruling party in the SNNPR, until 25 June 2018 when he resigned from his role. He is the Minister of Agriculture and Livestock. As Minister of Agriculture and Livestock since April 2018 he is a powerful minister in the government of the new Prime Minister Abiy Ahmed. His ministry, the Ministry of Agriculture & Livestock is a new large ministry in Ethiopia, which was formed from two smaller ministries, the Ministry of Agriculture & Natural Resources and the Ministry of Livestock & Fisheries in April 2018.

== Education ==
Shiferaw Shigutie obtained a bachelor of art degree in Accounting from Civil Service College and received his master's degree in Organizational Leadership from the Azusa Pacific University in the United States. He received his PhD in political science from [[Cranfield University] in the [UK]].
