= Addisu Legesse =

Ethiopian politician

- አዲሱ ለገሰ

Chairman of the Amhara Democratic Party
- In office 1992–2010
- Preceded by: position established
- Succeeded by: Demeke Mekonnen

Chief Administrator of Amhara Region
- In office 1992–2000
- Preceded by: position established
- Succeeded by: Ayalew Gobeze

Deputy Prime Minister of Ethiopia
- In office 2001 – 1 September 2010
- Succeeded by: Hailemariam Desalegn

Minister of Agriculture and Rural Development
- In office 2000–2008
- Preceded by: Tefera Deribew
- Succeeded by: Girma Amente

Personal details
- Party: Amhara Democratic Party
- Other political affiliations: Ethiopian People's Revolutionary Democratic Front; Southern Ethiopian People's Democratic Movement

Addisu Legesse is an Ethiopian politician who served as Deputy Prime Minister of Ethiopia from 2000 to 2010. He was formerly the chairman of the Amhara Democratic Party (ADP), the Amhara region branch of the ruling EPRDF from 1992, a position from which he retired in 2010. He was also President of the Amhara Region from 1992 until 2000 and Minister of Agriculture and Rural Development until 2008. He then served as chairman of Ethiopian Airlines. He was a head of the Meles Zenawi Academy, a quasi educational institution that is designed to train future EPRDF cadres in the ideology of Zenawism.
