= Debretsion Gebremichael =

Ethiopian politician (born 1956)

- ደብረጽዮን ገብረሚካኤል
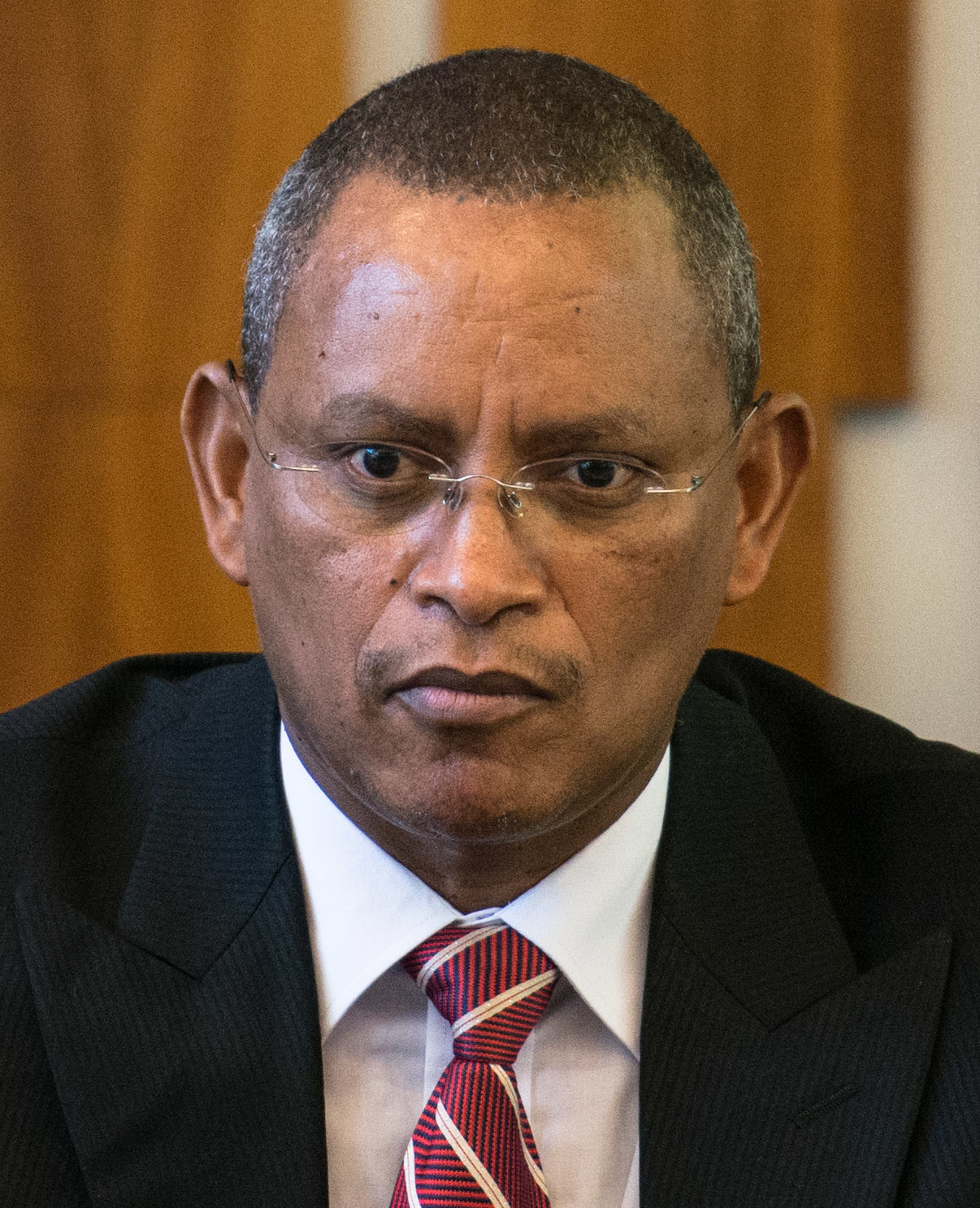
- Debretsion in 2014

President of the Tigray Region
- In office 9 January 2018 – 28 November 2020
- Vice President: Fetlework Gebregziabher
- Preceded by: Abay Weldu
- Succeeded by: Mulu Nega (Transitional Government of Tigray)

Chairman of the Tigray People's Liberation Front
- Incumbent
- Assumed office 29 November 2017
- Deputy: Fetlework Gebregziabher
- Preceded by: Abay Weldu

Deputy Prime Minister of Ethiopia
- In office 29 November 2012 – 6 November 2016 Serving with Demeke Mekonnen and Aster Mamo
- Prime Minister: Hailemariam Desalegn
- Preceded by: Hailemariam Desalegn

Minister of Communications and Information Technology
- In office 10 October 2012 – 8 January 2018
- Prime Minister: Hailemariam Desalegn
- Preceded by: Position established (Promoted to ministry status)

Director of Ethiopian Information and Communication Development Agency
- In office 19 September 2005 – 10 October 2010
- Prime Minister: Meles Zenawi
- Preceded by: Ayenew Bitewelign
- Succeeded by: Position abolished (Promoted to ministry status)

Personal details
- Born: 1962 or 1963 (age 62–63) Shire, Tigray Province, Ethiopian Empire
- Party: Tigray People's Liberation Front
- Education: Addis Ababa University (BSc, MSc); Capella University (PhD)

Debretsion Gebremichael (Note: Tigrinya: ደብረጽዮን ገብረሚካኤል; pronunciation: [dɐbrɐtsʼjon gɐbrɐmikäe̯l]) (born c. 1963) is an Ethiopian politician serving as the chairman of Tigray People's Liberation Front (TPLF). He was previously the president of the Tigray Region. His position as titular head of the Tigray Region was disputed by the federal government of Ethiopia who in November 2020 appointed Mulu Nega as the chief executive of the Transitional Government of Tigray, succeeded by Abraham Belay. From July 2021 to March 2023, Debretsion again led the Tigray Region, while Abraham Belay left the transitional government to become Ethiopia's minister of Defence.

His party nominally won all 152 contested seats and 98.2% of the votes of the 2020 Tigray regional election, which was held in defiance of the federal government that had postponed the elections because of the COVID-19 pandemic in Ethiopia.

== Early life ==
Debretsion was born in c. 1963 and raised in the town of Axum in Tigray. He gave up his engineering studies at Addis Ababa University to join the TPLF in the 1970s and fight the Derg military junta during the Ethiopian Civil War. He was sent to Italy on a false passport and received training in communications technology and led the team that launched the Dimtsi Woyane ('Voice of the Revolution') radio station in 1980. Debretsion was also involved in disrupting the Derg's radio systems.

=== Education ===
After the Ethiopian People's Revolutionary Democratic Front's 1991 victory, he joined Addis Ababa University while working full-time as the second man to Kinfe Gebremedhin. He earned his bachelor's and master's degrees in electrical engineering from Addis Ababa University. He received a PhD in information technology from Capella University in 2011. His dissertation was on "Exploring the Perception of Users of Community ICT Centers on the Effectiveness of ICT on Poverty in Ethiopia".

== Political career ==
In 2005, Debretsion was appointed director of the Ethiopian Information and Communication Development Agency (EICDA). As its director, Debretsion claimed to improve its public service by launching the Public Service Capacity Building Program (PSCAP). In 2007, Debretsion launched a $1.5 billion infrastructure project with ZTE which expanded the network capacity to 30 million (from 6.5 million in 2007 and 1.35 million in 2001) and constructed 10,000 km of fibre cable. By 2012 Ethiopia had constructed 16,000 km of fibre cables and had voice cellular coverage at 64% of the country. In 2012, Debretsion was appointed the federal Minister of Communications and Information Technology. In 2012, Debretsion announced that a $1.6 billion deal had been reached with Huawei, Ericsson and ZTE to significantly expand the capacity of Ethiopia's communication infrastructure. As of September 2016 project has been progressing on schedule. 4G cellular service is now available in Addis Ababa. The ultimate goal of the project is to increase cellular coverage to 100% and to increase capacity to 50 million. Before becoming Tigray's leader, he was sometimes considered as a "low-key technocrat" according to The New York Times.

Debretsion was appointed as deputy prime minister for finance and economic clusters in 2012. In 2015, Debretsion helped to launch a free trade zone with Sudan. In 2015, he inaugurated the construction of the ICT park in Bole Lemi Industrial Park in Addis Ababa. In 2017, he laid the cornerstone for the ICT park and stated that he wants to build more ICT parks in the regional states.

Debretsion was the board chair of Ethiopian Electric Power Corporation. In his role in the state owned electricity company, he oversaw the construction of billions of dollars of hydropower dams and electrical infrastructure, as well as seeing service as the board chairman of the National Council for the Coordination of Public Participation for the Construction of the Grand Ethiopian Renaissance Dam.

In November 2017, Debretsion was elected chairman of the TPLF. His rise within the party was largely facilitated by the fact that he was viewed as a younger figure when compared to the high-ranking figures that had led the TPLF for decades prior, as well as the perception that he was a political moderate who was less committed to Tigrayan nationalism than his predecessors. In January 2018, he was also elected Deputy President of Tigray Region. As Debretsion was not a member of the Tigray Regional parliament, he could not become president. Nonetheless, as the post of the president became vacant, he became the president of Tigray Region in an acting capacity.

=== Tigray War ===
On 4 November 2020, the Tigray War started with the TPLF special forces' 4 November attacks against the Northern Command. Debretsion described the attacks as a pre-emptive defensive action. On 12 November, the Federal Police Commission issued an arrest warrant against him and 64 top officials of the TPLF for severe human rights violations, ethnic cleansing, and terrorism.

The Ethiopian government announced a military victory against TPLF on 28 November 2020. Debretsion was rumoured to have taken refuge in South Sudan until his message to all TEGARUs came out in March claiming that he is, in fact, near the town of Mekelle (Tigray's capital) stating the TDF forces are still fighting intensively and the outcome will only be victory of the people of Tigray. As of early December 2020, TPLF members and their leader Debretsion resisted the Ethiopian and Eritrean invasion by remaining in the mountains. In June 2021, after the TDF controlled Mekelle, Debretsion returned to the capital of Tigray, Mekelle and remains among the main political influencers of this conflict.

=== After the Tigray War ===
During August 2024, the National Election Board of Ethiopia (NEBE) rejected the TPLF's request to reinstate its pre-war legal status. On 12 August, Debretsion declared that NEBE's decision undermined the TPLF's 50-year legacy and violated the Pretoria Peace Agreement which had ended the Tigray War during November 2022.

In March 2025, The Guardian reported that a faction of the TPLF, led by Debretsion, took over several offices in the Tigray regional capital of Mekelle. In what it called a coup, it reported that armed men belonging to the faction patrolled the streets of Mekelle at night, checking people's identification. The Guardian also said that there are some reports suggesting that Eritrean intelligence helped Debretsion's faction assume power. Meanwhile, Interim leader of Tigray, Getachew Reda, fled to Addis Ababa.

== Personal life ==
Debretsion is an avid tennis player in his free time.

He married Askale Gebrekidan. He has two young children. They are US citizens.
