= Hailemariam Desalegn =

Prime Minister of Ethiopia from 2012 to 2018

- ኀይለማሪያም ደሳለኝ
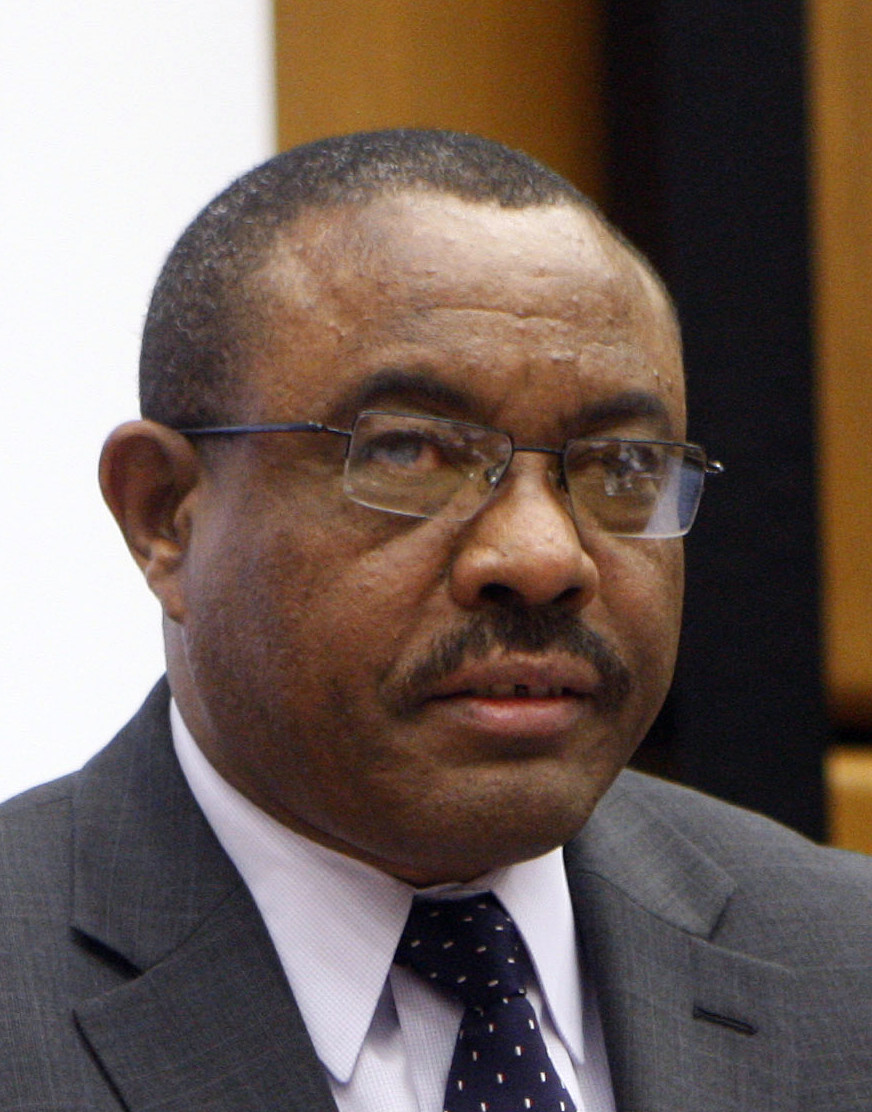
- Hailemariam in 2014

Prime Minister of Ethiopia
- In office 20 August 2012 – 2 April 2018 (Note: Acting: 20 August – 21 September 2012 Caretaker: 11 March – 2 April 2018)
- President: Girma Wolde-Giorgis; Mulatu Teshome
- Preceded by: Meles Zenawi
- Succeeded by: Abiy Ahmed

2nd Chairman of the Ethiopian People's Revolutionary Democratic Front
- In office 16 September 2012 – 15 February 2018
- Deputy: Demeke Mekonnen
- Preceded by: Meles Zenawi
- Succeeded by: Abiy Ahmed

11th Chairperson of the African Union
- In office 27 January 2013 – 30 January 2014
- Preceded by: Yayi Boni
- Succeeded by: Mohamed Ould Abdel Aziz

Deputy Prime Minister of Ethiopia
- In office 1 September 2010 – 21 September 2012
- Prime Minister: Meles Zenawi
- Preceded by: Addisu Legese
- Succeeded by: Demeke Mekonnen; Debretsion Gebremichael; Muktar Kedir

Minister of Foreign Affairs
- In office 1 September 2010 – 21 September 2012
- Prime Minister: Meles Zenawi
- Preceded by: Seyoum Mesfin
- Succeeded by: Tedros Adhanom

President of the Southern Nations, Nationalities, and People's Region
- In office 12 November 2001 – March 2006
- Preceded by: Abate Kisho
- Succeeded by: Shiferaw Shigute

Personal details
- Born: 19 July 1965 (age 61) Boloso Sore, South Ethiopia Regional State, Ethiopian Empire
- Party: Southern Ethiopian People's Democratic Movement
- Other political affiliations: Ethiopian People's Revolutionary Democratic Front
- Spouse: Roman Tesfaye
- Children: 3
- Education: Addis Ababa University; Arba Minch University; Tampere University of Technology; Azusa Pacific University

Hailemariam Desalegn Boshe (Amharic: ኀይለማሪያም ደሳለኝ ቦሼ; born 19 July 1965) is an Ethiopian politician who served as prime minister of Ethiopia from 2012 to 2018. He also previously served as deputy prime minister and Minister of Foreign Affairs under Prime Minister Meles Zenawi from 2010 to 2012. After Meles' death in August 2012, Hailemariam succeeded him as prime minister, initially in an acting capacity. He was then elected as the chair of the EPRDF, the ruling party, on 15 September 2012. Hailemariam also served as the chairperson of the African Union from 2013 to 2014.

Before becoming prime minister, he was a civil engineer, university administrator, president of Southern Nations, Nationalities, and Peoples Region, and later deputy prime minister and foreign minister under Meles Zenawi.

He submitted his resignation as prime minister and chair of the EPRDF on 15 February 2018 in response to the fallout from mass protests and unrest in 2016. His resignation was accepted on 11 March 2018, but he stayed in office as head of the caretaker government until 2 April 2018. Hailemariam is the first ruler in modern Ethiopian history to step down; previous leaders have died in office or been overthrown. He said he wanted to clear the way for reforms.

== Background ==
=== Early life ===
Hailemariam was born in 1965 in the Boloso Sore District Hombba of the Wolayita Zone in southern Ethiopia. Hailemariam is from Wolayta ethnic group of Ethiopia, one of the largest in the Southern Nations, Nationalities, and People's Region (SNNPR). His family belongs to the Apostolic Church of Ethiopia, a Oneness Pentecostal denomination that is not part of mainstream Trinitarian Ethiopian Protestant Christianity (Pentay). Married to Roman Tesfaye, he is well known to be both a religious and family man.

=== Education ===
In 1988, Hailemariam received a bachelor's degree in civil engineering from Addis Ababa University. He subsequently worked as a graduate assistant in the Arba Minch Water Technology Institute (now Arba Minch University). After two years of working in this capacity, he won a scholarship to Tampere University of Technology in Finland, where he earned a master's degree in water and Environmental engineering. Upon his return to Ethiopia, he served in different academic and administrative capacities, including the dean of the Water Technology Institute, for 13 years. In 2006, he also received an MA in Organizational Leadership at Azusa Pacific University, California, US.

== Political career ==
=== Ethiopian People's Revolutionary Democratic Front ===
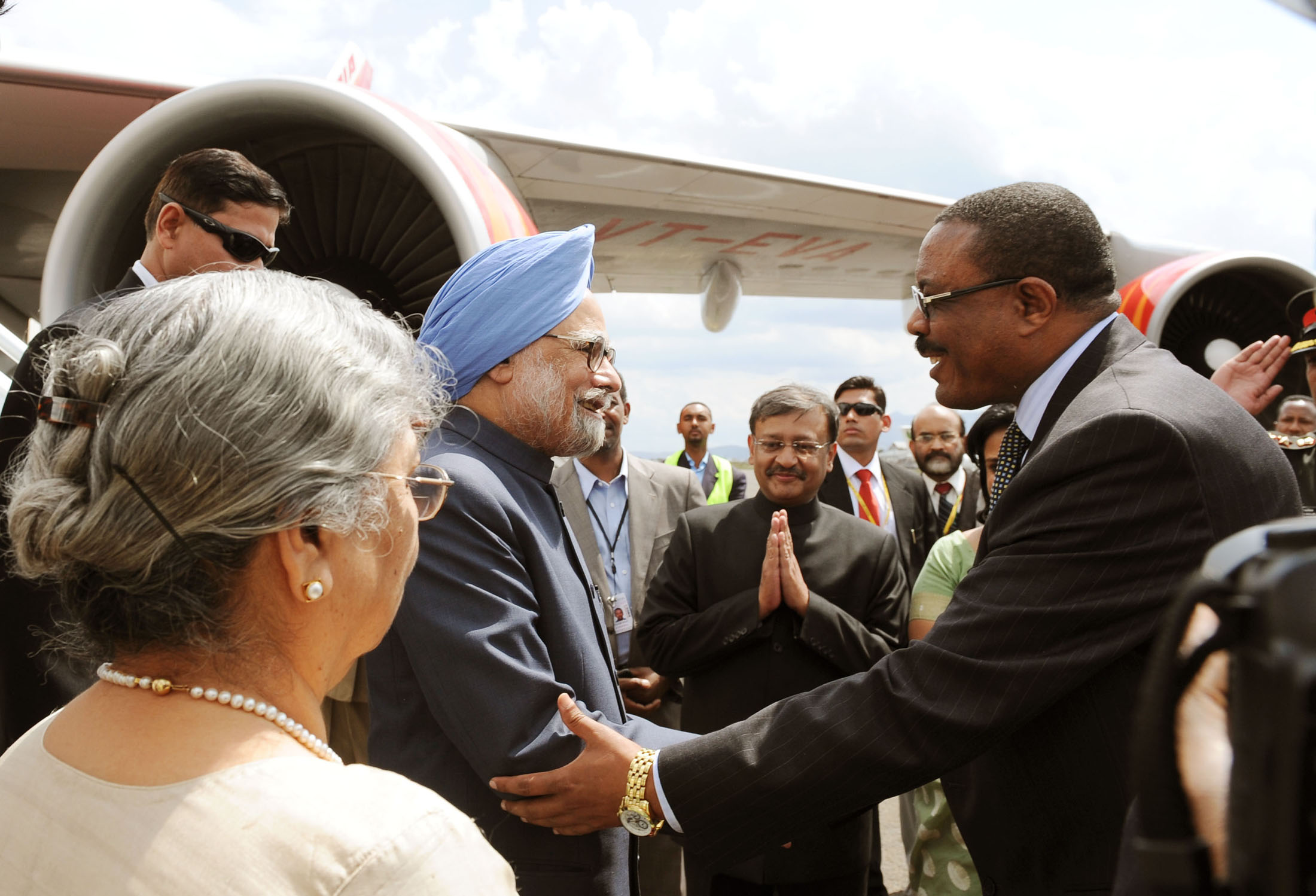
Deputy Prime Minister Hailemariam meeting with Indian Prime Minister Manmohan Singh at Bole International Airport in Addis Ababa, May 2011

In the late 1990s and early 2000s, he became seriously involved in politics as a member of the EPRDF (Ethiopia's ruling party) and became the deputy president of the SNNPR. He replaced Abate Kisho who was removed from power on corruption charges, but it is believed that Abate was demoted for supporting the anti-Meles Zenawi faction when the Tigrayan People's Liberation Front (the core of the EPRDF) split in 2000. Another widely accepted belief about Abate was that he was less educated and exercised poor leadership while he was in power.

=== President of the Southern Nations, Nationalities, and People's Region ===
Hailemariam was President of the SNNPR from November 2001 to March 2006 and was promoted to Deputy Prime Minister and Minister of Foreign Affairs in October 2010. He has been Deputy Chairman of EPRDF, Chairman of SEPDM, Deputy Prime Minister and Minister of Foreign Affairs. He has served as Vice President of the SNNPR (2000–2002); President of the SNNPR (2002–2005); Member of the House of People's Representatives (2005–present); Social Affairs Special Advisor to the PM, then Public Mobilization & Participation Special Advisor to the Prime Minister (2005–2008); Government Chief Whip, with a Ministerial portfolio (2008–2010). Party Posts: Member of the executive committee of the EPRDF and the SEPDM (2000–present); Chairman of the SEPDM (2002–present); Deputy Chairman of the EPRDF (since Sept 2010).

After his tenure as President of the SNNPR, Hailemariam worked in the Prime Minister's Office as the advisor on Social Affairs and Civic Organizations and Partnerships for two years. He led the team that drafted the Charities and Societies Proclamation law (CSO law) that limits the interference of international non-governmental organizations (NGOs) in local political activities. The law was adopted by the Ethiopian Parliament in 2009. He is also credited with pushing EPRDF to re-organize its structure after the contentious 2005 elections via the '1-to-5' model (one member recruits five new people - አንድ ለአምስት አደረጃጀት) that boosted the number of party members from 400,000 to five million by the 2010 elections. In 2010, Hailemariam was sworn into dual ministerial positions as Deputy Prime Minister and Minister of Foreign Affairs.

=== Prime Minister of Ethiopia ===
==== Appointment ====
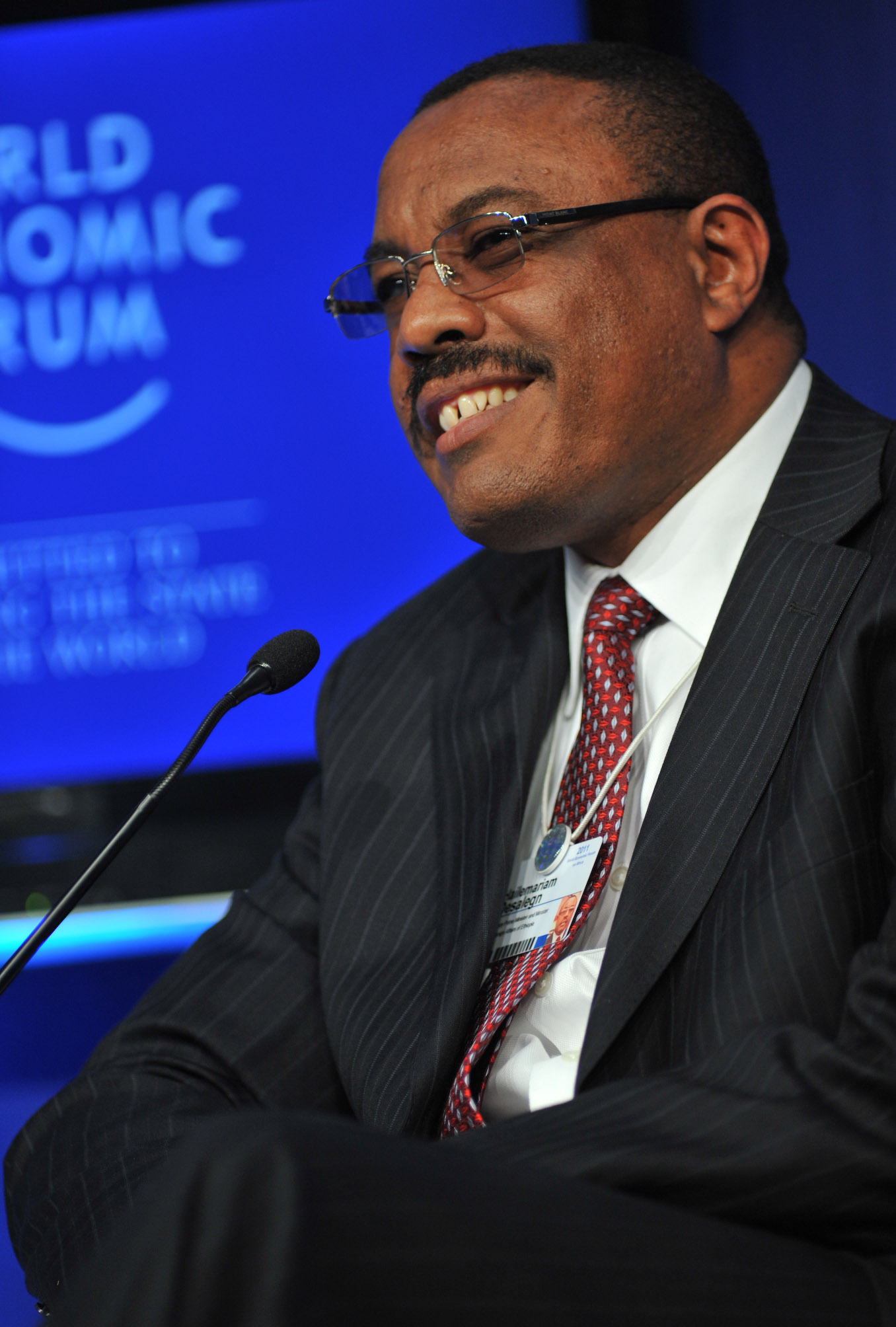
Hailemariam in Closing Plenary: Africa's Next Chapter - World Economic Forum on Africa 2011

Following the death of Ethiopia's longtime prime minister Meles Zenawi on 20 August 2012, Deputy Prime Minister Hailemariam was appointed the acting premier. Hailemariam became the permanent Prime Minister on 21 September 2012.

European Parliament president Martin Schulz, after meeting with Hailemariam, said that his desire "to strengthen democracy in the country, allowing for greater pluralism and a freer civil society, to uphold the freedoms enshrined in the Ethiopian Constitution" was clear.

==== Ethiopia-Somalia cooperative agreements ====
In February 2014, Hailemariam met in Addis Ababa with a visiting delegation from Somalia led by Somali Prime Minister Abdiweli Sheikh Ahmed to discuss strengthening bilateral relations between the two countries. Hailemariam pledged his administration's continued support for the peace and stabilization efforts in Somalia, as well as its preparedness to assist in initiatives aiming to build up the Somali security forces through experience-sharing and training. He also suggested that Ethiopia and Somalia should increase bilateral trade and investment. Additionally, Hailemariam described the growing ties between both nations as a break from the counter-productive policies of past administrations, marking instead of the opening of a new chapter where mutual stability is beneficial. For his part, Ahmed commended Ethiopia's role in the ongoing peace and stabilization process in Somalia as well as its support against the Al-Shabaab militant group. He likewise welcomed the Ethiopian military's decision to join AMISOM. The meeting concluded with a tripartite Memorandum of Understanding agreeing to promote partnership and cooperation, including a cooperative agreement to develop the police force, a second cooperative agreement covering the information field, and a third cooperative agreement on the aviation sector.

==== Economic policy ====
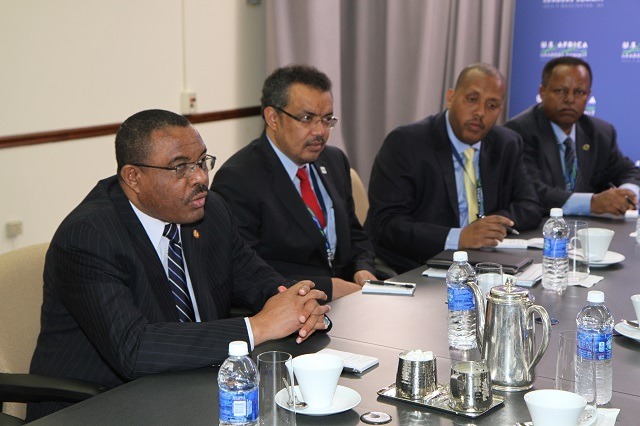
Hailemariam with Tedros Adhanom and Getachew Reda during the meeting with Seychelles' delegation in the margins of the U.S. Africa Leaders Summit in Washington, August 2014

Hailemariam Desalegn sustained economic progress in Ethiopia after the sudden death of his predecessor in 2012. He played role to complete the implementation of the Growth and Transformation Plan (GTP I) and to start with GTP II. Between 2012 and 2018, major projects like Hawassa and Mekelle industrial park, Addis Ababa Light Rail, Gilgel Gibe III Dam, the new Addis Ababa–Djibouti Railway, as well as Bahir Dar Stadium and other stadiums in Mekelle and Hawassa are completed. Hailemariam is accredited for the country's continued rapid and double-digit economic growth, and Hailemariam led Ethiopia to partner Kenya in the ambitious US$24.5bn Lamu Port Southern Sudan-Ethiopia Transport (LAPSSET) Corridor – which includes a railway, highways, and an oil pipeline – which will provide his landlocked country and South Sudan with a new export pathway and reduce Kenya's dependence on the heavily congested port of Mombasa. Moreover, Hailemariam has partnered Ethiopia with Djibouti to sign an agreement for a $1.55 billion fuel pipeline with developers Mining, Oil & Gas Services and Blackstone Group LP-backed Black Rhino Group. Both countries which are in the Horn of Africa signed framework agreements in September 2015 for construction of the 550-kilometer (340-mile) line to transport diesel, gasoline and jet fuel from port access in Djibouti to central Ethiopia. The joint project construction is scheduled for completion in two years.

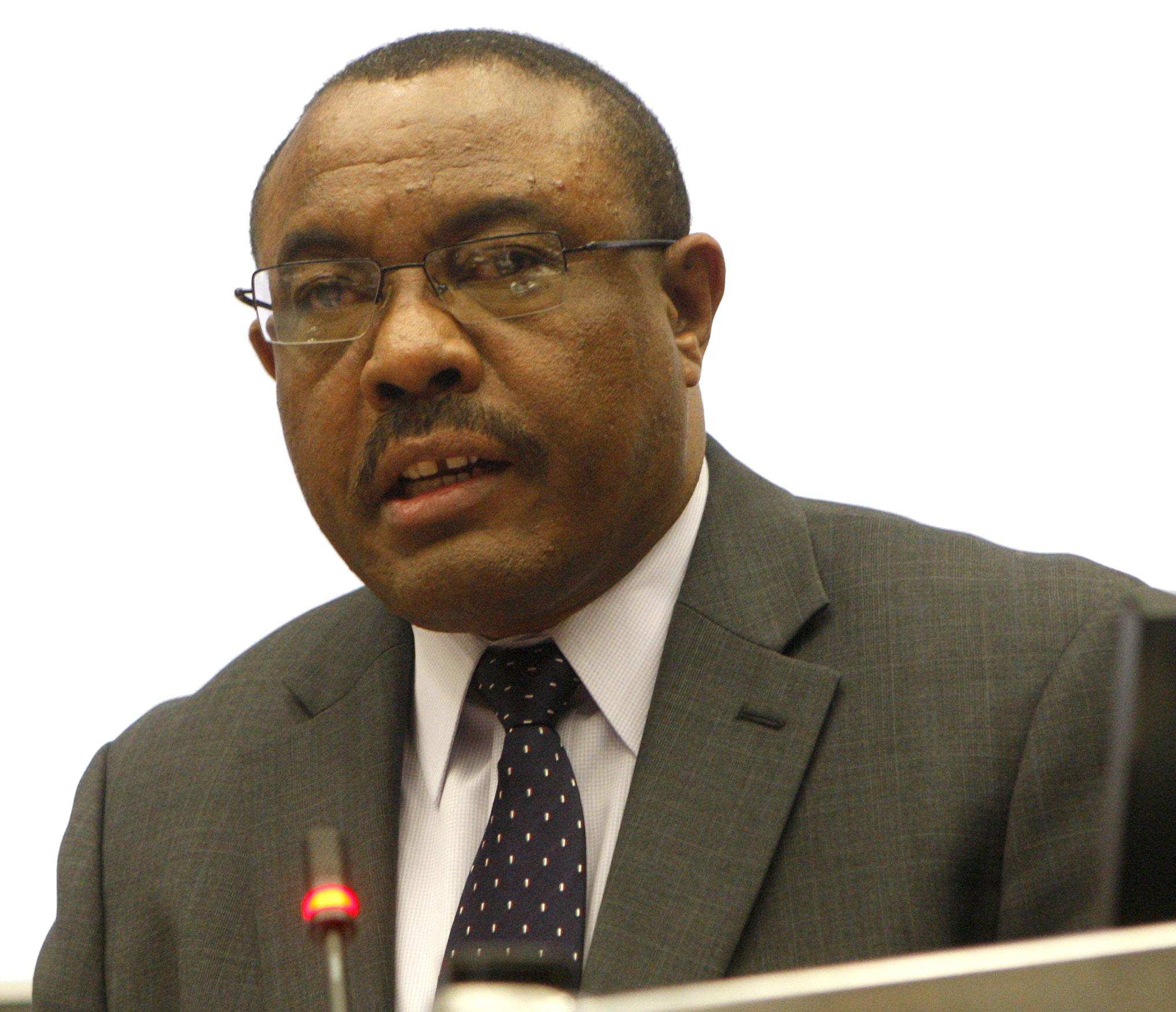
Hailemariam in November 2014 at the Second UNIDO forum in Vienna

Hailemariam continued with the ambitious projects like the Ethiopian Electric Power Corporation construction of the Grand Ethiopian Renaissance Dam, which was launched by his predecessor, Meles Zenawi. Financially, Hailemariam's government welcomed its first sovereign credit ratings from global agencies in 2014 – a B1 from Moody's and B ratings from both Fitch and Standard & Poor's, which opened the door to international capital markets and foreign direct investment. However, the foreign investment capital comes from China, which has committed hundreds of millions of dollars in loans and grants to assist the government-owned corporations’ ambitious initiatives, as well as other capital intensive projects like roads, bridges and railways.

==== Resignation ====
Announcement of Hailemariam resignation 15 February 2018

On 14 February 2018, Hailemariam Desalegn announced his resignation as prime minister and chairman of EPRDF in a televised address and submitted letter to the SEPDM and EPRDF, who finally accept the letter. His resignation made him the first leader to do so in the country's recent history. He stated that the resignation is "vital in the bid to carry out reforms that would lead to sustainable peace and democracy", linked to the 2014–2016 unrest in Oromia Region, in which hundreds were killed by government crackdown in Oromia and Amhara Region in between 2015 and 2016.

Hailemariam's announcement came amid a political crisis and lingering unrest in the Horn of Africa country, which had been releasing thousands of political prisoners to ease tensions. "Unrest and a political crisis have led to the loss of lives and displacement of many," he added, however, that he would stay on as prime minister in a caretaker capacity until the EPRDF and parliament accepted his resignation and elected Abiy Ahmed as the new prime minister on 2 April.

== Post-premiership ==
In 2025, Hailemariam was appointed as a mediator by the East African Community and the Southern African Development Community in the Democratic Republic of the Congo amid the M23 campaign (2022–present).

== Co-Founding HRF ==
The Hailemariam and Roman Foundation (HRF), co-founded in April 2018 by Hailemariam Dessalegn, the former Prime Minister of Ethiopia, and Roman Tesfaye, the former First Lady of Ethiopia, is an international non-profit organization headquartered in Addis Ababa, Ethiopia.

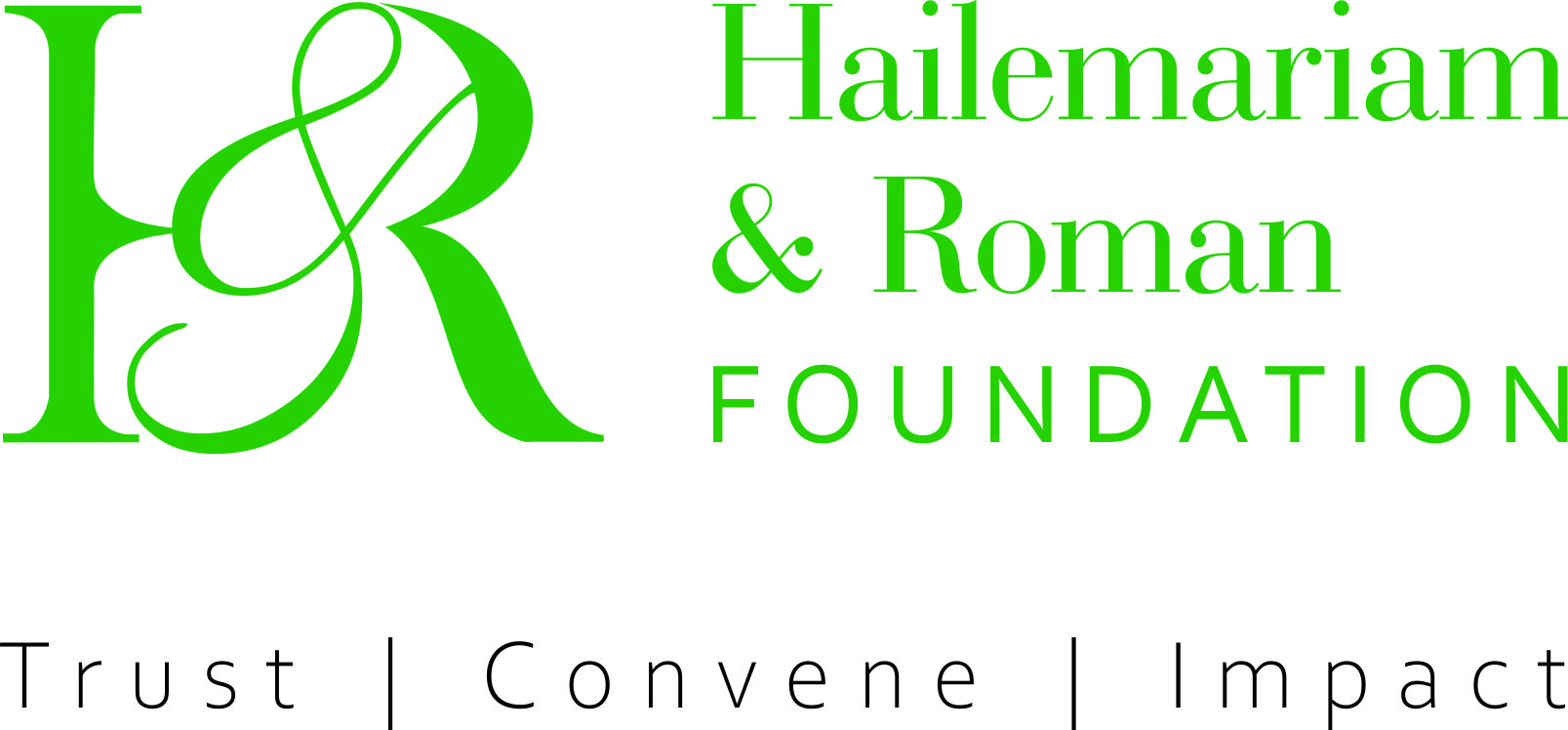
HRF Logo

The Foundation aims to promote socioeconomic transformation in Ethiopia and continental Africa through partnerships with governments, communities, and international development actors. Its vision is to build “a healthy and economically empowered community in a well-conserved environment.”

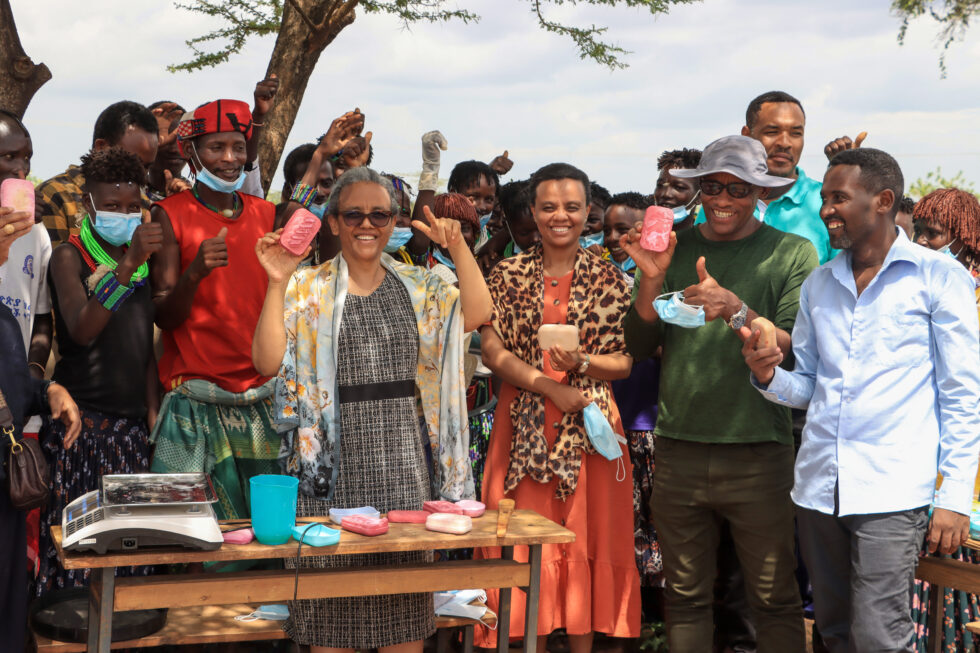
H.E. Roman Tesfaye, former First Lady of Ethiopia and CEO of HRF, along with HRF's Deputy CEO, Dr. Sosina Hailemariam, and ‘YES’ Project team and participants in South Omo Zone, Ethiopia, May 2025

HRF operates across several key thematic areas, including climate-smart conservation, ecotourism, maternal and child health, women and youth economic empowerment, and sustainable agriculture.

The Foundation's strategy is centered on three pillars: advocacy, joint model initiatives, and capability building.

== Board membership ==
Hailemariam is a member of the board of numerous international organizations such as International Crisis Group, Alliance for a Green Revolution in Africa, Tana High Level Forum on Security in Africa, Brenthurst Foundation, IBA Ethiopia Center for Innovation, and the Ethiopian Reconciliation Commission. Prime Minister of Ethiopia (2012–18); chair, Ethiopian People's Revolutionary Democratic Front (2012–18); Deputy Prime Minister and Minister of Foreign Affairs (2010–12); Advisor to Prime Minister with the rank of Minister (2007–2010); chair, African Union (2013–14); University lecturer and Dean, Arba Minch University for 12 years; Vice President and President of the Southern Nations Nationalities and Peoples’ Regional State (2001–06). Currently: Board Chair, Alliance for a Green Revolution in Africa; Founder and Board Chair, Hailemariam and Roman Foundation; Board Chair, Tourism Ethiopia; Board of Trustees, International Crisis Group; Advisory Board Member, The Brenthurst Foundation; Member of Parliament for 21 years; Member of different professional Associations.

== Board Chair, Alliance for a Green Revolution in Africa (AGRA): 2019-present ==
In August 2019, Hailemariam Dessalegn was appointed as the chair of the Board of Aliance for a Green Revolution in Africa (AGRA), an African-led organization focused on increasing food security through agriculture reforms and improving the livelihoods of smallholder farmers across the continent. He succeeded Strive Masiyiwa, who held the position from 2013 to 2019.

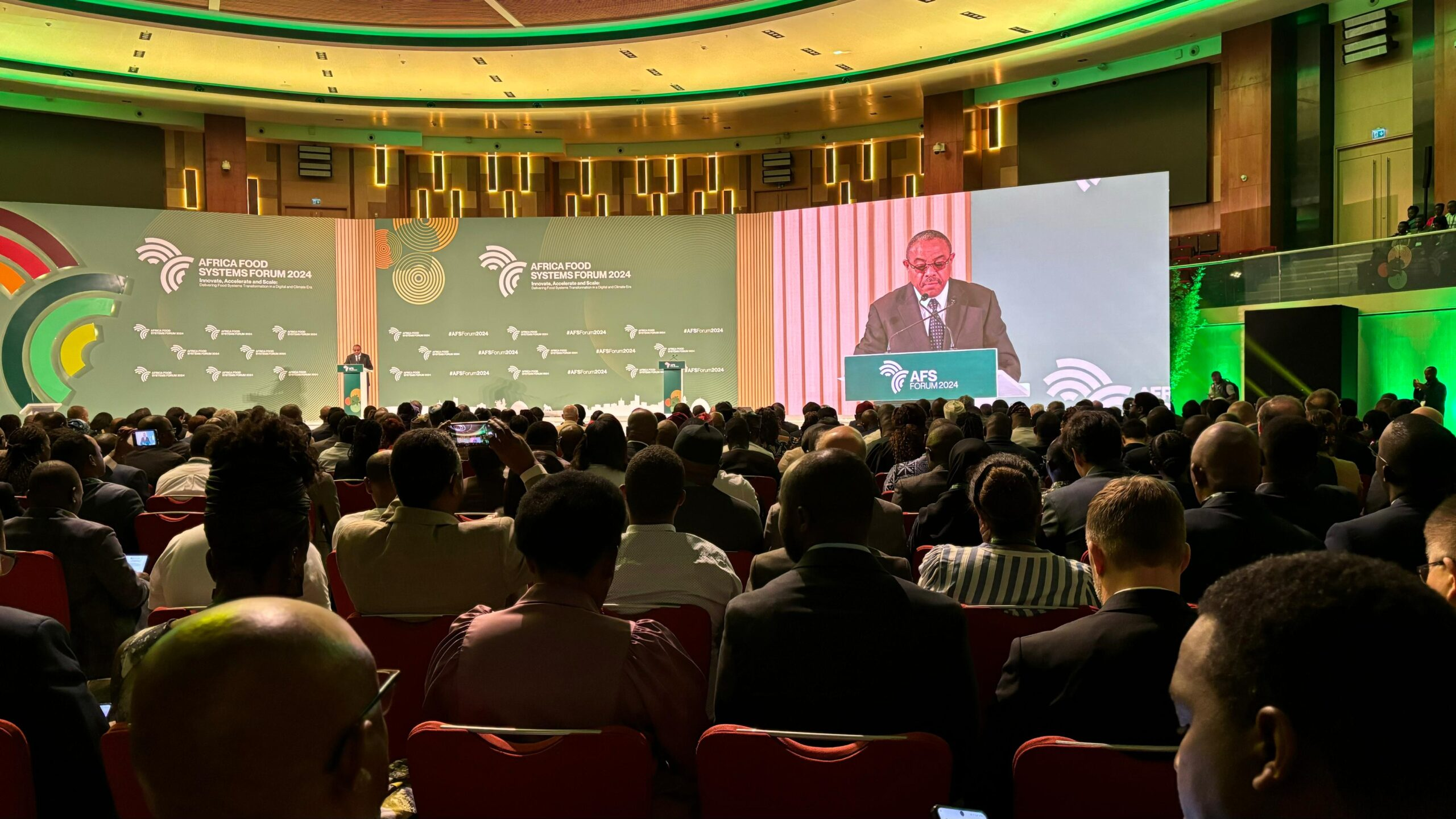
AGRA Board Chair, H.E. Hailemariam Dessalegn, delivering a welcoming speech at the Africa Food Systems Forum 2024 in Kigali, Rwanda, 2–6 September 2024

In 2023, while speaking as the chair of the board at AGRA, he called on Ghanaian lawmakers and international partners to step up their support for food systems transformation, emphasizing its potential to boost livelihoods and food security.

== Board Chair, TradeMark Africa (TMA): 2024-present ==
In early 2024, Hailemariam Dessalegn was appointed board chair of TradeMark Africa (TMA), an aid-for-trade organization headquartered in Nairobi, Kenya which has a particular focus on implementing the African Continental Free Trade Area (AfCFTA).

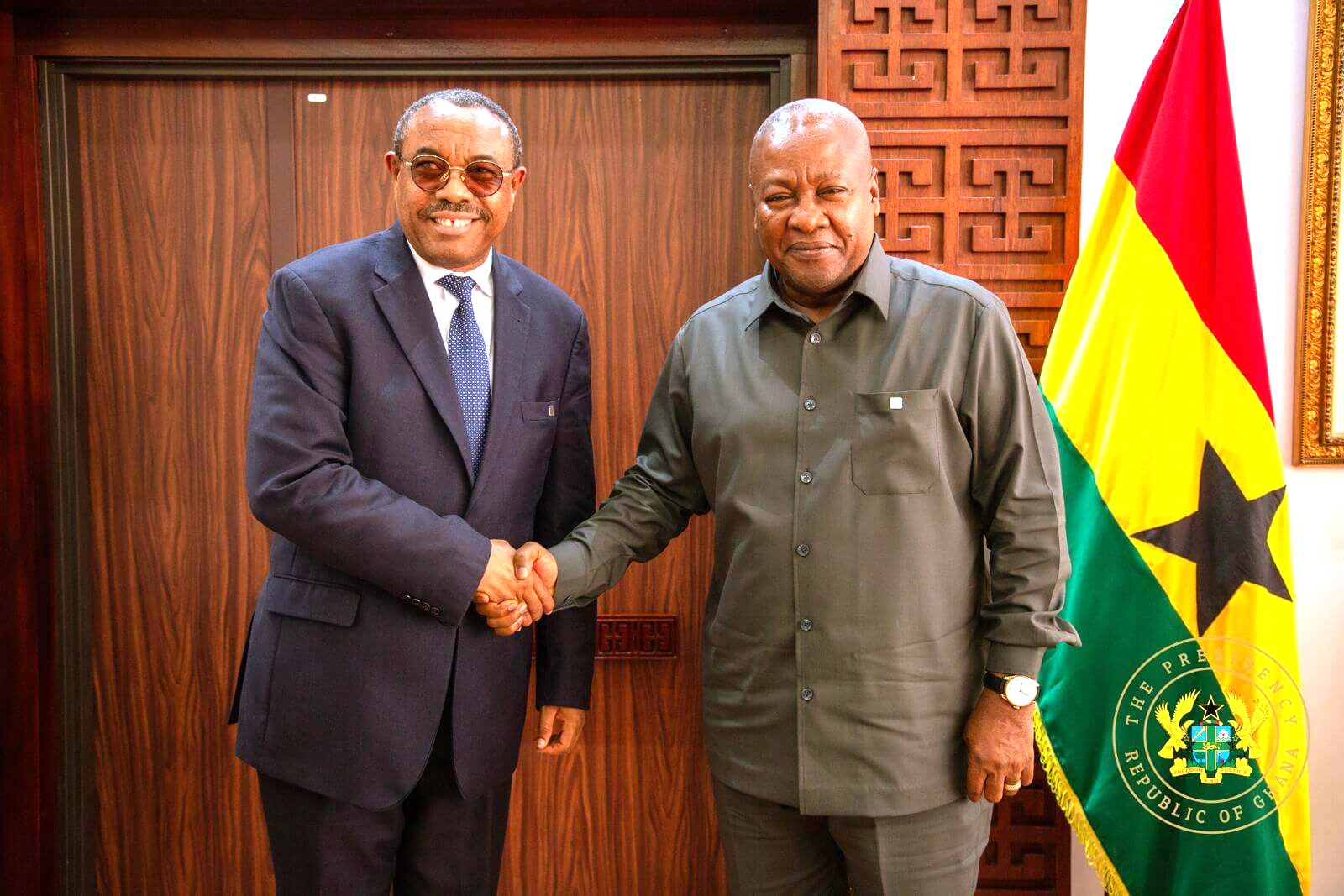
On March 19, 2025, H.E. Hailemariam Dessalegn, TMA Board Chair and former Prime Minister of Ethiopia, met with H.E. John Mahama, President of Ghana, at the Flagstaff House in Accra to discuss trade facilitation, regional integration, and AfCFTA alignment with Ghana's priorities.

== Honours and awards ==
=== Romanian Parliament Medal (2015) ===
In July 2015, Hailemariam Dessalegn received the Romanian Parliament Medal for his outstanding contributions to international diplomacy. The award also recognized Ethiopia's designation as the World's Best Tourist Destination and Favorite Cultural Destination.

=== World Leader of Tourism & Honorary Member of the European Tourism Academy (2015) ===
Hailemariam was also named a World Leader of Tourism and became an honorary member of the European Tourism Academy in July 2015. The recognition was conferred by the European Council on Tourism and Trade in appreciation of his role in promoting Ethiopia's tourism sector.

=== AfricaWorld Man of the Year (2015) ===
In the same year, AfricaWorld News, a Pan-African magazine, selected Hailemariam Dessalegn as Man of the Year for 2015. The award recognized his leadership as Prime Minister of Ethiopia and his contribution to African development and diplomacy.

=== Honorary Professorship, University of International Business and Economics ( 2017) ===
On May 14, 2017, Hailemariam was awarded an honorary professorship by the University of International Business and Economics (UIBE) in Beijing. The title acknowledged his efforts to strengthen academic partnerships and support the Belt and Road Initiative.

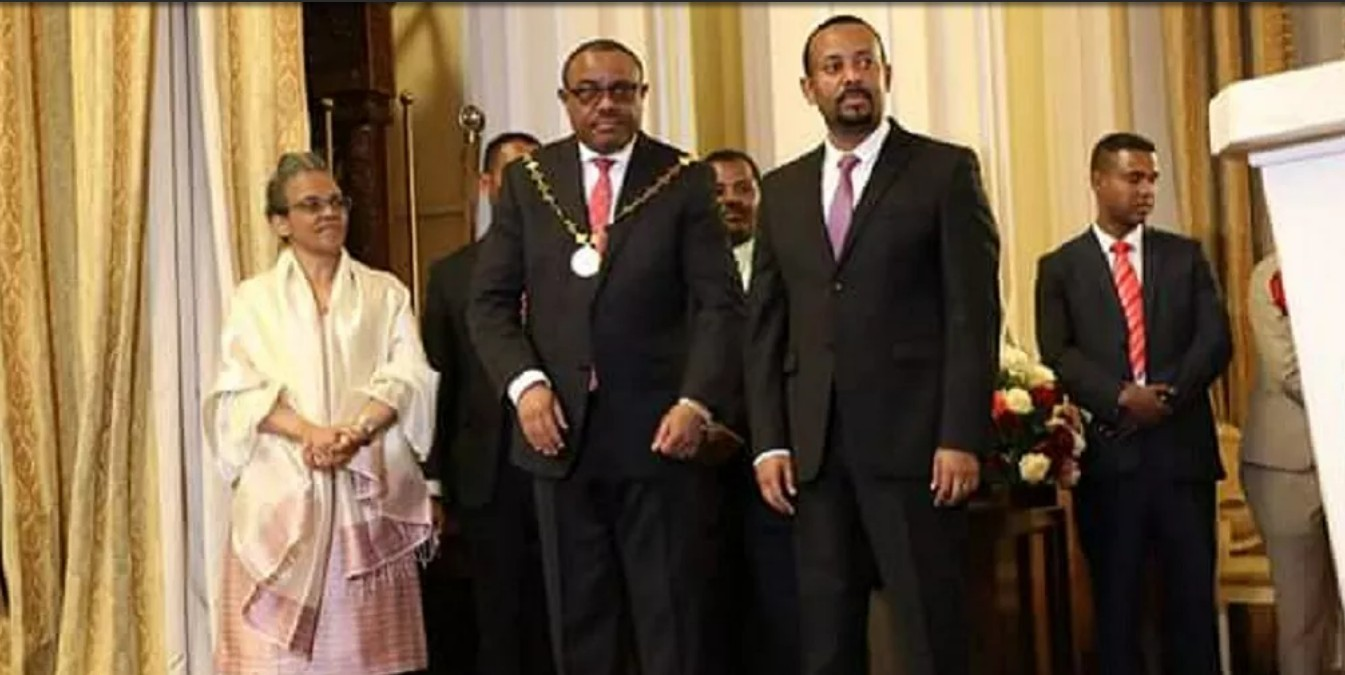
Ethiopia bestowed the highest national honour on H.E. Hailemariam Dessalegn on April 24, 2018.

=== Ethiopia's Highest National Honor (2018) ===
On April 24, 2018, Hailemariam received Ethiopia's highest national honor, a ceremonial medal and citation, at a farewell ceremony held at the National Palace in Addis Ababa. The award was presented by Prime Minister Abiy Ahmed in appreciation of his leadership and peaceful handover of power.

=== Grand Cordon of the Order of the Rising Sun (2019) ===
In August 2019, the Government of Japan honored Hailemariam with the Grand Cordon of the Order of the Rising Sun, recognizing his contribution to Ethiopia–Japan bilateral relations and peace promotion across Africa.

=== Gifata Award (2019) ===
In September 2019, Hailemariam received the Gifata Award during the Gifaataa New Year festival in Wolayita Sodo. The award, conferred by the Wolayta people of South Ethiopia Regional State, honored his political leadership and academic achievements.

== See also ==
- List of heads of government of Ethiopia
- 2016 Ethiopian protests

== Notes ==
Political offices
Preceded by Abate Kisho	President of the Southern Nations, Nationalities, and Peoples' Region; 2001–2006	Succeeded by Shiferaw Shigute
Preceded by Addisu Legesse	Deputy Prime Minister of Ethiopia; 2010–2012	Succeeded by Demeke Mekonnen; Debretsion Gebremichael; Muktar Kedir
Preceded by Seyoum Mesfin	Minister of Foreign Affairs; 2010–2012	Succeeded by Tedros Adhanom Ghebreyesus
Preceded by Meles Zenawi	Prime Minister of Ethiopia; 2012–2018	Succeeded by Abiy Ahmed
Party political offices
Preceded by Meles Zenawi	Leader of the Ethiopian People's Revolutionary Democratic Front; 2012–2018	Succeeded by Abiy Ahmed
Diplomatic posts
Preceded by Yayi Boni	Chairperson of the African Union; 2013–2014	Succeeded by Mohamed Ould Abdel Aziz
