= Council of Ministers of Abiy Ahmed =

Government of Ethiopia since 2018

Abiy Ahmed cabinet
- Cabinet of Ethiopia
- Abiy Ahmed
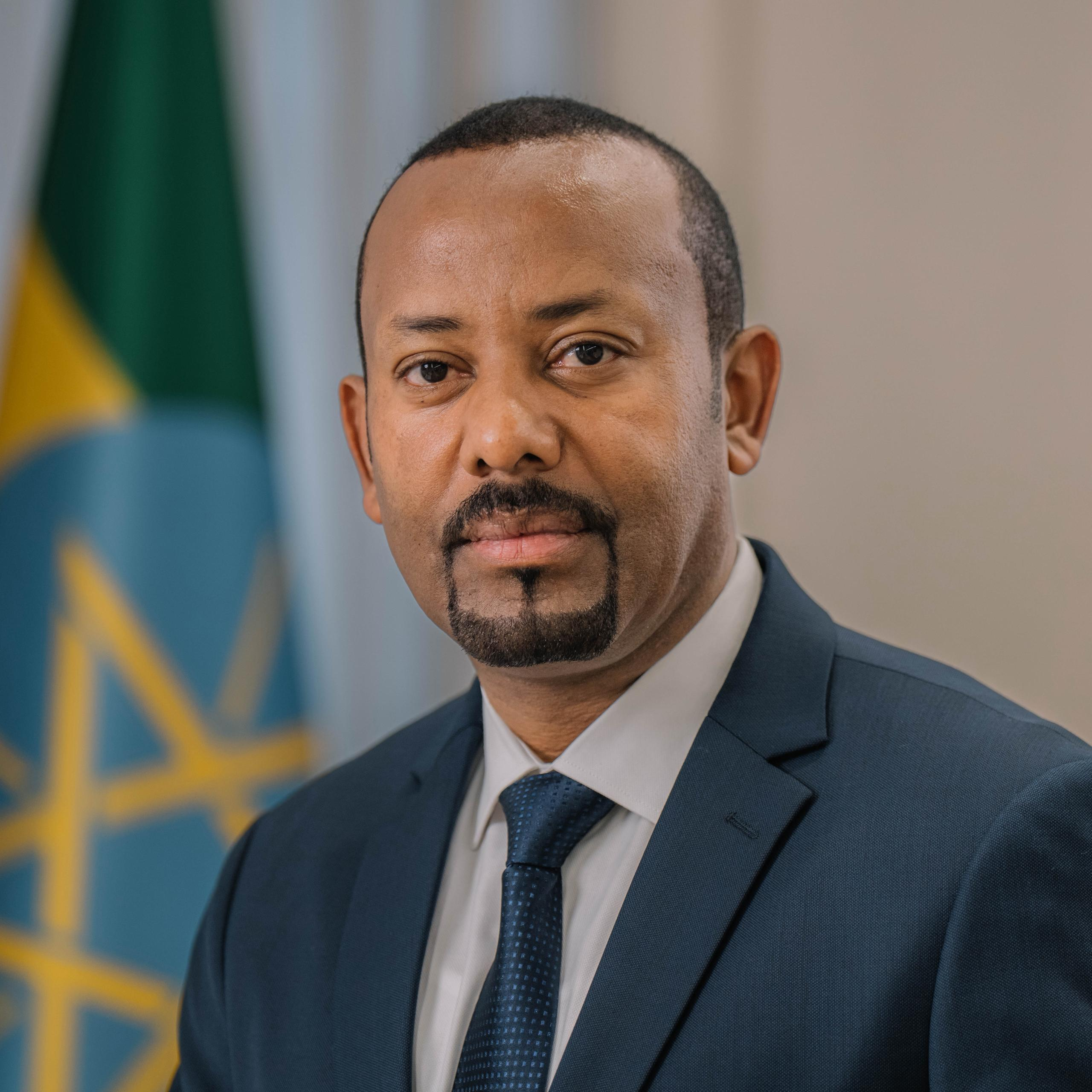
- Abiy in 2025
- Date formed: 16 October 2018

People and organisations
- President: Mulatu Teshome (until 25 October 2018); Sahle-Work Zewde (until 7 October 2024); Taye Atskeselassie (from 7 October 2024)
- Prime Minister: Abiy Ahmed
- Deputy Prime Ministers: Temesgen Tiruneh; Adem Farah
- Total no. of members: 20
- Member party: EPRDF (Until 2019); Prosperity Party (From 2019)
- Status in legislature: Supermajority
- Opposition parties: National Movement of Amhara; Ethiopian Citizens for Social Justice; Gedeo People's Democratic Party

History
- Elections: 2021 general election 2026 general election
- Outgoing election: 6 October 2021
- Budget: 786.61 billion birr (2022/2023)
- Predecessor: Hailemariam cabinet

The Council of Ministers of Abiy Ahmed is the cabinet of the government of Ethiopia during the premiership of Abiy Ahmed since early 2018.

== Cabinet reshuffles and resignations ==
=== Pre-election ===
The Abiy cabinet of October 2018 was gender-balanced, with half the ministers being women, including several in senior security ministries, with Aisha Mohammed Mussa as Minister of Defense and Muferiat Kamil in the newly created Ministry of Peace, which was allocated responsibility for several security services. The number of ministers was reduced from 28 to 20. The other eight women ministers were Adanech Abebe, Dagmawit Moges, Ergoge Tesfaye, Fetlework Gebregziabher, Fitsum Assefa, Hirut Kassaw, Hirut Woldemariam and Yalem Tsegaye Asfaw.

In April 2019, Gedu Andargachew became Foreign Minister.

A January 2020 reshuffle replaced Fetlework Gebregziabher, a Tigray People's Liberation Front (TPLF) member, by Melaku Alebel as Minister of Trade and Industry, and shifted Getahun Mekuria from Innovation and Technology to Education.

A March 2020 reshuffle included shifting Adanech Abebe from a Minister to Ethiopia's first woman Attorney-General. The reshuffle included two new women ministers, promoting Lia Tadesse from State Minister for Health to Minister for Health, and Filsan Abdullahi became the Minister of Women, Children, and Youth. Some members of parliament viewed the reshuffle as reducing the representativity of Tigrayans, while member of parliament Tesfaye Daba stated that Lia Tadesse was partially of Tigrayan origin. Lake Ayalew became Minister of Revenue.

In November 2020, Demeke Mekonnen replaced Gedu Andargachew as Foreign Minister.

Filsan Abdi resigned from her ministership in September 2021 in relation to governmental obstruction of the publishing of a full report on sexual violence in the Tigray War.

=== Post-2021 election ===
Following the 2021 Ethiopian general election, in which the Prosperity Party won an overwhelming majority of seats, a major reshuffle of the Cabinet took place in October 2021. Three opponents to the Prosperity Party were appointed as ministers. Berhanu Nega of Rainbow Ethiopia: Movement for Democracy and Social Justice became Minister of Education; Belete Molla of National Movement of Amhara (NaMA) became Minister of Innovation and Technology; and Kejella Merdassa, a former member of the Oromo Liberation Front (OLF) became Minister of Culture and Sports. Control of twenty intelligence, security, financial and other institutions was given directly to the prime minister.

On 8 February 2024, Demeke was replaced by Temesgen Tiruneh as Foreign Minister.

=== Post-2026 election ===
On 5 October 2026, following the Prosperity Party winning 90% of the federal parliamentary seats in the 2026 Ethiopian general election, Abiy Ahmed started a new term as prime minister. On 8 October, Abiy proposed a 22-member cabinet of ministers to Parliament.

== Members ==
The Abiy cabinet has included:

Cabinet
Office	Name	Dates	Refs.
Prime Minister	Abiy Ahmed	April 2018–present	
Deputy Prime Minister	Demeke Mekonnen	Sept 2012– Jan 2024	
Deputy Prime Minister	Temesgen Tiruneh	Feb 2024–present	
Minister of Foreign Affairs	Workneh Gebeyehu	Oct 2018– 8 Mar 2019	
Minister of Foreign Affairs	Gedu Andargachew	Apr 2019– Nov 2020	
Minister of Foreign Affairs	Demeke Mekonnen	Nov 2020–Feb 2024	
Minister of Foreign Affairs	Taye Atske Selassie	Feb 2024–Oct 2024	
Minister of Foreign Affairs	Gedion Timothewos	Oct 2024–present	
Minister of National Defense
Minister of National Defense	Motuma Mekassa	April 2018–Oct 2018	
Minister of National Defense	Aisha Mohammed Mussa	Oct 2018–Apr 2019	
Minister of National Defense	Lemma Megersa	Apr 2019–Aug 2020	
Minister of National Defense	Kenea Yadeta	Aug 2020– Oct 2021	
Minister of National Defense	Abraham Belay	Oct 2021–?	
Minister of National Defense	Mohammed Idris	Oct 2026–present	
Minister of Public Service and Human Resource Development	Tagesse Chafo		
Minister of Public Service and Human Resource Development	Fekadu Tesema	Oct 2021–present	
Attorney General	Berhanu Tsegaye	Oct 2018–Mar 2020	
Attorney General	Adanech Abebe	Mar 2020–present	
Attorney General	Gedion Timotheos		
Minister of Health	Amir Aman	Oct 2018–Mar 2020	
Minister of Health	Lia Tadesse	Mar 2020–?	
Minister of Health	Mekdes Daba	Oct 2026–present	
Ministry of Innovation and Technology	Getahun Mekuria	Oct 2018–Jan 2020	
Ministry of Innovation and Technology	Oubah Mohammed (Comm. Inf. Tech.)		
Ministry of Innovation and Technology	Abraham Belay	Feb 2020–Oct 2021	
Ministry of Innovation and Technology	Belete Molla	Oct 2021–present	
Ministry of Innovation and Technology	Frehiwot Tamiru	Oct 2026–present	
Minister of Finance and Economic Development or Finance	Ahmed Shide	Oct 2018–?	
Minister of Finance and Economic Development or Finance	Fitsum Assefa	Oct 2026–present	
Minister of Government Communication Affairs Office	Ahmed Shide		
Minister of Transport and Communications or Logistics	Siraj Fergessa	April 2018–June 2018	
Minister of Transport and Communications or Logistics	Dagmawit Moges (Transp.)	Oct 2018–Jan 2023	
Minister of Transport and Communications or Logistics	Alemu Sime (Transport and Logistics minister)	Jan 2023–?	
Minister of Transport and Communications or Logistics	Sadat Nesha (Logistics)	Oct 2026–present	
Minister of Education	Tilaye Gete	Oct 2018–Jan 2020	
Minister of Education	Getahun Mekuria	Feb 2020–Oct 2021	
Minister of Education	Berhanu Nega	Oct 2021–present	
Minister of Science and Higher Education	Hirut Woldemariam	Oct 2018–Aug 2020	
Minister of Science and Higher Education	Samuel Urkato	Aug 2020–Oct 2021	
Minister of Science and Higher Education	(merged into MoE)		
Minister of Peace	Muferiat Kamil	Oct 2018–Oct 2021	
Minister of Peace	Binalf Andualem	Oct 2021–Nov 2024	
Minister of Peace	Mohamed Idris	Nov 2024–?	
Minister of Peace	Musa Adem	Oct 2026–present	
Minister of Trade and Industry	Ambachew Mekonnen (Industry)	April 2018–Oct 2018	
Minister of Trade and Industry	Fetlework Gebregziabher	Oct 2018–Jan 2020	
Minister of Trade and Industry	Melaku Alebel (Trade)	Jan 2020–?	
Minister of Trade and Industry	Yasmin Wohabrebbi	Oct 2026–present (Trade and Regional Integration)	
Minister of Agriculture
Minister of Agriculture	Shiferaw Shigute	April 2018–Oct 2018	
Minister of Agriculture	Omer Hussein	Oct 2018–Jan 2023	
Minister of Agriculture	Girma Amente	Jan 2023–?	
Minister of Agriculture	Addisu Arega	Oct 2026–present	
Minister of Urban Development and Construction	Jantirar Abay (Urb. Dev., Housing)	October 2018 – 18 April 2019	
Minister of Urban Development and Construction	Aisha Mohammed (Construction)	18 April 2019 – 6 October 2021	
Minister of Urban Development and Construction	Chaltu Sani (Urban and Infrastructure)	6 October 2021–?	
Minister of Urban Development and Construction	Mohammed Abdurahman	Oct 2026–present	
Minister of Mines and Petroleum	Samuel Urkato	Oct 2018–	
Minister of Mines and Petroleum	Melese Alemu		
Minister of Mines and Petroleum	Takele Uma Banti	Aug 2020–Jan 2023	
Minister of Mines and Petroleum	Habtamu Tegegne	Jan 2023–?	
Minister of Mines and Petroleum	Alemtsahay Paulos (Mining)	Oct 2026–present	
Minister of Water, Irrigation and Electricity	Seleshi Bekele	Oct 2018–Oct 2021	
Minister of Water, Irrigation and Electricity	Habtamu Iteffa Geleta	Oct 2021–?	
Minister of Water, Irrigation and Electricity	Habtamu Itefa (Water and Energy)	Oct 2026–present	
Minister of Labor and Social Affairs	Ergoge Tesfaye	Oct 2018–Oct 2021	
Minister of Labor and Social Affairs	Muferiat Kamil	Oct 2021–present	
Minister of Labor and Social Affairs	Awelu Abdi (Labor and Skills)	Oct 2026–present	
Minister of Women, Children and Youth	Yalem Tsegaye (Women, Children)	Oct 2018–March 2020	
Minister of Women, Children and Youth	Ristu Yirdaw (Youth, Sport)		
Minister of Women, Children and Youth	Filsan Abdullahi	Mar 2020–Sep 2021	
Minister of Women, Children and Youth	Ergoge Tesfaye (Women & Social Affairs)	Oct 2021–?	
Minister of Women, Children and Youth	Shewit Shanka (Women & Social Affairs)	Oct 2026–present	
Minister of Women, Children and Youth	Aklilu Tadesse (Youth & Sports)	Oct 2026–present	
Minister of Culture and Tourism	Fozia Amin		
Minister of Culture and Tourism	Hirut Kassaw	Oct 2018–Oct 2021	
Minister of Culture and Tourism	Kajela Merdassa	Oct 2021–July 2024	
Minister of Culture and Tourism	Nassise Chali (Tourism)	Oct 2021–present	
Minister of Culture and Tourism	Shewit Shanka (Culture & Sports)	July 2024-?	
Minister of Culture and Tourism	Selamawit Kassa	Oct 2026–present	
Minister of Revenues and Customs Authority	Adanech Abebe	Oct 2018–Mar 2020	
Minister of Revenues and Customs Authority	Omer Hussien		
Minister of Revenues and Customs Authority	Lake Ayalew	Mar 2020–Aug 2020	
Minister of Revenues and Customs Authority	Aynalem Nigussie	Aug 2020–?	
Commissioner of National Planning Commission	Yinager Dese		
Commissioner of National Planning Commission	Fitsum Assefa	Oct 2018–?	
