= Council of Ministers (Ethiopia) =

Executive body of the government of Ethiopia

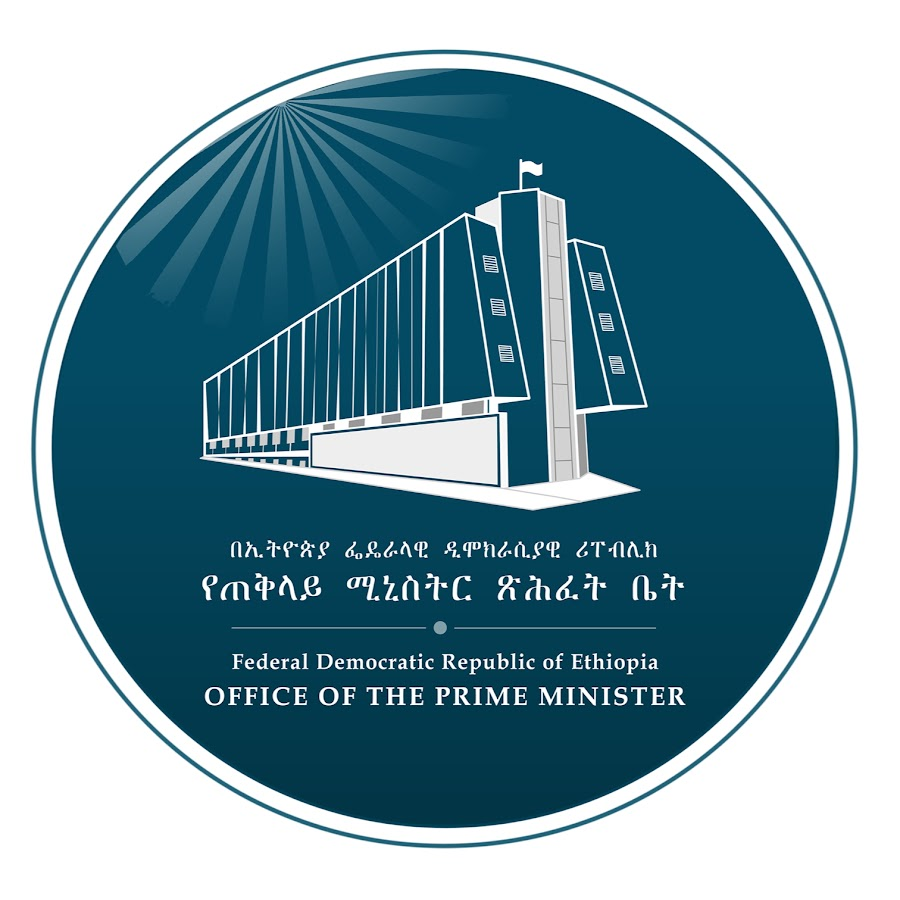

Overview
- Established: 1995
- Leader: Prime Minister
- Appointed by: Federal Parliamentary Assembly
- Annual budget: 16.59% (2022/2023)
- Headquarters: 506 Mozambique St, Addis Ababa, Ethiopia
- Website: pmo.gov.et/council/

The Council of Ministers is the cabinet of the Government of Ethiopia. Under the Constitution of Ethiopia, the Council of Ministers is the country's executive body.

== History ==
=== Meles cabinets ===
- Council of Ministers of Meles Zenawi (2005–2012)

=== Hailemariam cabinets ===
- Council of Ministers of Hailemariam Desalegn (2012–2018)

=== Abiy cabinets ===
- Council of Ministers of Abiy Ahmed (2018–present)

== Current cabinet ==
As of 6 October 2021 and/or the dates of the sources listed in the entries below, the cabinet is listed below. The history of the Abiy Ahmed cabinets is at Council of Ministers of Abiy Ahmed.

Cabinet
Office (Constituting instrument)	Incumbent
Prime Minister of Ethiopia	Abiy Ahmed
Deputy Prime Minister of Ethiopia	Temesgen Tiruneh
Minister of Foreign Affairs	Gedion Timotheos
Minister of Defense	Abraham Belay
Minister of Finance	Ahmed Shide
Minister of Justice	Hanna Arayaselassie
Minister of Peace	Mohammed Idris
Minister of Education	Berhanu Nega
Minister of Health	Mekdes Daba
Ministry of Innovation and Technology	Belete Molla
Ministry of Transport and Logistics	Alemu Sime
Minister of Industry	Melaku Alebel
Ministry of Trade and Regional Integration	Gebremeskel Chala
Minister of Revenues	Ayenalem Nigusse
Minister of Planning and Development	Fitsum Assefa
Minister of Water and Energy	Habtamu Itefa
Minister of Mines and Petroleum	Habtamu Tegegn
Minister of Tourism	Selamawit kassa
Minister of Agriculture	Addisu Arega Kitessa
Minister of Irrigation and Lowland Areas Development	Aisha Mohammed Mussa
Minister of Urban development and Infrastructure	Chaltu Sani
Ministry of Labour and Skills Development	Muferiat Kamil
Ministry of Women and Social Affairs	Ergoge Tesfaye
Minister of Culture and Sport	Shewit Shanka

=== Cabinet-level officials ===
The Prime Minister may appoint additional positions to be members of the Cabinet;

Cabinet-level officials
Office (Constituting instrument)	Incumbent
National Security Affairs Advisor to the Prime Minister of Ethiopia	Gedu Andargachew
Director General of The National Intelligence and Security Service	Temesgen Tiruneh
Chief Negotiator & Advisor on Transboundary Rivers and GERD to the Prime Minister of Ethiopia	Seleshi Bekele
Prime Minister Office Chief of Staff and Head of Cabinet Affairs	Teferi Fikre
Prime Minister Office Head of Political Affairs Office	Adem Farah
Prime Minister Office Chief Coordinator of Political Affairs	Abraham Alehegn
FDRE Government Communication Service	Legesse Tulu
Government Representative in the House of People's Representatives	Tesfaye Beljige
