= Murder of Heaven Awot =

2023 murder and rape in Ethiopia

- Date: August 2023
- Location: Bahir Dar, Amhara Region, Ethiopia
- Type: Rape; Mutilation; Murder
- Deaths: Heaven Awot
- Convicted: Getnet Baye
- Sentence: Getnet Baye sentenced to 25 years in prison The case adjourned until October 2024

Heaven Awot, a seven-year-old girl was brutally raped, mutilated and killed by her mother's landlord Getnet Baye in Bahir Dar, Amhara Region, Ethiopia in August 2023. Getnet was sentenced to 25 years in prison. The murder has heavily sparked public outrage, who demand appropriate punishment for the assailant, and circulated in social media. Getnet appealed to the court and the case adjourned until October 2024.

Several women's and children right organizations voiced condemnation for the murder. Among those, the Ethiopian Women Lawyers Association (EWLA) said the "murder by itself should have been enough to sentence him to life imprisonment or to death…". The Minister for Women and Social Affairs Ergoge Tesfaye also condemned the murder by saying "inhumane" in her Facebook page.

== Background ==
Heaven Awot was a seven-year-old girl from Bahir Dar in Amhara Region. Her family was separated during the conflict in Tigray. Heaven's father is an ethnic Tigrayan, who during the war, was imprisoned for several months. After being released from prison, he left Amhara Region to Tigray, as he believed he would raise suspicion in the region during ethnic profiling against Tigrayans. Heaven's mother, Abekyelesh Adeba, was a nurse who raised Heaven and her younger sister in a tenancy with landlord Getnet Baye. Abekyelesh told the BBC that she had never felt any threat to her daughter. She was related to the landlord's wife which made her feel even more at ease. At the time of the murder in August 2023, Abekyelesh was at work and the girl's aunt, a 15 year old guardian, was informed by Heaven that she was going to the bathroom and did not return.

Suspicious, the aunt attempted to find Heaven but was unsuccessful. Later that day, Heaven’s younger 3 year old sister found Heaven and informed the aunt about Heaven laying outside. The aunt found Heaven's body at the entrance of her home, her body strangled and mutilated, sand along with water and pebbles stuffed in her mouth. Her genitalia was completely torn and damaged so badly that one could easily see her spinal cord through it.

== Aftermath and reactions ==
The case was not publicized until the next year, sparking widespread public outrage in Ethiopia with many arguing the sentencing of the alleged perpetrator was too "merciful". More than 200,000 people signed a petition demanding appropriate justice for Getnet's alleged crime. Getnet was apprehended and sentenced to 25 years to life in prison. Following his sentence, Getnet appealed to the court, which adjourned the case until October 2024. Heaven's mother, Abekyelesh Adeba told the BBC that she felt "lifeless" after hearing of her death.

Heaven's death also created great outrage among women's and children's rights groups. The Ethiopian Women Lawyers Association (EWLA) released a statement stating the "murder by itself should have been enough to sentence him to life imprisonment or to death…". Similarly, the Minister for Women and Social Affairs Ergoge Tesfaye condemned the murder as "inhumane" on her Facebook page and said the office would investigate the case with stakeholders.
