= Kajela Merdassa =

Ethiopian politician

- Kejelaa Mardasaa

Minister of Culture and Sports
- In office 6 October 2021 – 3 July 2024
- President: Sahle-Work Zewde
- Prime Minister: Abiy Ahmed
- Preceded by: Hirut Kassaw
- Succeeded by: Shewit Shanka (Culture); Selamawit Kassa (Tourism)

Personal details
- Party: OLF (since 2020)

Kajela Merdassa (Oromo Kejelaa Mardasaa) is an Ethiopian politician and senior member of the Oromo Liberation Front (OLF). He was appointed Minister of Culture and Sports of Ethiopia on 6 October 2021 to 3 July 2024.

== Political career ==
Kajela has been a member of the Oromo Liberation Front (OLF) since 2020 or earlier. In 2020, as OLF public relations officer, he argued that change in the government of Oromia had not solved problems of human rights violations. He called on the government to follow a constitutional constraint of a five-year length of elected mandates.

In March 2021, in a factional split in the OLF between a faction led by chair Dawud Ibsa Ayana and one led by Ararso Bikila, Kajela sided with Ararso. The split was related to the question of whether or not to completely give up armed opposition. The Kajela–Ararso faction aimed to run candidates in the 2021 Ethiopian general election but did not qualify in time for deadlines set by the National Election Board of Ethiopia.

According to Borkena, Kajela stated that Aba Torbe is an OLF death squad.

Kajela attributed the killings in the March 2021 Ataye clashes in Oromia Zone in Amhara Region to governmental special forces.

In the October 2021 reshuffle of the Abiy Ahmed Cabinet, Kajela was made Minister of Culture and Sports.
