= Academic job market in Ethiopia =

Academic job market in Ethiopia is under development in every higher education institution. The government of Ethiopia is improving the quality of employment for university graduate students to achieve favorable market system and reduce poverty. This, however, obstructed by shortage of skilled manpower as higher education institutions produce graduate students every year.

According to the World Bank, the government had invested 42% of total education budget on employing mechanism over the last two decades. Nonetheless, unemployment rate is increasing: from 2.6% in 2014 to 6.61% in 2018. Preventions of proliferating unemployment rate includes creating various workshops and events, by organizing networking workshops that contacts students with prospective employees, providing curriculum vitae writing and skilled training for unemployed and public works.

== Status ==
In Ethiopia context, improving quality of the employment for university graduate students is the main goals to achieve favorable market system and reduce overall poverty. However, this is not sufficiently proved as the labor market experienced shortage of skilled manpower as higher education institutions produce dozens of graduate students in every year. Many graduates abandon jobs for a long time. There is also a shortage of labor market for unemployed individual in Ethiopia for a long time. Nonetheless, Ethiopia has increasing employability as higher education institution expanded for this purpose. The unemployment rate was 2.79%, a 0.75 increase from 2019. This is because of inequality between or within public universities and smaller non-profit private providers, many of which are doubtful.

The labor market weakness is due to adequate demand in the primary, secondary and tertiary sectors, a large number of workers are deemed surplus. According to the World Bank, the government had invested 42% of total education budget in higher education over the past two decades with expectation of high return from it. Graduates are able to repay their money after being hired in the labor market. Moreover, the government assured the implementation of 70:30 program mix direction, despite unemployment rate is increasing. For instance, graduate unemployment is relative to total unemployment increased from 2.6% in 2014 to 6.61% in 2018 in Ethiopia.

As of 2022, the Ministry of Education planned to create jobs for 80% or more graduate students who complete their studies annually over the past three years, thereby improving the employability rate. According to the 2018 unemployment and employment survey conducted by the Central Statistical Agency, the rate of unemployment for the youth was 25.3%. Female and male youth were 30.9% and 19% respectively. Female graduates are highly unemployed compared to their male counterparts. The rate of unemployment in rural areas is significant between the ages of 20–24 in urban and rural areas as well as the whole country. This is followed by those in the age groups of 15–19 and 25–29.

In 2021 report conducted in Debre Birhan University, 190 academic staff turned out from the university from 2018 to 2021. The turnover has had a negative effect on the organization venture; many highly skilled employees left the organization that caused organizational malfunction, poor service delivery, lack of systematic administration, or administrative task delays.

Further research showed that graduate employment in engineering was in good condition from 2009 and 2013, with the rate of 80.3. In 2013, there were 9,185 new engineering graduates but their training did not meet employing requirement. In 2012 alone, 50,000 new graduate students released to job market was too large in private and state institutions. According to Proclamation 650/2009, higher education is expected to prepare knowledgeable, skilled and attitudinally mature graduates with relevant fields and disciplines to engage themselves internationally competitive.

== Solution finding ==
Many universities have tried to solve the unemployment problem through various workshops and events, i.e. by providing curriculum vitae writing, interview workshops, networking workshops and sometimes creating events by contacting student employees. Other solutions included special efforts to provide skills training for the unemployed and public works employment interventions.

The five-year development plan 2010/2011–2014/2015, the Growth and Transformation Plan (GTP), did not address the unemployment issues, despite improved the performance of various sectors in the economy. The plan also emphasized TVET programs with demands to continue on expansion of Micro and Small Enterprise.
