= Visual arts in Saudi Arabia =

The earliest forms of visual arts in Saudi Arabia emerged 60 years ago when the first-ever exhibition for school-based activities in the history of public education was held in 1953, where renowned artist Abdulhalim Radwi showcased some of his early artworks. This was followed by King Saud bin Abdulaziz’s inauguration of Saudi Arabia's first-ever art exhibition in 1958, organized by the Ministry of Knowledge (currently the Ministry of Education). These events marked the beginning of Saudi fine art in its modern form, joining other preceding long-established art forms, such as Arabic calligraphy and handicrafts, which, for centuries past, represented the only forms of visual art commonly practiced in the societies of the Arabian Peninsula.

Handicrafts, whose various forms were present in daily-use objects such as ornaments, housewares, decoration, and clothing, were regarded as one of many artistic practices prevalent in Saudi society. Traditional handicrafts, as opposed to modern arts, are more than aesthetically functional. They were deeply part and parcel of people's livelihoods through seasonal cycles and could commonly be found in local markets. Arabic calligraphy also occupied a highly symbolic position due to its association with transcribing the Quran. Its firm traditions transcended local practice, as it was passed on from generation to generation through the Ijazah system, in addition to being one of the first art forms to be included in formal education with the establishment of the Al-Falah schools in Jeddah and Makkah in 1905. Prominent calligrapher Sheikh Muhammad Taher Al-Kurdi, who left behind numerous works, is a notable graduate of this system. The Saudi Information Scientific Institute is considered the first formal educational institution in the Kingdom and home to the calligrapher Muhammad Adib. He was later entrusted with designing coinage and postage stamps during the reign of King Abdulaziz.

== The first steps of modern visual arts ==
The Ministry of Knowledge’s (currently the Ministry of Education) decision to introduce painting and fine arts as subjects in the boys’ curriculum in 1957 and the girls’ curriculum in 1959 laid the foundation for fine arts education in Saudi Arabia. Early public education is often credited with encouraging the art of drawing despite the scarcity of artistic tools. Intensive training workshops for art teachers from 1954 to 1964 were held in the summer and were led by a group of Arab artists alongside Saudi artists such as Abdul Halim Radawi. Radawi taught across many of these training courses after his graduation from the Accademia di Belle Arti di Roma, having studied there on a scholarship in the 1960s by the Ministry of Knowledge. Some other pioneering names in the Saudi art scene who benefited from the Ministry of Knowledge's scholarship programs abroad include the likes of Muhammad Al-Saleem, Muhammad Al-Saqa’bi, Dia Aziz, Ahmad Felemban, and many others. They represented the avant-garde of modern art in Saudi Arabia through solo and group art shows.

These early forays included Abdul Aziz Al-Hammad's first exhibition at Dammam's Fifth School in 1966 and artist Muhammad Al-Saleem's exhibition at Riyadh's Al Nassr Club in 1967. The trailblazing generation also had a strong female presence, with Safeya Binzagr and Mounirah Mosly holding their first joint exhibition on the premises of the Dar Al-Tarbiyyah Al-Hadeethah School in Jeddah in 1968. That era was accompanied by the emergence of art journalism across the supplements of cultural newspapers or dedicated pages on fine arts written by artists like Abduljabbar Al Yahya, Abdulrahman Al-Suleiman, and Muhammad Al-Monif.

Artists also kickstarted social initiatives that transcended personal exhibitions. They included the Jeddah Center for Fine Arts, founded by Abdul Halim Radawi in 1968 under the umbrella of the Ministry of Knowledge, and the Dar Al-Funoon in Riyadh, which was established by Muhammad Al-Saleem in 1979.

The turning point, however, in the Saudi fine arts scene came with the inception of the Institute of Art Education in Riyadh in 1965. The institute was fully equipped with qualified teachers in arts training to fill the gap of specialized academies in fine arts. Its faculty included prominent Arab artists such as Shakir Hassan Al Said and Saadi Al-Ka’bi of Iraq. The Ministry of Culture organized an exhibition of Al-Ka’bi's work titled "After a While" in Riyadh in 2020. The institute graduated its first class during the academic year 1967–68, which included a host of Saudi fine art pioneers, such as Ali AlRuzaiza, Muhammad Resayes, Mansur Kurdi, Muhammad Al-Monif, Abdulhamid Al Bakshi, and Abdullah Hammas, among others. The institute helped shape the fundamental artistic background for the Kingdom's artists besides showcasing their works in an annual exhibition held at the end of each academic year. After producing the second generation and a part of the third generation of Saudi fine artists, the institute closed its doors indefinitely in 1990.

In addition to the central role of the institute, the Youth Welfare Department also contributed to the Saudi art scene by holding its first exhibitions in 1969. It later split from the Ministry of Labor and Social Affairs into an independent entity called The General Presidency for Youth Welfare (GPYW), becoming a key hub for artists’ activities by offering the necessary support, organizing exhibitions, and distributing awards. All this was achieved through the GPYW's General Administration of Cultural Activities as well as through its supervision and support for the Saudi Arabian Society of Culture and Arts (SASCA), which was founded in 1973.

Both these entities became the focal organizations dedicated to the fine arts, providing artists with financial and moral support through awards and providing platforms to showcase their work. The support provided by the GPYW manifested across the various exhibitions it organized, the foremost of which was the General Holdings Exhibition, which was held for the first time in 1976, acquiring the greatest number of artworks possible to encourage the Kingdom's artists. This was followed by the Saudi Exhibition of Contemporary Art, first held in 1979, which presented awards and cash prizes to winners in the categories of painting, drawing, and applied arts—making it a premier art event in the Kingdom during the year.
