= Motuma Mekassa =

Ethiopian politician

- ሞቱማ መቃሳ

Minister of Defense
- In office 19 April 2018 – 16 October 2018
- Preceded by: Siraj Fegessa
- Succeeded by: Aisha Mohammed Mussa

Minister of Mines, Petroleum and Natural Gas
- In office October 2016 – April 2018
- Preceded by: Tolosa Shagi
- Succeeded by: Melese Alemu

Minister of Water, Irrigation and Electricity
- In office October 2015 – October 2016
- Succeeded by: Sileshi Bekele

Personal details
- Born: 30 July 1965 (age 61)
- Party: Ethiopian People's Revolutionary Democratic Front
- Other political affiliations: Oromo Peoples' Democratic Organization
- Education: Addis Ababa University (BSc); Punjabi University Patiala (MSc)

Motuma Mekassa (Amharic: ሞቱማ መቃሳ, motuma mek’asa; born 30 July 1965) is an Ethiopian politician. He was elected to parliament in 2010 and has served as Minister of Water, Irrigation and Electric, and as Minister for mines, Petroleum and Natural Gas. He was also Ethiopian Minister of Defense briefly in 2018.
