= Berhanu Adelo =

Ethiopian politician, lawyer and legal consultant

- ብርሃኑ አደሎ

Chief of the Ethiopian Human Rights Commission
- Incumbent
- Assumed office 30 January 2025
- Prime Minister: Abiy Ahmed
- Preceded by: Daniel Bekele

Personal details
- Born: Bonga, Ethiopia
- Occupation: Politician; lawyer; legal consultant
- Other offices: Until 2015 – Director General of the Ethiopian Intellectual Property Office

Berhanu Adelo (Amharic: ብርሃኑ አደሎ) is an Ethiopian politician and lawyer who has been the Chief of the Ethiopian Human Rights Commission (EHRC) since January 2025. He was a minister in the cabinet of Meles Zenawi and was an elected member of House of Peoples' Representatives in the 2005 election.

== Childhood and studies ==
Berhanu Adelo was born in Bonga, southwest Ethiopia. He obtained a law degree at Ethiopian Civil Service University and a master's degree in human rights in India.

== Lawyer and politician ==
Berhanu is a lawyer and worked as a legal consultant for a decade. He was Minister for Cabinet Affairs in the cabinet of Meles Zenawi and was adviser to Zenawi for six years. He was elected member of House of Peoples' Representatives in the 2005 Ethiopian general election. Berhanu was the Director General of the Ethiopian Intellectual Property Office through to January 2015.

On 30 January 2025, Berhanu was appointed by the Ethiopian federal parliament as the new Chief of Ethiopian Human Rights Commission (EHRC), replacing Daniel Bekele.
