= Council of Ministers of Meles Zenawi =

Ethiopian cabinet (2005–2012)

Meles cabinet
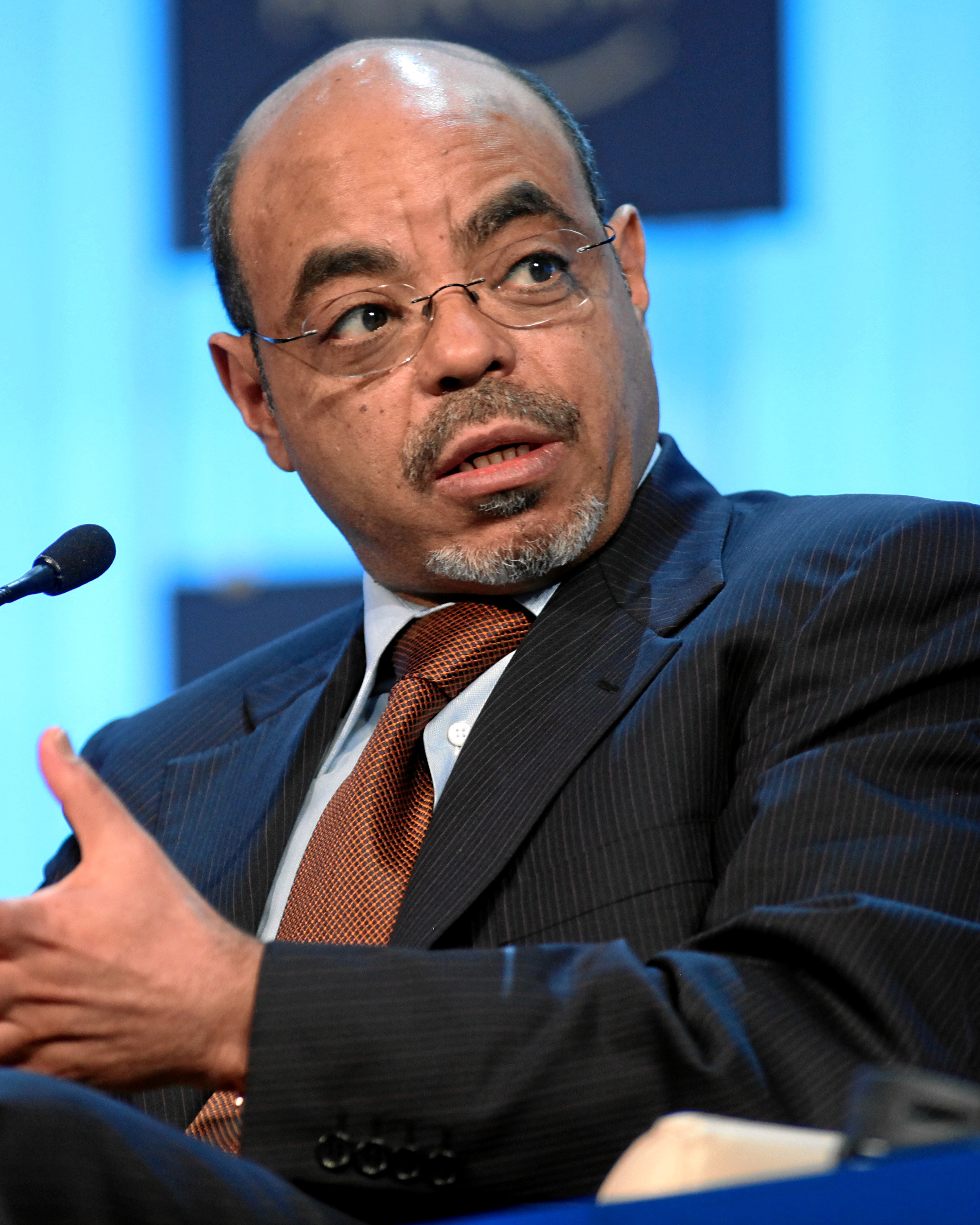
- Date formed: 11 October 2005
- Date dissolved: 20 August 2012

People and organisations
- See Members
- Total no. of members: 24
- Member party: Ethiopian People's Revolutionary Democratic Front; Tigray People's Liberation Front; Southern Ethiopian People's Democratic Movement; Oromo Democratic Party; Amhara Democratic Party; Afar National Democratic Party; Somali Democratic Party
- Opposition party: Coalition for Unity and Democracy
- Opposition leader: Birtukan Mideksa; Hailu Shawel; Merera Gudina; Lidetu Ayalew

History
- Outgoing formation: 5 October 2010
- Elections: 1995; 2000; 2005; 2010
- Predecessor: post established
- Successor: Hailemariam Desalegn

The Council of Ministers of Meles Zenawi or Meles cabinet, refers to successive cabinets of Prime Minister Meles Zenawi, who ruled Ethiopia from 1991 until his death in 2012.

== October 2005 cabinet ==
Meles' first cabinet was formed on 11 October 2005 with the aim of tackling government weakness and to end poverty in Ethiopia. Critics stated that the new cabinet did not provide accountability to the parliament because it did not reflect the ethnic diversity of Meles' supporters. Some leading political figures who supported Meles lost their cabinet positions, with 11 ministers being replaced.

The House of Peoples' Representatives (HPR) approved the cabinet with "347 votes", 66 objections and four abstentions in parliament.

== October 2010 cabinet ==
This list reflects recent cabinet members of Meles Zenawi as of 5 October 2010.

Cabinet members
| No | Post | Name | Party | Notes |
|---|---|---|---|---|
| 1 | Deputy Prime Minister | Hailemariam Desalegn | SEPDM/EPRDF | |
| 2 | Minister of Agriculture | Tefera Deribew | ANDM/EPRDF | |
| 3 | Minister of Civil Service | Junedin Sado | OPDO/EPRDF | |
| 4 | Ministry of Communication and Information Technology | Debretsion Gebremichael | TPLF/EPRDF | |
| 5 | Ministry of Culture and Tourism | Amin Abdulkadir | ANDP | |
| 6 | Ministry of Defense | Siraj Fegeta | SEPDM/EPRDF | |
| 7 | Ministry of Education | Demeke Mekonnen | ANDM/EPRDF | |
| 8 | Ministry of Federal Affairs | Shiferaw Tekelemariam | SEPDM/EPRDF | |
| 9 | Ministry of Finance and Economic Development | Sufian Ahmed | OPDO/EPRDF | |
| 10 | Ministry of Health | Tewodros Adhanom | TPLF/EPRDF | |
| 11 | Ministry of Industry | Mekonnen Manyazewal | Non-partsian member | |
| 12 | Ministry of Justice | Berhane Hailu | ANDM/EPRDF | |
| 13 | Ministry of Labor and Social Affairs | Abdulfetah Abdulahi Hassen | SPDP | New |
| 14 | Ministry of Mines | Sinknesh Ejigu | OPDO/EPRDF | New |
| 15 | Ministry of Science and Technology | Desse Dalke | SEPDM/EPRDF | New |
| 16 | Ministry of Trade and Investment | Abdurahman Shek Mohammed | SPDP | New |
| 17 | Ministry of Transport | Diriba Kuma | OPDO/EPRDF | |
| 18 | Ministry of Urban Development and Construction | Mekuria Haile | SEPDM/EPRDF | New |
| 19 | Ministry of Water and Energy | Alemayehu Tegenu | OPDO/EPRDF | |
| 20 | Ministry of Women, Youth and Children’s Affairs | Zenebu Tadesse | ANDM/EPRDF | New |
| 21 | Ministry of Foreign Affairs | Hailemariam Desalegn | SEPDM/EPRDF | |
| 22 | Director General of the Ethiopian Revenues and Customs Authority | Melaku Fanta | ANDM/EPRDF | |
| 23 | Government Chief Whip | Aster Mamo | OPDO/EPRDF | |
| 24 | Government Communication Office Head | Bereket Simon | ANDM/EPRDF | |

- The last 3 appointees are members of the Cabinet with a ministerial portfolio.

House of Peoples' Representatives
| No | Post | Name | Party | Note |
|---|---|---|---|---|
| 1 | Speaker | Abadula Gemeda | OPDO/EPRDF | New |
| 2 | Deputy Speaker | Shitaye Minale | ANDM/EPRDF | |

House of Federation
| No | Post | Name | Party | Note |
|---|---|---|---|---|
| 1 | Speaker | Kassa Tekleberhan | ANDM/EPRDF | New |

== Other Meles ministers ==
Berhanu Adelo was Minister for Cabinet Affairs during part of the Meles prime ministership.

== See also ==
- Council of Ministers (Ethiopia)
