= Medemer Artificial Intelligence University =

Proposed public university in Addis Ababa, Ethiopia

- መደመር የአርቲፊሻል ኢንተለጀንስ ዩኒቨርሲቲ
- Type: Public
- Established: 2026
- Founder: Council of Ministers of Ethiopia
- Affiliations: Government of Ethiopia
- Location: Addis Ababa, Ethiopia

Medemer Artificial Intelligence University (MAIU; Amharic: መደመር የአርቲፊሻል ኢንተለጀንስ ዩኒቨርሲቲ) is a proposed public autonomous university in Addis Ababa, Ethiopia, dedicated to artificial intelligence (AI) and advanced computational sciences. The university was formally approved by the Council of Ministers on 2 March 2026 under Proclamation No. 1294/2015.

The institution derives its name from the “Medemer” philosophy, a concept emphasizing synergy and collective development introduced by Prime Minister Abiy Ahmed.

== History ==
The proposal to establish a dedicated artificial intelligence university emerged within Ethiopia's broader digital transformation and economic reform agenda.

Public announcements regarding the creation of an AI-specialized university were made by Prime Minister Abiy Ahmed in 2025 and 2026, including statements before the House of People's Representatives.

In February 2026, the Prime Minister stated that the university would become operational in the next Ethiopian year and indicated that construction was underway.

During the 39th African Union Summit in February 2026, the university was presented by the Prime Minister as part of Ethiopia's broader strategy to expand digital infrastructure, research capacity, and technological capability.

On 2 March 2026, during its 53rd regular session, the Council of Ministers approved the draft regulation formally establishing Medemer Artificial Intelligence University as an autonomous public university. The regulation was approved to enter into force upon publication in the Federal Negarit Gazette.

== Legal status ==
Medemer Artificial Intelligence University is established pursuant to Proclamation No. 1294/2015, which provides the legal basis for forming autonomous public higher education institutions in Ethiopia.

The regulation defines institutional autonomy, governance structure, academic mandate, and national development responsibilities. The university becomes operational upon publication of its regulation in the Federal Negarit Gazette.

== Academic focus ==
The university is designed as a specialized institution dedicated to artificial intelligence and related disciplines. Anticipated academic areas include artificial intelligence, machine learning, data science, robotics, advanced computing, and intelligent systems.

Officials have stated that the institution aims to train specialized professionals to support Ethiopia's technological capacity-building and economic modernization.

Media reports have suggested that the university may enroll approximately 1,000 students annually once fully operational.

== Strategic context ==
According to official statements, the university forms part of Ethiopia's Digital Ethiopia 2030 strategy, which integrates digital identification systems with payment platforms and data exchange frameworks to modernize public services and expand financial inclusion.

Government communications have described artificial intelligence as a priority area within Ethiopia's broader economic reform program, particularly in relation to youth skills development and digital capacity-building.

== International context ==
Globally, relatively few universities are dedicated exclusively to artificial intelligence. A frequently cited example is the Mohamed bin Zayed University of Artificial Intelligence in the United Arab Emirates, established in 2020.

Media coverage has compared Ethiopia's initiative to other specialized AI institutions and discussed its potential implications for higher education and digital development in Africa.

== Reception ==
The establishment of the university received coverage from international and regional media outlets, including Reuters, Anadolu Agency, University World News, Addis Standard, Tech Review Africa, TV BRICS, and the Ethiopian Broadcasting Corporation.

Some reporting has noted that implementation challenges may include faculty recruitment, infrastructure development, and sustainable funding mechanisms within the context of Ethiopia's broader macroeconomic reforms.

== See also ==
- Higher education in Ethiopia
- Digital transformation
