= Mohamouda Ahmed Gaas =

Ethiopian politician

Mohamouda Ahmed Gaas is an Ethiopian politician and a member of the Ethiopian ruling party. He was a State (Vice) Minister of the Ethiopian Ministry of Culture and Tourism up until October 2010, when he was later moved to Ministry of Science and Technology as a deputy Minister. Mohamouda Ahmed Gaas founded the Afar Revolutionary Democratic Unity Union (ARDUU) in 1991. ARDUU later became a part of the Afar Revolutionary Democratic Unity Front (ARDUF).

Gaas is a Muslim and hails from the AFAR region of Ethiopia. He is married with 4 children and speaks 4 different languages.

== Millennium pageant controversy ==
The Ministry of Culture and Tourism, which is responsible for developing and promoting tourism in Ethiopia, has been embroiled in a major controversy surrounding a beauty pageant in celebration of the Ethiopian Millennium in 2007. Allegedly Mohamouda Ahmed Gaas and officials from the ministry obtained promotional services from a UK based company for the Ethiopian Millennium but after the event took place refused to pay. Following claims of failure to pay major bills, in December 2009 the company commenced formal legal action in the British courts, seeking a total payment of US$1,022,810.52, comprising US$488.500.00 principal debt and US$543,310.52 interest and late fees.
