= 2024 Tigray coup d'état =

Overthrow of Tigray's regional administration

- Part of the TPLF factional dispute
Date	7 October 2024
Location	Tigray Region, Ethiopia
Result	TPLF ousted some IRAT officials

Belligerents
Interim Regional Administration of Tigray	Tigray People's Liberation Front

Commanders and leaders
Getachew Reda	Debretsion Gebremichael

On 7 October 2024, the Tigray People's Liberation Front (TPLF) announced the removal of the Interim Regional Administration of Tigray (IRAT) President, Getachew Reda, and several other key officials from their positions in what was referred to as an internal coup within the regional leadership. The Interim Regional Administration of Tigray (IRAT) office of the president released a statement announcing that the TPLF declared a public coup. This political upheaval, led by veteran TPLF leader Debretsion Gebremichael, escalated tensions in the region, raising concerns over the stability of IRAT.

== Background ==
The IRAT was established following the Pretoria Peace Agreement between the Ethiopian government and the TPLF in November 2022. Its primary purpose was to stabilize the region, implement the terms of the agreement, and oversee the rebuilding of Tigray after years of civil war. However, internal divisions within the TPLF had grown in the previous two years, culminating in the expulsion of key officials from the party.

== Key developments ==
On 7 October 2024, the TPLF released a statement announcing that Getachew Reda was removed from his position as President of IRAT. Several other senior cabinet members, including Beyene Mekru, Professor Kindeya Gebrehiwot, Hagos Godefay and Almaz Gebretsadq were also ousted. In addition, zonal leaders from six zones within the Tigray region were also dismissed.

Abraham Tekeste, the former Finance Minister, was among the seven new leaders appointed to replace the ousted officials. The TPLF emphasized that these changes were made because the interim administration, including Getachew Reda, had overstepped its mandate. The party accused the administration of attempting to consolidate power and function as a permanent government, contrary to the terms outlined in the Pretoria Agreement.

== Tensions within the TPLF ==
The political struggle within the TPLF stemmed from growing divisions between Debretsion Gebremichael, the long-serving leader of the party, and Getachew Reda, who was seen as a prominent figure in the interim administration. This divide deepened following the 14th TPLF Congress, where Getachew was reportedly expelled from the party.

The TPLF's leadership accused Getachew's administration of failing to focus on the core responsibilities outlined in the peace agreement, which prioritized the provision of essential services and reconstruction efforts in the war-torn region. The party warned that the interim government was positioning itself as a permanent governing body, undermining the transitional nature of the administration.

== Impact and reactions ==
The TPLF's removal of Getachew Reda and other key figures created a highly volatile political environment in Tigray. As a result, the regional administration faces significant internal challenges, with uncertainties surrounding the leadership transition and the potential for further political unrest. The TPLF has stated that it will notify the Ethiopian federal government and other relevant parties about the changes in leadership and stressed that the new appointments are aimed at ensuring that the goals of the Pretoria Agreement are met.
