= Ministry of Youth and Sport =

Ministry of Youth and Sport may refer to:

- Ministry of Youth and Sport (Ethiopia)
- Ministry of Youth and Sport (Romania)
