= Abraham Tekeste =

Ethiopian politician and economist

- አብረሃም ተከስተ

State Minister of Ministry of Finance and Economic Development
- In office 20 October 2010 – 1 November 2016
- President: Girma Wolde-Giorgis; Mulatu Teshome
- Prime Minister: Meles Zenawi; Hailemariam Desalegn

Minister of Finance and Economic Development
- In office 1 November 2016 – 11 October 2018
- President: Mulatu Teshome
- Prime Minister: Hailemariam Desalegn; Abiy Ahmed
- Preceded by: Sufian Ahmed
- Succeeded by: Ahmed Shide

Personal details
- Occupation: Politician; economist

Abraham Tekeste (Amharic: አብረሃም ተከስተ) is an Ethiopian politician and economist who was State Minister of Ministry of Finance and Economic Development from 2010 to 2016 and Minister of Finance and Economic Cooperation from 2016 to 2018. He became the Head of Urban Development and Industry Bureau with the rank of Deputy Chief Administrator from 2018.

== Political positions ==
Abraham Tekeste was appointed as State Minister of Ministry of Finance and Economic Development on 20 October 2010 under Meles Zenawi cabinet. On 1 November 2016, Abraham Desalegn was appointed as Minister of Finance and Economic Cooperation upon Prime Minister Hailemariam Desalegn reshuffle of technocrat politicians. During his tenure, he played a great role in the development of the first and second Growth and Transformation Plans. On 11 October 2018, five days before Prime Minister Abiy Ahmed reshuffled his cabinet, he was elected as Head of Urban Development and Industry Bureau with the rank of Deputy Chief Administrator.
