= Intellectual property in Ethiopia =

Intellectual property of Ethiopia is managed by the Ethiopian Intellectual Property Office (EIFO), who oversees Intellectual Property Right (IPR) issues. Ethiopia has not signed IPR treaty such as the Paris Convention for the Protection of Industrial Property, the World Intellectual Property Organization (WIPO) copyright treaty, the Berne Convention for Literary and Artistic Works, the Madrid System for the International Registration of Marks, and the Patent Cooperation Treaty.

The government has intention to accede to the Paris Convention, Marrakesh Protocol and Madrid Protocol. EIPO is responsible for maintaining Ethiopian patent rights and copyrighted materials, and combat pirated software. In general, EIPO is experiencing weakness in staffs and budget, and does not have law enforcement authority. There is also abuse of U.S. trademarks, particularly in the hospitality and retail sectors. The government does not control counterfeit goods seizures, and no estimates are available in Ethiopia. Ethiopia is not listed in USTR's Special 301 report and has poor market conduct.

== Copyright law ==
The intellectual property is governed by various proclamations, regulations and directives. On 19 July 2004, the Copyright and Neighboring Rights Protection came to force, which then amended by Proclamation No. 872/2014, issued by the Council of Ministers under Regulation No. 305/2014.

Like most countries, copyright is protected as long as author's death plus 50 years after his/her death. For the rights of artists and music producers of sound recording extending to 50 years and the rights of broadcasting organizations extend to 20 years.

== Patent law ==
The patent law is governed under Proclamation No. 123/95 together with the Council of Ministers regulation No 12/97. The patent laws regulate inventions, minor inventions, utility models and industrial design. The patent rights shall belong to the inventor; if invention attributed to two persons jointly not shall belong to them.

Alebel Ashagrie & Associates, and Ethiopian Law Office provides comprehensive types of intellectual property, covering patent and trademark protection, design registration, copyright and the licensing of technology.

The duration of patent protection is quite different in Ethiopia, but usually given from initial period of patent protection filed by applicants up to fifteen years. However, a further five years would be added if the protection is properly worked in Ethiopia.

=== Patent of invention ===
The patent is given to a patent applicant if they registered for the first time or the 12 months have not lapsed since it has been registered in other countries. If inventor granted patent of introduction, the invention will be valid for a period of 15 years. Further five years patent may be valid if invention is properly worked in Ethiopia. Ethiopia's first intellectual property law was enacted in 2006, which included provisions for patents, trademarks, copyrights, and industrial designs. The law aimed to protect the rights of creators and inventors in Ethiopia and promote innovation and creativity in the country. Since then, Ethiopia has made efforts to strengthen its intellectual property rights framework to encourage innovation and economic growth.

=== Patent of introduction ===
This type of patent may be issued which the inventions are patented outside Ethiopia and does not expired following the declaration of a party that takes responsibility for. The requirement of patent of introduction is the same as those proscribed for patient of introduction. In patent of introduction, applicant should subscribe the application number, date and origin of the foreign patent or the requisite source of information if the person does not know.

The patent of introduction registered in Ethiopia must valid for up to ten years and depends on owner obligation to pay for the invention each year, starting with the third year after it has been granted and pays the relevant annual fee.

== Trademark law ==
The trademark registration and proclamation No. 501/2006 together with the trademark registration and protection regulation No. 273/2012 are the major laws that are enforced to regular trademark matters. The trade mark registration should be filed for the Ethiopian Intellectual Property office by a local agent.

Given importance that the legalized Power of Attorney must certify and notarize by the Ethiopian Consular. Foreign applicants do need a domestic registration.

=== Procedure ===
The application process includes a formal examination, an examination that involves discreteness and inquiry of prior trademarks. The inquiry of prior trademarks is necessary as it required by the Ethiopian authority, before filing trading application. If the mark necessarily meets criteria for examination and extra requirements, it will be published in the Intellectual Property Gazette, or depending on the authority request, it will be published under official newspaper for 30 days. However, there might be opposition party that contradicts the trademark publication, and in most cases, it takes approximately 6–8 months from first filling to registration.

=== Duration ===
The trademark registration is valid in Ethiopia for 7 years from the filling date. The registration is renewable for 7 years.
