= Nassise Chali =

Ethiopian politician, diplomat and lecturer

- ናሲሴ ጫሊ

Minister of Tourism
- In office 6 October 2021 – 8 October 2024
- Prime Minister: Abiy Ahmed
- Preceded by: Hirut Kassaw
- Succeeded by: Selamawit Kassa

Ambassadors of Ethiopia to Canada
- In office 29 December 2018 – 6 October 2021

Personal details
- Education: Addis Ababa University (BA, MA) University of Washington, Seattle, WA (Informatics, Cybersecurity) Bellevue College, Bellevue, WA
- Occupation: Minister; Diplomat; lecturer; Cybersecurity Engineer

Nassise Chali (Amharic: ናሲሴ ጫሊ) is an Ethiopian public servant, diplomat and lecturer who has served as the Minister of Tourism from 6 October 2021 until 8 October 2024. She was Ambassador of Ethiopia to Canada from 2018 to 2021. Prior to her position as a diplomat, she was a Cyber security engineer at the Boeing company.

== Previous positions ==
Nassise has a Bachelor of Arts degree in Foreign Language and Literature and a Master of Arts degree in Teaching English as a Foreign Language both from Addis Ababa University. In addition, Nassise was lecturer at various universities, like Jimma University, St. Mary's University and Adama Science and Technology University. She led Director of Protocol and Public Relations in the Oromia Region Presidential Office. She became Ambassador of Ethiopia to Canada in December 2018. On 6 October 2021 reshuffle of Abiy Ahmed cabinet, she was appointed as Minister of Tourism.
