= National Archives and Library of Ethiopia =

National library and archive of Ethiopia

Coordinates: 9°1′5″N 38°45′0″E

- የኢትዮጵያ ብሄራዊ ቤተ- መዛግብት እና ቤተ- መጽሃፍት
- Location: Addis Ababa, Ethiopia
- Type: National library
- Established: 1944
- Reference to legal mandate: Proclamation No. 179/1999

Collection
- Items collected: books, periodical literature, microform, photographs, manuscript, research paper
- Legal deposit: yes

Access and use
- Population served: researchers, government and nongovernment organizations, employees, students (Note: According to the United Nations, as of 2007 approximately 38 percent of adult Ethiopians are literate.)

Other information
- Director: Yikunnoamlak Mezgebu
- Website: http://www.nala.gov.et

The National Archives and Library of Ethiopia, located in Addis Ababa, is the national library and archives of the country. The library was inaugurated in 1944 by Emperor Haile Selassie and began service with books donated by the emperor.

== Overview ==
In 1976, proclamation No. 50/76 gave the library the legal right to collect three copies of every material published in the country. In 1999, the library was reestablished by proclamation no. 179.1999 as a national institution, which resulted in structural changes and the mission to be one of the top five national libraries and archives in Africa by 2020. It is currently a unit of the Ministry of Culture and Tourism.

The archives was established in 1979, and its collection includes ancient and historical manuscripts written from as early as the 14th and 15th centuries. It started functioning with archives from the Ministry of the Grand Palace, Palace of the Crown Prince, and others. The archive includes letters written by several kings, empresses, and princes.

== See also ==
- Ethiopian historiography
- Unesco Memory of the World Register – Africa
- List of national archives

== Bibliography ==
- "Ethiopia", World Report 2010, The Hague: International Federation of Library Associations, OCLC 225182140, archived from the original on 2019-06-29, "Freedom of access to information" (Includes information about the national library)
