= Hirut Woldemariam =

Ethiopian politician (born 1975)

- ሕሩት ወልደማሪያም

Social Affairs Advisor to the Prime Minister of Ethiopia
- Incumbent
- Assumed office 18 August 2020
- President: Sahle-Work Zewde
- Prime Minister: Abiy Ahmed

Minister of Science and Higher Education
- In office October 2018 – August 2020
- President: Sahle-Work Zewde
- Prime Minister: Abiy Ahmed
- Succeeded by: Samuel Urkato

Minister of Labor and Social Affairs
- In office April 2018 – October 2018
- President: Sahle-Work Zewde
- Prime Minister: Abiy Ahmed

Minister of Culture and Tourism
- In office 2008 – 2016
- President: Girma Wolde-Giorgis; Mulatu Teshome
- Prime Minister: Meles Zenawi; Hailemariam Dessalegn

Personal details
- Born: 24 October 1975 (age 51) Debre Markos, Gojjam, Ethiopia
- Spouse: Tegene Hawando
- Children: 3

Hirut Woldemariam (Ge'ez: ሕሩት ወልደማሪያም; born 24 October 1975) is an Ethiopian writer, teacher, politician and former minister of the Ministry of Science and Higher Education (Ethiopia), Ministry of Culture and Tourism, Ministry of Labor and Social Affairs. She was the first female Vice president of Addis Ababa University.

== Life and career ==
Hirut Woldemariam was born in Debre Markos, Gojjam, Ethiopia from her father Woldemariam Teketel, from Kambata, and her mother Brehane Mekonen, from Debre Marqos. She has received both her Bachelor of Arts and Master of Arts in Linguistics from Addis Ababa University and her Doctor of Philosophy in Linguistics from the University of Cologne, Institute of African Studies. She is a professor in the Department of Linguistics and Philology, College of Humanities, Journalism and Communication of the Addis Ababa University.

Hirut served in different position of vice presidency in Addis Ababa University namely: Vice president for Institutional Development (April 2012 – October 2014), Vice president of External Relations, Strategic Planning and Partnership (January 2010 – April 2012), and Associate Vice President for Academic Affairs (2008–2010) for about seven years. She also served as a Head, Department of Linguistics, Faculty of Humanities, Addis Ababa University (2006–2008).

Hirut has been of service to Ethiopia in many cabinet minister positions, which are Ministry of Culture and Tourism (2008–2016), Ministry of Labor and Social Affairs (April–October 2018) and Ministry of Science and Higher Education (October 2018 – August 2020). Hirut is now performing duties on a position of Social Affairs Advisor to the Prime Minister.

Hirut has more than 29 original publication and 5 unpublished manuscripts, which are more focused on Omotic languages, descriptive linguistics, historical-comparative linguistics, linguistic landscape, and sociolinguistics in Addis Ababa University.
