= Filsan Abdi =

Ethiopian activist and politician (born 1992)

Minister of Women, Children and Youth
- In office 12 March 2020 – 27 September 2021
- Prime Minister: Abiy Ahmed
- Preceded by: Yalem Tsegaye
- Succeeded by: Ergoge Tesfaye

Personal details
- Born: 1992 (age 33–34) Dire Dawa, Oromia Region, (Note: In 1992, Dire Dawa was under the jurisdiction of Oromia; in order to resolve a territorial conflict between Oromia and the Somali Region, it was later turned into a chartered city separate from both regions in 1993.) Ethiopia
- Occupation: Peace activist

Filsan Abdullahi Ahmed (Somali: Filsan Cabdullaahi Axmed; Amharic: ፊልሳን አብዱላሂ አህመድ; born 1992), also called Filsan Abdi, (Note: Somali: Filsan Cabdi; Amharic: ፊልሳን አብዲ) is an Ethiopian activist and politician from the Somali Region. She is a founder of the Nabad project, a satellite television station for promoting communication and peace in Somali Region and between the Somali and Oromo communities.

Filsan was appointed as the Minister of Women, Children and Youth on 12 March 2020, becoming the youngest person in the Abiy Ahmed cabinet and the first Somali Ethiopian to be appointed to a federal government position. She resigned from the cabinet in September 2021. In December 2021, she stated to The Washington Post that she had resigned in relation to Abiy's handling of the Tigray War.

== Childhood and education ==
Filsan Abdullahi Ahmed was born in 1991 or 1992 in Dire Dawa. Her parents are ethnic Somalis from Jigjiga, the capital of Somali Region in Ethiopia. Filsan's mother is a businesswoman and her father a petroleum engineer who worked most of his life in Saudi Arabia. Filsan studied and lived in Addis Ababa where she obtained a degree in leadership and management from Unity University, and to England where she obtained a degree in communications science at the University of Hertfordshire. She later worked as a speech and language therapist in England for several years.

== Nabad project/TV ==
Filsan created the Nabad ("peace") project as a response to the violence in Somali Region in August 2018 that surrounded the resignation of Abdi Mohamoud Omar, the president of Somali Region. Filsan saw Abdi as having been a dictator. The Nabad project, organising panel discussions in both Addis Ababa and Jigjiga, aimed to encourage communication among Somali region residents to "calm down all the flaming confusion and misconception". In her 2019 interview with Addis Standard, Filsan described the Somali people living in the Somali Region as wishing to be accepted as fully Ethiopian citizens, and in her view, unmotivated by the idea of a Greater Somalia. The Nabad project communicated extensively with the Qeerroos, including Jawar Mohammed, while remaining an independent project.

One of the themes of Nabad was that, according to Filsan, the Hego youth armed by Abdi should be seen as having been brainwashed, not as enemies. Nabad organised community meetings with Hegos. Another theme was Oromo–Somali dialogue as part of a conflict resolution process.

As part of the Nabad project, Filsan launched a satellite television stated, Nabad TV. In October 2019, she was the only woman head of a satellite television station according to BBC News. At the time, the station broadcast six hours daily in Somali.

== Ministership (2020–2021) ==
In early 2020, Filsan held the status assigned by the Ethiopian federal government of a Goodwill Ambassador.

Filsan became the Ethiopian federal Minister of Women, Children and Youth on 12 March 2020, replacing Yalem Tsegaye, who was last Tigray People's Liberation Front (TPLF) member to be purged from the Abiy Ahmed cabinet. Filsan became the youngest person in the cabinet.

=== Tigray War ===
In response to Debretsion Gebremichael's reference to wartime sexual violence in his speech on the state of the Tigray War, Filsan stated on 31 January 2021 that the federal government "had a zero-tolerance policy towards any form of sexual violence". The Ministry, together with the Attorney General Adanech Abiebie and defence personnel, created a task force to investigate interview victims, collect medical evidence and aid the victims of sexual violence in the Tigray War, arriving in Mekelle on 1 February. On 11 February, Filsan publicly stated on Twitter that the task force had "established [that] rape [had] taken place conclusively and without a doubt".

On 27 September 2021, Filsan resigned from her ministerial position, saying she was doing it for personal reasons, and did not want to do something that "compromises my ethics [and] is contrary to my convictions and values". She would later state that "an official very high up in Abiy's office" had blocked the publication of the task force's full report, and that she "had been told" to only include rapes by TPLF-associated fighters. Her 11 February 2021 tweet had been a response to the blocking of the full report's publication. Filsan stated that rapes committed in the Amhara and Afar Regions during the late 2021 TDF–OLA joint offensive would have been less likely if there had been accountability for the rapes that occurred in Tigray Region.

Filsan stated in her December 2021 interview that she saw prime minister Abiy as being "in denial" and "delusional", and that his "leadership [was] failing". She said that since before the war, "peace had never really been given a chance, and that Abiy [had] seemed to relish the idea of eliminating the TPLF".

== Post-ministership (2021–present) ==
In a 2 November 2022 article for The Guardian, Filsan reiterated her support for peace in Ethiopia, and said that the government "must genuinely pursue the path to peace and reconciliation", and called for accountability from all sides regarding sexual violence during the war. The day after, in an interview with PBS NewHour discussing the Pretoria agreement, Filsan stated that reaching an agreement to end the war was necessary, but should not prevent the people and groups involved from "seeking justice and accountability" for victims of human rights violations, especially in cases of sexual violence and indiscriminate attacks.

== Points of view ==
In February 2019, Filsan felt it was too early to decide if Mustafa Cagjar's presidency of the Somali Region was successful or not. She stated that Mustafa's cabinet was not gender-balanced. In March 2020, she stated that there had been "vast improvements in free speech" between the preceding Abdi presidency and the Mustafa presidency, and that "the population [was] not fearful" of the new administration. She said that the Mustafa administration had "a long way" to go in terms of nepotism and meritocracy and that there were no women in the executive committee of the Somali Region.
