= Legesse Tulu =

Ethiopian politician

- ለገሰ ቱሉ

Chairman of EBC Board
- Incumbent
- Assumed office 8 November 2022

Minister of the Government Communication Service
- Incumbent
- Assumed office 7 October 2021
- Appointed by: Abiy Ahmed

Legesse Tulu (Amharic: ለገሰ ቱሉ) is an Ethiopian politician who is the current Minister of the Government Communication Service since 2021. In November 2022, Legesse has been elected by the parliament as Chairman of the board of a state media EBC.

== Government positions ==
On 7 October 2021, Prime Minister Abiy Ahmed appointed him as Minister of the Government Communication Service. On 8 November 2022, Legesse is elected by the Ethiopian Parliament as chairman of EBC Board.
