= Tourism in Ethiopia =

Tourism in Ethiopia accounted for 5.5% of the country's gross domestic product (GDP) in 2006, having barely increased 2% over the previous year. The government is proving its commitment and willingness to develop tourism through a number of initiatives. Tourism is a featured component of Ethiopia's Poverty Reduction Strategy Paper (PRSP), which aims to combat poverty and encourage economic development.

Tourist arrivals of 2024 in %

== Overview ==
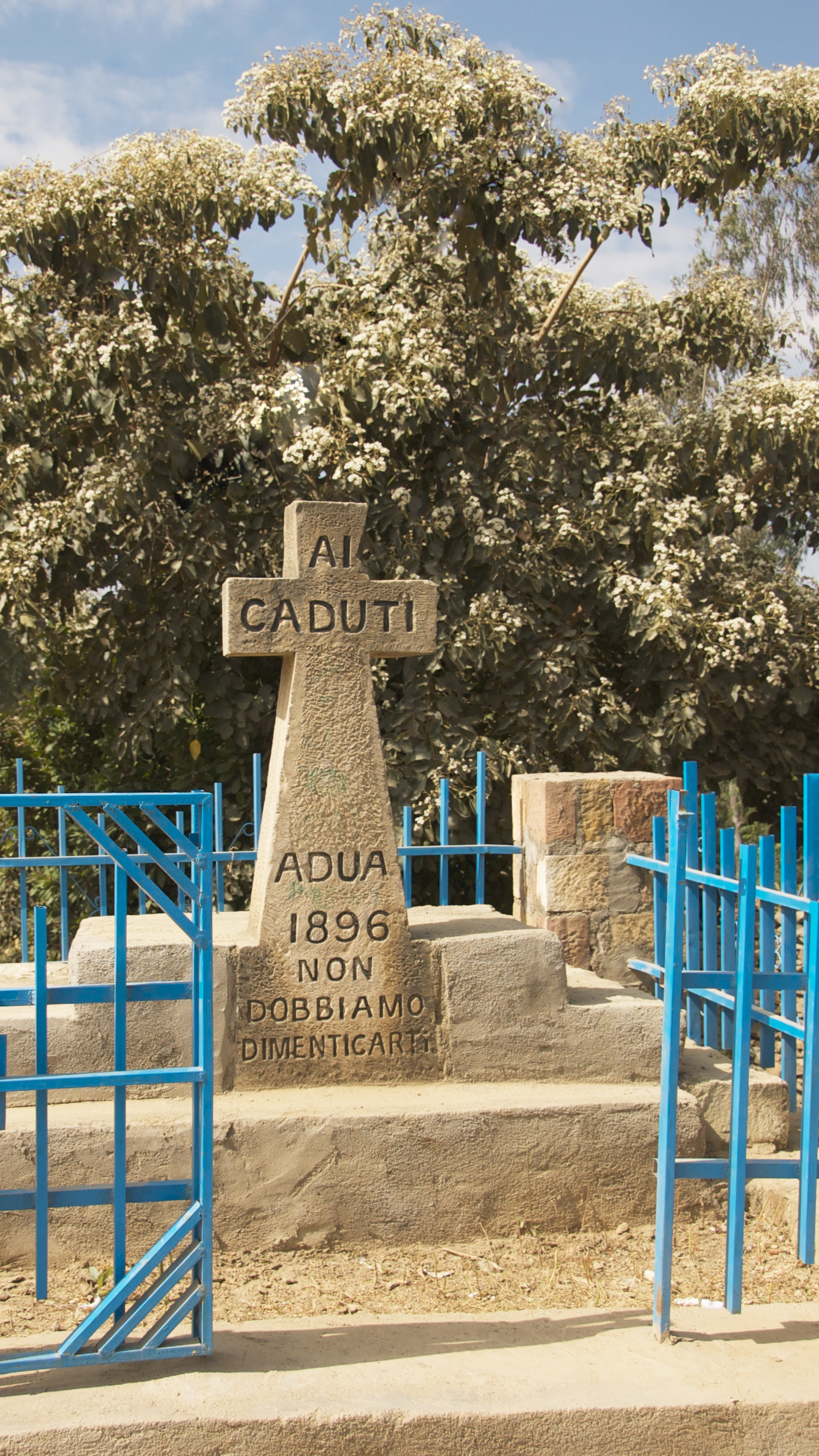
A memorial to the Italian soldiers killed in the Battle of Adwa

Tourist destinations include Ethiopia's collection of national parks (including Semien Mountains National Park), and historic sites, such as the cities of Axum, Lalibela and Gondar, Harar Jugol walled city, Negash Mosque, in Negash and Sof Omar Caves.

Developed in the 1960s, tourism declined greatly during the later 1970s and the 1980s under the Derg. Recovery began in the 1990s, but growth has been constrained by the lack of suitable hotels and other infrastructure, despite a boom in construction of small and medium-sized hotels and restaurants, and by the effects of drought and political instability.

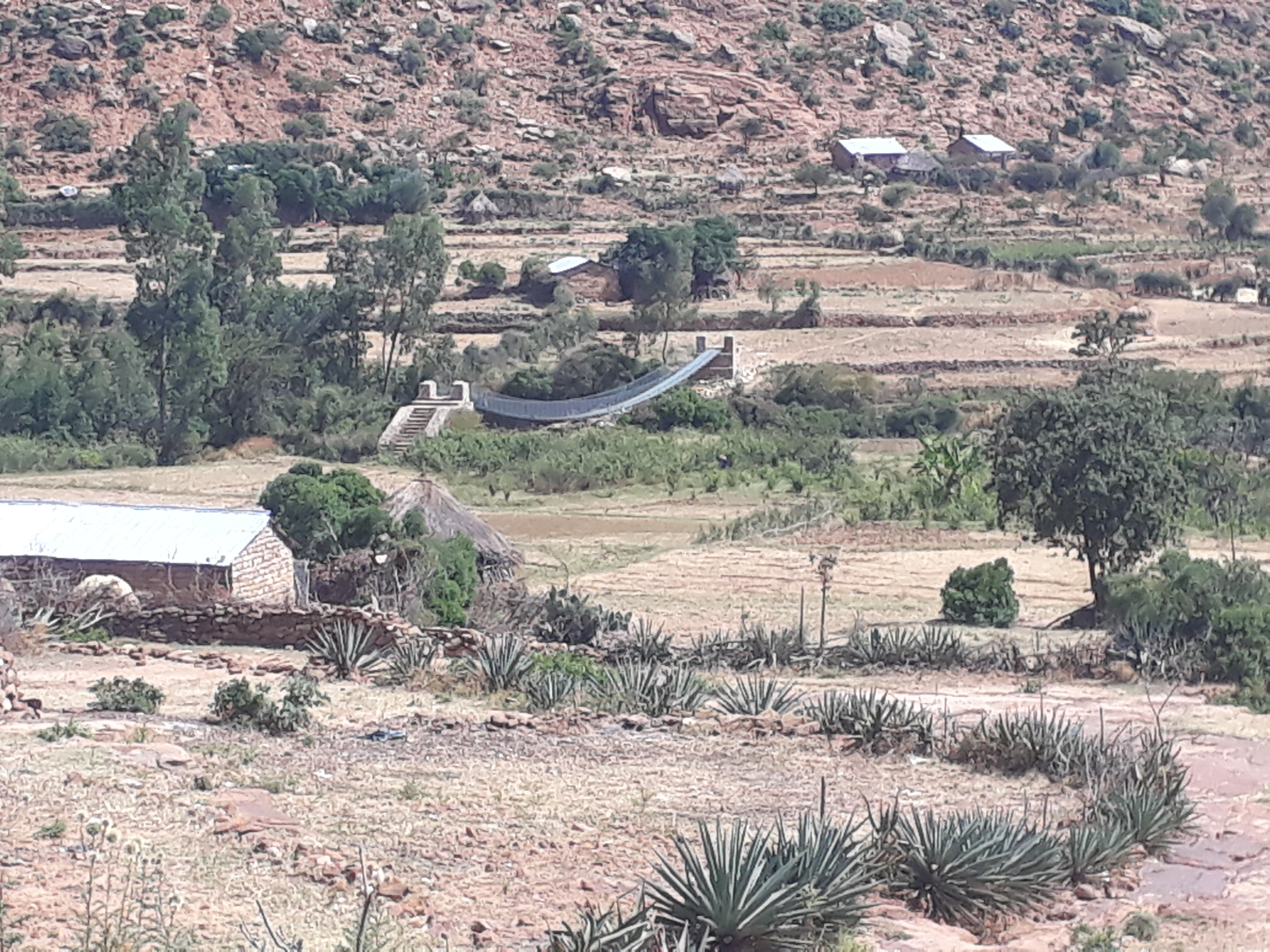
Rubaksa footbridge on trekking route 16 in Dogu'a Tembien

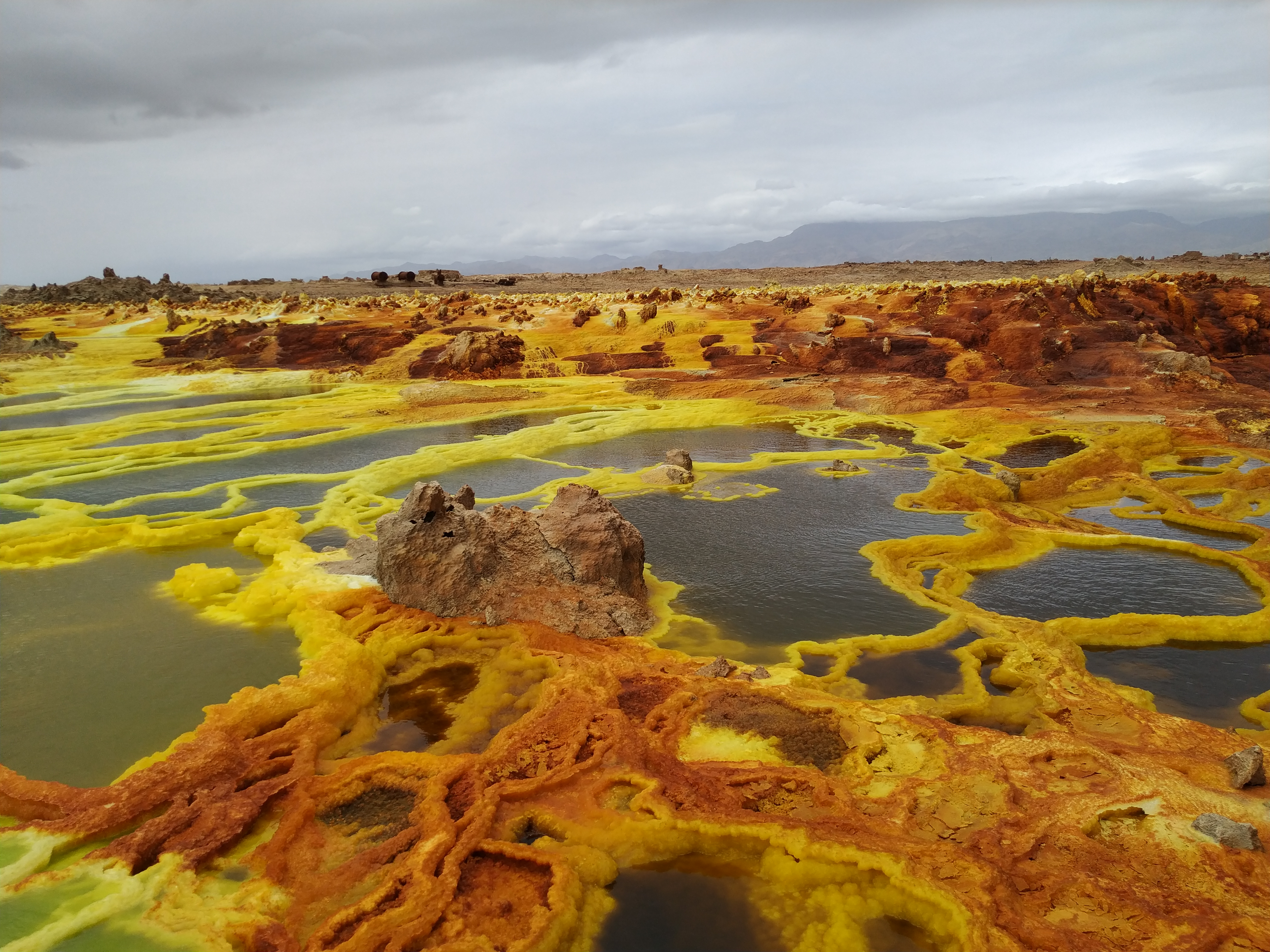
Dallol volcano

One encouraging aspect is the growing popularity of ecotourism, with significant potential for growth in Ethiopia. Travel retail sales are expected to continue to grow, posting an increase of 7% in 2006 and with a forecast 5% increase in 2007. Sales are driven primarily by expanding interest in ecotourism packages, including adventure travel, trekking and walking safaris that are making up much of the tour operators' revenues.

== World Heritage Sites ==
Ethiopia has the following nine UNESCO World Heritage Sites:

- Ruins of Aksum
- Rock-Hewn Churches at Lalibela
- Fasil Ghebbi, Gondar Region
- Harar Jugol, the Fortified Historic Town
- Konso Cultural Landscape
- Lower Valley of the Awash
- Lower Valley of the Omo
- Tiya
- Simien Mountains National Park
- Gedeo Cultural Landscape

== Millennium pageant controversy ==
September 12, 2007 marked the beginning of the year 2000 in the Ethiopian calendar. The Ministry of Culture and Tourism was embroiled in a controversy surrounding a beauty pageant in celebration of the Ethiopian Millennium. Allegedly the ministry failed to pay for promotional services from a UK based company for the Ethiopian Millennium, and is being sued for US$1 Million in the British courts.

== 2015 Tourism Award ==
Ethiopia was named the World's Best Tourism Destination for 2015 by the European Council on Tourism and Trade, citing Ethiopia's outstanding natural beauty, dramatic landscapes and ancient culture.

== See also ==
- Ministry of Culture and Tourism (Ethiopia)
- List of World Heritage Sites in Ethiopia
- Public holidays in Ethiopia
