= Fitsum Assefa =

Ethiopian politician and teacher

- ፍጹም አሰፋ
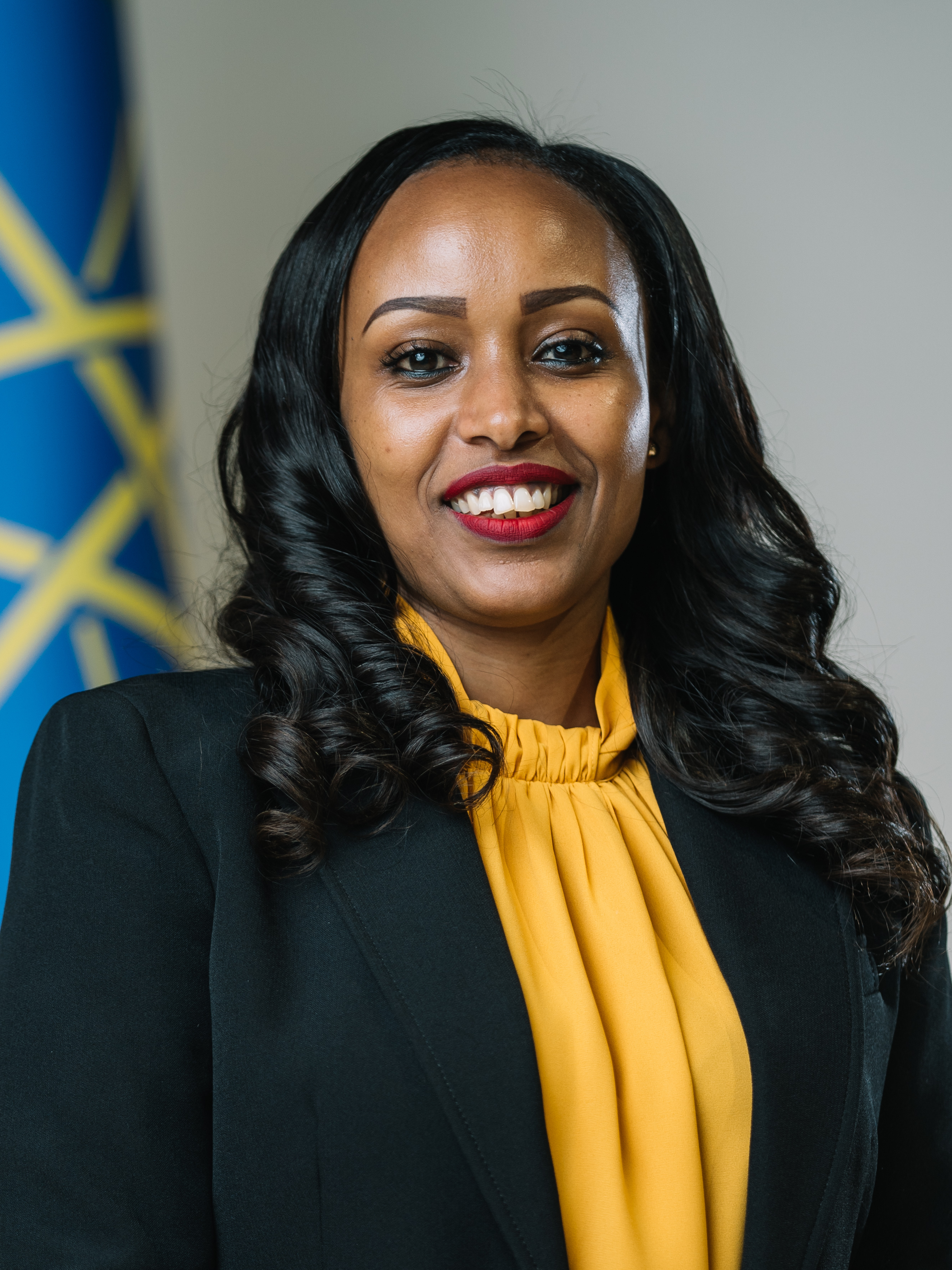

Minister of Finance
- Incumbent
- Assumed office 5 October 2026
- President: Taye Atske Selassie
- Prime Minister: Abiy Ahmed
- Preceded by: Ahmed Shide

Minister of Planning and Development
- Incumbent
- Assumed office 16 October 2018
- President: Sahle-Work Zewde; Taye Atske Selassie
- Prime Minister: Abiy Ahmed

Board of Directors Commercial Bank of Ethiopia
- Incumbent
- Assumed office 24 December 2018
- President: Sahle-Work Zewde; Taye Atske Selassie
- Prime Minister: Abiy Ahmed

Personal details
- Born: 12 May 1979 (age 47)
- Party: Prosperity Party
- Children: 3
- Education: University of Giessen; Addis Ababa University

Fitsum Assefa Adela (Ge'ez: ፍፁም አሰፋ አዴላ; born 12 May 1979) is an Ethiopian teacher and politician who is the Minister of Finance since 2026. She also leads the Minister of Planning and Development since 16 October 2018. Fitsum also has been a member of Commercial Bank of Ethiopia's Board of directors since 24 December 2018.

== Education and career ==
She earned her undergraduate degree from Addis Abeba University in Accounting and Master of Arts in Development Studies from the same university. She completed her Doctor of Philosophy in Agricultural Economics at the University of Giessen, Germany, and taught more than a decade in Hawassa University.

== Personal life ==
Fitsum has married and has 3 children.
