= Council of Ministers of Hailemariam Desalegn =

Cabinet of Ethiopian prime minister Hailemariam Desalegn (2012–2018)

Hailemariam Desalegn cabinet
- Hailemariam Desalegn
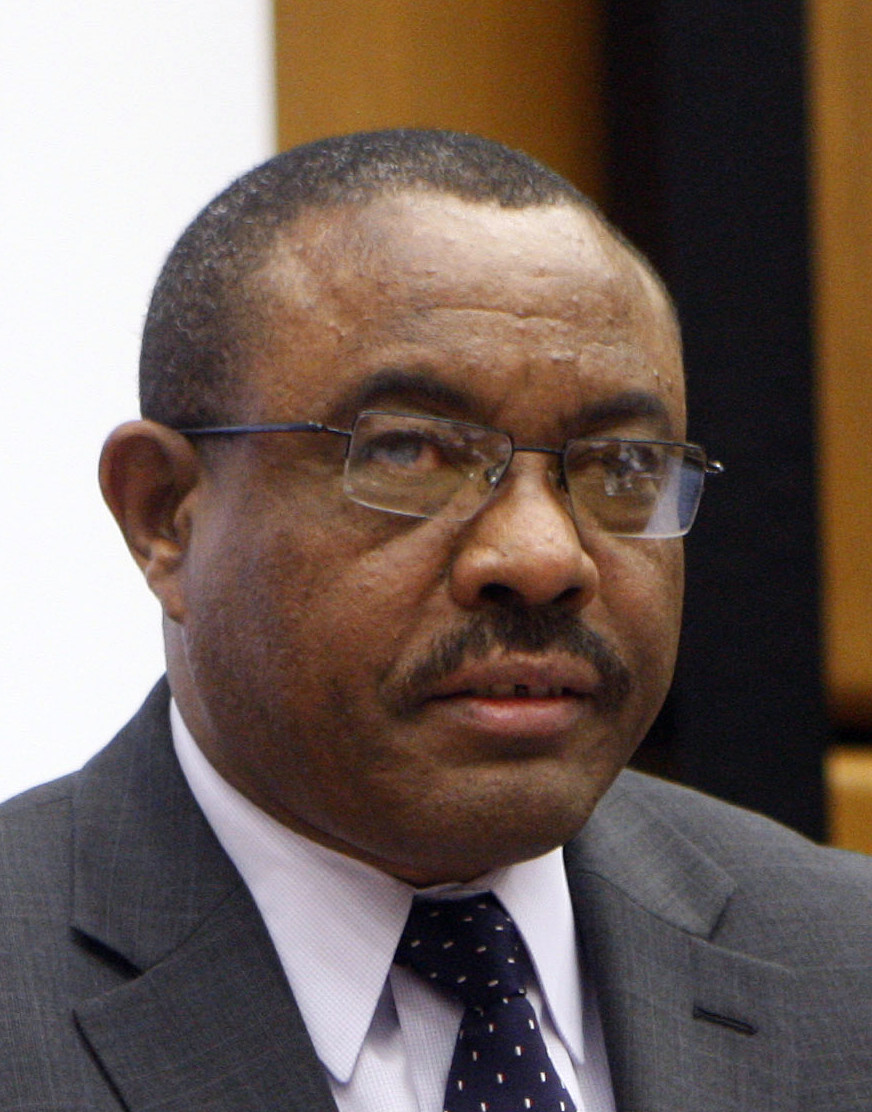
- Hailemariam in 2014
- Date formed: 29 November 2012
- Date dissolved: 15 February 2018

People and organisations
- See Members
- Total no. of members: 20 (as of November 2016)
- Member party: Southern Ethiopian People's Democratic Movement; Ethiopian People's Revolutionary Democratic Front
- Opposition party: Ogaden National Liberation Front; Oromo Liberation Front; Medrek

History
- Outgoing election: 6 October 2015
- Budget: 274.3 billion birr ($ 12.57 billion) (2016/2017)
- Predecessor: Meles Zenawi
- Successor: Abiy Ahmed

The Council of Ministers of Hailemariam Desalegn was the cabinet of the government of Ethiopia during the premiership of Hailemariam Desalegn from 2012 to 2018.

== Members ==
The Hailemariam cabinet included:

Office	Name	Dates
Prime Minister	Hailemariam Desalegn	2012–2018
Deputy Prime Minister	Demeke Mekonnen	
Minister of Foreign Affairs	Workneh Gebeyehu	
Minister of Defense	Siraj Fegessa	
Attorney General	Getachew Ambaye	
Minister of Health	Yifru Berhane	
Minister of Communication and Information Technology	Debretsion Gebremichael	
Minister of Federal Affairs and Pastoral Area Development	Kassa Tekleberhan	
Minister of Finance and Economic Cooperation	Abreham Tekeste	
Minister of Transport	Ahmed Shide	
Minister of Education	Shiferaw Tekelemariam	
Minister of Trade	Bekele Gulado	
Minister of Industry	Ahmed Abitew	
Minister of Farming and Natural Resources	Eyasu Abrha	
Minister of Livestock and Fishery	Fekadu Beyene	
Minister of Public Service and Human Resource Development	Tagese Chafo	
Minister of Urban Development and Housing	Ambachew Mekonnen	
Minister of Construction	Aisha Mohammed Mussa	
Minister of Mines, Petroleum and Natural Resources	Motuma Mekassa	
Minister of Water, Irrigation and Electricity	Sileshi Bekele	
Minister of Environmental, Forest and Climate Change	Gemedo Dale	
Minister of Science and Technology	Getahun Mekuria	
Minister of Public Enterprises	Girma Amente	
Minister of Labor and Social Affairs	Abdulfetah Abdulah	
Minister of Women's and Children's Affairs	Demitu Hambissa	
Minister of Youth and Sports	Ristu Yirdaw	
Minister of Culture and Tourism	Hirut Woldemariam	
Minister of Government Communication Affairs Office	Negeri Lencho	
Director General of Ethiopian Revenues and Customs Authority	Kebede Chane	
Chief Government Whip	Asmelash Woldesilasie	
Commissioner of National Planning Commission	Yinager Dese	
