= Shewit Shanka =

Ethiopian politician

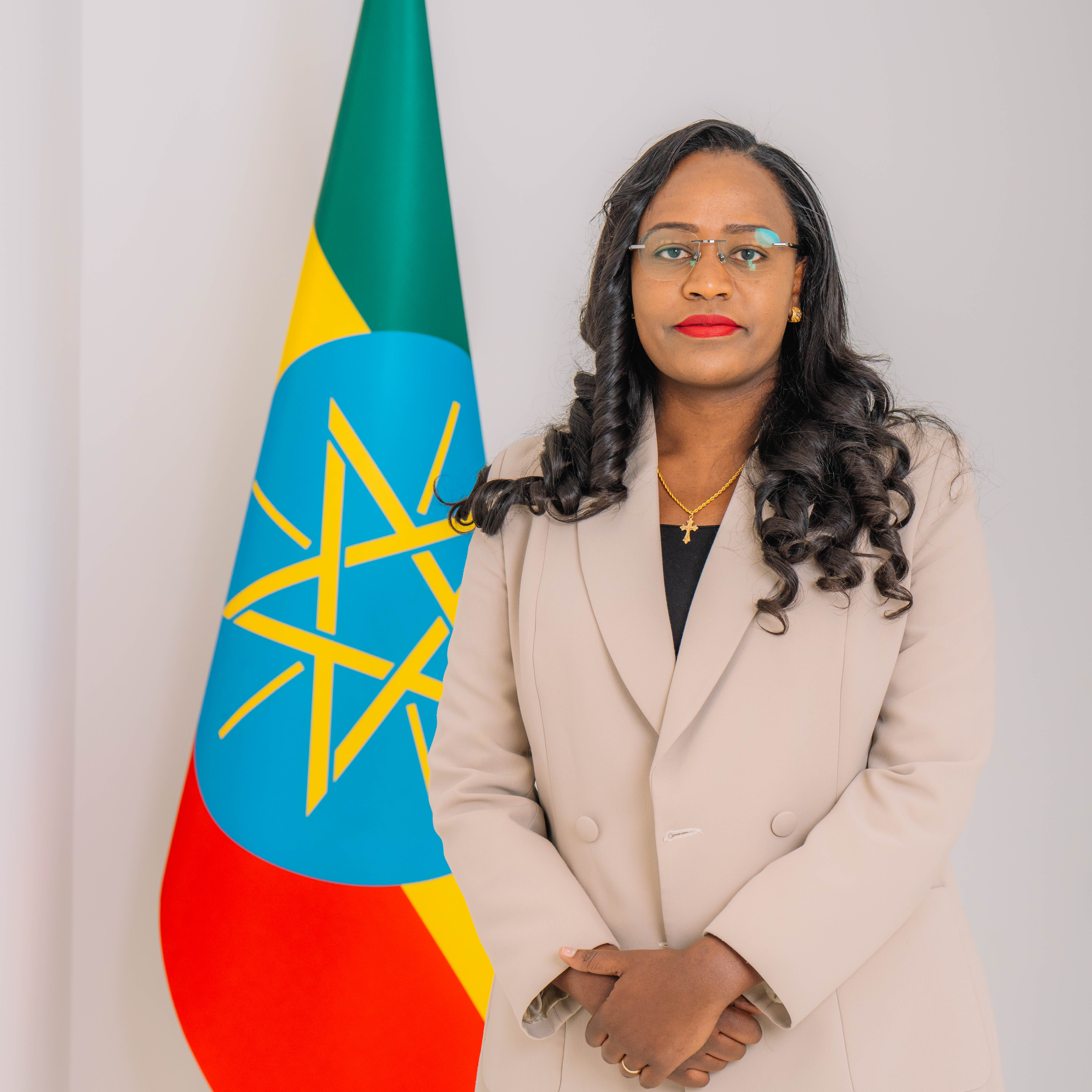

Minister of Culture and Sport

Minister
- In office 3 July 2024 – 08 October 2026
- Appointed by: Abiy Ahmed
- Preceded by: Kajela Merdassa
- Succeeded by: Selamawit Kassa

Ministry of Women and Social Affairs

Minister
- Incumbent
- Assumed office 08 October 2026
- Appointed by: Abiy Ahmed
- Preceded by: Ergoge Tesfaye

Personal details
- Born: Boloso Sore, Wolayta, Ethiopia
- Party: Prosperity Party

Shewit Shanka Shashigo, (Wolaytta: Shaashigo Shankka Shawito, Amharic: ሸዊት ሻንካ ሻሽጎ) is an Ethiopian politician who has served as Minister of Culture and Sport since July 2024 to 08 October 2026. Shewit currently working as Minister of FDRE Ministry of Women and Social Affairs since 08 October 2026.

== Career ==
Shewit represents Wolaitans in the House of Peoples' Representatives as a delegate from Boloso Sore 2 constituency. She has served her country in different levels. Prior to heading the Ministry of culture and sport Ethiopia, she was Chairperson of the Urban Infrastructure and Transport Affairs Standing Committee. She also served as manager of Addis Ababa Education and Training Quality Professional Competence and Assessment Assurance Authority.
