= Siraj Fegessa =

Ethiopian politician (born 1971)

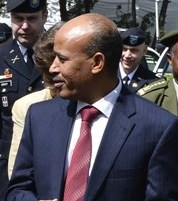

Minister of Defense
- In office 30 October 2008 – 16 October 2018
- Preceded by: Kuma Demeksa
- Succeeded by: Aisha Mohammed

Minister of Transport
- In office 20 April 2018 – 26 June 2018
- Preceded by: Ahmed Shide (as part of Minister of Communication Affairs)
- Succeeded by: office abolished

Minister of Federal Affairs
- In office 2006 – 30 October 2008
- President: Girma Wolde-Giorgis
- Prime Minister: Meles Zenawi

Personal details
- Born: 1971 (age 54–55) Ethiopian Empire
- Party: South Ethiopian Peoples' Democratic Front

Siraj Fegessa (born 1971) is an Ethiopian politician who served as Minister of Defense from 2008 to 2018 and Minister of Transportation from April to October 2018. He is a Muslim, a member of the Silte people, as well as a member of the South Ethiopian Peoples' Democratic Front, which is part of the ruling coalition, the Ethiopian People's Revolutionary Democratic Front. From 2006 until his appointment as Defense Minister on 30 October 2008, Siraj was Minister of Federal Affairs.

He has graduated with his first degree in Forestry at Haramaya University in 1995 and has two master's degrees; an MA from Azusa Pacific University in Leadership in the United States and MSC degree in Security Sector Management from Cornfield university in London (UK)'. He is the first Silte minister to be appointed in Ethiopia as well as the first to be from his party as a Defense Minister. He joined EPRDF in his twenties as a Woreda administrator in early 1990s. He served as a chief administrator of Siltie zone and played a crucial role in promoting development and mobilizing the Siltie community to fight against poverty. He became minister of Federal Affairs after EPRDF won the 2005 national election because of his exemplary leadership as a zonal administrator. and his outstanding performance in addressing the public interest of economic, social and good governance compared to the other zonal administrators. He also has done his best to build the beautiful city known as Worabe which is the capital city of the zone from scratch within few years by mobilizing the Siltie community across the nation. Because of this extraordinary performance he has been directly promoted to the ministerial post after the 2005 national election. During his high school studies, Siraj was known as one of the brightest minds among his friends. He is married and has children.
