= Abdulhalim Radwi =

Saudi painter and sculptor (1939-2006)

- Born: 1939; Mecca, Saudi Arabia
- Died: 2006 (aged 66–67); Jeddah, Saudi Arabia
- Education: Accademia di Belle Arti di Roma; Royal Academy of Fine Arts of San Fernando
- Occupations: Painter, sculptor

Abdulhalim Radwi (1939 - 2006) was a Saudi painter and sculptor. Born in Mecca, he earned a bachelor's degree from the Academy of Fine Arts in Rome and a PhD from the Royal Academy of Fine Arts in Madrid. He returned to the kingdom to teach art in Riyadh. He was the Director of the Jeddah Centre for Fine Arts from 1968 to 1974, and the General Director of Culture and Arts of Jeddah from 1980 to 1992. He died of a heart attack in Jeddah in 2006.
