= Ethiopian Intellectual Property Office =

Autonomous department in Ethiopia

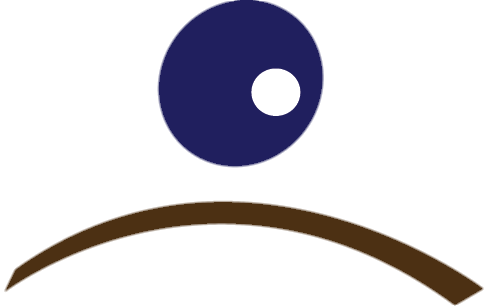
- Formation: 8 April 2003; 23 years ago
- Headquarters: Tito Street, Addis Ababa, Ethiopia
- Coordinates: 9.012678°N 38.773743°E
- Director-general: Woldu Yemessel
- Website: eipa.gov.et

The Ethiopian Intellectual Property Office (EIPO) is an autonomous unit of the Ethiopian Science and Technology Agency. It was established in 2003 to provide legal protection for Intellectual property (IP) rights. It is based in Addis Ababa.

== History ==
The Ethiopian Intellectual Property Office was established in 2003 under FDRE Proclamation No. 320/2003. It is responsible for maintaining intellectual property rights, including patents, trademarks, copyrights, and trade secrets. On 19 July 2004, Ethiopia enacted the Copyright and Neighboring Rights Protection Proclamation No. 410/2004. It was then amended by Proclamation 872/2014. It was accepted by Council of Ministry under No. 305/2014.

To acquire rights of patent, an application is required to be filled into EIPO.

== Task ==
The EIPO has a main objective to maintain intellectual property of Ethiopia and expanding laws and regulations. According to the Director-general Ermias Yemanebirhan, these laws have "laid the foundation of the recognition, certification, and protection of all forms of intellectual property rights".

Trademark law was enacted in 2006 under No. 501/2006 together with registration and protection No.273/2012.
