= Ministry of Youth and Sport (Ethiopia) =

Government ministry of Ethiopia

- የወጣቶችና የስፖርት ሚኒስቴር

Government department overview
- Formed: October 2001
- Jurisdiction: Ethiopian government
- Headquarters: Addis Ababa, Ethiopia
- Minister responsible: Ergoge Tesfaye

The Ministry of Youth and Sport is the department of the government of Ethiopia responsible for promoting community-based sport to build the nation's image and facilitate youth development. The ministry works closely with national and international stakeholders.

According to the reorganization of the Federal Democratic Republic of Ethiopian proclamation NO 471/2005, the ministry is responsible for facilitating the formation of youth organizations to support national development, monitor and support youth initiatives, enable public participation in sport, develop sports and training facilities, oversee sports medicine and combat doping, and coordinate sports associations at a national level.

== Ministers ==
The ministry is run by a minister and two state ministers.

position	name	from
minister of youth and sport	Aster Mamo	2006
