= Addisu Arega Kitessa =

Ethiopian politician

Addisu Arega Kitessa (Oromo: Addisuu Araggaa Qixxeessaa Amharic: አዲሱ አረጋ ቂጤሳ) is an Ethiopian politician who has served as Minister of Agriculture since August 2025. He previously held senior positions in the Oromia regional administration, the Oromo Democratic Party and the Prosperity Party. His appointment to continue as agriculture minister was approved by the House of Peoples' Representatives in October 2026.

== Education ==
According to his Ministry of Agriculture biography, Addisu holds a bachelor's degree in political science and international relations from Addis Ababa University and a master's degree in transformational leadership and change from the University of Greenwich.

== Political career ==
Addisu served as head of Oromia's regional communications affairs office before being appointed head of the Oromo People's Democratic Organization's political and rural mobilization bureau in April 2018.

On 18 April 2019, he was appointed head of the Oromo Democratic Party's Central Committee Office, succeeding Alemu Sime. He had previously headed the office's rural-sector cluster. He also served as head of the Prosperity Party's public and international relations division.

In February 2020, the Oromia Council approved his appointment as social-sector coordinator with the rank of deputy chief administrator. In September 2021, he became Oromia's urban development cluster coordinator. Before joining the federal cabinet, he served as Oromia's rural development cluster coordinator with the rank of deputy chief administrator.

=== Minister of Agriculture ===
On 1 August 2025, Prime Minister Abiy Ahmed appointed Addisu Minister of Agriculture, replacing Girma Amente. On 8 October 2026, the House of Peoples' Representatives approved his appointment to the same portfolio as part of a new cabinet.
