= Ministry of Defense (Ethiopia) =

Government ministry of Ethiopia

- የመከላከያ ሚኒስቴር Ministeera Raayyaa Ittisa Biyyaa (Itoophiyaa)

Agency overview
- Formed: 23 August 1995
- Jurisdiction: Government of Ethiopia
- Headquarters: Addis Ababa
- Agency executives: Aisha Mohammed, Minister of Defence; Field Marshal Birhanu Jula, Chief of the General Staff
- Child agency: Defense Industry Sector
- Website: mod.gov.et

The Ministry of Defense (Amharic: የመከላከያ ሚኒስቴር, romanized: yemekelakeya mīnīsitēri) is a cabinet-level office in charge of defense-related matters of Ethiopia. The current minister is Aisha Mohammed since 2024.

== History ==
This institution can trace its origins back to the Ministry of War, which Emperor Menelik II established in 1907, and made Fitawrari Habte Giyorgis Minister over it. Emperor Haile Selassie re-established the Ministry of War in 1942, making Ras Abebe Aregai its Minister. The Ministry is headed by a civilian minister which is a requirement of Article 87 of the current constitution of Ethiopia. It was established 23 August 1995 with the passing of Proclamation 4/1995, which also established the other 14 Ministries.

On 9 January 2022, a new building of the Ministry of Defense was inaugurated. The five floor building of more than 700 offices and facilities serves now as the headquarters of the ministry, and is located on 13 hectares of land in Addis Ababa.

== Structure ==
=== Military Industry ===
- Defense Construction Materials Production Factory
- Defense Construction Design Enterprise
- Defense Construction Enterprise
- Dejen Aviation Engineering Industry
- Homicho Ammunition Engineering Complex
- Gafat Armament Engineering Complex

=== National Defense Engineering College ===
Defense Engineering College was established in 1997 by the Ethiopian Ministry of Defense (MoD) to produce highly professional educational services.

=== Agencies ===
- Brana Printing Press

== List of ministers ==
=== Minister of War/Defence of the Ethiopian Empire ===
| No. | Portrait | Name (birth–death) | Term of office | | | Political party | Ref. |
| No. | Portrait | Name (birth–death) | Took office | Left office | Time in office | Political party | Ref. |
|---|---|---|---|---|---|---|---|
| 1 | | Habte Giyorgis | 1907 | 1926 | 19 years | Independent | |
| 2 | | Mulugeta Yeggazu | 1926 | 1936 | 10 years | Independent | |
| 3 | | Birru Walda Gabriel | 1936 | 1942 | 6 years | Independent | |
| 4 | | Abiye Abebe | 1943 | 1947 | 4 years | Independent | |
| 5 | | Abebe Aregai | 1947 | 1949 | 2 years | Independent | |
| | | Abiye Abebe | 1949 | 1955 | 6 years | Independent | |
| | | Abebe Aregai | 4 June 1955 | 17 December 1960 | 5 years | Independent | |
| | | Lieutenant General Merid Mengesha | 6 February 1961 | 5 December 1966 | 6 years | Independent | |
| | | Lieutenant General Kebede Gebre | 5 December 1966 | 28 February 1974 | 8 years | Independent | |
| | | Abiye Abebe | 28 February 1974 | 22 July 1974 | 4 months | Independent | |

=== Minister of Defense of Socialist Ethiopia ===
| No. | Portrait | Name (birth–death) | Term of office | | | Political party | Ref. |
| No. | Portrait | Name (birth–death) | Took office | Left office | Time in office | Political party | Ref. |
|---|---|---|---|---|---|---|---|
| 1 | | Major General Aman Andom | 22 July 1974 | 17 November 1974 | 4 years | Workers' Party of Ethiopia | |
| 2 | | Ambassador Ayelew Mandefro | 6 December 1974 | 19 September 1977 | | | |
| 3 | | Brigadier General Taye Tilahun | 19 September 1977 | January 1980 | | | |
| 4 | | Lieutenant General Tesfaye Gebre Kidan | January 1980 | 14 May 1988 | 7 years | Workers' Party of Ethiopia | |
| 5 | | Major General Haile Giorgis Habte Mariam | 14 May 1988 | 16 May 1989 | 1 year | Workers' Party of Ethiopia | |

=== Minister of Defense of the Federal Democratic Republic of Ethiopia (1991-present) ===
| No. | Portrait | Name (birth–death) | Term of office | | | Political party | Cabinet(s) | Ref. |
| No. | Portrait | Name (birth–death) | Took office | Left office | Time in office | Political party | Cabinet(s) | Ref. |
|---|---|---|---|---|---|---|---|---|
| | | Siye Abraha | 1991 | August 1995 | 4 years | | | |
| | | Tamrat Layne | August 1995 | October 1995 | 2 months | | | |
| | | Tefera Walwa | October 1995 | 1999 or after | | | | |
| | | Abadula Gemeda (born 1958) | 16 October 2001 | 2005 | 3–4 years | Oromo Democratic Party | | |
| | | Kuma Demeksa (born 1958) | 2005 | 30 October 2008 | 2–3 years | Oromo Democratic Party | Zenawi | |
| | | Siraj Fegessa (born 1971) | 30 October 2008 | 16 October 2018 | 10 years, 170 days | SEPDM | Zenawi; Desalegn | |
| | | Aisha Mohammed (born 1970) | 16 October 2018 | 18 April 2019 | 184 days | ARDUF | Ahmed | |
| | | Lemma Megersa (born 1970) | 18 April 2019 | 18 August 2020 | 1 year, 122 days | Oromo Democratic Party | Ahmed | |
| | | Kenea Yadeta | 18 August 2020 | 6 October 2021 | 1 year, 49 days | Independent | Ahmed | |
| | | Abraham Belay | 6 October 2021 | 20 May 2024 | 2 years, 227 days | Prosperity Party | Ahmed | |
| | | Aisha Mohammed | 20 May 2024 | Incumbent | 1 year, 167 days | ARDUF | Ahmed | |

== See also ==
- DAVEC
