= Hirut Kassaw =

Ethiopian politician and teacher

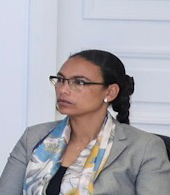
- Hirut in 2019

Ministry of Culture and Tourism
- In office 16 October 2018 – 6 October 2021
- Preceded by: Fozia Amin
- Succeeded by: Kajela Merdassa (Culture); Nassise Chali (Tourism)

Head of the Amhara National Regional State Culture and Tourism Bureau
- In office 2015 – October 2018

Personal details
- Born: Kefoy, Begemder Province, Ethiopia (now South Gondar Zone, Ethiopia)
- Party: Prosperity Party
- Education: Addis Ababa University; Bahir Dar University; Kotebe Teachers Education College

Hirut Kassaw (Ge'ez: ሕሩት ካሳው) is an Ethiopian politician who has served as Ministry of Culture and Tourism of Ethiopia from October 2018 until 6 October 2021. Before being Minister, Hirut served as assistant professor at Bahir Dar University. The ministry that she leads has received an award from the Pacific Travel Writers Association (PATWA). She also won the "Best Tourism Minister" award.

== Early life ==
Hirut was born and raised in Kefoy, South Gondar, Ethiopia. She was born in the countryside, but as a child she had the opportunity to move to the city because her father was a civil servant. She completed her primary and secondary education in Debre Tabor. After graduating from high school, she served as a teacher in different parts of Ethiopia, and when she was teaching in Sebeta she joined the Kotebe Teachers Education College, Addis Abeba, and earned a Bachelor of Arts in Ethiopian Language and Literature. She also has a Master's degree from Bahir Dar University and Doctor of Philosophy from Addis Ababa University.

== Career ==
Hirut began teaching at Tulubolo High School in the southwestern Shoa Zone. She served as a teacher for 25 years in different parts of Ethiopia, Woliso, Injibara, and Sebeta. As she completed her Master's degree at Bahir Dar University, she became a teacher of Amharic language. After serving for four years, she left Bahir Dar University, and joined Addis Ababa University to follow her Doctor of Philosophy.

Hirut was serving as head of the Amhara National Regional State Culture and Tourism Bureau before being nominated to the Ministry that she has led since October 2018.

== Awards ==
The Ministry of Culture and Tourism, that she leads, was awarded by the Pacific Travel Writers Association (PATWA) at the International Tourism Bourse (ITB) in Berlin in 2020. She was also awarded as "2019 Best Tourism Minister" which is from Street of Gold Foundation.
