= Poverty in Ethiopia =

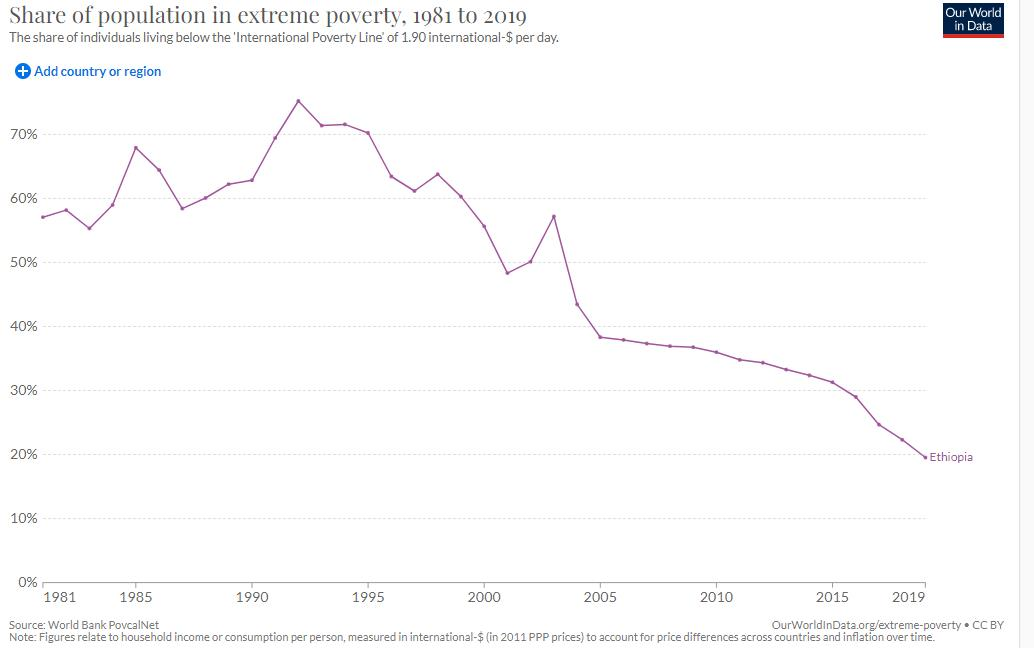
Share of population in extreme poverty over time

The African country of Ethiopia has made strides towards alleviating poverty since 2000 when it was assessed that their poverty rate was one of the greatest among all other countries. The country has made great strides in different areas of the Millennium Development Goals including eradicating various diseases and decreasing the rate of child mortality. Despite these improvements, poverty is still extremely high within the country. Based on the most recent data from 2019, 68.7% of the population is affected by multidimensional poverty and an additional 18.4% vulnerable to it. One of the leading factors in driving down poverty was the expansion of the agricultural sector. Poor farmers have been able to set higher food prices to increase their sales and revenue, but this expansion has come at a cost to the poorest citizens of the country, as they could not afford the higher priced food. One of the biggest challenges to alleviating this issue is changing the structure of Ethiopia's economy from an agricultural-based economy to a more industry-based economy. The current strategy for addressing poverty in Ethiopia is by building on existing government systems and development programs that are already in place within the country.

== Marginality ==
Due to the lack of progress in reducing the rate of poverty in Ethiopia, a map of marginality was created for the region to survey the state of poverty. In Marginality as a Root Cause of Poverty: Identifying Marginality Hotspots in Ethiopia, Gatzweiler defines marginality as "an involuntary position and condition of an individual or group at the margins of social, political, economic, ecological, and biophysical systems, that prevent them from access to resources, assets, services, restraining freedom of choice, preventing the development of capabilities, and eventually causing extreme poverty". Marginality does not operate as a means to analyze the causes of poverty, rather it serves as a main cause of poverty itself and calls for a deeper analysis of the position of individuals within their society. Marginality directly deals with social webs and systems and how individuals have a sociological effects on the essential functions of everyday society. There are hotspots of marginality in the South-West and North regions of the country. Some strong indications of high marginality among poor agro-ecological conditions and ethnically homogeneous areas. The agro-ecological zones with the highest levels of marginality were found among the Kolla and Bertha zones, both of which have extremely arid temperatures. The study also found that areas of high marginality had one ethnicity that made "up more than 95% of the population". The study estimates that almost 6 million people live in marginal hotspot areas.

=== 1984 famine in Ethiopia ===
The famine in Ethiopia in 1984 served as the beginning of a country-wide famine that lasted for at least 20 years after the crisis itself. According to the study Hunger and Poverty in Ethiopia: local perceptions of famine and famine response, "In 2003, up to 15 million people were considered food insecure." 2002 served as a key year where food security was extremely low, and that food production since the initial famine was on a continual decline throughout various political regimes. The strategy was to improve their agricultural sector and attempt to improve livestock and working conditions, though more negative practices were adopted such as begging, stealing, as well as having a smaller diet. Food aid and food for work programs were effective methods of intervention at the time though they were not sustainable practices. A recent study analyzed the relationship between crop choice and household poverty in Ethiopia. The study showed that households who practice crop diversification are more likely to be alleviated out of poverty than households who specialize crop production. The key conclusion stated that increased crop diversity reduces the probability of being in poverty, and that agricultural diversification is associated with poverty reduction. Researchers believe that these findings should be implemented in developing effective policies for household risk management.

== Status of Poverty – 2017 ==
Despite great strides in development efforts within Ethiopia, the outcome of these efforts is still not sufficient to meet the demands the country needs. Ethiopia serves as a strong example of the effects of natural disasters on poor environments, as the Indian Ocean Dipole-induced Horn of Africa drought and floods disrupted the lives of 10.5 million Ethiopians. Many problems arose such as malnutrition and outbreaks in multiple types of diseases. Ethiopia was in a State of Emergency from October 2016 until August 2017. According to the UNICEF Annual Report 2017 on the status of Poverty in Ethiopia, "A total of 1.3 million people were internally displaced as a result of conflict and drought by the end of 2017." Due to their current obstacles with natural disasters and widespread displacements of citizens, leaders in development are working especially hard to create lasting infrastructure and sustainable resources. The biggest goal within development efforts is to provide a holistic childhood educational program to improve the quality of education in the country, as well as make great efforts to end the practice of child marriage.

Ethiopia has been successful in implementing many Millennium Development Goals by the year 2015, in which progress among different sectors has resulted in a lower poverty rate. The country has been able to achieve many MDGs through the implementation of the Plan for Accelerated and Sustained Development to End Poverty (PASDEP) from the year 2005 until 2010, then the implementation of the First Growth and Transformation Plan (GTP I) from the years 2010–2015. Ethiopia is currently implementing the Second Growth and transformation Plan (GTP II) "whose major objectives include maintaining the strong growth averaged 11 percent achieved in the past, deepening economic transformation, and aiming to become a lower middle income and carbon neutral status by 2025." Despite this, based on the most recent data from 2019, 68.7% of the population continues to be affected by multidimensional poverty and an additional 18.4% vulnerable to it.
