= Ministry of Women and Social Affairs (Ethiopia) =

Government ministry of Ethiopia

- የሴቶችና ማህበራዊ ጉዳይ ሚኒስቴር

Agency overview
- Formed: 2014; 12 years ago
- Preceding agency: Ministry of Labour and Social Affairs
- Jurisdiction: Ethiopian government
- Headquarters: Kazanchis, Kirkos district, Addis Ababa, Ethiopia
- Minister responsible: Shewit Shanka
- Website: www.mowsa.gov.et

The Ministry of Women and Social Affairs (Amharic: የሴቶችና ማህበራዊ ጉዳይ ሚኒስቴር, MoWSA) is an Ethiopian government department responsible for ensuring women's rights and supporting their role in social, political and cultural participation, as well as protecting children's welfare and rights in the country. It was established in 2014 under Proclamation No.263/2014. The ministry was made of merging the previous Ministry of Labour and Social Affairs (MoLSA) into one identity.

- Filsan Abdullahi, 12 March 2020 – 27 September 2021
- Ergoge Tesfaye, 6 October 2021 – 07 October 2026
- Shewit Shanka, 07 October 2026 - present
