= Ministry of Labor and Social Affairs (Ethiopia) =

Ethiopian government department

- የሠራተኛና ማህበራዊ ጉዳይ ሚኒስቴር

Agency overview
- Formed: 12 August 1957; 68 years ago
- Jurisdiction: Ethiopia
- Headquarters: Addis Ababa, Ethiopia
- Minister responsible: Muferiat Kamil
- Website: www.eservices.gov.et/topic/subtopic/2

The Ministry of Labor and Social Affairs (Amharic: የሠራተኛና ማህበራዊ ጉዳይ ሚኒስቴር) is the Ethiopian government department established in 1957. Until the ministry got its current name in 1977, it was called the Ministry of Community Development, then the Ministry of Community Development and Social Affairs.

== History ==
The Ministry of Labor and Social Affairs was established in 1957 by Proclamation 15 as the Ministry of Community Development during the reign of Haile Selassie, and this name stayed for nearly a decade, after which it was renamed to the Ministry of Community Development and Social Affairs in 1966 by Proclamation 46.

In 1977, during the derg regime, the ministry was named the Ministry of Labor and Social Affairs. It is under the leadership of Ergoge Tesfaye since 16 October 2018. The ministry has two main sections, named Labor Affairs, and Social Affairs; the latter has two directorates, Employment and Peaceful Industrial Relation Directorate and Overseas Employment and Workers Safety Protection Directorate.

== List of ministries ==
List of ministers for Labor and Social Affairs, and prime minister or emperor and presidents during their minister-ship
Number	Name	From	To	Prime minister/Emperor	President
1	Abdulfetah Abdulahi Hassen	??	??	Meles Zenawi	Girma Wolde-Giorgis
2	Hirut Woldemariam	April 2018	16 October 2018	Abiy Ahmed	Sahle-Work Zewde
3	Ergoge Tesfaye	16 October 2018	present	Abiy Ahmed	Sahle-Work Zewde
4	Ergoge Tesfaye	16 october 2018	present	Abiy Ahmed	Taye Atske Selassie Amde President of Ethiopia
