= Growth and Transformation Plan =

Ethiopian national five-year plan from 2010 to 2015

The Growth and Transformation Plan (GTP) was a national five-year plan created by the Ethiopian government to improve the country's economy by achieving a projected gross domestic product (GDP) growth of 11-15% per year from 2010 to 2015. The plan included details of the cost (estimated at US$75–79 billion over the five years) and specific targets the government expected to hit by pursuing the following objectives.

== Details ==
The main points of the plan were:

- Encouraging large-scale foreign investment opportunities, primarily in the agricultural and industrial sectors.
- Completing Ethiopia's membership in the World Trade Organization and improving the country's commercial regulatory framework.
- Providing basic infrastructure in four industrial cluster zones.
- Renewing focus on natural resource and raw material industries such as gold, oil, gas, potash, and gemstones.
- Increasing road networks by 10,000 miles throughout the country.
- Building a 1,500 mile-long standard gauge rail network and creating manufacturing plants for locomotive engines and railway signaling systems.
- Quadrupling power generation from 2,000 to 10,000 megawatts, building 82,500 miles of new power distribution lines, and rehabilitating 4,800 miles of existing power transmission lines.
- Seeking investment in renewable energy projects involving hydro, wind, geothermal, and bio fuels to take advantage of the global focus on renewable energy.
- Increasing mobile telephone subscribers from 7 to 40 million and Internet service subscribers from less than 200,000 to 3.7 million.

== Framework ==
The Growth and Transformation Plan was established by the government as a strategic framework for the agricultural sector from 2011 to 2015. The GTP aimed to:

- Enhance productivity and production of smallholder farmers and pastoralists
- Strengthen marketing systems
- Improve participation and engagement of the private sector
- Expand the amount of land under irrigation
- Reduce the number of chronically food-insecure households

== Target results ==
The overall target is at least 8.1% annual agricultural growth over the five-year period. Sub-sectoral targets include tripling the number of farmers receiving relevant extension services, reducing the number of safety net beneficiaries from 7.8 to 1.8 million households, and more than doubling the production of key crops from 18.1 million metric tonnes to 39.5 million metric tonnes. Specific targets are aligned with and in support of the targets contained in the CAADP Compact and other Ministry of Agriculture-led initiatives.

== Agricultural Transformation Agency ==
The Agricultural Transformation Agency's programs were designed to help all partners meet the targets. The Agency will measure its contribution to the effort through the metrics established in the GTP as well as in other national strategies such as the CAADP Compact and the corresponding Policy and Investment Framework (PIF). The Agency's work to support the GTP was organized under the AGP's four strategic objectives that together would contribute to Ethiopia's goal of achieving middle income status by 2025:

- Achieve a sustainable increase in agricultural productivity and production
- Accelerate agriculture commercialization and agro-industrial development
- Reduce degradation and improve productivity of natural resources
- Achieve universal food security and protect vulnerable households from natural disasters

== Summary ==
The Ministry of Finance and Economic Development published the Growth and Transformation Plan online. Ethiopia started the Poverty Reduction Strategy Paper process in 2000, and by 2002 had issued the first three-year Sustainable Development Poverty Reduction Programme (SDPRP), which covered 2002–2005. Under the umbrella of the Development Assistance Group (DAG), in-country staff of bilateral and multilateral donor agencies undertook a review of the final Ethiopian SDPRP and the results of this work were presented a Joint Partner Review (JPR).

The aim of the exercise was to develop a joint in-country perspective on the quality of the SDPRP that would help inform our overall response as development partners – both at the IMF/World Bank Board. In 2005, Ethiopia launched the first five-year Plan for Accelerated and Sustainable Development to End Poverty (PASDEP) carrying forward the SDPRP strategic directions but also bringing in new elements and scaling up the efforts to achieve the Millennium Development Goals. The second Growth and Transformation Plan was published by the National Planning Commission and the GTP II was the mandate of the National Planning Commission.
