= Ahmed Shide =

Ethiopian politician

- Axmed Shiide
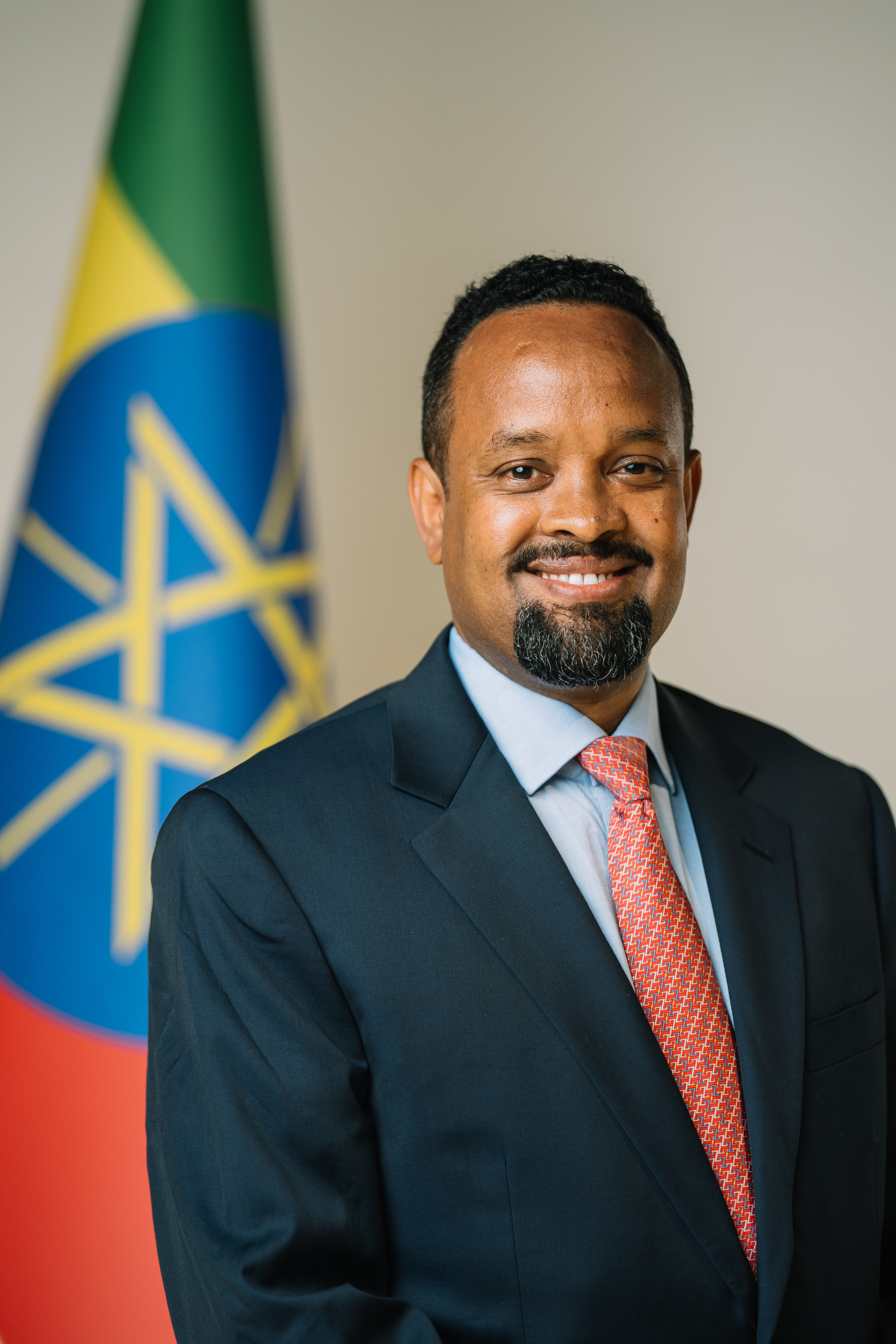

Speaker of the House of Peoples' Representatives
- Incumbent
- Assumed office 5 October 2026
- Preceded by: Tagesse Chafo

Minister of Finance
- In office 16 October 2018 – 5 October 2026
- President: Sahle-Work Zewde; Taye Atske Selassie
- Prime Minister: Abiy Ahmed
- Preceded by: Abraham Tekeste
- Succeeded by: Fitsum Assefa

Minister of Communication Affairs
- In office 19 April 2018 – 16 October 2018
- Prime Minister: Abiy Ahmed
- Preceded by: Negeri Lencho
- Succeeded by: post abolished

State Minister of Finance and Economic Development
- In office 2009 – 1 November 2016
- Prime Minister: Meles Zenawi; Hailemariam Desalegn

Personal details
- Born: Negele Borana, Ethiopia
- Party: Prosperity Party
- Other political affiliations: Ethiopian People's Revolutionary Democratic Front; Ethiopian Somali People's Democratic Party
- Education: Ethiopian Civil Service College; University of Sussex (M.A); Institute of Social Studies (Diploma); Greenwich University (MBA)
- Other offices: March 2003 – September 2004: Chairman of Pastoral Affairs Committee (Somali Region); September 2004 – October 2005: Head of the President Office (Somali Region); October 2005 – September 2006: Head of Civil Service Improvement Bureau (Somali Region)

Ahmed Shide is an Ethiopian politician who has served as the Minister of Finance of Ethiopia since October 2018. He was formerly the Minister of Communication Affairs from April to October 2018, until the ministry was dissolved by the cabinet of Abiy Ahmed—the Prime Minister of Ethiopia.

He was also the former chair of the Somali political party of the Somali Regional State. He is a member of the federal parliament and was a member of the former Ethiopian Somali People's Democratic Party (ESPDP). He is also member of Prosperity Party.

== Early life and education ==
Ahmed Shide was born in Nagele to a less well off Gurre parents belonging to the Madahweyne a subclan of the Dir Somali. Ahmed completed his primary, secondary and tertiary education in Ethiopia. He holds a Bachelor of Arts in Economics from Ethiopian Civil Service College, Addis Ababa.

Shide also holds a Masters of Arts in Participation, Development and Social Change from the Institute of Development Studies, University of Sussex, United Kingdom, Post-Graduate Diploma in Managing Rural Resources and Resource Conflicts from the Institute of Social Studies, The Hague, the Netherlands, and MBA from Greenwich University, London, United Kingdom.

== Career ==
Before assuming office as Minister of Finance, Shide served as Minister of Transport and also as Minister of Government Communication Affairs of Ethiopia. Even before that, he served as state minister of the Ministry of Finance and economic development for more than eight years, where he led the countries economic cooperation and regional development and integration agenda. He was the one who championed and spearheaded the economic reform of Ethiopia and contributed to the significant development achievements of the country recorded over the past decades. At the moment he is the one leading the economic reform, which aims at boosting private participation and better economic efficiency. He also served the government at regional state level.

Shide also served in Somali Region major offices during Meles Zenawi premiership, notably the as Chairman of Pastoral Affairs Committee (from March 2003 to September 2004), Head of the President Office (from September 2004 to October 2005) and Head of Civil Service Improvement Bureau (from October 2005 to September 2006).

Shide assumed the office of Minister of Finance on 16 October 2018, replacing Abraham Tekeste. By mid-2019, he proposed to parliament 386.9 billion birr ($13.48 billion) in government spending for the 2019/2020 budget. Also during his time in office, Ethiopia announced plans to split its state telecoms provider Ethio telecom into two business units along infrastructure and service sector lines before it is privatized. In late 2020, he oversaw negotiations with the International Monetary Fund on a $2.9 billion programme, one of the biggest in the fund’s history in Africa.

In addition to his role in government, Shide has been a member of the World Bank Group’s (WBG) Advisory Council on Gender and Development. He was recognized as 100 Reputable Africans in 2025.

== Other activities ==
- African Development Bank (AfDB), Ex-Officio Member of the Board of Governors (since 2018)
- World Bank, Ex-Officio Member of the Board of Governors (since 2018)
