= Selamawit Kassa =

Ethiopian politician

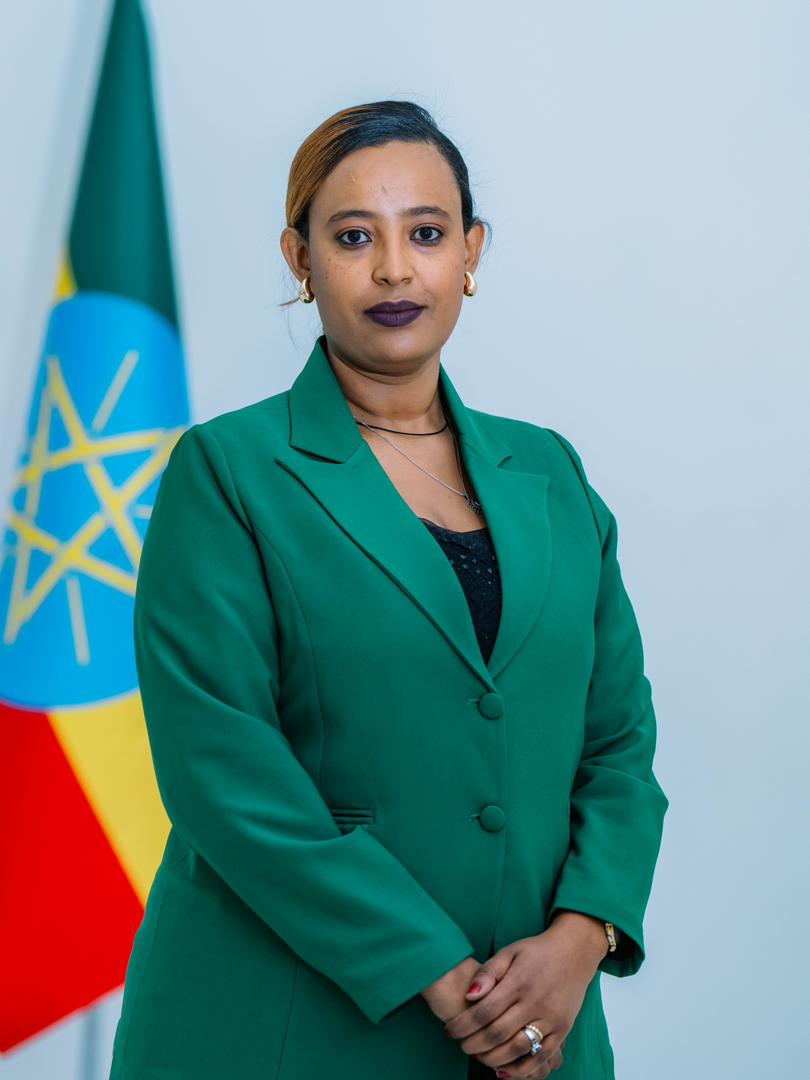

Minister of Tourism
- Incumbent
- Assumed office 18 October 2024
- Prime Minister: Abiy Ahmed
- Preceded by: Nassise Chali

Deputy Minister of Government Communication Services
- In office 31 October 2021 – 18 October 2024

Selamawit Kassa (Amharic: ሰላማዊት ካሳ) is an Ethiopian politician who is currently serving as Minister of Tourism since 2024. She was Deputy Minister of Government Communication Services from 31 October 2021.

== Government positions ==
Selamawit Kassa has been Minister of Government Communication Services from 31 October 2021. On 18 October 2024, Selamawit appointed as Minister of Culture and Tourism which was later approved by the House of Peoples' Representatives (HoPR).
