= Ergoge Tesfaye =

Ethiopian politician

- እርጎጌ ተስፋዬ
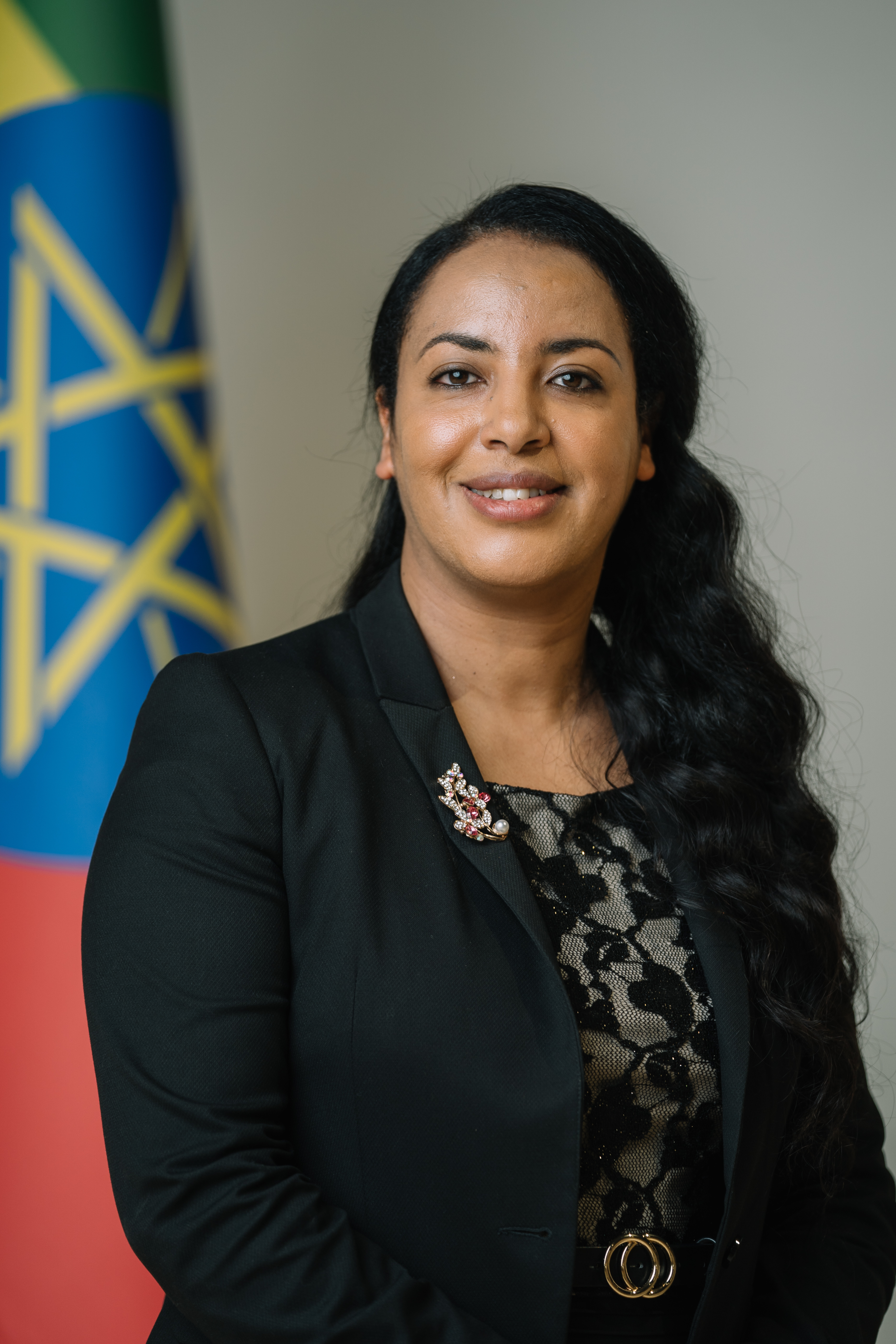

Minister of Women and Social Affairs
- In office 6 October 2021 – 7 October 2026
- President: Sahle-Work Zewde; Taye Atske Selassie
- Prime Minister: Abiy Ahmed
- Preceded by: Filsan Abdullahi
- Succeeded by: Shewit Shanka

Minister for Labor and Social Affairs
- In office 16 October 2018 – 6 October 2021
- President: Sahle-Work Zewde
- Prime Minister: Abiy Ahmed
- Succeeded by: Muferiat Kamil

Research and Community Service Vice President at Wachamo University
- In office 2016 – October 2018

Personal details
- Born: Hossana, Hadiya, Ethiopia
- Party: Prosperity Party

Ergoge Tesfaye (Ge'ez: እርጎጌ ተስፋዬ) is an Ethiopian politician who is currently serving as the Minister of Women, Children and Youth since 6 October 2021. She also served as a Minister for the Minister of Labour and Skills Development from 2018 to 2021.

== Early life ==
Ergoge was born in Hosaena, Hadiya, Ethiopia and raised in Addis Ababa, and Hosaena. She was born to a teacher family, and attended her primary school in her home town, but left her home town when she was a second grader and resumed her education in capital of Ethiopia, Addis Abeba. As she completed grade 10, her family went back to Hossana, and this let Ergoge complete her secondary school in her home town. As Ergoge completed her secondary school, she went back to Addis Ababa and joined Addis Ababa University, where she awarded Bachelor of Arts in Foreign Language and Literature. She also earned Master of Arts in Gender Studies, and Doctor of Philosophy in Social Anthropology from India.

== Career ==
After completing her BA in Foreign Language and Literature, Ergogie became an English teacher for two years in Gimbichu high school. Before becoming a Minister for Labor and Social Affairs, Ergoge served as a teacher and director of the Gender and HIV Protection office in Saint Mary's University (Ethiopia), and Research and Community Service Vice President at Wachamo University.
