= Ministry of Culture and Tourism (Ethiopia) =

Government ministry of Ethiopia

- የባህልና ቱሪዝም ሚኒስቴር

Agency overview
- Headquarters: Sudan St, Addis Ababa, Ethiopia; 9.016867°N 38.749278°E
- Annual budget: $462 million (2012)
- Agency executive: Shewit Shanka (Culture) Selamawit Kassa (Tourism)
- Child agencies: Authority for Research and Conservation of Cultural Heritage; Ethiopian Wildlife Conservation Authority; National Archives and Library Agency; Ethiopian National Theatre
- Website: Official website

The Ministry of Culture and Tourism (Amharic: የባህልና ቱሪዝም ሚኒስቴር) is the Ethiopian government department responsible for researching, preserving, developing, and promoting the culture and tourist attractions of Ethiopia and its peoples, both inside the country and internationally. In doing so the Ministry closely works together with different national and international stakeholders.

== Overview ==
The Ministry of Culture and Tourism is responsible for developing and promoting tourism in Ethiopia, and to boost sustainable socio-economic and political values with popular and stakeholder's participation.

Subordinate bodies include the Authority for Research and Conservation of Cultural Heritage (ARCCH), Ethiopian Wildlife Conservation Authority (EWCA), National Archives and Library Agency, and Ethiopian National Theatre.

The Ministry publicizes the country's resources of tourist attractions and encourages the development of tourist facilities. It also licenses and supervises establishments of tourist facilities such as hotels and tour operators, and sets the standards for them.

Ethiopia has abundant natural tourist attractions, including nine World Heritage Sites, but the Ministry of Culture and Tourism still struggles to attract tourists in decent numbers owing to poor investment, security, and does not have any cohesive tourism development or promotion strategy. As a result most tourists fly over Ethiopia to Kenya, Uganda, Tanzania, South Africa to name a few countries. Nevertheless the Ministry puts out regular press releases every year claiming 800-950,000+ tourist have visited Ethiopia every year, despite Ethiopia having only about 3000 hotel rooms, and of that only 2000 are tourist class rooms.

== Ministers ==
The Ministry is run by a Minister and two state Ministers.

| Position Director General | Name | Date of appointment |
|---|---|---|
| Minister of Tourism | Selamawit Kassa (Tourism) | 3 July 2024 |
| Minister of Culture | Shewit Shanka (Culture) | 3 July 2024 |
| Minister of Culture and Tourism | Hirut Kassaw | 2018 |
| State Minister of Culture and Tourism | Buzena Al Kedir | 2018 |
| State Minister of Culture and Tourism | Bizunesh Meseret | 2018 |
| Tourism Expert on Culture and Tourism | Getinet Yigzaw | [?] |
| Cultural development expert in Culture and Tourism | [data missing] | [?] |
| Former Tourism Stakeholders Relation Expert & Currently Coordinator for Domestic Tourism Development | Tewodros Habtamu | 2018 |
| [data missing] | Mekonnen Gebre Egziabher | 2014 |
| [data missing] | Tesfaye Yimer | 2012 |

== Controversy ==
Despite its role to promote tourism in Ethiopia, the ministry has been embroiled in a major international scandal surrounding the Celebration of the Ethiopia Millennium in 2007. Despite written promises to reimburse participants for travel and expenses, as well as paying the hosting and production costs, in order to improve Ethiopia's poor international image at their own expense, Mohamouda Ahmed Gaas and officials from the Ministry simply refused to honor these commitments once the girls came to Ethiopia and the pageant took place, citing poverty. Mohamouda Ahmed Gaas the former State Minister and person behind this event, at one point went as far as stating that Sheik Mohammed Al Amoudi had promised, but later failed to pay a portion of the hosting cost to the Ministry, as well as many other reasons for not paying.

During the visit to Ethiopia, the 37 contestants were paraded around state-owned enterprises by Mohamouda Ahmed Gaas who were all promoted as lead sponsors and were even received by the President Girma Wolde-Giorgis, and also visited the African Union Headquarters, in Addis Ababa.

For two years the UK based organiser had been pressing the Ministry and various Officials of the Government of Ethiopia to pay them for the service obtained by Mohamouda Ahmed Gaas in his capacity as, the Ethiopian State Minister for Culture and Tourism representing the Ministry but the Ministry and Mohamouda Ahmed Gaas simply refused to pay a single penny of the costs to the company. since November 2007.

The winners were never paid their prizes, nor were any of the technical crew ever paid. The hosting fee for Miss Tourism of the Millennium was also apparently never paid, and over US$250,000 in sponsorship money collected from local sponsors on instructions of Mohamouda Ahmed Gaas the Chairman of the fund-raising committee disappeared from the account. Several contestants were never reimbursed for their travel expenses to Ethiopia as promised by Mohamouda Ahmed Gaas.

After two years of diplomatic negotiations with the Ministry and the Ethiopian Ambassador to the UK Ambassador Berhanu Kebede, in December 2009 in an unprecedented and landmark legal action, the company commenced formal legal action in the Royal Courts of Justice to recover the missing money and for breach of contract against the Ministry and Mohamouda Ahmed Gaas. In the High Court of Justice, Queens Bench Division, seeking a total payment of US$1,022,810.52, comprising US$488.500.00 principal debt and US$543,310.52 interest and late fees.

Since 2007, Miss Tourism of the Millennium pageant has not been hosted in Ethiopia. Instead Ethiopia and the Ministry face an international cultural boycott by all the top International pageant organisations.

In 2010, the Ministry of Culture and Tourism was one more at the center of a controversial Beauty pageant called Miss Ethiopia 2010.

The Ministry officials Mohamed Dirir, and Mohamouda Ahmed Gaas were fully involved and sanctioned the pageant in their official capacities, the pageant which postponed many times saw the eventual winner promised lavish prizes of a car, and cash awards for the runners up, plus participation in international pageants.

It later emerged that Murad Mohammed the director of this version of Miss Ethiopia did not have any formal legally binding contract from the sponsor to provide any car to the winner, the pageants he also claimed to be sending the winners to did not recognize his claims as he did not hold any franchises rights to the pageants, and to date none of the girls from Miss Ethiopia 2010 have attended any of the International pageants he claimed they would, nor did they get their cash awards.

State run Ethiopian Television also made a documentary about this controversial pageant titled Ethiopian beauty contest that went wrong, available and posted on YouTube, in which unusual in a country like Ethiopia, contestants, former queens and models openly criticized the Minister Mohamed Dirir, and state Minister Mohamouda Ahmed Gaas and the Ministry of Culture and Tourism for once again modeling in beauty pageants, and this time going as far as supporting a known con man, who had previously cheated so many people, and had no track record in the pageant industry, instead of focusing on promoting tourism which is their core objective and mandate.
