= Timeline of Addis Ababa =

Chronological aspect of Addis Ababa, the capital of Ethiopia

The following is a historical events of Addis Ababa, the capital of Ethiopia, including its formation prior to 20th century by chronology.

== Prior to 20th century ==
- 15th century – "Barara" was identified as possible location of the city
- 1450 – Italian cartographer, Fra Mauro depicted the city standing between Mounts Zikwala and Menegasha
- 1529 – Ethiopian-Adal War, the Adal Sultanate entirely sacked the city under general Ahmad ibn Ibrahim al-Ghazi .
- 1884 – Mount Entoto was founded by Negus and later Emperor Menelik II
- 1886 – The city's former name called Finfinne renamed "Addis Ababa" ("New Flower") by Taytu Betul, Empress Consort of the Ethiopian Empire.
- 1889 – Population: 15,000 (estimate).
- 1891 – Ethiopian Empire capital relocated to Addis Ababa from Entoto (approximate date).
- 1896 – St. George's Cathedral built.
- 1897
  - Harar-Addis telephone line constructed.
  - Hospital opens.

== 20th century ==
- 1903 – Eucalyptus trees planted.
- 1904
  - Mint established.
  - Asmara – Addis telephone line constructed.
- 1906 – Telegraph office and Menelik II school established.
- 1907
  - Ras Makonnen bridge constructed.
  - Itegue Taitu Hotel in business.
- 1908 – Tefere Makonnen high school established.
- 1913 – Courrier d'Ethiopie newspaper begins publication.
- 1917 – Djibouti-Addis Ababa railway begins operating.
- 1922
  - Nasibu Emmanual becomes mayor.
  - Leprosy hospital built.
- 1924 – Medhane Alem school established.
- 1928 – Empress Menen school established.

=== 1930s–1940s ===
- 1930
  - 2 November: Haile Sellasie crowned "King of Kings of Ethiopia."
  - Guenete Leul Palace built.
  - Population: 80,000 (estimate).
- 1935 – Hager Fikir Association formed.
- 1936
  - April: Aerial bombing by Italian forces.
  - 5 May: City taken by Italian forces.
  - City becomes capital of Italian East Africa.
  - Giuseppe Bottai becomes governor, succeeded by Alfredo Siniscalchi.
- 1937
  - 19 February - Attempted assassination of Rodolfo Graziani at Viceregal Palace.
  - 19–20 February: Crackdown by Italian forces on Ethiopian population.
- 1938 – Francesco Camero Medici becomes governor.
- 1939 – Enrico Cerulli becomes governor, succeeded by Guglielmo Nasi.
- 1940
  - Giuseppe Daodice becomes governor.
  - Hailé Sélassié Stadium opens.
- 1941
  - Agenore Frangipani becomes governor.
  - 5 May: Haile Selassie returns.
  - Addis Zemen Amharic-language newspaper begins publication.
- 1942 – Holy Trinity Cathedral built.
- 1943 – Haile Selassie I school established.
- 1944 – Public library inaugurated.
- 1945 – Anbessa City Bus Service founded.
- 1947 – Addis Ababa Chamber of Commerce founded.

=== 1950s–1960s ===
- 1950 – University College of Addis Ababa established.
- 1952 – Prince Makonnen school established.
- 1955 – Jubilee Palace and Haile Sellasie I Theatre built.
- 1958
  - Institute of Archaeology founded.
  - Economic Commission for Africa headquartered in city.
- 1960
  - December: Coup attempt.
  - Koka Dam constructed.
- 1961
  - Bole Airport established.
  - United Nations Economic Commission for Africa headquartered in Addis Ababa.
- 1963
  - Organization of African Unity headquartered in Addis Ababa.
  - Orchestra Ethiopia, Addis Ababa Bank, and Addis Ababa University's Institute of Ethiopian Studies established.
- 1965
  - Council of the Oriental Orthodox Churches held.
  - Population: 560,000.
- 1966
  - Centre International de Developpement et de Recherche and Ethiopian Wildlife and Natural History Society headquartered in Addis Ababa.
  - University Students' Union of Addis Ababa established.

=== 1970s–1980s ===
- 1974
  - February: Demonstrations.
  - Addis Ababa Fistula Hospital in operation.
- 1975
  - Population: 1,161,267.
  - Kebeles established.
- 1977
  - February: Coup at Menelik Palace.
  - Alemu Abebe becomes mayor.
- 1984
  - Addis Ababa Museum established.
  - Population: 1,412,575.
- 1987 – City becomes capital of People's Democratic Republic of Ethiopia.

=== 1990s ===
- 1991
  - Finfinne become the capital city of the Oromia Region.
  - City taken by Ethiopian People's Revolutionary Democratic Front.
  - An ammunition warehouse explodes, killing 100
  - Ethiopian Economic Association headquartered in Addis Ababa.
- 1992 – Ethiopian International Institute for Peace and Development headquartered in Addis Ababa.
- 1994
  - Theological College of the Holy Trinity re-opens.
  - Population: 2,112,737.
- 1995
  - Addis Ababa "given the status of self-governed city."
  - The Reporter newspaper begins publication.
- 1996
  - Addis Chamber International Trade Fair begins (approximate date).
  - Goshu Art Gallery and Asni Gallery founded.
- 1998 – Addis Ababa Ring Road construction begins.
- 1999
  - Mojo-Addis Ababa highway constructed.
  - Ethiopian National Archives and Library established.

== 21st century ==
=== 2000s ===
- 2000
  - City administrative areas reorganized into 10 sub-cities: Arada, Addis Ketema, Akaki Kalati, Bole, Cherkos, Gulele, Kolfe Keranio, Lideta, Nefas Silk, and Yeka.
  - Oromia's capital relocated from Finfinne to Adama.
  - Addis Ababa Women Entrepreneurs Association and Universal Arts and Crafts gallery established.
  - November: Burial of Haile Selassie.
- 2001 – City plan adopted.
- 2002
  - African Union headquartered in Addis Ababa.
  - AIDS Resource Center launched.
  - Population: 2,646,000.
  - Bole Airport new terminal opens.
- 2003 – Arkebe Oqubay becomes mayor.
- 2004 – Ethiopian Orthodox Library-Museum inaugurated.
- 2005
  - Oromia's capital restored to Addis Ababa
  - Election protest.
- 2006
  - 12 May: Bombings.
  - Federation of African Societies of Chemistry headquartered in Addis Ababa.
- 2007
  - Addis International Film Festival begins.
  - Dembel Mall built.
- 2008
  - Addis Ababa Women’s Affairs Bureau established.
  - Kuma Demeksa becomes mayor.
  - April–May: African Championships in Athletics held.
- 2009 – Cinema Yoftahe opens.

=== 2010s ===
- 2011 – Jazzamba Lounge (nightclub) in business.
- 2012
  - Muslim protest.
  - African Union Conference Center inaugurated.
- 2013 – 2 June: Anti-government protest.
- 2017
  - Addis Ababa–Djibouti Railway in operation.
  - The Koshe landfill collapses, burying stick and brick houses, killing many people.
  - Population: 4,215,965 (estimate).
- 2018
  - Takele Uma Benti becomes mayor.

=== 2020s ===
- 2020
  - Adanech Abebe becomes a Deputy mayor, being the first female mayor to hold a position.
- 2021
  - Adanech Abebe reelected as a mayor
  - United Front of Ethiopian Federalist and Confederalist Forces groups close in on Addis Ababa and threaten to take it.

== See also ==
- History of Addis Ababa
- Timeline of Ethiopia

== Bibliography ==
Published in 19th-20th century

- "Capital of Abyssinia". Scottish Geographical Magazine. 1895.
- P.H.G. Powell-Cotton (1902). "Adis Ababa". A Sporting Trip through Abyssinia. London: Rowland Ward.
- "Addis Ababa is New Town of Ethiopia". New York Times. May 3, 1936.
- Richard Pankhurst (1961). "Menelik and the Foundation of Addis Ababa". Journal of African History. 2 (1): 103–117. doi:10.1017/S0021853700002176. JSTOR 179586. S2CID 162496774.
- W. T. S. Gould (1973). "Provision of Secondary Schools in African Cities: A Study of Addis Ababa". Town Planning Review. 44 (4): 391–403. doi:10.3828/tpr.44.4.gjp8500406g838tq. JSTOR 40102950.
- J. John Palen (1974). "Housing in a Developing Nation: The Case of Addis Ababa". Land Economics. 50 (4): 428–434. Bibcode:1974LandE..50..428P. doi:10.2307/3145012. JSTOR 3145012.
- Ahmend Zekaria; et al., eds. (1987). Proceedings of the International Symposium on the Centenary of Addis Ababa 1986.
- Alain Gascon [in French] (1995). "La naissance du paysage urbain à Addis Abäba (Birth of the Urban Landscape in Addis Ababa)". In Alessandro Triulzi (ed.). Fotografia e storia dell'Africa (in French). Università degli Studi di Napoli "L'Orientale". OCLC 34610996.
- Peter P. Garretson (2000). A History of Addis Abäba from Its Foundation in 1886 to 1910. Otto Harrassowitz Verlag. ISBN 978-3-447-04060-0.

Published in 21st century

- City Government, City Development Plan 2001-2010, Addis Ababa
- Paul Tiyambe Zeleza; Dickson Eyoh, eds. (2003). "Addis Ababa, Ethiopia.". Encyclopedia of Twentieth-Century African History. Routledge. ISBN 0415234794.
- Kwame Anthony Appiah; Henry Louis Gates, eds. (2005). "Addis Ababa". Africana: The Encyclopedia of the African and African American Experience (2nd ed.). Oxford University Press. p. 33. ISBN 978-0-19-517055-9.
- M. Rutten and T. Degefa (2005). "Addis Ababa". In K. Shillington (ed.). Encyclopedia of African History. Taylor & Francis. ISBN 978-1-57958-245-6.
- Bahru Zewde (2005). "The City Centre: a Shifting Concept in the History of Addis Ababa". In Abdoumaliq Simone; Abdelghani Abouhani (eds.). Urban Africa: Changing Contours of Survival in the City. London: Zed Books. ISBN 1842775936.
- Annabel Erulkar; et al. (2006). "Migration and Vulnerability among Adolescents in Slum Areas of Addis Ababa, Ethiopia". Journal of Youth Studies. 9.
- Ethiopia: Addis Ababa Urban Profile. United Nations Human Settlements Programme. 2008.
