= Ali Abdo =

Ali Abdo may refer to:

- Ali Abdo (football chairman) (1928–1980), Iranian boxer and founder of Persepolis F.C.
- Ali Abdo (wrestler) (born 1981), Australian freestyle wrestler
- Ali Abdo (motorcyclist) (born 1984), Egyptian long-distance motorcycle rider
- Ali Abdo (politician), Ethiopian politician
