= List of cement manufacturers in Ethiopia =

This is the list of cement manufacturers in Ethiopia.

== List ==
Name	Parent company	Year established/operation	Ref
Derba MIDROC Cement	MIDROC	2012	
Habesha Cement	Habesha Cement S.C.	2008	
Lemi National Cement Factory	West China Cement East African Holding Company	2024	
Messebo Cement Factory	Endowment Fund for the Rehabilitation of Tigray	1997	
Mugher Cement Enterprise	Ethiopian government	1984	
