= Kuma Demeksa =

Ethiopian politician and diplomat (born 1958)

- Kumaa Dammaqsaa

Ambassador of Ethiopia to Germany
- Incumbent
- Assumed office 24 April 2015
- Preceded by: Fesseha Asghedom

29th Mayor of Addis Ababa
- In office 30 October 2008 – 8 July 2013
- Preceded by: Berhane Deressa
- Succeeded by: Diriba Kuma

Minister of Defence
- In office 2005–2008
- Preceded by: Abadula Gemeda
- Succeeded by: Siraj Fegessa

President of the Oromia Region
- In office 28 October 1995 – 24 July 2001
- Preceded by: Hassan Ali
- Succeeded by: Junedin Sado

Personal details
- Born: Taye Teklemariam Tokon; 1958 (age 67–68) Gore, Illubabor Province, Ethiopian Empire
- Party: OPDO
- Other political affiliations: EPRDF
- Children: 2

Kuma Demeksa (Oromo: Kumaa Dammaqsaa; born 1958) is an Ethiopian politician. Since 24 April 2015, he has been an Ethiopian ambassador to Germany. From 2008 to 2013 he was mayor of Addis Ababa; previous positions include President of the Oromia Region (1995–2001), and Minister of Defense (2005–2008). He was one of the founders, as well as a current member, of the Oromo Peoples' Democratic Organization (OPDO), which is part of the ruling coalition, the Ethiopian People's Revolutionary Democratic Front (EPRDF).

== Early life ==
Kuma was born in Gore with the name "Taye Teklemariam", a town in the Illubabor Zone, the oldest of three children. His father is Wodajo Tokon, a priest, who took the name Teklemariam after baptism; his mother is Muluye. He attended the Menelik II Primary School in Bore, despite a daily walk of 12 kilometers to and from school; he attended Haileselassie I Senior Secondary School up to the tenth grade, when the Red Terror closed his school. He then joined the army and was sent to the Jimma Police Training Camp in 1976. Not much is known about his years in the military, and his family had assumed he was dead when he returned to Gore in 1991 with his first wife and their daughter. Other sources claim that he spent several years as a prisoner of war in the Eritrean war, and languished in the Eritrean People's Liberation Front’s jails in Nakfa. In circumstances that remain murky, Kuma and several other prisoners were released from Eritrean imprisonment to join the Ethiopian Peoples Democratic Movement (which later joined the Tigrean Peoples Liberation Front (TPLF) to form the ERDPF) and fight against the Derg in the Ethiopian Civil War.Taye, after given a name "Kuma" became an ethnic Oromo and joined (found) OPDO.

== Political career ==
Following the fall of the Derg in 1991, Kuma was appointed as the Minister of Internal Affairs, the security agency of the Transitional Government of Ethiopia, which was dissolved four years later with the founding of the Federal Republic, at which time Kuma Demeska became President of Oromia. However, on 24 July 2001 he was replaced as President of Oromia by Junedin Sado, as well as expelled from the Central Committee. This was part of the fallout of an internal split within the TPLF, senior partner in the ERDPF alliance, which left Prime Minister Meles Zenawi, Sebhat Nega and Arkebe Oqubay on the one side, and Tewolde Wolde Mariam, Siye Abraha and Gebru Asrat on the other. Kuma was remembered as acting as a peacemaker between the two factions. Despite this setback, he was reappointed the Central Committee of the OPDO in 2003, and was also appointed as one of the three state ministers for Capacity Building.

In 2015, he is appointed ambassador to Germany, with accreditions to the Czech Republic, Ukraine and Slovakia.
