= Habesha Cement S.C. =

Ethiopian cement manufacturer

- Native name: ሀበሻ ሲሚንቶ
- Company type: Share
- Founded: September 2008; 17 years ago
- Headquarters: Getas International Building 7th Floor, Addis Ababa, Ethiopia
- Products: Cement
- Production output: 1.4 million tons (2017)
- Brands: Ordinary Portland Cement; Portland Pozzolana Cement
- Revenue: 4.85 billion birr (2024)
- Operating income: 1.03 billion Br (2023)
- Website: habeshacement.com

Habesha Cement S.C. (Amharic: ሀበሻ ሲሚንቶ) is an Ethiopian cement manufacturer based in Walmara woreda, Oromia Region, Ethiopia. Established in 2008, the factory was formed by more than 16,000 shareholder with capital of 3,854,134,643.48 birr. Its Oromia Region's plant has 29.8 hectares of land, comprising over 800 permanent and temporary employees including 8 key executives.

Habesha Cement envisioned to become the leading cement factory and other construction inputs supplier and the first choice in East Africa.

== History ==
Habesha Cement S.C. was established in September 2008 by more than 16,000 shareholders with a capital of 3,854,134,643.48 birr. Its plant site area is 29.8 hectares located in Walmara woreda in Holeta, Oromia Region. The company comprises over 800 permanent and temporary employees including 8 key executives.

Habesha envisioned to become the leading integrated cement industry and other construction inputs supplier and the first choice in East Africa with the missions of producing optimum quality cement for construction required by the g national and international standards and customer expectation at affordable price.

In May 2014, Habesha Cement secure 60 year mining sector from the Ministry of Mines, granting to mine limestone, gypsum, clay and sandstone from 112 hectares of lands located in West Shewa Zone in Oromia Region.

== See also ==
- List of cement manufacturers in Ethiopia
