= Messebo Cement Factory =

Ethiopian cement factory

- Location within Ethiopia
- Built: February 1997; 29 years ago
- Operated: December 1999
- Location: Mekelle, Tigray Region, Ethiopia
- Coordinates: 13.894°N 39.528°E
- Industry: Cement
- Products: Portland cement
- Employees: 500
- Volume: over 2 million tones
- Website: Official website

Messebo Cement Factory is an Ethiopian cement factory based in Mekelle, Tigray Region. It was established in 1997 and is the subsidiary of the Endowment Fund for the Rehabilitation of Tigray (EFFORT).

It is best known of producing Portland cement with annual production of 900,000 tonnes.

== History ==
Messebo Cement Factory was established in February 1997 and completed in December 1999. It is the subsidiary of Endowment Fund for the Rehabilitation of Tigray (EFFORT), with its plant located in Mekelle, Tigray Region. Messob's annual production is 900,000 tonnes, producing Portland cement with or without additives.

In April 2017, the factory acquired 200 German made MAN transport trucks at a cost of 700 million birr.

== See also ==
- List of cement manufacturers in Ethiopia
