= Mayor of Addis Ababa =

Head of executive branch of Addis Ababa's municipal government

- የአዲስ አበባ ከንቲባ
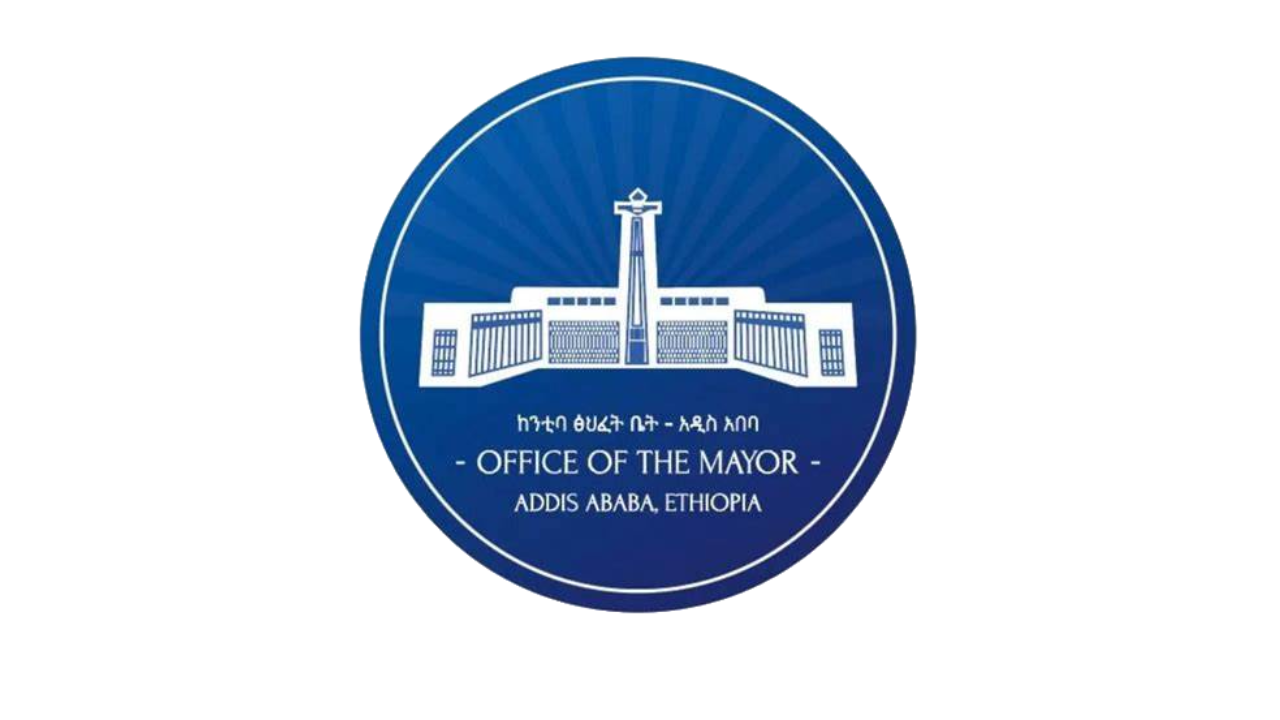
- Emblem of the Addis Ababa City Administration adopted since 2020

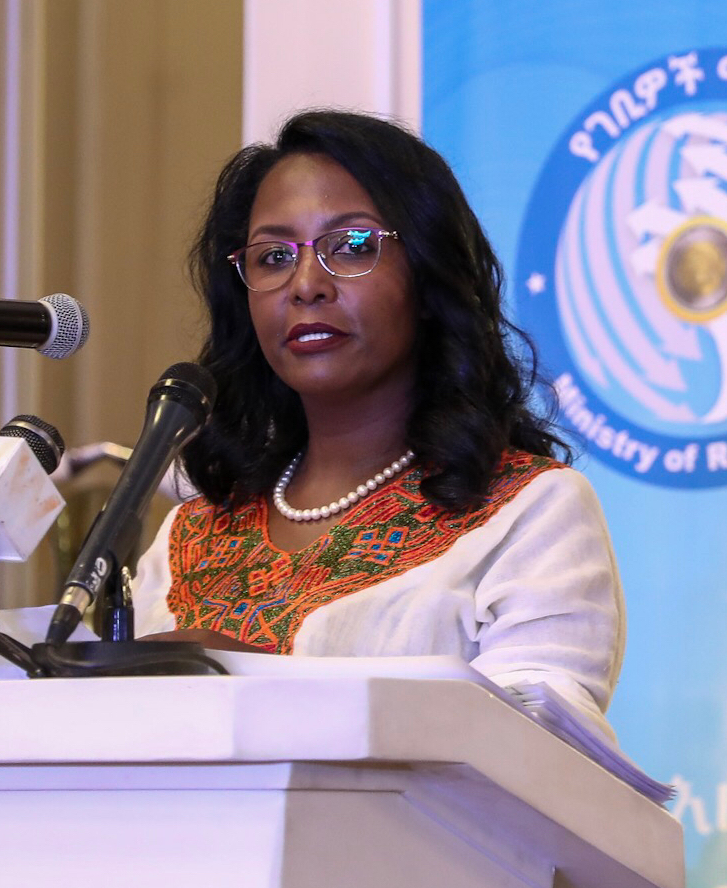
- Incumbent; Adanech Abebe since 28 September 2021
- Style: His/Her Honor
- Inaugural holder: Woldetsadik Goshu
- Formation: 1910

The Mayor of Addis Ababa (Amharic: የአዲስ አበባ ከንቲባ, romanized: Ye’ādīsi Ābeba Kenitība) is head of the executive branch of Addis Ababa's municipal government. The mayor's office is located in Addis Ababa City Hall. Adanech Abebe is the first woman mayor and 32nd mayor of Addis Ababa since 28 September 2021.

The incumbent mayor Adanech Abebe was the Attorney General of Ethiopia before being elected as mayor.

The mayoral office was established in 1910.

== Deputy mayor ==
Being accountable to the mayor, the responsibilities of the deputy mayor include acting on behalf of the mayor in the absence or incapability of the latter, and performing other functions as assigned to him/her by the mayor.

== List of mayors ==
=== Lord mayor (Kantiba) ===
Name	Image	In office	Note
Bitwoded Wolde Tsadik Goshu		1910–1917	
Bitwoded Haile Giyorgis Woldemikael		1917–1918	
Yegezu Behabte		1918	
Dejazmach Wossene Zeamanuel		1918	
Dejazmach Matebe Tessema		1918	
Blattengeta Heruy Wolde Selassie		1918–1922	
Nasibu Zeamanuel		1922–1931	
Ras Makonnen Endelkachew		1932–1934	
Dejazmach Bitwoded Tengashaw Behabte		1934–1936	
Dejazmach Takele Woldehawariat		1936	Acting

=== Italian governors during occupation ===
Tenure	Incumbent	Notes
5 May 1936 – 27 May 1936	Giuseppe Bottai, Governor	
1 June 1936 – 23 September 1938	Alfredo Siniscalchi, Governor	
23 September 1938 – 1 January 1939	Francesco Camero Medici, Governor	
1 January 1939 to 5 May 1939	Enrico Cerulli, Governor	
5 May 1939 – 2 June 1940	Guglielmo Nasi, Governor	
2 June 1940 – 3 April 1941	Giuseppe Daodice, Governor	
3 April 1941 – 6 April 1941	Agenore Frangipani, Governor	

=== Restored lord mayor ===
Name	Image	In office	Note
Ras Abebe Aregai		1941	
Dejazmach Takele Woldehawariat		1942	
Dejazmach Kebede Tesema		1942–1946	
Ras Mesfin Sileshi		1947	
Demissie Wolde Amanuel		1947–1956	
Blattengeta Zewde Belayneh		1956–1957	
Dejazmach Zewde Gebre-Sellassie		1958–1960	
Zewde Gebrehiwot		1960–1969	
Haile Giorgis Workneh		1969–1973	
Makkonen Mulat		1973–1974	

=== Mayors ===
In 1974, Emperor Haile Selassie was deposed in a coup d'etat, Ethiopia was proclaimed a republic, and all noble and aristocratic titles were abolished.

Name	Image	In office	Note
Makkonen Mulat		1974–1977	
Alemu Abebe		8 December 1977 – 1985	
Zewde Tekle		1985–1989	
Gizaw Nigusse		1989–1991	
Mulu Alem Abebe		1991–1993	
Tefera Waluwa		1993–1998	
Ali Abdo		1998–2003	
Arkebe Oqubay		24 January 2003 – 9 May 2006	
Berhane Deressa		9 May 2006 – 30 October 2008	Acting
Kuma Demeksa		30 October 2008 – 9 July 2013	
Diriba Kuma		9 July 2013 – 17 July 2018	
Takele Uma Benti		17 July 2018 – 18 August 2020	
Adanech Abebe		28 September 2021 – present	Deputy from 18 August 2020 to 28 September 2021

== See also ==
- List of governors of the Regions of Ethiopia
