= Berhane Deressa =

Ethiopian politician

- ብርሃኔ ደረሳ

Acting Mayor of Addis Ababa
- In office 9 May 2006 – 30 October 2008
- President: Girma Wolde-Giorgis
- Prime Minister: Meles Zenawi
- Preceded by: Arkebe Oqubay; Berhanu Nega (elect)
- Succeeded by: Kuma Demeksa

Personal details
- Party: Ethiopian Peoples' Revolutionary Democratic Front

Berhane Deressa (Amharic: ብርሃኔ ደረሳ) is an Ethiopian politician who was the Acting Mayor of Addis Ababa from 9 May 2006 to 30 October 2008, succeeding Arkebe Oqubay.

== Later years ==
After serving as mayor, Berhane retired from politics and moved to the United States where he lives in Alexandria, Virginia.
