= Junedin Sado =

Ethiopian politician

Junedin Sado Junaddiin Saaddoo ጁነዲን ሳዶ

President of the Oromia Region
- In office 28 October 2001 – 6 October 2005
- Preceded by: Kuma Demeksa
- Succeeded by: Abadula Gemeda

Personal details
- Born: Oromia Zone, Ethiopia

Junedin Sado (or Juneidi Sado) is an Ethiopian politician who served as the president of Oromia Region from 2001 to 2005. He was a member of Meles Zenawi's cabinet and the Oromo Peoples' Democratic Organization.

== Life and career ==
He was educated at Addis Ababa University (Geology), the University of East Anglia (Environmental Sciences), the University of Birmingham and Azusa Pacific University.

Junedin was President of the Oromia Region from 28 October 2001 until 6 October 2005 when he was replaced by Abadula Gemeda. He subsequently was appointed Transport and Communication Minister, which is the office he was holding when Prime Minister Meles Zenawi moved him to the Science and Technology Ministry October 2008. Following the 2010 general election, Junedin was appointed Minister of Civil Service.

In July 2012 his wife, Habiba Mohammed, was arrested with 29 others. Habiba was charged with funnelling money from the Embassy of Saudi Arabia to Islamist terror groups in Ethiopia. In her defense, Junedin claimed that he had approached the Saudi Arabian Embassy privately for money to build a mosque and fulfil the wishes of his late mother. Junedin was subsequently fired from his position on the executive committee of the Oromo Peoples' Democratic Organization in September, and was released from his position as Minister of Civil Service 29 November.

Ethiochannel, a pro-government private newspaper based in Addis Ababa, reported in February 2013 that Junedin Sado fled to Kenya. Junadin is alleged to have entered the United States and accepted asylum. He returned to Ethiopia in 2018.
