= Derba MIDROC Cement =

Ethiopian cement manufacturer

- Operated: 5 February 2012
- Location: Addis Ababa, Ethiopia
- Coordinates: 8.980°N 38.757°E
- Industry: Cement
- Products: Derba-Mugher Cement
- Employees: 2,000 (739 permanent workers)
- Volume: 5,600 tons per day of clinker and 7,000 tons per day
- Owner: MIDROC
- Website: www.derbacement.com

Derba MIDROC Cement (Amharic: ደርባ ሚድሮክ ሲሚንቶ) is a cement manufacturer in Ethiopia known for a plant located 70 km north of Addis Ababa, Ethiopia. It was inaugurated in 2012 and approved for operation in 2015.

== History ==
Derba MIDROC Cement inaugurated on 5 February 2012 with the presence of Prime Minister Meles Zenawi and other officials. In November 2015, the plant project was approved for the operation.

== See also ==
- List of cement manufacturers in Ethiopia
