= History of Addis Ababa =

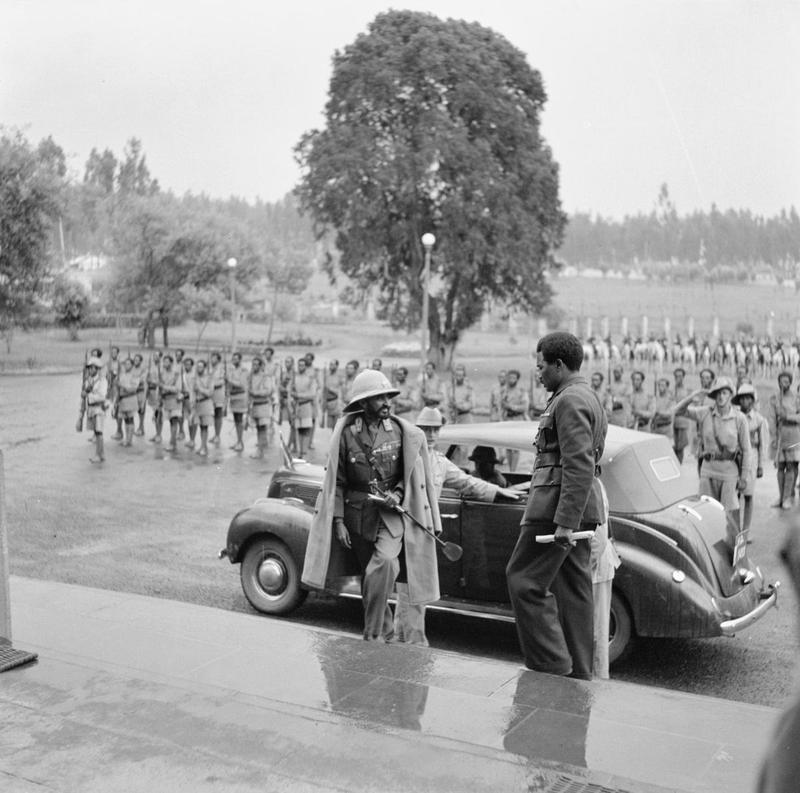
Emperor Haile Salassie enters Addis Ababa in 1946

The history of Addis Ababa, capital of Ethiopia, formally begins with the founding of the city in the 19th century by Ethiopian Emperor Menelik II and his wife Empress Taytu Betul. In its first years the city was more like a military encampment than a town. The central focus was the emperor's palace, which was surrounded by the dwellings of his troops and of his innumerable retainers. In the 1920s, Addis Ababa experienced a significant economic upturn, marked by a surge in the number of middle-class-owned buildings, including stone houses furnished with imported European furniture. The middle class also introduced newly manufactured automobiles and expanded banking institutions. Urbanization and modernization persisted during the Italian occupation, guided by a masterplan aimed at transforming Addis Ababa into a more "colonial" city, a trajectory that continued beyond the occupation. Subsequent master plans, formulated from the 1940s onward with the input of European consultants, focused on the development of monuments, civic structures, satellite cities, and the inner city.

== Prehistory ==
A DNA studies shows from 1,000 people that humans began migrating from Addis Ababa vicinity around the globe for 100,000 years. Other studies confirmed that Africans have more diverse gene than other continents, but new research indicated genetic diversity declination steadily happens while ancestors travelled to Addis Ababa, which roughly a site of exiting "out of Africa" migration. Science journal offered a deductive evidence that ancient explorers emerged from the region to colonized the rest of continents. Similarity, the Nature published that the greater geographic distance between a population and its African ancestors, the more accumulated gene changes occurs.

== 19th-century ==
=== Prelude ===
Regarding the foundation, Mount Entoto has been a watershed for establishment of Addis Ababa. Addis Ababa is surrounded by Entoto to the north, Yerrer to the east, and the most prominent Menagesha to the west. The area generally served as a garrison town of which generals allocated an encampment (safar) to settle troops. According to Wolde-Mariam (1976), urbanization faced formidable problems due to large-scale conflict with warlords, which converted into garrison town.

Before the advent of Addis Ababa, there were many sites in the surrounding areas that had been used as temporary capitals for the Kingdom of Shewa. Ankober, a site about 160 km north of Addis Ababa, served as the capital of the kingdom of Shewa during the second half of the 18th century. As evidence, the ruins of the palace are still found on the lip of the great escarpment, which is popular in its breath-taking view. The village of Aliyu Amba, which was the most important market center of the Shewa Kingdom, is also located below Ankober palace at one of the broken hills. Other areas, like Wechecha, Yerrer and Entoto were also temporarily used as capitals of the Shewan Kingdom.

Menelik, as Negus (Note: Roughly equivalent to King.) of Shewa, had found Mount Entoto a useful base for military operations in the south of his realm. In 1879, Menelik visited the reputed ruins of a medieval town and an unfinished rock church that showed proof of an Ethiopian presence in the area prior to the campaigns of Ahmad Ibrahim. His interest in the area grew when his wife Taytu began work on a church on Entoto. In addition, Menelik endowed a second church in the area.

In 1881, Menelik moved the capital of Shewa from Ankober to Entoto. A relocation of imperial nobilities and armies shaped political atmosphere. In addition, there was also a categorization of the imperial army at the time; fitawrari, loyal to Menelik's expansionism, thrusts to the west and south; on the right wing of the army, to the north, lay the safar of his powerful generals and his cousin, Mekonnen; on the left wing, to the south, lay lesser generals and to the east protect the rear of army lay the palace of dejazemach or commander of rearguard. Between them were scattered subordinates and lesser nobility.

Major safar was expanse that delimited rival army and prevents from potential clashes. Other factors that give boundary was the presence of streams and deep gorges, including the Kebenna, Kechene, Qurtume, and a small Akaki River. There were also a marketplace in the mid area led by Negadrass and was home of foreign elite community; mostly French, Armenians and Indians citizens. The original land charter identified safar besides parishes (atbiya) into division into sections. However, with the presence of military, safar always important than atbiya for locating the city.

=== Founding ===
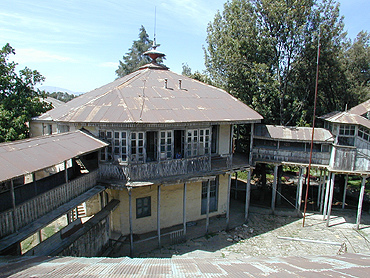
Menelik Palace pictured in 2008. It was constructed in 1890

Soon after Menelik II established his capital on Mount Entoto, he and his wife Taytu Betul were soon attracted southwards to the nearby hot springs of Finfinne. At the end of the rainy season in 1886, Menelik and Tatyu, went down to Finfinne along with their retainers and erected a large number of tents. Tatyu, admiring the scene from the door of her royal tent, is said to have ask Menelik to give her the land to build her a house there. He replied, "Begin by building a house; after that I will give you a country." "Where should I build my house?", she inquired. "On this spot", Menelik replied pointing to a large tree, "which my father King Sahle Selassie surrounded with a fence: go there and build your house. Once," he continued, "in this very place Sahle Selassie made the following prophecy, 'O land, today you are full of Gallas, but one day my grandson will build here a house and make you a city.'" That very week, Tatyu decided to construct a house; her steward was given orders to start at once, the work was completed not long after.

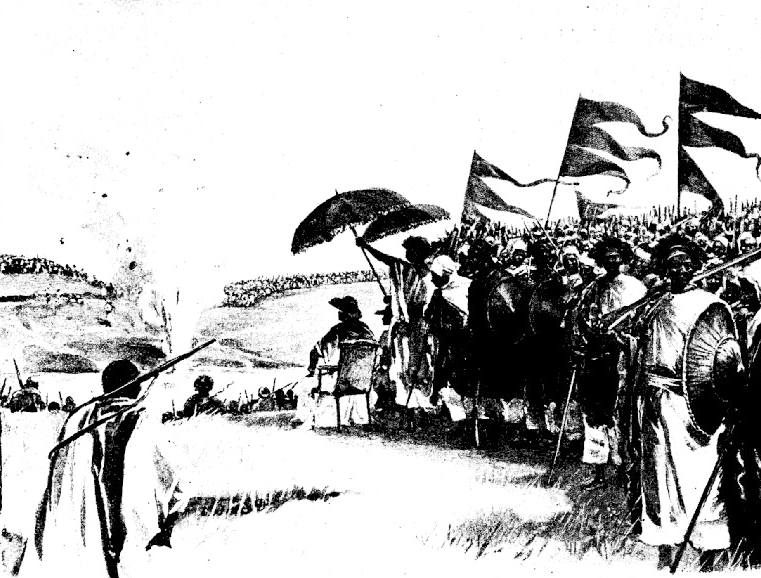
Emperor Menelik II (far right seated) with retinues watching dynamite testing near Addis Ababa early 1890s. Published in the French magazine Le Tour du Monde (1896 issue)

In the following year of 1887, Tatyu left her camp at Entoto and established herself in her new house above the hot springs. The building of the town soon commenced, all the chiefs were allocated sections of land around the royal area and began building their own dwellings. The new settlement was then given the name of Addis Ababa or "new flower". In 1889 Negus Menelik expanded his wife's house to become the Imperial Palace, which remains the seat of government in Addis Ababa today. Between 1889 and 1891, Addis Ababa became capital of Ethiopian Empire when Menelik II became Emperor of Ethiopia, after becoming the capital of Ethiopian Empire, Addis Ababa grew by leaps and bounds and took on the character of a boomtown. The definite building of Addis Ababa began in the year of 1891, when Menelik ordered French engineers to build the very first stone houses. The main distribution of this land was given to various foreigners who were assured that Addis Ababa would never be abandoned in favor of Entoto or any other place. These foreigners, which included Europeans, Armenians and Indians, had begun to establish themselves in the town, where their presence and commercial activity led to a steady rise in land values and ground rents, while the legations of the British, French, Italians and Russians later established themselves in the settlement. After 1896, the city slowly transformed from military encampment to civilian town. When this happens, travellers and sportsmen often commented look like a "vast camp" or "collection of village" rather than what they perceived town.

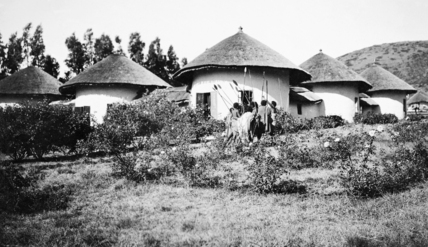
Early urban dwelling and buildings typically consisted of cluster of huts. Here is an example British legation in Addis Ababa (1910)

Because of the sizeable population of Addis Ababa, a degree of labor specialization not seen elsewhere in the empire was possible and Addis Ababa became the site of many of Ethiopian innovations. The rapid growth of Addis Ababa, especially soon after the Battle of Adwa, was accompanied by the construction of some of Ethiopia's first modern roads, large estates were also granted to various notables who served at the Battle of Adwa such as Tekle Haymanot of Gojjam, Ras Makonnen, Habte Giyorgis Dinagde and Mikael of Wollo. Early its founding, foreigners had an interest to complement as metropolitan, by expanding buildings. Much of its settlement consisted of hut complex, constructed with mud and straw plastered on wooden frame, and thatched roofs. The city further transformed rapidly without planned intention. By 1910, the city had approximately 70,000 permanent inhabitants and also had between 30,000 and 50,000 temporary inhabitants.

== 20th-century ==
=== Pre-Italian occupation (1916–1935) ===
Ras Tafari, later became Emperor Haile Selassie had a considerable influence in the city after his appointment in 1917. He raised awareness for modernization by distributing wealth to emerging class. Gebrehiwot Baykedagn started occupying the major administrative division post, as he ruled as inspector of Addis Ababa—Djibouti railway in 1916, which also connects Addis Ababa with French Somaliland port of Djibouti.

By 1926 and 1927, Addis Ababa saw economic revolution, a surplus of coffee production was growing as a result of capital accumulation. In addition, the bourgeoisie benefited the city with large income of goods. They constructed new, stone-fitted house with imported European furniture and an importation of latest automobile, and expansion of banks across the locales. Total register automobiles were 76 in 1926, and summed up to 578 in 1930.

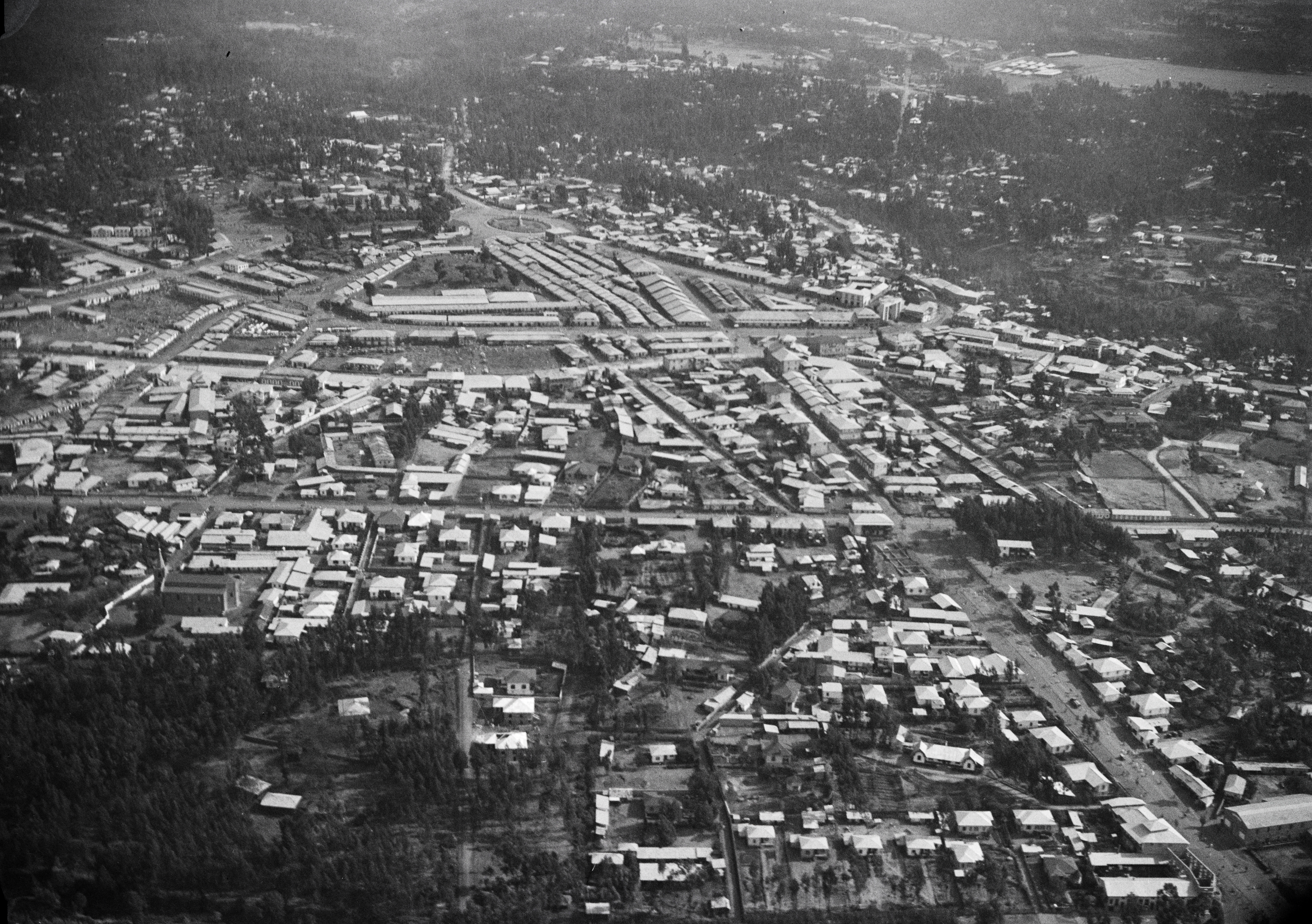
Aerial view of Addis Ababa in 1934

Road transportation were very unpopular to the city and the country until the opening of Addis Ababa—Djihour Ridge, about 97 miles northward in the direction of Dessie. This road was considered the longest continuous motor route, which initially connecting Italian occupied Assab in Eritrea and Addis Ababa via Dessie as accorded to Italo-Ethiopian Treaty of 1928. The highway were very important to French owned railway of Djibouti because of freight rate were very high caused by lack of competition, and believed that considerable amount of cargo would be increase between Ethiopia and Massawa. Significant merchants of Addis Ababa were received by Tafari Mekonnen on 18 November 1929, to deal with road extension. A traffic police was introduced, they were dressed up in European colonial style khakis, but were barefoot. The Emperor's private printing press, the Berhanena Salam Printing Press was formally opened in December 1929. Modernization in the fields of public health and education led to the erection of a number of schools and hospitals, including a school dedicated for freed slaves founded by Tafari Makonnen in 1927.

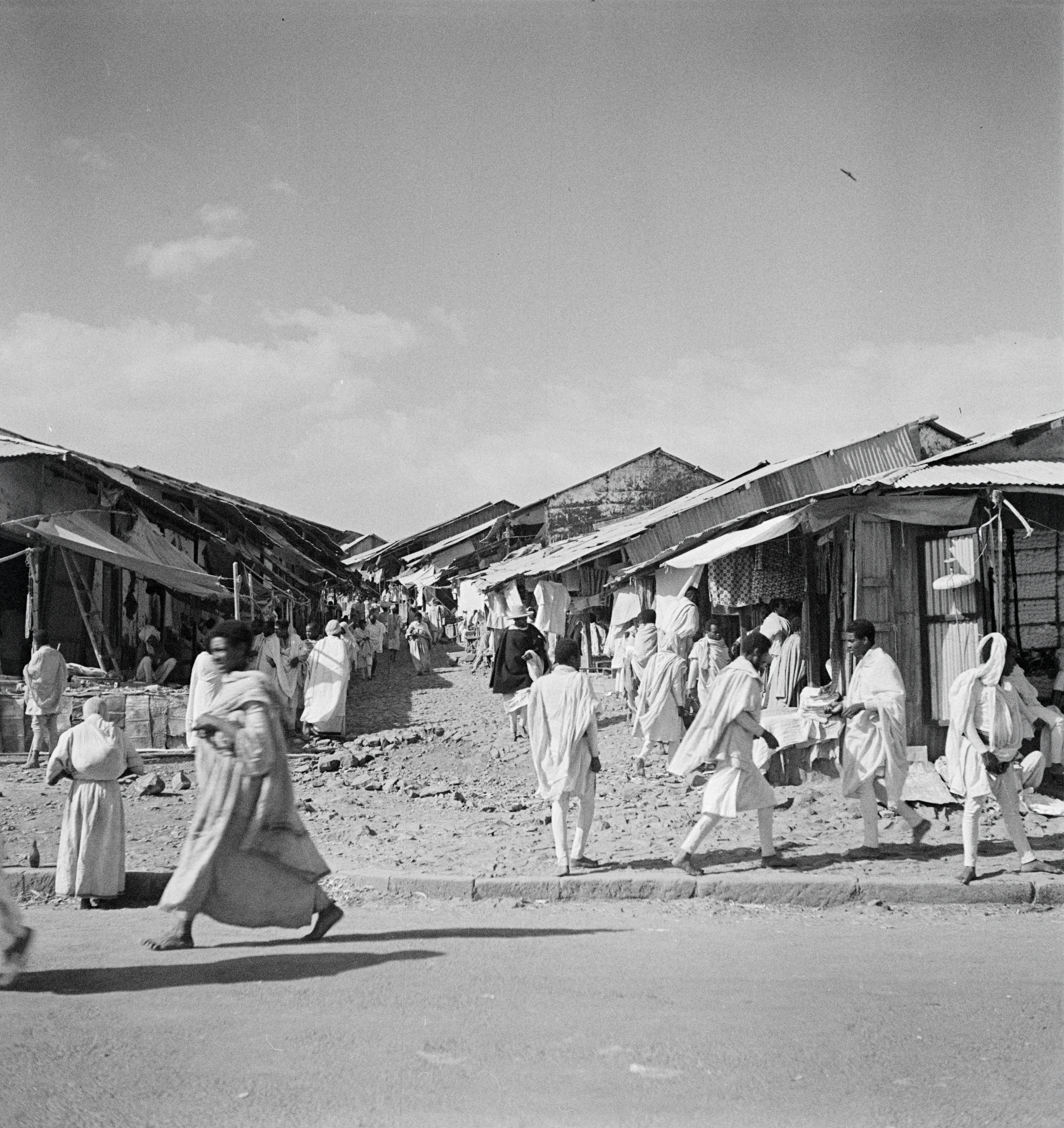

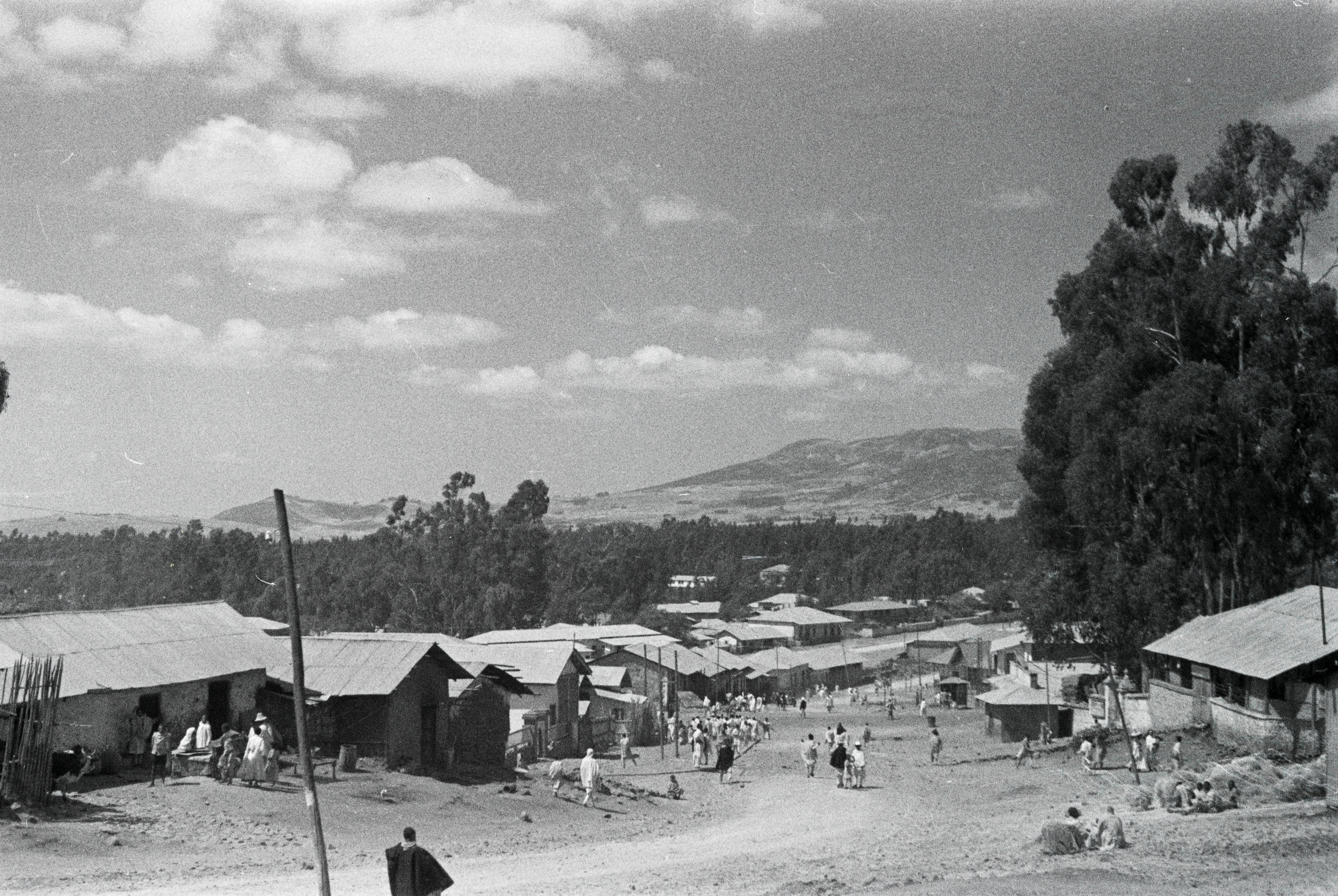
Addis Ababa marketplace scene circa February 1934

After crowned as Emperor, Haile Selassie issued with propelling further development of infrastructures such as importing power lines and telephone, and erecting several monuments, including one dedicated to Menelik II. A couple of cinemas came into existence, while Ras Haylu established a nightclub on Addis Alam road. Prior to the Italian invasion in 1935, the population of Addis Ababa was estimated to be between 100,000 and 200,000 inhabitants, including 6,000 foreigners, mainly Arabs, Greeks, Armenians and some British, French, Italians and Americans.

=== Italian occupation (1936–1941) ===
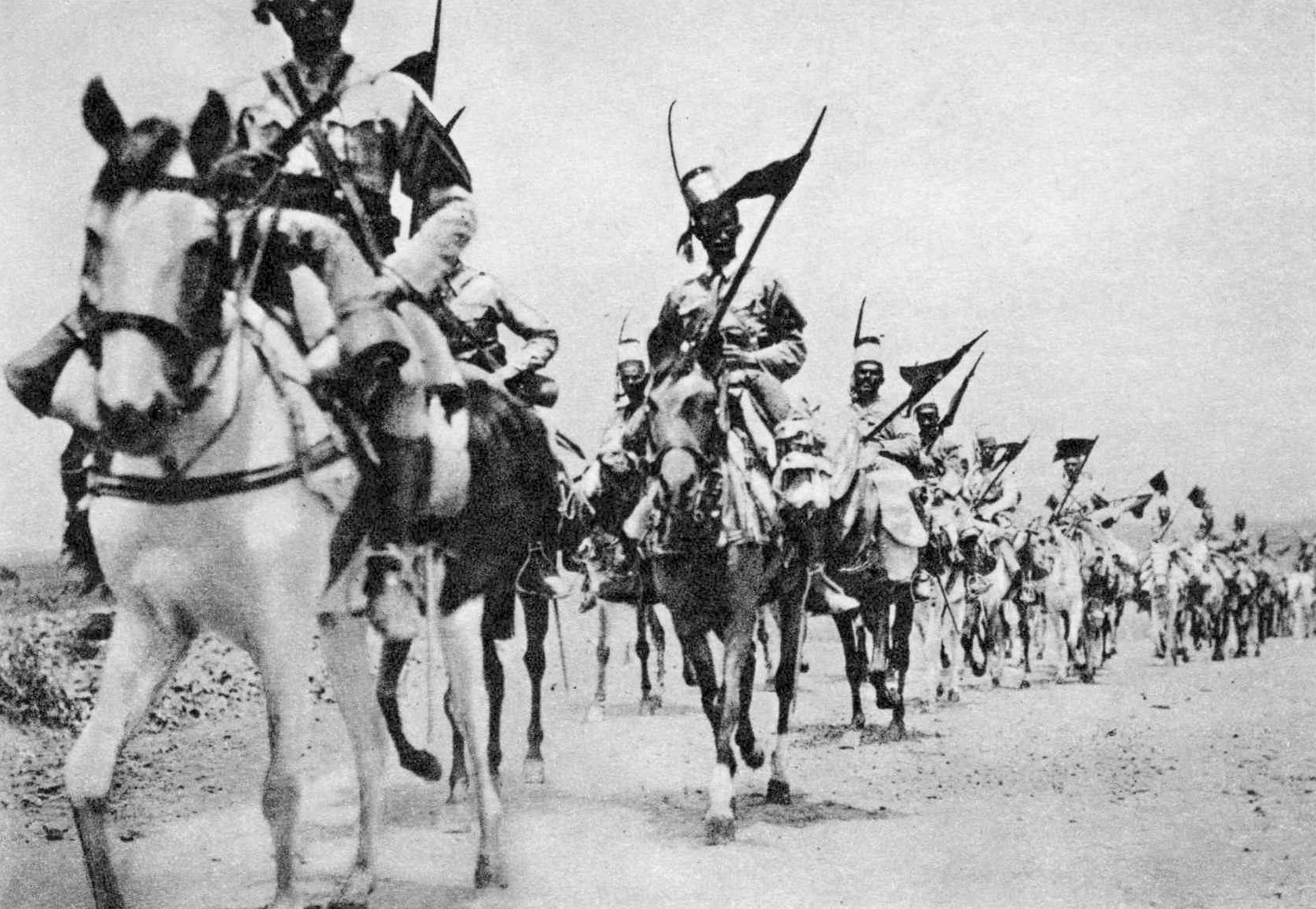
The Italian cavalry advancing to Addis Ababa following Second Italo-Ethiopian War in 1936

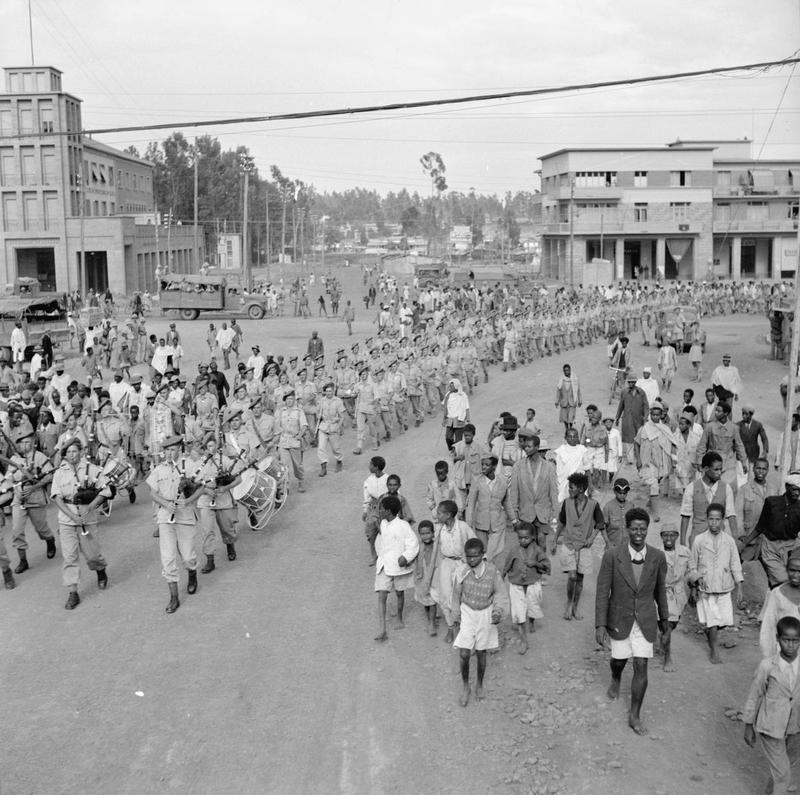
British troops marching through Addis Ababa in East African Campaign of Second World War

On 5 May 1936, Italian troops occupied Addis Ababa during the Second Italo-Abyssinian War, making it the capital of Italian East Africa. Addis Ababa was governed by the Italian Governors of Addis Ababa from 1936 to 1941. In those five years the Italian government made many improvements to the city, from the construction of hospitals and roads to the creation of stadiums like the Addis Ababa Stadium. The war of aggression resulted heavy aerial bombardment of the city, and along with future chartered Dire Dawa; the use of chemical weapons such as mustard gas constituted the Italian atrocities. The most lethal chemical weapons include sulphur mustards and spray tanks; the former could be the worst to sabotage the Ethiopian armies. According to the Soviet estimates, 15,000 Ethiopians casualties were victim of chemical weapons. Throughout their occupation, trade routes increasingly became spatial growth; in the last quarter of the century, Addis Ababa experienced profound road and trade route; opening the pavement to Adama and the Ethio-Djibouti trade corridor to the north of Ethiopian cities, Moyale with Kenyan territories to the southwest, and trade route with Sudan to the west. The Italian ambition was to make Addis Ababa the new beautified capital city and launched competitive master plan gathered by architects Marcello Piacentini, Alessandro Bianchi, Enrico Del Debbio, Giuseppe Vaccaro, Le Corbusier, Ignazio Guidi and Cesare Valle. Despite contradictory and different ideas from each individual, the plan expected to focus more general architectural plan of the city. In the preparation, two plans were approved; the Le Corbusier and Guidi and Valle. During meeting Mussolini, the French Swiss architect prepared guideline sketch that demonstrates monumental structure traversed by grand boulevard across the city from north to south, extracted from his Radiant City concept from 1930 to 1933. His theory likely approaching urbanization and placement of colonial military headquarter in front of traffic square.

The Guildi and Valle's master plan prepared in the summer 1936 more emphasized the fascist ideology and their monumental icons, with no native Ethiopian involvement of the designing sector. With two parallel axis, European charactered designed to connect Arada area/Giyorgis to the railway station in the south end, five kilometers long with varying width between 40 and 90 meters.

After the Italian army in Ethiopia was defeated by the British army (with the help of Arbegnoch (Note: Equivalent to Ethiopian patriots.)), during the liberation of Ethiopia in the Second World War, Emperor Haile Selassie returned to Addis Ababa on 5 May 1941—five years to the very day after he had departed—and immediately began the work of re-establishing his capital. It was abandoned in favor of Amba Alagi and other redoubts during the war.

=== Post-Italian occupation (1941–1974) ===
In aftermath, Addis Ababa suffered from transient economic recession and rapid population growth that was initiated by the Italian occupation; the inner-city borne urban morphology whereas the peripheral area sprawling urbanization. In 1946, Haile Selassie invited famous British master plan designer Sir Patrick Abercrombie, who want to beautify the city and role model for Africa. Abercrombie started organizing module with neighborhood units surrounded by green parkways. He draw beltway as a special feature for the plan characterized by radial shapes intended to channel the traffic away from central area, kept to green belts. Abercrombie achieved a careful plan of major traffic route, by separating neighborhood units, and taken from his solution for London traffic problem in 1943.

The outer ring road lying to streams of Kebena, one passing through Awash Winery, thus making organic nature of the neighborhood unit He also proposed satellite settlements around in Addis Ababa, which were designated for service center (for school, health centers, etc.). Abercrombie developed monumental feature and grid system that was prevailed during the Italian occupation, which seemingly contradicted the Italian master plan in particular areas such as Addis Ketema and Mercato.

In 1959, British consultant team Bolton Hennessy and Partners commissioned an improvement of Abercrombie's 1954–56 master plan regarding satellite towns. Places like Mekenissa and West of the old Air Port areas were not incorporated to the proposal, and Rapi, Gefersa, Kaliti and Kotebe proposed as outlet of Jimma, Ambo, Mojo, and Dessie respectively (the four regional highways). The plan of Hennessy and Partners illustrated metropolitan development surrounded by satellite towns that was larger than the current size of Addis Ababa physically.

In 1965, the French Mission for Urban Studies and Habitat led by Luis De Marien's prepared master plan for the city responsible for creation of monumental axis passing through Addis Ababa City Hall through railway station extending to Gofa Mazoria in the southern part of the city. The difference between Lius De Marien's plan with the Italians was the Italians used double monumental axis, while Marien used the single monumental axis. Through visual links by connecting the Addis Ababa City Hall and the railway station in the south, it gave impression to Champs-Élysées in Paris that extended from Louvre area to La Defense district of the city.

Haile Selassie helped form the Organization of African Unity in 1963, and invited the new organization to keep its headquarters in the city. The OAU was dissolved in 2002 and replaced by the African Union (AU), also headquartered in Addis Ababa. The United Nations Economic Commission for Africa also has its headquarters in Addis Ababa. Addis Ababa was also the site of the Council of the Oriental Orthodox Churches in 1965. According to Pankhurst (1962) survey, 212 square kilometers, 58% of total land were owned by 1,768 persons, owing to 10,000 square meters. 12% of area were given for churches. Some areas still posthumously entitled by members of various nobilities of that time: such as Dejazemach Wube Haile Mariam, Fitawrari Aba Koran, and a bridge named "Fitawrari Habtegiorgis" after Habte Giyorgis Dinagde. According to the 1965 master plan, the city covered an area of 21,000 hectares and would increase to 51,000 hectares by 1984 master plan. The city had only 10 woredas.

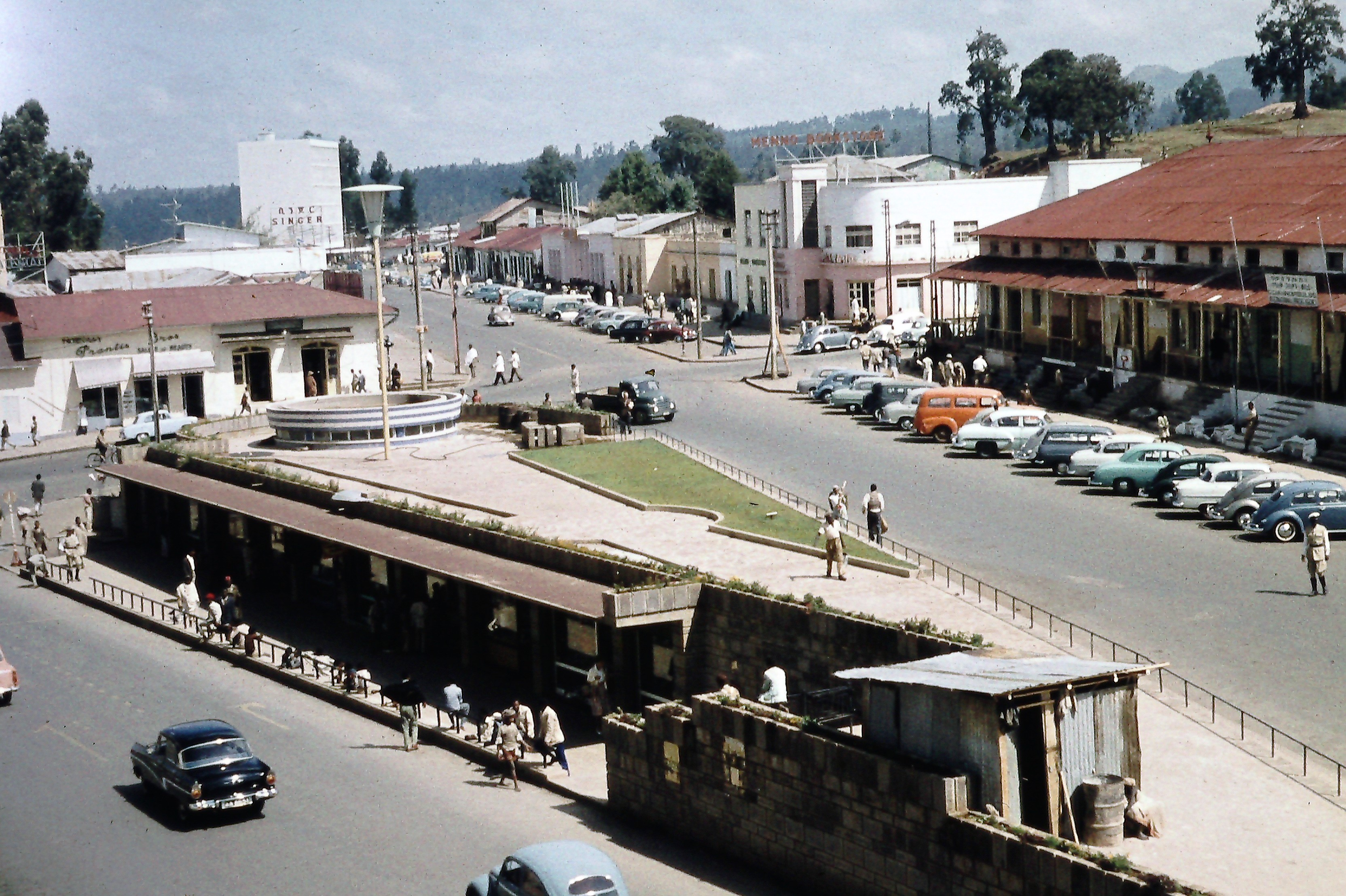
Piazza in Addis Ababa, 1960

The Haile Selassie regime faced backlash—as evident by a 1960 coup d'état attempt—from various reactionary partisans. In 1965, Haile Selassie I University, later Addis Ababa University, students marched chanting "Land to the Tiller" as a response of the imperial feudal system, culminating in a series of revolutionary protests across Addis Ababa, and ushering Marxist–Leninist momentum. In addition, the 1973 oil crisis heavily impacted the city. 1,500 peasants in Addis Ababa marched to plead for food to be returned by police, and intellectual from Addis Ababa University forced the government to take a measure against the spreading famine, a report which Haile Selassie government denounced as "fabrication". Haile Selassie responded later "rich and poor have always existed and will, Why? Because there are those that work...and those that prefer to do nothing...Each individual is responsible for his misfortunes, his fate." Students around the city gathered to protest in February 1974, eventually Haile Selassie successfully deposed from office in 1974 by group of police officers. Later, the group named themselves Derg, officially "Provisional Military Administrative Council" (PMAC).

=== The Derg administration (1974—1991) ===
After overthrow of Emperor Haile Selassie by communist Derg in 1974, roughly two-third of the housing stock transferred to rental housing. In 1975, the Derg nationalized all "extra" rental structures built by private stockholders. If those rental properties value less than 100 birr (48.31 USD), they would be put under kebele administration.

Under Proclamation No 47/1975, small building owed to kebele units, whereas large quality rental houses to Agency for Rental Housing Administration (ARHA). However, it was not successful at all; informal constructions, and renewal, or expansion extended to inner-city. In addition, nationalized lands underwent poor management as a result of low tenancy that cannot be overhaul.

The first plan developed during the Derg era was from Hungarian planner C.K. Polonyi, with assistance of Ministry of Urban Development and Housing. His major proposal classified into two: the first was an integration of Addis Ababa with suburbs of rural areas, and the second was the development of inner-city; residential layout for self-help housing projects. Polonyi also worked to redesign Meskel Square which was named by the time Abiyot Square, and implemented immediately through the name change. The square was subjected to major development during the Derg regime by linkage to Arada railway station. Polonyi planned Addis Ababa to become megacity through connection with neighbor town, Adama. It was intended for creating agricultural conglomeration from south-east.

In 1986, a master plan was created by 45 Ethiopian professionals and 75 Italian experts. In preparation, 237 sectorial reports were documented as references, with a concept of developing balanced urban system and integrating to surrounding regions and metropolitan areas. It also prepared whether to identify the city service such as water supply and other urban-related service available to the area. From the envisioned map, Akaki should be incorporated to Addis Ababa to supply industrial and freight terminal services. The 1986 Italo-Ethiopian master plan despite extensively projected, delayed for eight years due to the bureaucratic system of the Derg government, and finally approved in 1994. The suspension caused fragmentation of services and public areas and affected unplanned development that intended for structure the urban form of the city.

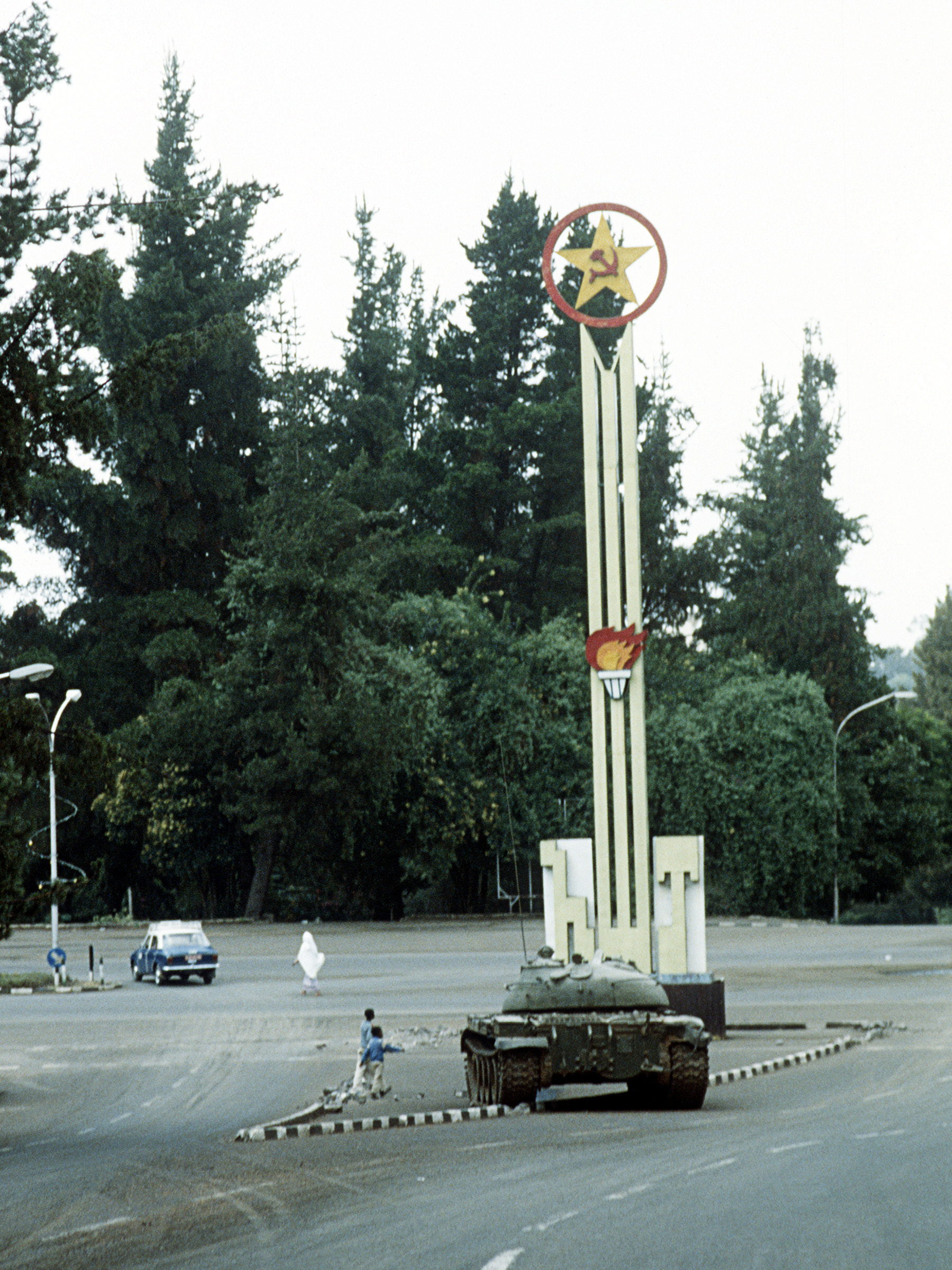
Tank in street of Addis Ababa shortly after the seizure of Ethiopian People's Revolutionary Democratic Front (EPRDF) from the Derg in 1991

On 28 May 1991, the Ethiopian People's Revolutionary Democratic Front (EPRDF) coalition party in course of overthrowing the Derg government, seized Addis Ababa. According to witness, resident were not terrorized by the event and a militant remarked "We think it's safe now". They engulfed the central place of city such as Hilton Hotel, displaying a banner read as "Peace, Solidarity, Friendship". At 5:30 am, they completely controlled the presidential area and large-scale tanks were seen overrun.

=== Federal Democratic Republic (1991–present) ===
During the EPRDF transitional government first three years, Addis Ababa's urban growth was slowed down. Housing allotment continued for two years and replaced by real estate that allows to individual ownership. A new constitution was adapted in 1994 and enacted a year later: while all cities in Ethiopia administrated by regional authority, only Addis Ababa (Proclamation No 87/1997) and Dire Dawa (Proclamation No 416/2004) remain chartered cities, mandates for self-governing and developmental center.

== 21st-century ==
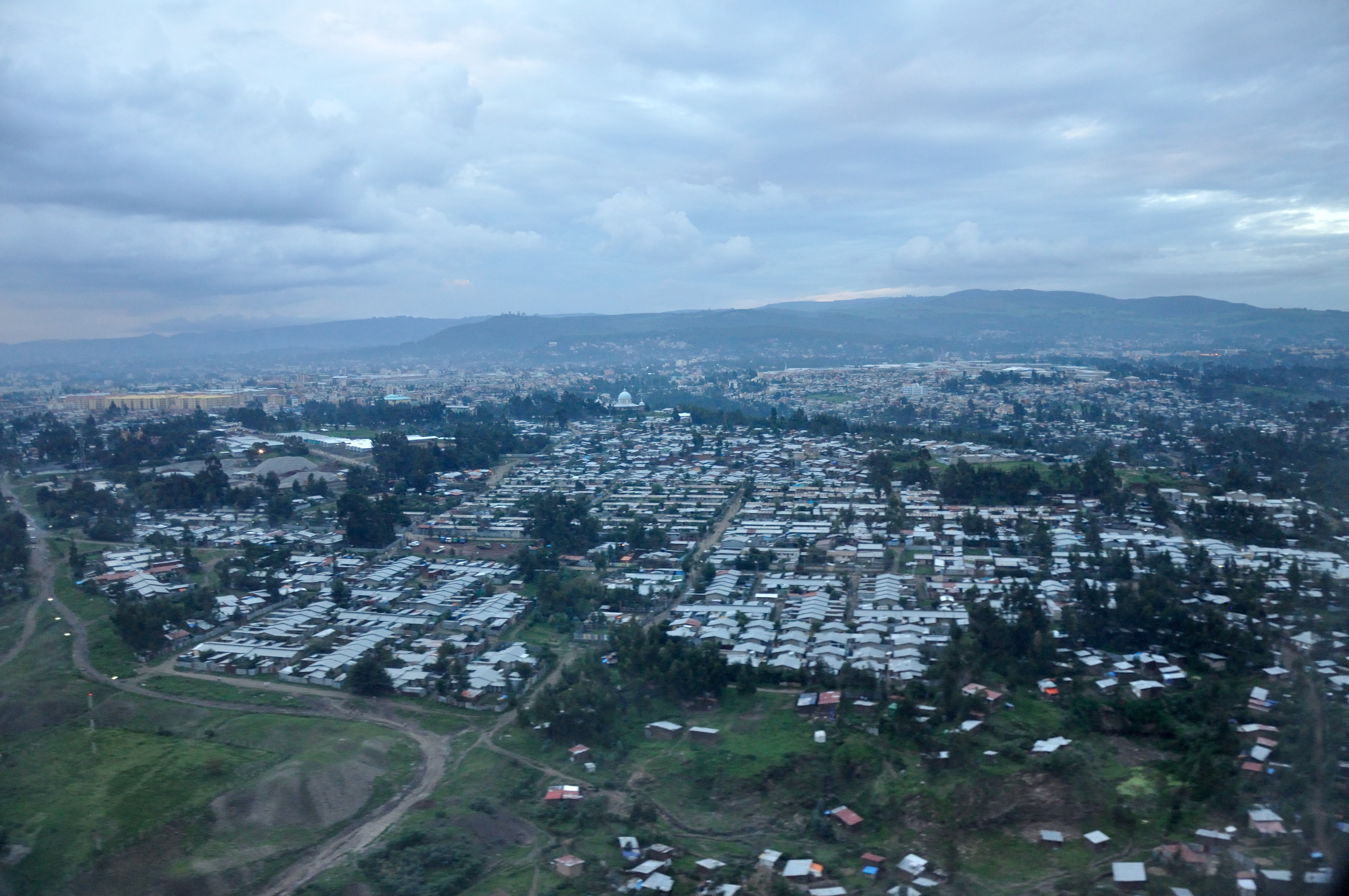
Addis Ababa landscape taken on 27 August 2009

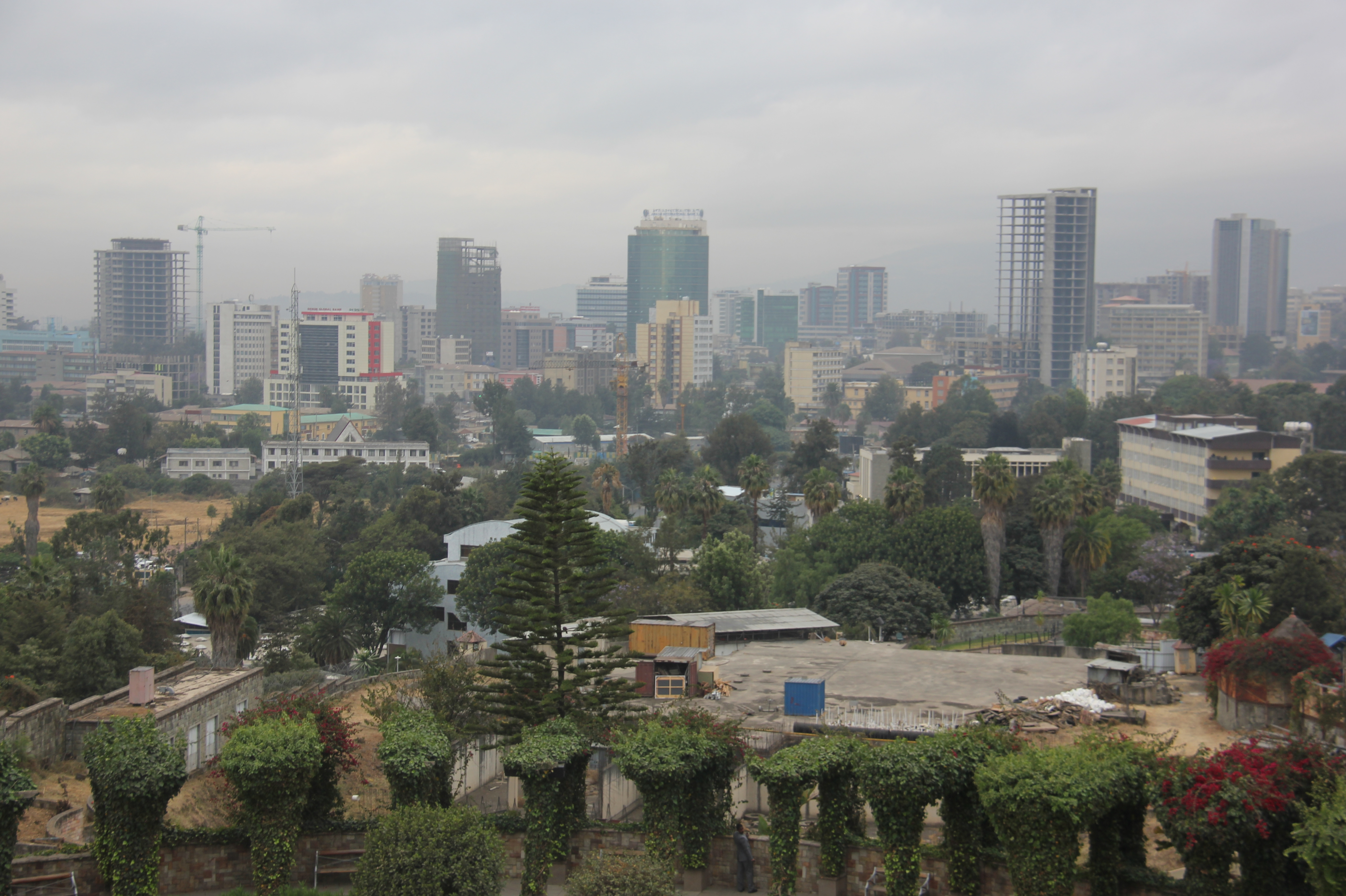
Addis Ababa in 2015

By the end of 1998, a new project was launched by Addis Ababa City Administration and named as Office for Revision of Addis Ababa Master Plan (ORAAMP) and new master plan was set up named Revised Addis Ababa Master Plan that covered from 1999 to 2003. The main reason of the project was to develop market economy and instigate improvement of political system. The plan was similar to the revisited plan of 1986 in terms of urban area.

=== 2014 Addis Ababa Master Plan ===
A master plan for Addis Ababa boundary expansion with 1.1 million hectares into the Oromia special zone sparked violent crackdowns and Oromo-led protests since 25 April 2014. After deadly protests were conducted that led to numerous casualties in Addis Ababa and Ginchi town, the controversial plan finally cancelled on 12 January 2016. By that time, 140 protestors were killed.

United Nations Population Projections estimated metro area of Addis Ababa 5,228,000 in 2022, a 4.43% increase from 2021. During Abiy Ahmed's premiership, Addis Ababa and its vicinities underwent Beautifying Sheger. This project is aimed to enhance the green coverage and beauty of the city. In 2018, Abiy initiated a project called "Riverside" planned to expand riverbanks for 56 kilometres (35 mi), from the Entoto Mountains to the Akaki river.

== See also ==
- Timeline of Addis Ababa

== Bibliography ==
- Pankhurst, Richard (2001). The Ethiopians: A History (Peoples of Africa). Wiley-Blackwell; New Ed edition. ISBN 0-631-22493-9.
