= Million Mathewos =

Ethiopian politician

- ሚሊዮን ማቲዎስ

State Minister of Mines, Petroleum Development and Control
- Incumbent
- Assumed office 9 October 2021
- Appointed by: Abiy Ahmed
- President: Sahle-Work Zewde; Taye Atske Selassie
- Prime Minister: Abiy Ahmed

State Minister of Education
- In office 9 November 2019 – 6 October 2021
- President: Sahle-Work Zewde
- Prime Minister: Abiy Ahmed

President of the Southern Nations, Nationalities, and Peoples' Region
- In office 24 July 2018 – 31 August 2019
- President: Mulatu Teshome; Sahle-Work Zewde
- Prime Minister: Abiy Ahmed
- Preceded by: Dessie Dalke
- Succeeded by: Erstu Yirdaw

Personal details
- Party: Southern Ethiopian People's Democratic Movement (until 2019)
- Other political affiliations: Ethiopian People's Revolutionary Democratic Front

Million Mathewos (Amharic: ሚሊዮን ማቲዎስ) is an Ethiopian politician who has been the State Minister of Mines, Petroleum Development and Control since 2021. Previously, he had served with state Minister of Education from 2019 to 2021.

A member of the Southern Ethiopian People's Democratic Movement (SEPDM), Million was the president of Southern Nations, Nationalities, and People's Region (SNNPR) from 2018 to 2019.

== Political career ==
On 24 July 2018, Million Methewos has been elected by 7th regular congress as the president of the Southern Nations, Nationalities, and People's Region (SNNPR), replacing Dessie Dalke. In October 2018, the Southern Ethiopian People's Democratic Movement (SEPDM) elected 65 members of the central committee and alongside Muferiat Kamil, Million was the elected CC members.

On 9 November 2019, Million was the State Minister of Education. On 9 October 2021, Million was elected by Prime Minister Abiy Ahmed as State Minister of Mines, Petroleum Development and Control.
