= Sebhat Nega =

Ethiopian politician (born 1935)

Aboy Sebhat Nega
- Born: 1935 (age 90–91); Adwa, Tigray Province, Italian Ethiopia
- Education: Nigist Saba School (Adwa)
- Alma mater: Addis Ababa University
- Political party: Tigray People's Liberation Front
- Other political affiliations: Ethiopian People's Revolutionary Democratic Front
- Awards: Honorary Doctorate Degree in Leadership and Politics (2016)

Aboy Sebhat Nega (Tigrinya: ኣቦይ ስብሓት ነጋ; born 1935) is an Ethiopian politician and senior member of the Tigray People's Liberation Front (TPLF).

Born in Adwa, Sebhat joined TPLF in 1976 to fight the Derg regime. After the Derg fell in 1991, he became the head of the EPRDF’s Economic Affairs Department, which oversees the Endowment Fund for the Rehabilitation of Tigray (EFFORT), a group of TPLF-affiliated companies. He has served in Meles Zenawi cabinet and prominent of TPLF classic ideologies.

During the Tigray War, Sebhat was one of surviving TPLF officials that have been captured by the Ethiopian government force in his hideout Kola Tembien area in the northern Tigray Region. In January 2022, he was pardoned by Prime Minister Abiy Ahmed in the course of talks with the US special envoy to the Horn of Africa, Jeffry Feltman.

== Biography ==
Sebhat Nega was born in 1935 in Adwa to Tigrayan and Eritrean parents. He is called "Aboy" affectionately meaning "father". In 1997 interview, he recalled moving around with his father who was the governor of Zana district in Tigray during the Italian invasion of Ethiopia.

In 1970s, before he cofounded the Tigray People's Liberation Front (TPLF), Sebhat was graduated in economics, worked for the Finance Ministry, and then as a teacher. After TPLF overthrew the Derg in 1991, he became the head of the EPRDF’s Economic Affairs Department, which oversees the Endowment Fund for the Rehabilitation of Tigray (EFFORT), a group of TPLF-affiliated companies. For much of decade, Sebhat served as the chief executive officer of EFFORT and loyalist to Meles Zenawi government. While TPLF advocated for Marxist-Leninist idea, Sebhat was the only person who adheres classical TPLF ideologies. In 2008, WikiLeaks released document by U.S diplomatic cables of Sebhat quote, saying "Ethiopia will disintegrate in the absence of the TPLF’s Revolutionary Democracy." Sebhat continued to dismantle controversial statements after Meles' death in 2012, saying Ethiopians were not ready for democracy and that the EPRDF had been focused on cleansing the state of the remnants of previous national socialist and feudal regimes.

During the Tigray War, Sebhat has been captured by the government force operation in his hideout in the rugged Kola Tembien area in the northern Tigray Region. On 21 January 2022, Sebhat was released from prison after US special envoy to the Horn of Africa, Jeffry Feltman made visit to Addis Ababa for peaceful talk.

== Awards and honors ==
In July 2016, Axum University awarded Sibhat an Honorary Doctorate Degree in Leadership and Politics.
