= Habtamu Tegegne =

Ethiopian politician

- ሀብታሙ ተገኜ

Minister of Mines and Petroleum
- Incumbent
- Assumed office 20 January 2023
- President: Sahle-Work Zewde
- Prime Minister: Abiy Ahmed
- Preceded by: Takele Uma Banti

Director General of the Ethiopian Roads Authority
- In office August 2016 – 20 January 2023
- President: Mulatu Teshome; Sahle-Work Zewde
- Prime Minister: Hailemariam Desalegn; Abiy Ahmed

Personal details
- Party: Prosperity Party

Habtamu Tegegne (Amharic: ሀብታሙ ተገኜ) is an Ethiopian politician who is serving as the Minister of Mines and Petroleum since 20 January 2023. After serving as a member of the House of Peoples' Representatives (HoPR), he succeeded Takele Uma Banti, who served the ministry from 18 August 2020. He is a member of Prosperity Party.

Previously, Habtamu worked as Director General of the Ethiopian Roads Authority since August 2016.
