= Lemi National Cement Factory =

Ethiopian cement factory

- Operated: 28 September 2024
- Location: Lemi Building Materials Industrial Park, near Lemi, Ethiopia (Amhara Region)
- Coordinates: 9.930°N 38.954°E
- Industry: Cement
- Area: 270 ha (670 acres)
- Volume: 15,000tpd
- Owners: East African Holding Co; West International Holding
- Website: leminationalcementplc.com

Lemi National Cement Factory is a cement factory in Lemi Building Materials Industrial Park, about 150 km north of Addis Ababa, Ethiopia. Inaugurated on 28 September 2024, it is the largest cement factory in Ethiopia with a production capacity of 150,000 quintals (15,000 tonnes). It was built by a joint venture of the West International Holding, the African arm of West China Cement, in partnership with East African Holding Company with $600 million cost.

== History ==
Lemi National Cement Factory was inaugurated by Prime Minister Abiy Ahmed with other high-ranking officials on 28 September 2024. In November 2023, the factory reported of 70% completion. It is the largest cement factory in Ethiopia with production capacity of 150,000 quintals (15,000 tonnes). Built by the West International Holding, the African arm of West China Cement, in partnership with East African Holding Company, the factory achieved major milestone in the Ethiopian manufacturing sector with joint venture of $2.2 million.

Lemi National Cement reportedly cost about $600 million, located in Lemi Building Materials Industrial Park, about 150 km north of Addis Ababa. Speaking on the inauguration, Abiy highlighted "as we inaugurate, with a production capacity of 150,000 quintals per day, this mega project stands as a testament to our government’s commitment to building fast, building big, and building clean".

== See also ==
- List of cement manufacturers in Ethiopia
