= Diriba Kuma =

Ethiopian diplomat

Deriba Kuma
- Deribaa Kumaa

Ambassador of Ethiopia to Sweden and other Nordic countries
- Incumbent
- Assumed office 29 March 2019
- Appointed by: Mulatu Teshome
- President: Sahle-Work Zewde; Taye Atske Selassie
- Prime Minister: Abiy Ahmed

30th Mayor of Addis Ababa
- In office 9 July 2013 – 16 July 2018
- President: Mulatu Teshome
- Prime Minister: Abiy Ahmed; Hailemariam Desalegn
- Preceded by: Kuma Demeksa
- Succeeded by: Takele Uma Benti

Minister of Transport
- In office October 2010 – July 2013
- Appointed by: Meles Zenawi
- President: Girma Wolde-Giorgis
- Prime Minister: Meles Zenawi
- Preceded by: Workneh Gebeyehu
- Succeeded by: Siraj Fegessa

Personal details
- Education: Addis Ababa University (BA)
- Occupation: Diplomat

Deriba Kuma (Oromo: Deribaa Kumaa; Amharic: ድሪባ ኩማ) is an Ethiopian diplomat who was the 30th Mayor of Addis Ababa, who took office on 9 July 2013 until 16 July 2018. Diriba served as Minister of Transport from October 2010 to July 2013 before being elected as Mayor of Addis Ababa. After his term as mayor, he was appointed as an ambassador to foreign countries by President Mulatu Teshome. Currently, he is an ambassador to Sweden as well as other Nordic countries since March 2019.
