= Mugher Cement Enterprise =

Ethiopian cement manufacturer

- Location within Ethiopia
- Built: 1984; 42 years ago
- Operated: 1984
- Location: Addis Ababa; Mugar River, Ethiopia
- Coordinates: 9.480°N 38.352°E
- Industry: Cement
- Products: Ordinary Portland cement Poslana Portland Cement
- Employees: 1,488
- Volume: 900,000 tons of cement per year
- Owner: Ethiopian government
- Website: www.mughercement.com.et

Mugher Cement Enterprise is an Ethiopian state-owned cement manufacturer located on the Mugher River, 920km west of Addis Ababa, Ethiopia. It was established during the Derg era in 1984 with annual capacity of 300,000 tons of clinker per annum.

Evolving to 600,000 capacity in 1990, Mugher Cement Enterprise is the largest cement manufacturer in Ethiopia.

== History ==
Mugher Cement Enterprise was constructed in 1984 and began operation in the same year. It produces with capacity of 300,000 tons of clinker per annum, near Mugher River, located 90 km west of Addis Ababa. In 1990, the company doubled its capacity to 600,000 tons per annum of clinker production, marked by the construction of second plant. In 2011, the third plant was commissioned.

On 22 December 2006, the company decided to increase its wholesale price by 25%, increasing with distribution rate of 135 birr and capital of 125 birr. Mugher Cement is the largest cement producer in Ethiopia with a production capacity of 900,000 tones and a 35% market share with total employees numbering 1,488. Mugher Cement Enterprise produces two main products: OPC (Ordinary Portland cement) and PPC (Poslana Portland Cement). Sulfate resistance cement also produced on-demand.

== See also ==
- List of cement manufacturers in Ethiopia
