= Transport in Addis Ababa =

Transport in Addis Ababa includes cars, buses and light rail. In several occasions, these services often foiled with structural problems that impacts urban mobility. Anbessa Bus, Higer Bus and Star Alliance Bus are popular buses in Addis Ababa. Besides, share taxis such as sedan and blue and white minibuses are typical mode of transportation still today, carrying up to 12 passengers.

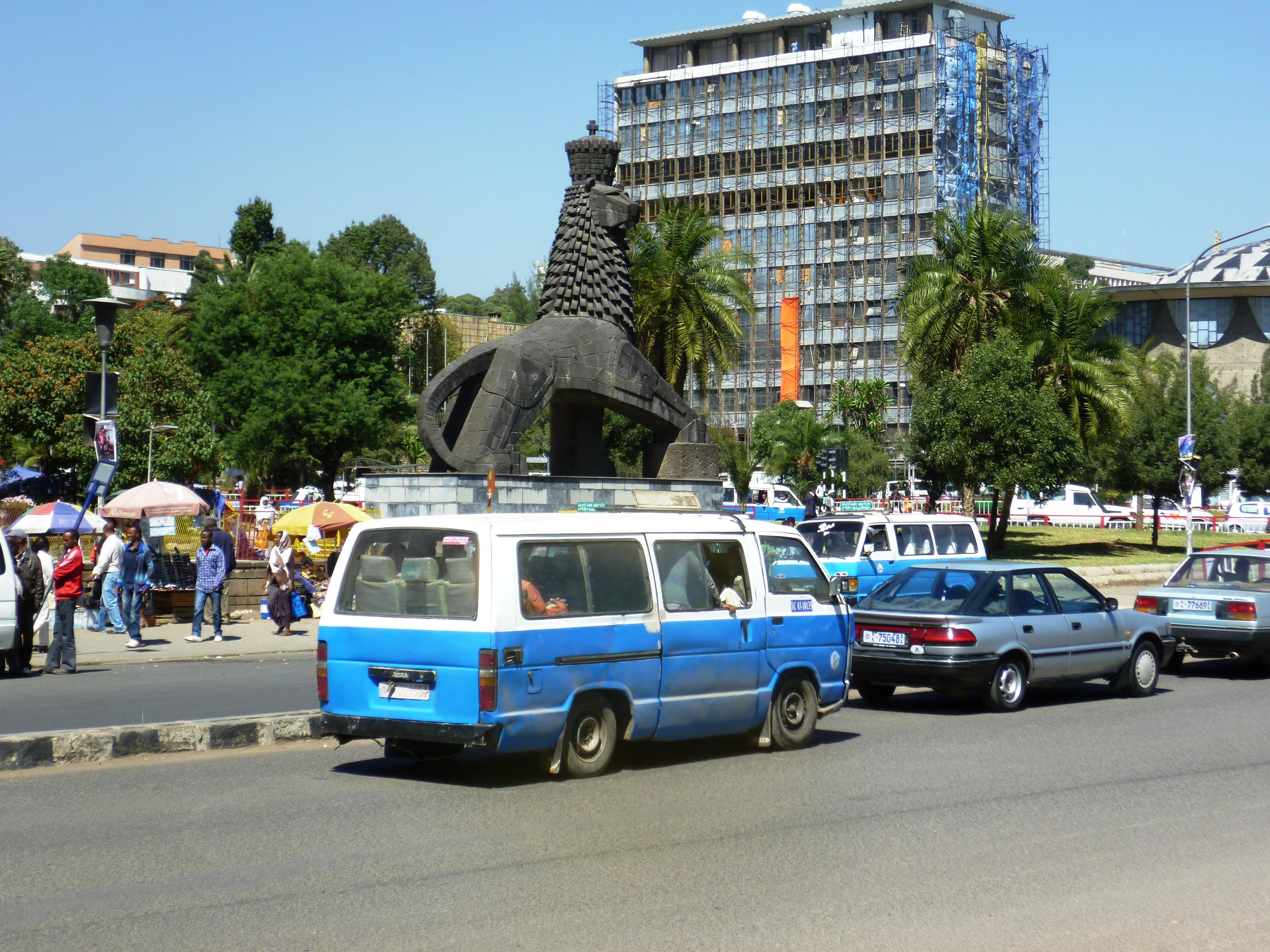
Blue and white minibus near Arat Kilo

To resolve unregulated anomaly, zoning taxi system was developed in 2008 by the Addis Ababa Road and Transport Bureau (AARTB) which forms taxi association. The system prevented any difficulties in traffic environments and congestion. Since 2014, RIDE taxi is operating to evolve into online door-to-door service.

== General outline ==
Taxi system in Addis Ababa believed began operation during Emperor Haile Selassie regime with smaller cars called Fiat 600.

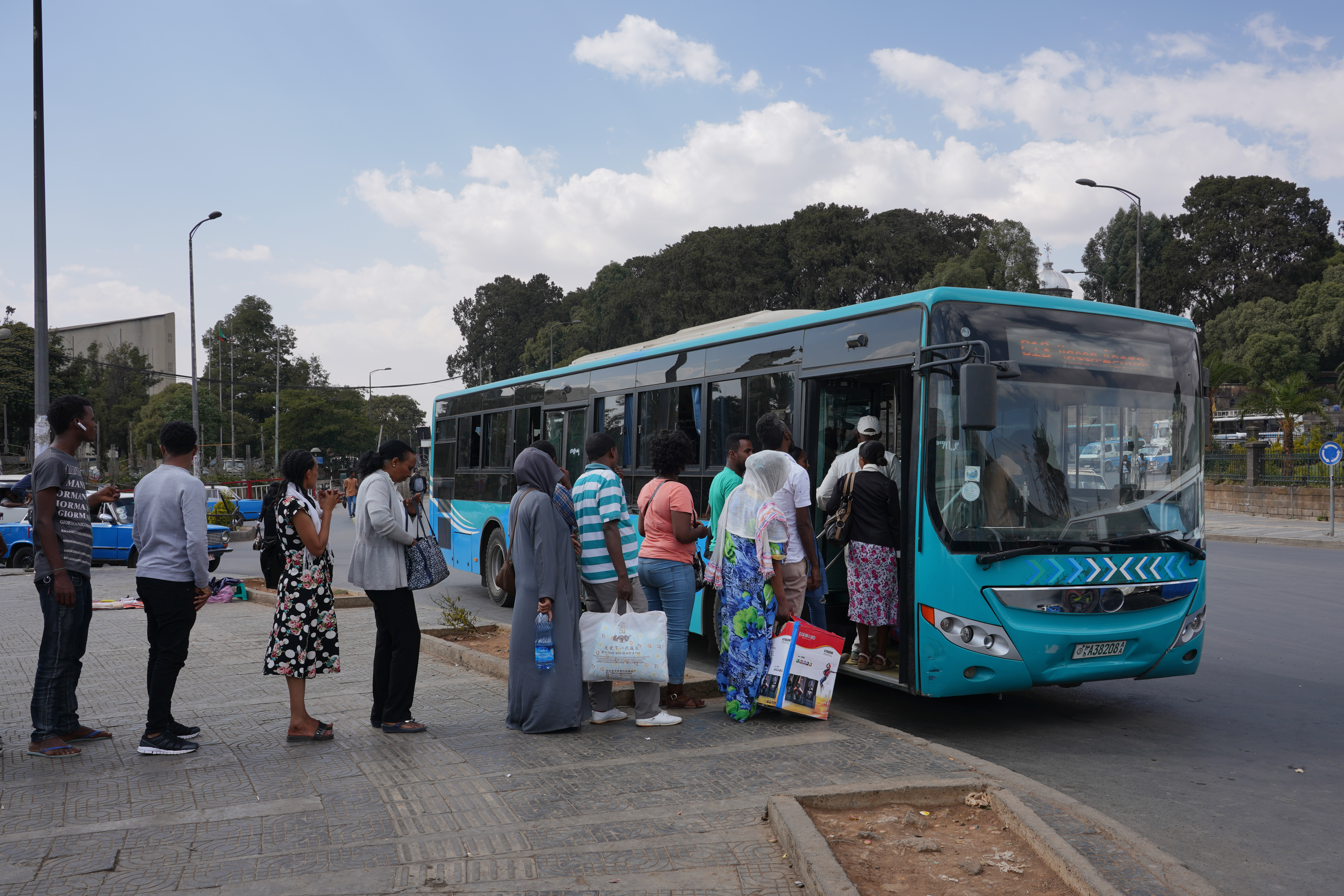
People in queue to enter a bus in 2018

Minibus taxi transport is one of the most widespread public transport options in Addis Ababa, which has greater modal capability. Public transportation modes include, Anbessa buses, minibus taxis, Star Alliance buses, Higer minibuses and saloon taxis. High capacity of bus consisted of nominal 100 passengers, and minibuses carry up to 12 passengers. Anbessa had operated 530 buses. According to the Ethiopian Road Transport Authority, buses provide 40% and taxis 60% of public transport as of 2005.

Public often suffered from inconveniences, and extra cost to their destinations that impact on urban mobility. Transportation affected through various factors, including climatic and environmental, infrastructural, and architectural classifications. Pedestrian often walking improperly to road networks, resulting inefficiency and impacts necessity of urbanization and urban sprawl in terms of mobility.

Modified taxis operating in Addis Ababa range to 7,500, although recently sedan taxis used to serve in contract despite representing small portion of all modes. Fares differ from each place and taxi type. For example, buses charges flat fare for each route with variations on route basis and minibuses fare related to trip length, causing fare rate anomalies resulted from incommensurable with kilometer band limits.

Although in 1992 the public transport held strategy focusing in taxi sector, the marketing service still lacked proper regulation.

== Zonal transportation ==
Zoning system first developed by the Derg government in 1980s. In 2008, it was reintroduced by the Addis Ababa Road and Transport Bureau (AARTB) without formal implementation until 10 May 2011.

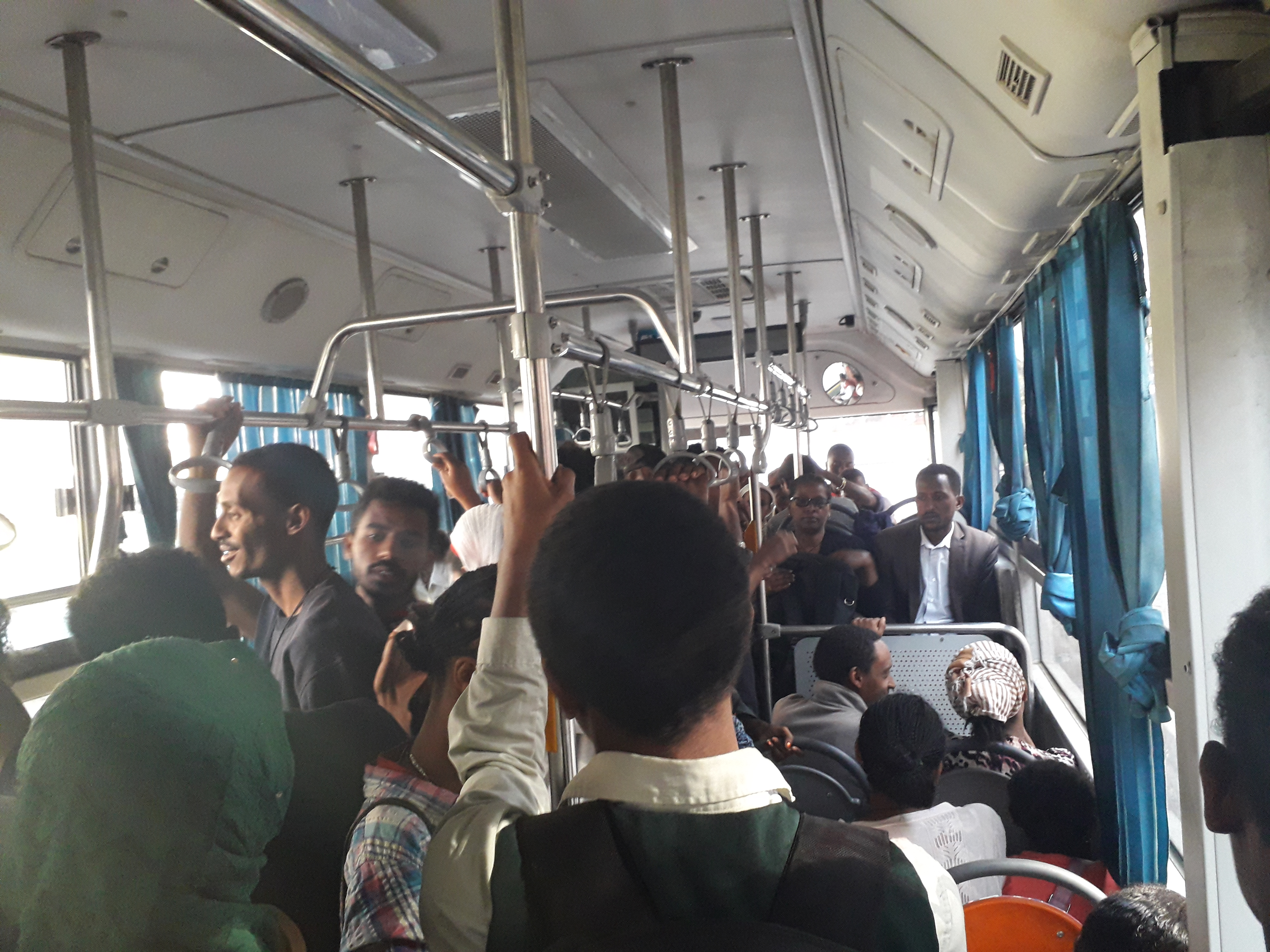
Passengers cramming inside a bus

Until 2011, the transportation system was almost unregulated by the government by which taxis operated through every routes in desired areas to gain profit, and discrimination was visible in taxi service lacked peripheral areas of Addis Ababa. The government then introduced zonal taxi transport system with special reference to Addis Ababa. In this service, taxi attendants in every stations were only legalized and taxi owners form taxi association (with exception of some vehicle belonging to any association), a zoning transportation system which every vehicles serve passengers to specific destinations via roof signboard. This prevents monopolistic scenarios. However, the regulation did not bring effect with regard to time spent; comparing to the previous zonal system, it had experienced unsatisfactory environment for taxi terminals, the unresponsiveness of transportation bureau toward the problem and theft and traffic congestion.

As of 2013, 239 routes are categorized into five zones including Bole, Megenagna, Asco, Saris and Tor Hailoch. 13 taxi owner associations were identified by Transport Bureau to zoning system to improve urban transport situation.

== Modes ==
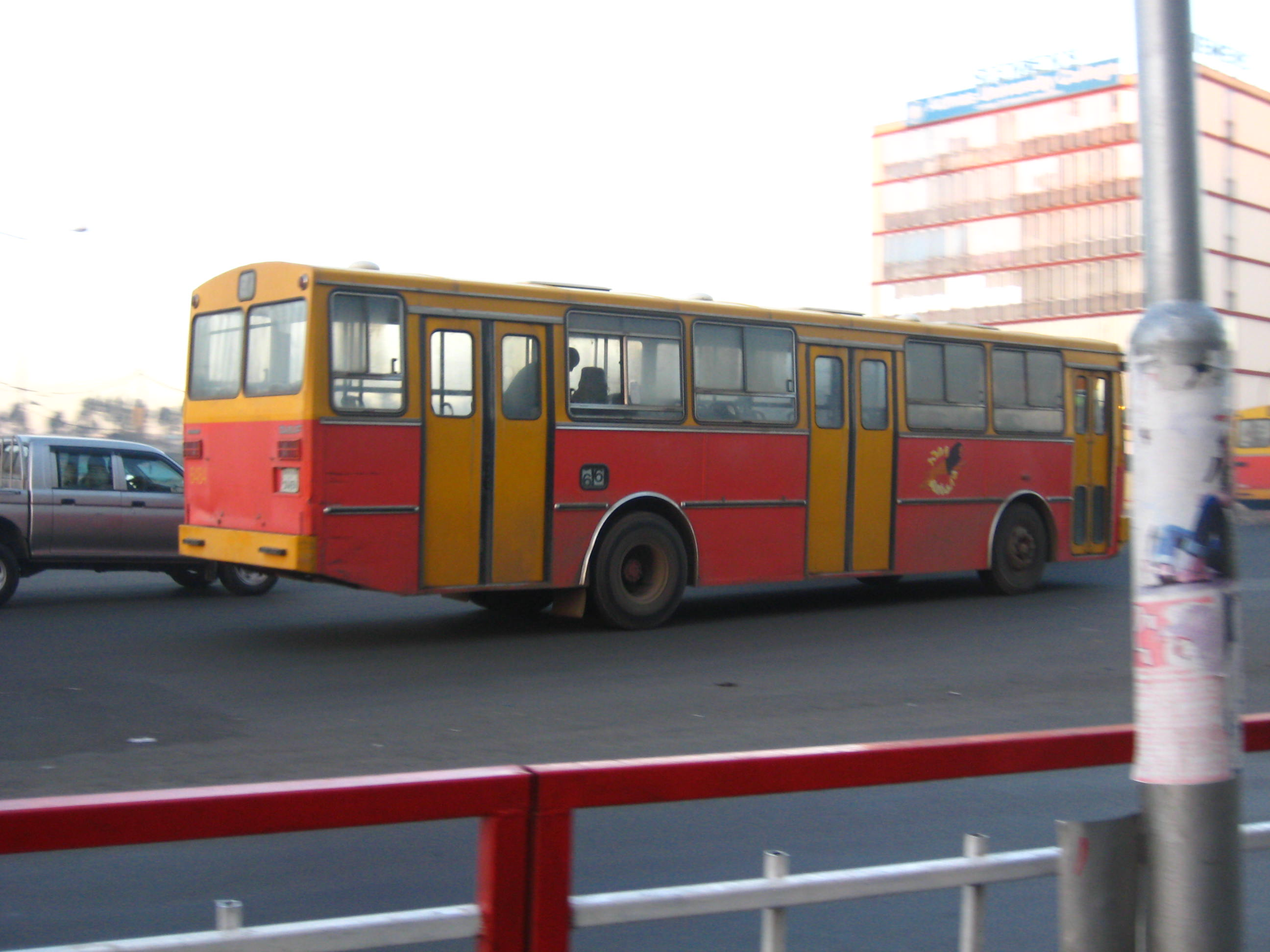
Anbessa Bus with DAF chassis in 2008

The blue and white minibus taxi has been dominant mode of transport. Anbessa bus, which started in 1945, has 800 buses that transports 1.2 million people daily, where Star Alliance that began 2009 had 25,000 people per day with 25 buses. Totally, the bureau estimates around 500 minibuses carrying 700,000 commuters. The Addis Ababa Road and Transport Bureau (AARTB) identified 22,089 blue and white that operate either full time or part-time, 7,050 whom has Code-3 plate number. These Code-3 number plate reintroduced after suspension of taxi business on 18 January 2010, when Higer bus thought to serve on behalf of it for meantime.

In 2007, the Ethiopian government announced to import 1,000 Higer buses from China in response of transport shortage. The plan was to sell the buses to individuals through loan provided by Commercial Bank of Ethiopia, placing the buses as collateral. The Anbessa City Bus procured 25-seater buses at the cost of 13.2 million dollars from Higer Bus Company Ltd. Since then, Higer bus became major public transport while 12-seat minibus and 22–27 seater confronted public demand for transportation.

In December 2014, under project of Addis Ababa-based software company Hybrid System, RIDE taxi service was launched by CEO Samrawit Fikru with SMS-based. She started with capital less than $2,000 and over 90 of staff employees were women. In 2017, Hybrid Design launched the first application platform to provide door-to-door service. Clients can simply invoke the service by dialing 8294.
