= Ministry of Mines and Petroleum (Ethiopia) =

Government ministry of Ethiopia

- የማዕድንና ነዳጅ ሚኒስቴር

Agency overview
- Formed: 18 April 2018
- Headquarters: Mariam Road, Addis Ababa, Ethiopia; 9.024447507942675°N 38.82528295396782°E
- Agency executives: Habtamu Tegegne, Director-General; Million Mathewos, State Minister
- Website: Official website

The Ministry of Mines and Petroleum (Amharic: የማዕድንና ነዳጅ ሚኒስቴር) is the Ethiopian government department responsible for management of mining and petroleum sector in Ethiopia. It was established in 2018 under Proclamation No 1097/2018 and Melese Alemu served as the first Minister of the position. In 2020, Takele Uma Banti succeeded as the Minister of Mines and Petroleum until 14 January 2023. Currently, Habtamu Tegene has been the current minister since 20 January 2023. It was previously known as the Ministry of Mines and Energy.

== History ==
The Ministry of Mines and Petroleum was established in 2018 under Proclamation No.1097/2018 as a regulatory organ of the Mines and Petroleum Sector of the country. by Melese Alemu served as the first Minister of Mining and Petroleum on 18 April 2018. In August 2019, the Ministry launched a new national cadastral system, which ease mining approval and management. Mining companies interested mining project in Ethiopia can submit, process and pay their applications online on the Ethiopian cadastral portal. Regional states also integrated to the project.

== List of ministers ==
- Melese Alemu: 18 April 2018 – October 2018
- Samuel Urkato: October 2018 – 18 August 2020
- Takele Uma Banti: 18 August 2020 – January 2023
- Habtamu Tegegne: 20 January 2023 – present
