= Ali Abdo (motorcyclist) =

Egyptian sportspeople (born 1984)

Ali Abdo Ali
- علي عبده
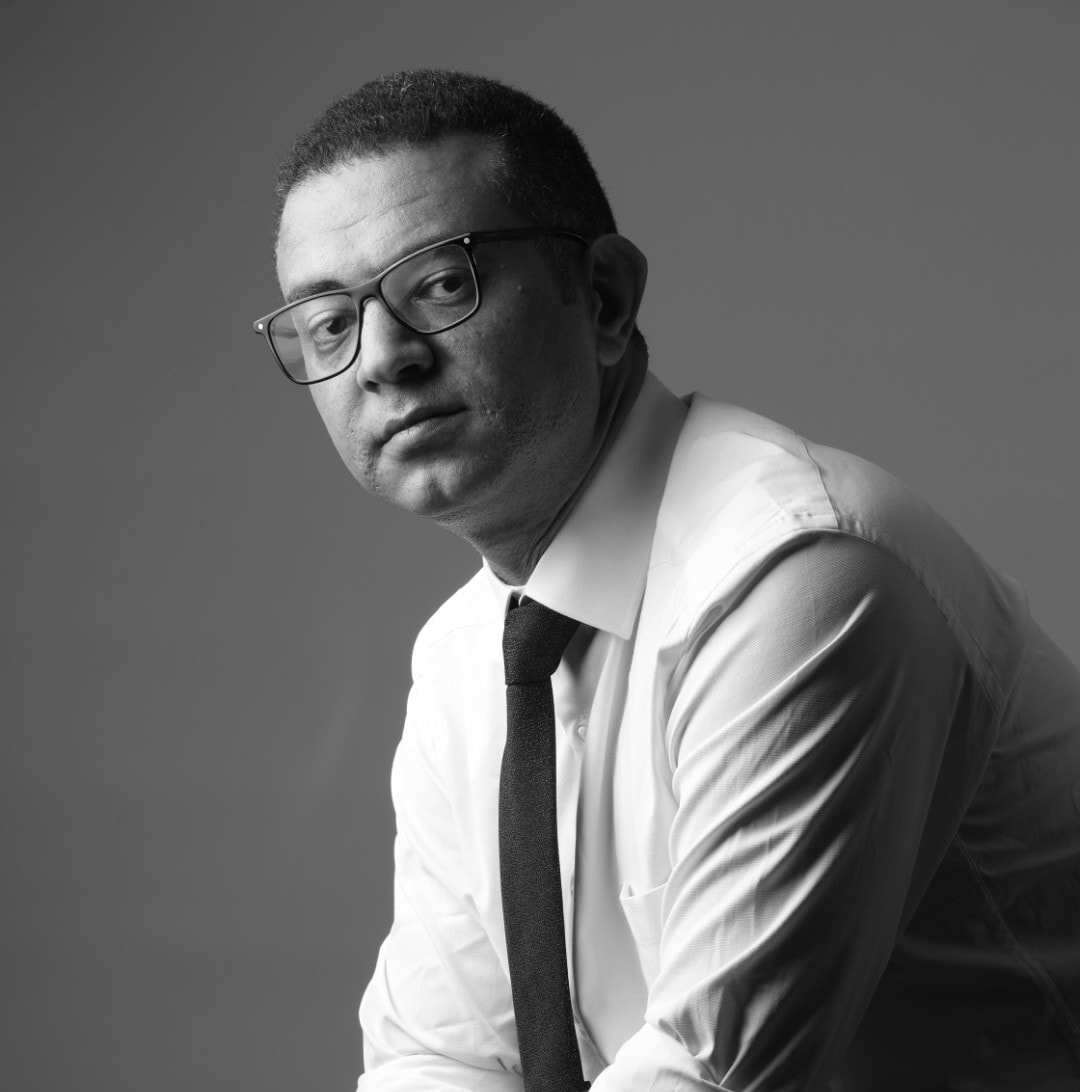
- Born: Ali Abdo Ali; October 2, 1984 (age 41); Alexandria, Egypt
- Education: Master of Business Administration
- Occupation: Sustainability Ambassador
- Employer: MEA Sustainability Studio
- Title: Founder & CEO
- Awards: Guinness World Record Holder

Ali Abdo (born October 2, 1984) Ali Abdo is an Arab sustainability ambassador, climate action advocate, and multiple Guinness World Record holder. Known for his innovative initiatives and record-breaking journeys, Ali's work aims to raise awareness about sustainable development and climate change. He connects people with development efforts and initiatives in unique ways, leveraging his expertise in sustainability and technology to make a meaningful impact.

Advocacy and Achievements

Ali Abdo is a prominent advocate for sustainability and climate action in the MEA region. He holds seven Guinness World Records, including being:

- The first Arab to achieve a world record on a motorcycle. - The first Arab to achieve a world record on an electric vehicle (EV). - The individual with the most world records on electric vehicles.

MEA Sustainability Studio

In 2020, Abdo founded the MEA Sustainability Studio, a regional hub focused on developing sustainability solutions for the Middle East and Africa. The studio creates technology-based tools, training programmes, and public campaigns to address climate and environmental challenges. As CEO, Abdo leads initiatives that combine storytelling, technology, and youth engagement to promote climate literacy across the region.

The Ride to 2030 Initiative

Ali is the founder of The Ride to 2030, an initiative that aligns with the United Nations' Sustainable Development Goals (SDGs). This project uses his passion for long-distance journeys and EVs to promote sustainability, advocate for renewable energy adoption, and inspire communities to take action toward achieving the SDGs by 2030.

Obama Leader Africa

In recognition of his leadership and advocacy efforts, Ali Abdo was selected as an Obama Leader Africa under the Obama Foundation's leadership development program. This program identifies and supports emerging leaders from across the African continent who are dedicated to creating positive social change.

== World Records ==
- Guinness World Records - Longest journey by electric motorcycle. The Longest journey by electric motorcycle is 12,749.82 km (7,922.37 mi) and was achieved by Ali Abdo Ali (Egypt), across Egypt, from 10 October till 8 November 2022.
- Guinness Longest journey by electric motorcycle a single country (individual). The longest journey by electric motorcycle a single country (individual) is 9,759.67 km (6,064.38 mi) and was achieved by ِِAli Abdo Ali (Egypt), across Egypt, from 10 October till 31 October 2022.
- Guinness World Records - Greatest distance on an electric motorcycle in 24 hours (individual). The greatest distance on an electric motorcycle in 24 hours (individual) is 919.87 km (571.58 mi) and was achieved by ِAli abdo Ali (Egypt), in New Alamain, Egypt on 17 September 2021.
- Guinness World Records - Greatest distance on a motocross bike in 24 hours. The greatest distance on a motocross bike in 24 hours by an individual is 613.59 km (381.27 mi) and was achieved by Ali abdo Ali (Egypt) El Gouna, Egypt, on 29–30 June 2017.
- Longest Distance Traveled In Egypt By Motorcycle In Seven Days. Egypt. January 15, 2016. Ali Abdo travelled 5,864 km (3,644 mi) on his motorcycle around different locations in Egypt for seven days.
