= Ali Abdo (politician) =

Ethiopian politician

- Alii Abdoo

27th Mayor of Addis Ababa
- In office 1998 – 24 January 2003
- President: Negasso Gidada; Girma Wolde-Giorgis
- Prime Minister: Meles Zenawi
- Preceded by: Tefera Waluwa
- Succeeded by: Arkebe Oqubay

Personal details
- Party: Oromo Democratic Party
- Other political affiliations: Ethiopian People's Revolutionary Party
- Education: Addis Ababa University

Ali Abdo (Oromo: Alii Abdoo, Amharic: አሊ አብዶ) is an Ethiopian politician who served as 27th mayor of Addis Ababa from 1998 to 2003. He was a member of the now-defunct Oromo Democratic Party.

== Early life ==
Ali Abdo was born to a Warjih family. He graduated from Addis Ababa University, and in the 1970s joined the Ethiopian People's Revolutionary Party.

== Career ==
In the 1990s, he became the 26th mayor of Addis Ababa and was known for simmering tensions within the Muslim community.
