= Alemu Abebe =

Ethiopian politician

- Citizenship: Ethiopia
- Education: Soviet Union
- Occupation: Politician

Alemu Abebe (Amharic: ዓለሙ አበበ) is an Ethiopian politician. He served as mayor of Addis Ababa during the years of the Red Terror.

== Student leader ==
Alemu, a student of veterinary medicine in the Soviet Union, emerged as a veteran leader of the Ethiopian student movement. He had arrived for studies in the Soviet Union in the early 1960s. Alemu was active in the Ethiopian Students Union in Europe. In September 1970 he organized a meeting of six Ethiopian students in Moscow to form a political organization. He would become a leader of the All-Ethiopian Socialist Movement (Meison). When the POMOA was formed in 1975, Alemu was included in its leading committee.

== Mayor of Addis Ababa ==
Alemu Abebe was amongst the second-rank Meison leaders that left the party following the break between the party and the Derg military junta. He continued to work with the Derg, and would later become mayor of Addis Ababa and a member of the politburo of the Workers' Party of Ethiopia. Alemu was sworn in as mayor of the capital on December 8, 1977. The official press agency labelled him 'the first democratically elected mayor' of Addis Abeba. He and the city council had been elected by the kebeles of the city and approved by the government. The election of Alemu followed the assassination of the mayor-elect Gutta Sernessa. As the new mayor of Addis Abeba, Alemu defended the 'Red Terror' campaign against the EPRP in a meeting with foreign journalists in February 1978. However, he claimed that the numbers of killed in the campaign was lower than reported in international media.

== Gang of Four ==
When the Commission for Organizing the Party of the Working People of Ethiopia was founded in 1979, as a forerunner to the Workers Party, Alemu Abebe formed part of the informal grouping in the party leadership called the 'Gang of Four'. The 'Gang of Four' consisted of prominent civilian ideologues in the party hierarchy, in-charge of running the day-to-day affairs of COPWE. When the Workers' Party of Ethiopia was formed, Alemu was put at the helm of the Central Control Commission of the party.

== Later political career ==
Alemu served as mayor of the capital until 1985. In 1987, Alemu Abebe was also appointed as one of the Deputy Prime Ministers, responsible for agriculture, of the People's Democratic Republic of Ethiopia.

In April 1991, as the Derg rule of Ethiopia crumbled, Colonel Mengistu announced in a radio speech that Alemu Abebe had been given the task of forming a new political party, the Ethiopian Democratic Unity Party. The new party was supposed to be more broadly inclusive and replace the Workers Party.

== Arrest and imprisonment ==
Alemu Abebe surrendered to the EPRDF forces on June 1, 1991. On August 10, 2005, Alemu Abebe was sentenced to 20 years of rigorous imprisonment for his role in the Derg rule.

== See also ==
- Timeline of Addis Ababa, 1970s-1980s
