= Anbessa City Bus Service Enterprise =

Ethiopian state-owned public transport operator

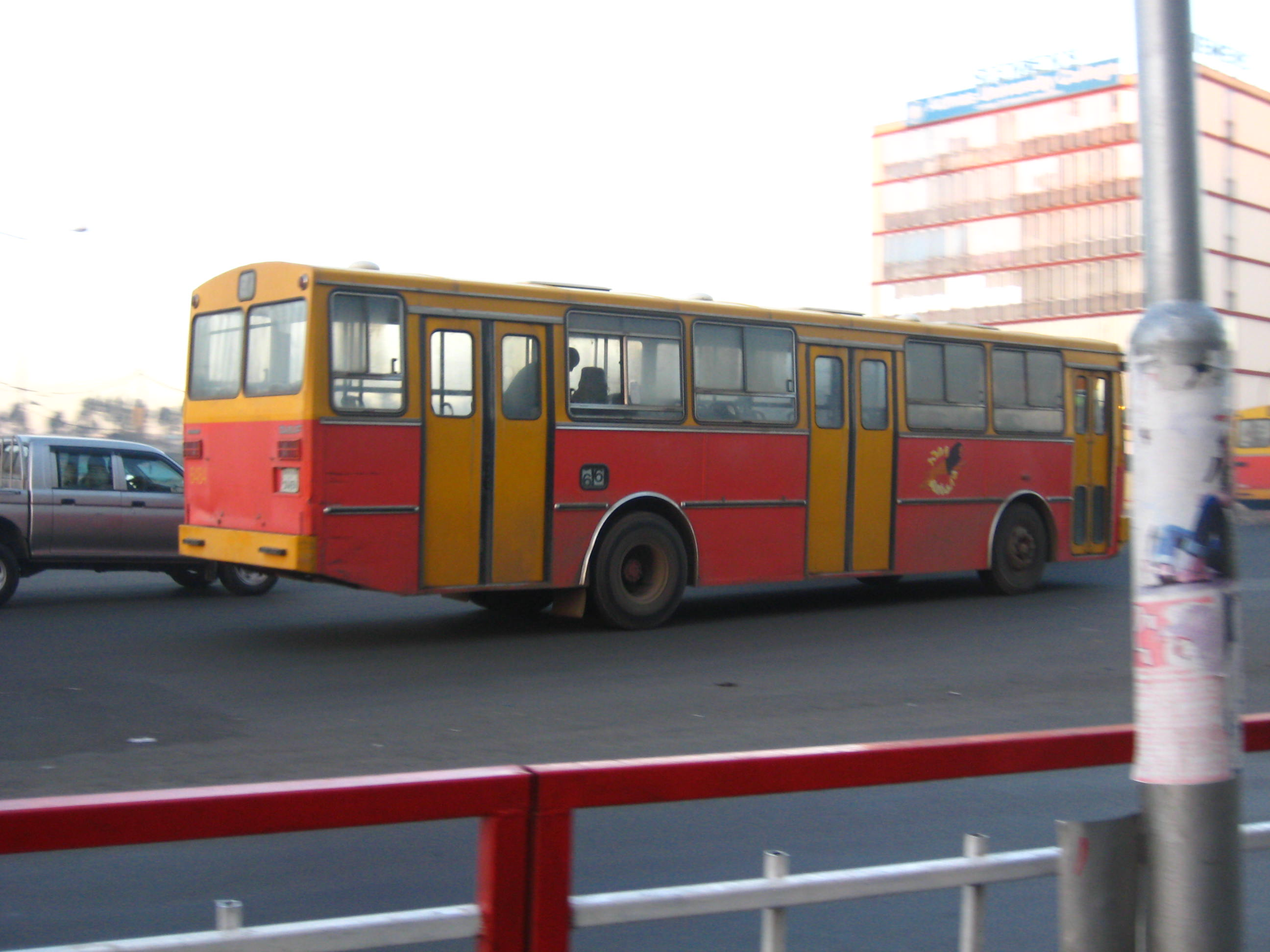
- An Anbessa bus with DAF chassis at Meskel Square in Addis Ababa.

Overview
- Owner: State-owned company
- Area served: Addis Ababa
- Locale: Addis Ababa, Ethiopia
- Transit type: Public transport bus service
- Daily ridership: 1,000,000
- Annual ridership: 296,000,000 per year

Operation
- Began operation: 1945
- Number of vehicles: 1000+

Anbessa City Bus Service Enterprise, ACBSE or Anbessa is a state-owned public transport operator headquartered in Addis Ababa, Ethiopia.

== Name ==
"Anbessa" means lion in Amharic. Lions were a significant symbol for the monarchy at the time, which led to many institutions being named after them. Ato Teferi Shamo named Anbessa, shortly after its formal establishment. In 2023, after nearly 80 years of service, the enterprise dropped the name and is now called "city bus" However, existing vehicles still retain the name on their exterior.

== History ==
Anbessa started its operations by converting trucks left behind by the Italians after their occupation of Ethiopia. It operated informally until 1948 when The Anbessa City Bus service started as a share company owned by Emperor Haile Selassie, some state owned companies and members of the royal family. It had 40 Italian drivers and mechanics with 80 Ethiopian trainee recruits.

The first livery of Anbessa buses was green and yellow, inspired by the colors of the Ethiopian flag and had only two routes:

- Route 2: Piassa to Genet Hotel
- Route 4: Cinema Ethiopia to Kasanchis

The leaping lion logo, used by the enterprise for much of its history, was designed by an Italian artist.

In a rebranding, Anbessa shifted its livery to the current yellow and red, based the lower two bands of the Ethiopian flag. Although this is contested by some claiming it is based on the jersey of Saint George Football club.

In 1974, the Derg military government dissolved the share company and nationalized the enterprise.

After the fall of the Derg in 1991, the EPRDF re-established it as a public enterprise.

Anbessa acquired buses assembled locally by the Metal & Engineering Corporation, a military industrial complex of the Ethiopian government. It has included in its fleet more than 500 of these locally assembled buses known as Bishoftu Buses, which bear the town's name where the assembly plant is located. Eight of these buses are in Jimma, although Anbessa only operates in Addis Ababa and special zones of Oromia Regional State. Currently, there are around 1000 city buses under the enterprise. Nearly 40 percent of these were out of service due to technical issues.

In 2023, Anbessa City Bus Service Enterprise merged with Sheger Bus, a relatively newer and smaller government-owned bus operator. The combined company became known simply as "City Bus" a move that garnered criticism regarding the preservation of historical heritage. The merger also included the change of buses livery to full green, However buses from both operators still maintain the original livery and name on the exterior bodies of the buses before the merger as of 2025. The merger also caused arbitrary dismissal of about 400 employees from the enterprise, which caused controversy

== Vehicles ==
=== Historical ===
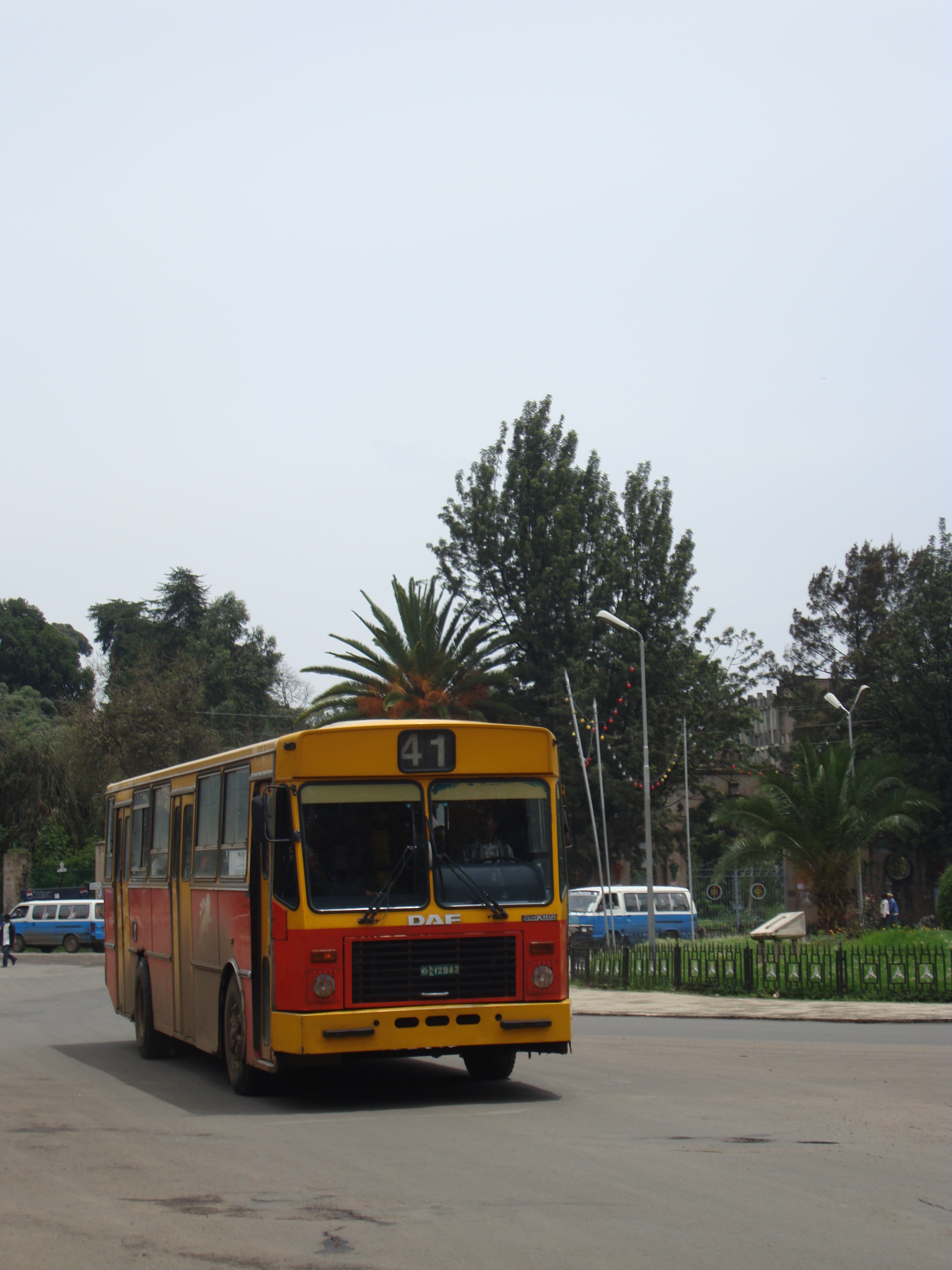
Anbessa's DAF Berkhof

- Fiat Trenta-quattro Trucks: trucks that were converted for passenger transport.
- BIAMAX Modified Mercedes Buses: Based Modified Mercedes-Benz bus chassis
- Tata Buses: imported from India.
- Ikarus Buses: from Hungary, showing Ethiopia's ties with the Soviet bloc. These buses were common in socialist countries.
- Volvo Buses
- Mercedes Jonckheere: Mercedes-Benz buses with bodies built by the Dutch company Jonckheere.
- DAF TB2105 Berkhoff Jonkherre: DAF TB2105 chassis with Berkhoff bodies from both Berkhoff and Jonckheere (Dutch)
- HuangHai Bishoftu: HuangHai buses assembled in Bishoftu, Ethiopia. Notorious for poor quality with some being permanently out of service in as little as 6 months.

The enterprise does not consider the preservation of historical bus models.

=== Current ===
As of 2025 the fleet predominantly consists of Yutong models in low-floor, double decker and mid-floor designs. As of 2025, very few DAF and HuangHai buses remain in service, with many of these older buses repurposed as container houses for Sheger Bread shops.

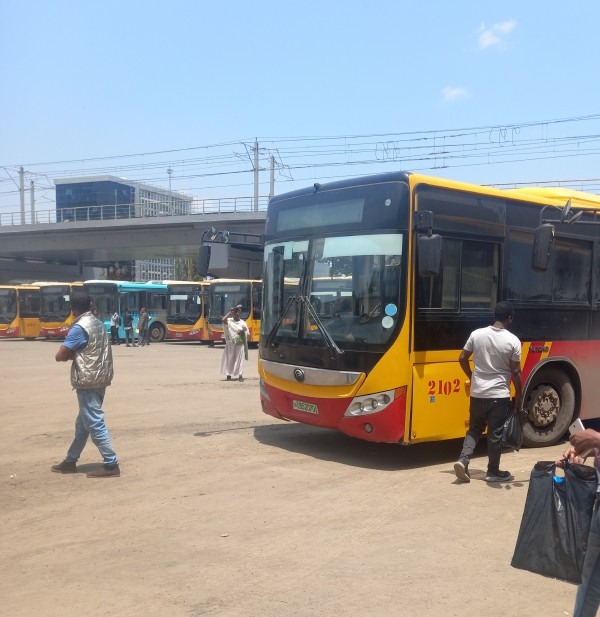
Anbessa's Yutong bus around Addis Ababa stadium

The first Yutong buses added to the Addis Ababa Bus fleet in 2017 were assembled by METEC. These buses have the Yutong badge and model number were removed and are largely mid-floor with few double deckers.

In 2022, the enterprise added another 110 Yutong low-floor buses, which were fully assembled in China. The total number of buses amount to 1500

These buses cover a collective distance of 54,000 km daily and provide their services to 1.5 million people, as indicated in the 2006/07 to 2010/11 five year strategic document of the City Administration.

== Routes ==
The enterprise operates 172 routes across and beyond the capital. Sheger bus, which had merged with the enterprise dropped its routing scheme to follow the original routes.

== See also ==
- Marathon Motors Engineering
- Transport in Addis Ababa
- Metals and Engineering corporation
