= Takele Uma Banti =

Ethiopian politician

- Taakkalee Uumaa Bantii

CEO of Ethio-Djibouti Railways
- Incumbent
- Assumed office 16 July 2024
- Preceded by: Abdi Zenebe

Minister of Mines and Petroleum
- In office 18 August 2020 – 14 January 2023
- Prime Minister: Abiy Ahmed
- Preceded by: Samuel Urkato
- Succeeded by: Habtamu Tegegne

31st Mayor of Addis Ababa
- In office 17 July 2018 – 18 August 2020
- Deputy: Solomon Kidane
- Preceded by: Diriba Kuma
- Succeeded by: Adanech Abebe

Head of the Oromia Transport Bureau
- In office November 2016 – 2018

General Manager of Oromia Urban Land Sectors
- In office September 2013 – November 2016

Mayor of Sululta, Oromia Region
- In office 1 July 2010 – 30 June 2011

Personal details
- Education: Addis Ababa University (BSc, MSc); Harvard University
- Website: EDRSC

Takele Uma Banti (Oromo: Takala Umaa Bantii, Amharic: ታከለ ኡማ ባንቲ) is an Ethiopian politician who is the CEO of Ethio-Djibouti Railways since 2024. He was the Minister of Mines and Petroleum from 2020 to 2023. He was Mayor of Addis Ababa from 2018 to 2020.

== Early life and education ==
Takele was born in the town of Ambo, located in Shewa, Ethiopia. He holds Bachelor's degree in Chemical Engineering, a Master's degree in Environmental Engineering, both obtained from Addis Ababa University.He then possessed Master's in Public Administration from Harvard University. Additionally certifications from Harvard University and the Galilee International Management Institute, as well as a Master of Science in Economics from Addis Ababa University.

== Career ==
=== Mayor of Addis Ababa ===
Takele worked for several years as an associate partner in political offices of Ethiopia and others. On 17 July 2018, he was elected as Mayor of Addis Ababa by Addis Ababa City Council saving as deputy mayor. The election was made during the 5th extraordinary session in accordance with the revised proclamation by the House of people's Representatives and was succeeded by Diriba Kuma.

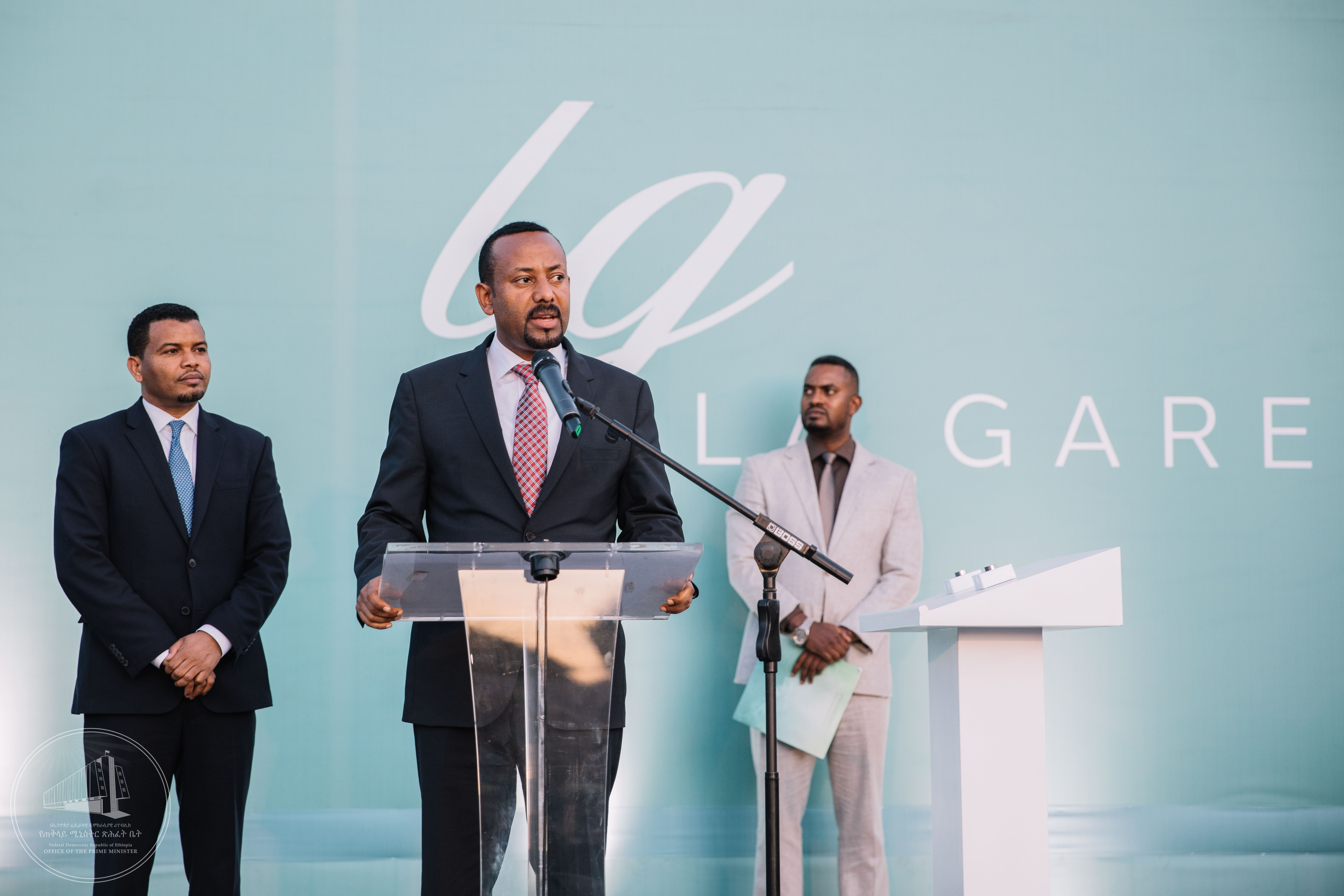
Takele (in far left) with Prime Minister Abiy Ahmed during his speech on 16 November 2018

On 16 October 2019, he formed new cabinet which approved by the administration council where 19 officials from head of different offices were appointed. The session was attended by 89 members, three of the nominees were women, 79 members favor of nomination while the three were against and seven were abstained.

=== Minister of Mines and Petroleum ===
Takele was appointed as Minister of Mines and Petroleum of Ethiopia from 18 August 2020 to 14 January 2023. As a minister of mines and Petroleum, his strategic leadership led to increase in gold exports, solidifying the mining sector as a major contributor to Ethiopia's foreign exchange earnings, from there he established a partnership between the Colorado School of Mines and Addis Ababa Institute of Technology to offer a dual Masters program in Mining and Petroleum Engineering.

=== Ethio-Djibouti Railway ===
On 16 July 2024, Takele was appointed as chief executive officer of the Ethio-Djibouti Railways by Prime Minister Abiy Ahmed.
