= Arkebe Oqubay =

Ethiopian politician (born 1957)

- ኣርከበ ዑቕባይ
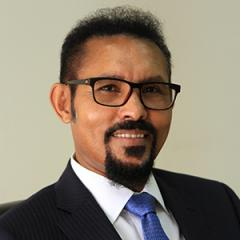
- Arkebe in 2020

Senior Minister and Special Adviser to the Prime Minister of Ethiopia
- Incumbent
- Assumed office 2018
- Prime Minister: Abiy Ahmed

28th Mayor of Addis Ababa
- In office 24 January 2003 – 9 May 2006
- President: Girma Wolde-Giorgis
- Prime Minister: Meles Zenawi
- Preceded by: Ali Abdo
- Succeeded by: Berhane Deressa; Berhanu Nega (elect)

Personal details
- Born: 1957 (age 68–69) Addigrat, Tigray Province, Ethiopian Empire

Arkebe Oqubay (Tigrinya: ኣርከበ ዑቕባይ; born 1957) is an Ethiopian politician who is serving as Senior Minister and Special Adviser to the Prime Minister of Ethiopia since 2018. He was the mayor of Addis Ababa from 2003 to 2006.

== Background ==
Arkebe is a member of the Tigray People's Liberation Front. He has been at the centre of policymaking and government leadership for over thirty years. Oqubay has been a member of the core leadership of Tigrayan People's Liberation Front (TPLF) and Ethiopian People's Revolutionary Democratic Front (EPRDF), the movement that spearheaded the seventeen-year popular liberation struggle. During the liberation movement, Oqubay was a member of the executive council responsible for socio-economic affairs of the liberation army and liberated areas. He is strongly backed by Prime Minister Abiy Ahmed.

In September 2026, Oqubay joined the Executive Board of the Global Center on Adaptation (GCA), serving alongside Jan Peter Balkenende, former prime minister of the Netherlands.
