= Endowment Fund for the Rehabilitation of Tigray =

- Native name: ትካል እግሪ ምትካል ትግራይ
- Industry: Textiles, Transportation, Agriculture, Construction, Mining, Construction Materials
- Founded: 1995
- Area served: Ethiopia

The Endowment Fund for the Rehabilitation of Tigray (EFFORT; Tigrinya: ትካል እግሪ ምትካል ትግራይ) is a conglomerate of businesses factories mainly based in Tigray Region, Ethiopia.

== Companies ==
EFFORT's major companies are:
Name	Industry
Mesebo Cement/Building	Construction
Sur Construction	Construction
Mesfin Engineering	Construction
Maichew Particleboard	Construction
Romanat Packaging	Construction
Almeda Textile/Garment	Textiles
Sheba Leather	Textiles
National Geotextile/Gabion	Textiles
Guna Trading	Agriculture
Hiwot Agriculture	Agriculture
Bruh Tesfa Irrigation	Agriculture
Raya Field Agroprocessing	Agriculture
Abergelle Livestock	Agriculture
Ezana Mining	Mining
Saba Stones	Mining
TransEthiopia	Transportation
Addis Pharmaceuticals	Pharmaceuticals

EFFORT holds a 51% stake in Addis Pharmaceuticals, the minority shareholder being a Private Equity Company EFFORT no longer owns Selam Horticulture, Dimma Honey, and Raya Field Agroprocessing.

== History ==
EFFORT was founded in order to improve the local economy Tigrayan economy, which was devastated by the Ethiopian Civil War and the 1983–1985 famine.

On 18 November 2020, BNN Bloomberg reported that EFFORTs fund were frozen because its subsidiaries had allegedly "participating in financing ethnic-based violence, acts of terrorism, connection with the TPLF, which seek[ed] to overthrow the constitutional order."

EFFORT was damaged significantly by the Tigray War, with Almeda Textile, Ezana Mining, Saba Stones and Sheba Leather being left completely destroyed.
