= EHRC–OHCHR Tigray investigation =

Investigation into human rights abuses in Tigray, Ethiopia

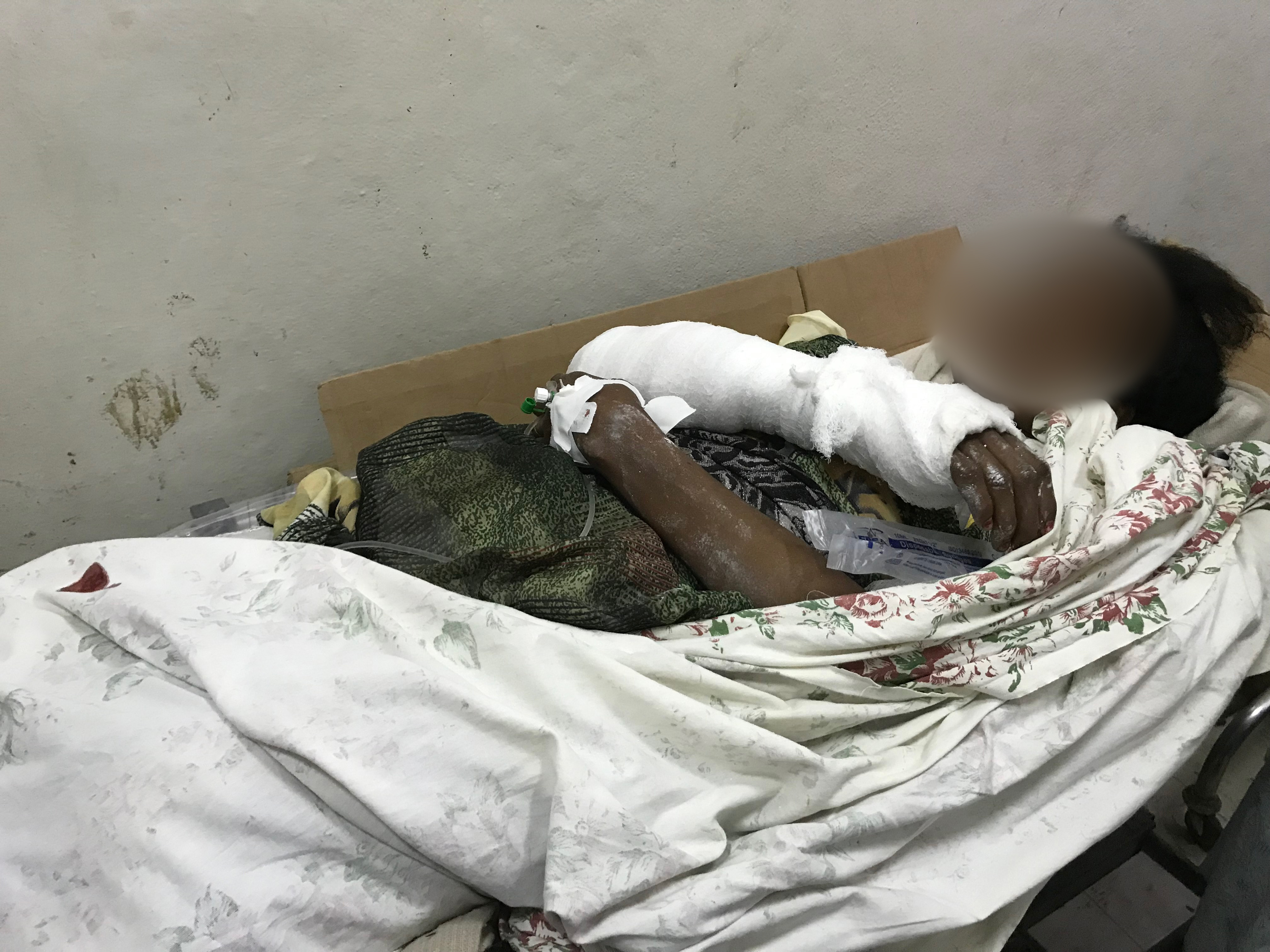
One of the civilian victims of the Togoga airstrike

The EHRC–OHCHR Tigray investigation is a human rights investigation launched jointly by the Ethiopian Human Rights Commission (EHRC) and the Office of the United Nations High Commissioner for Human Rights (OHCHR) in mid-2021 into human rights violations of the Tigray War that started in November 2020. The EHRC–OHCHR joint investigation team's report was published on 3 November 2021.

== Background ==
Human rights violations in the Tigray War that started in November 2020 were widely viewed as war crimes including systematic sexual violence, possibly amounting to rape as a weapon of war, crimes against humanity or genocide.

== Creation ==
In March 2021, the United Nations High Commissioner for Human Rights, Michelle Bachelet, stated that the Ethiopian Human Rights Commission (EHRC) and the Office of the United Nations High Commissioner for Human Rights (OHCHR) had agreed to carry out a joint investigation into human rights violations during the Tigray War. Bachelet referred to "possible war crimes".

The OHCHR stated that the investigation would cover "human rights violations and abuses allegedly committed by all parties in the context of the Tigray conflict". The OHCHR stated that itself and the EHRC had an ongoing partnership and shared objectives for human rights accountability for the Tigray War. The initial phase of the investigation was planned for a three-month period.

== Leadership and members ==
Sonny Onyegbul, one of the OHCHR human rights staff working on the investigation, was deported from Ethiopia along with six other UN officials in October 2021, for what the federal authorities described as "meddling in internal affairs".

== Investigation schedule ==
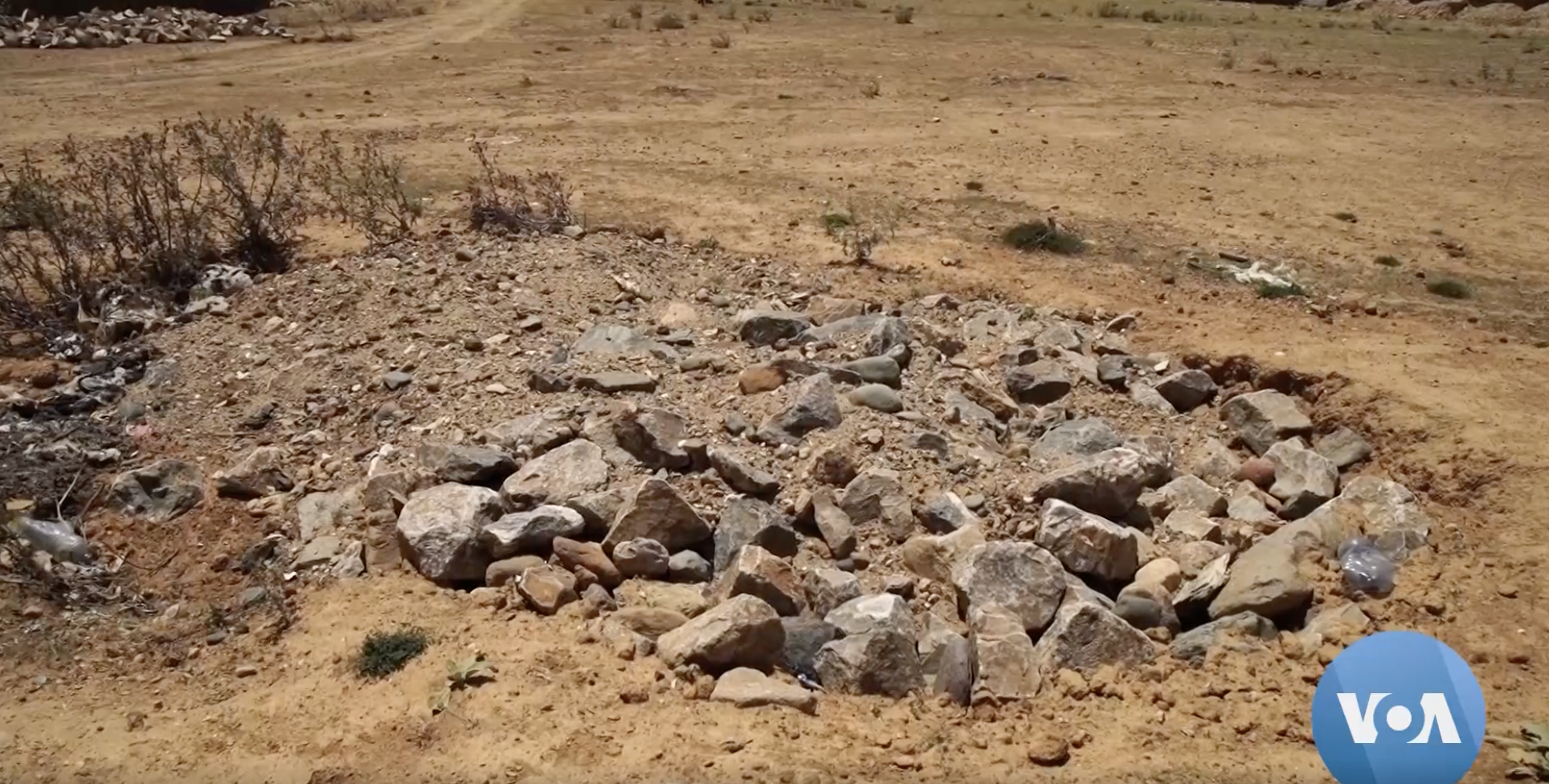
One of the numerous mass graves of civilian victims in Tigray, massacred by ENDF and allied forces, that the joint commission will need to investigate

In May 2021, the OHCHR and EHRC signed an agreement detailing "geographic scope, issues of investigation and engagement mechanisms". Six people were selected by each of the two commissions to create a team of twelve investigators. Legal, gender, security and translation staff were also appointed. Daniel Bekele, head of the EHRC, stated that the EHRC had received no communications from the African Commission on Human and Peoples' Rights (ACHPR) on possible cooperation in the investigation.

In July 2021, during its 47th session, the UNHRC called for the OHCHR to provide administrative, technical and logistical support for strengthening the capacity of the EHRC and the Ethiopian criminal justice system and requested updates on the investigation to be provided at the UNHRC's 48th and 49th sessions.

The initial phase, scheduled from 16 May to 20 August, was extended in September, with 1 November 2021 announced as the new release date of the joint commission's report. A visit to Axum in relation to the Axum massacre had been prevented by "sudden changes in the security situation and in the conflict dynamics" according to the UN High Commissioner for Human Rights Michelle Bachelet.

== Report ==
=== Publication and structure ===
The EHRC–OHCHR joint investigation team (JIT) published its full 156-page report on 3 November 2021, including a 6-page executive summary, descriptions of methods, legal framework and context, detailed findings, an "overall findings" summary, a discussion of accountability mechanisms and the JIT's recommendations. The report includes, as annexes, requests to the Eritrean government, to the TPLF and to the government of Amhara Region for responses to the JIT's findings, and a 22-page response by the Ethiopian federal government.

=== Recommendations ===
As summarised by Human Rights Watch (HRW), the report recommends that a full-scale international investigation be carried out in order to "identif[y] the pattern and scale of abuses, and those responsible for the worst crimes up to the present".

== Reception ==
The governments of Australia, Belgium, Canada, Denmark, Finland, France, Germany, Iceland, Ireland, Luxembourg, the Netherlands, New Zealand, Norway, Sweden, the United Kingdom, and the United States released a joint statement in which they expressed:

Notwithstanding the considerable challenges faced in gaining access to places, people and documentation, we commend OHCHR and EHRC for their impartial and transparent work. We also underscore the value of the investigation’s collection and documentation of human rights abuses and violations, and violations of international humanitarian law, for the purpose of supporting justice and accountability on behalf of victims and survivors.

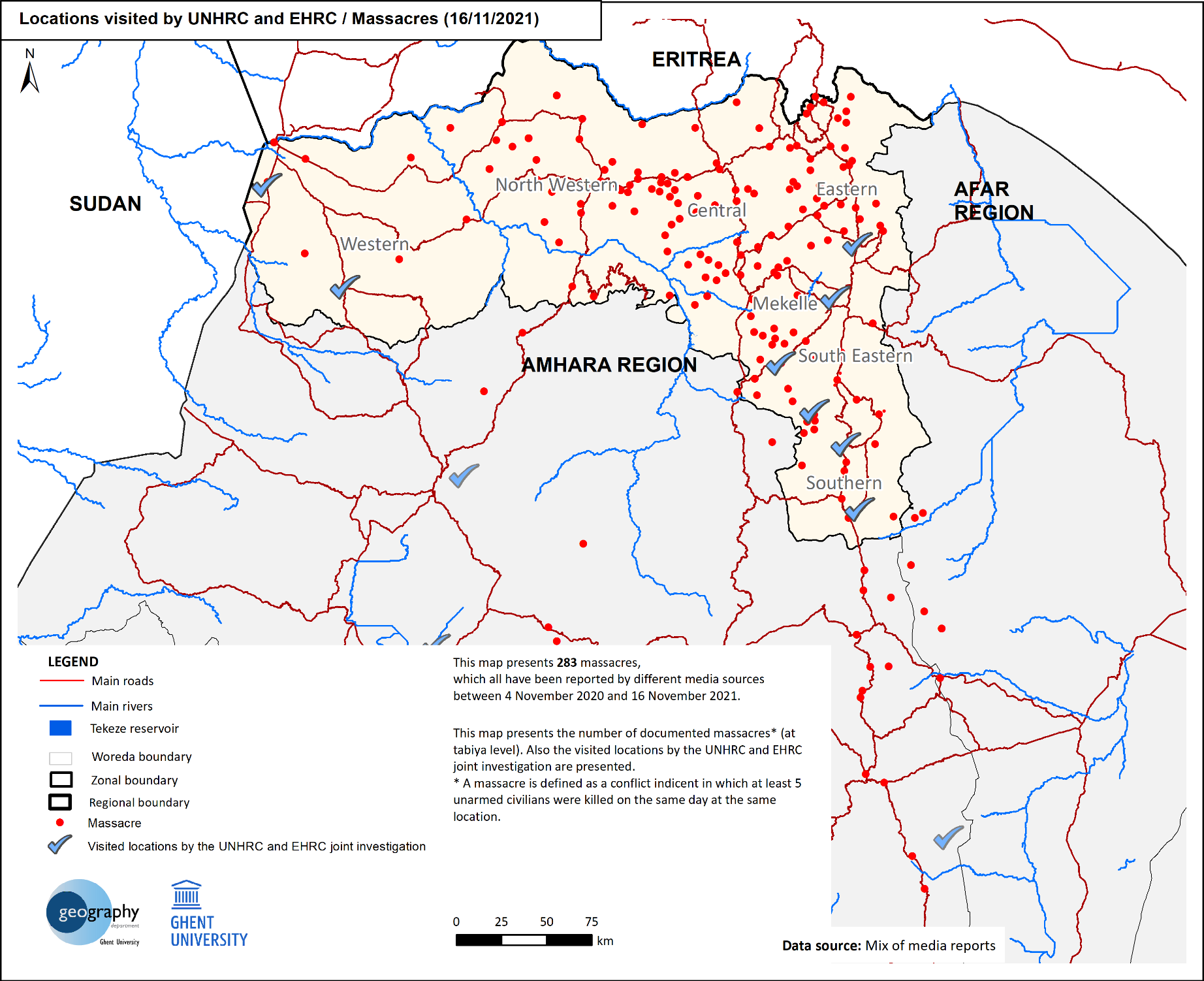
Occurrence of massacres in the Tigray War up to 16 November 2021 (red dots), with sites visited by the joint EHRC–OHCHR investigation (blue checkmarks).

Following the 3 November 2021 publication of the report, Alex de Waal described the report as "deeply flawed" and criticised its coverage of the famine in Tigray Region, saying that the report "only mentioned a handful of starvation crimes and [had] nothing to say about the unlawful siege on Tigray imposed since June." De Waal stated that "Abiy's hunger plan is an international crime to be exposed, sanctioned, and punished, not appeased."

HRW says that the report gives too little attention to "well-documented trends", only briefly mentions the "abuses committed by Amhara regional forces and militia against Tigrayans in western Tigray", "fails to acknowledge the scale of abuses, including sexual slavery, by Ethiopian, Eritrean, and Amhara forces targeting Tigrayan women and girls", and "glosses over the deliberate and extensive destruction and pillaging of health infrastructure, and the intimidation and killing of humanitarian workers."

The Guardian described "many Tigrayans in Ethiopia and abroad" as "outright reject[ing]" the EHRC's participation in the joint investigation.

Gebrekiros Temare Getachew, writing in Ethiopia Insight, criticised the EHRC's participation. He argued that there was a structural bias, with Tigrayans de facto excluded from the House of Peoples' Representatives, to which the EHRC is legally accountable. He criticised the EHRC's preliminary report on the Mai Kadra massacre for presenting "ethnic Amharas as the sole victims", and the four-month delay between the Axum massacre and EHRC's preliminary report on it. He criticised the lack of attribution of perpetrators in the EHRC's report of sexual violence in the Tigray War. Gebrekiros also argued that the investigation would be ineffective because of Tigrayans' mistrust of the EHRC and because of EHRC's lack of institutional capacity and experience.

In June 2021, Debretsion Gebremichael, the leader of the Tigray Region, "rejected" the investigation, stating, "It's very clear they are partial."

Members of the investigating team told Associated Press that Daniel Bekele, head of the EHRC, understated evidence of abuses by Amhara forces and emphasized abuses by Tigrayan forces. Bekele stated that the commission was independent and "primarily accountable to the people it is created to serve". The Guardian described the concerns about limitations to the report, but expected the report to "nevertheless be the most authoritative overview of the war and its consequences".

== See also ==
- ACHPR Tigray investigation
- International Commission of Human Rights Experts on Ethiopia
