= Famine in northern Ethiopia (2020–present) =

Famine occurred during the Tigray War

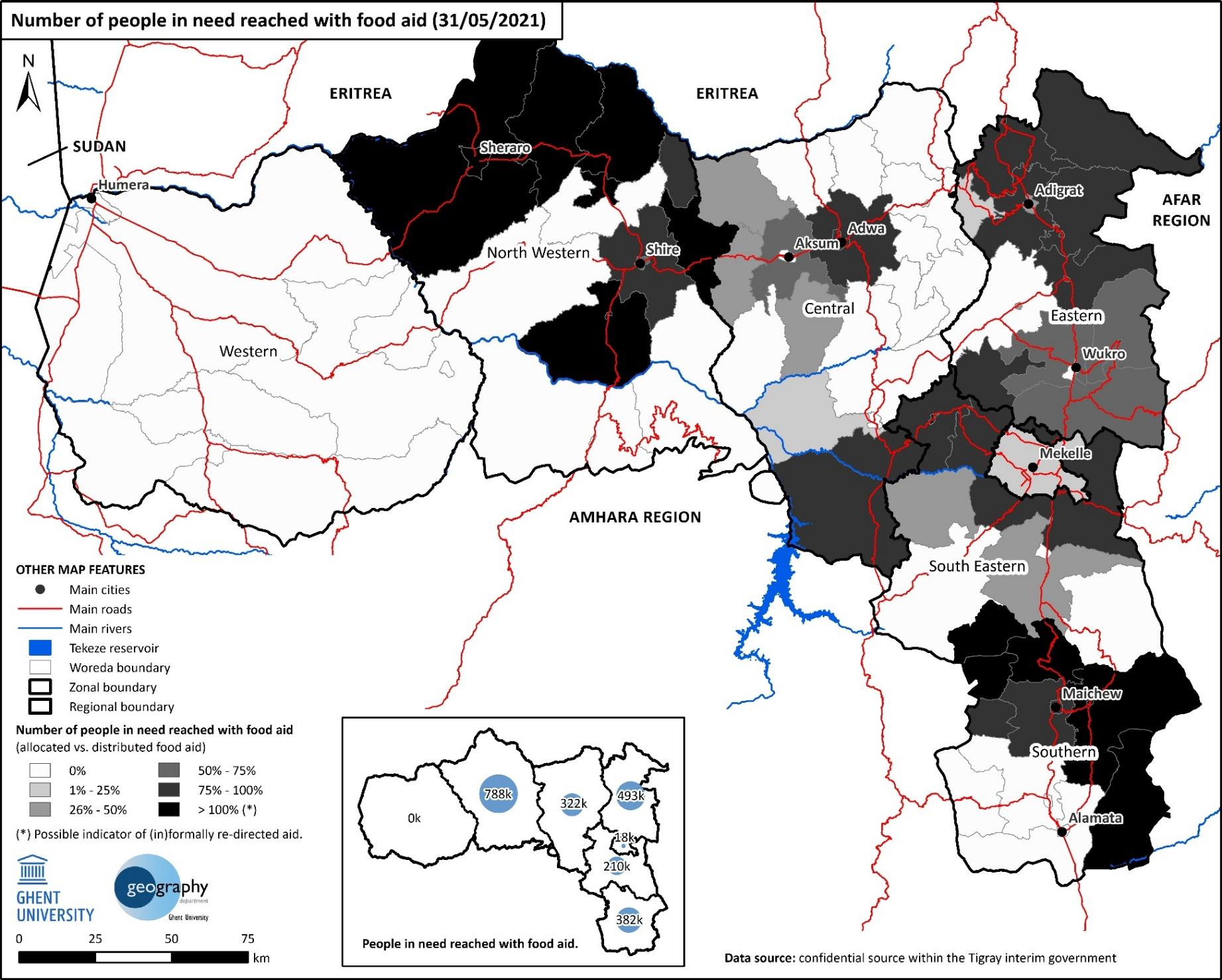
- May 2021 map of people in need of humanitarian assistance that received food aid in the Tigray Region.
- Country: Ethiopia
- Location: Tigray Region, Amhara Region, Afar Region
- Period: c. November 2020 – present
- Total deaths: 150,000–200,000+ (March 2022)
- Death rate: 50–100 people per day (April 2021); 437-914 people per day (per Ghent University Oct 2022)
- Causes: civil war, drought, inflation, locust swarms
- Relief: $1.3 billion; 58% funded (May 2021)
- Consequences: 13,000,000 in need of food aid (August 2022)

Beginning with the onset of the Tigray war in November 2020, acute food shortages leading to death and starvation became widespread in northern Ethiopia, and the Tigray, Afar and Amhara Regions in particular. As of August 2022, there are 13 million people facing acute food insecurity, and an estimated 150,000–200,000 had died of starvation by March 2022. In the Tigray Region alone, 89% of people are in need of food aid, with those facing severe hunger reaching up to 47%. In a report published in June 2021, over 350,000 people were experiencing catastrophic famine conditions (IPC Phase 5); as of October 2026, it continued to be a crisis-level issue (IPC Phase 3). It is the worst famine to happen in East Africa since 2011–2012.

In addition to the Tigray war, which caused mass displacement and loss of harvests, it was exacerbated by then-ongoing drought and locust infestations in the region. Both during and after the war, the famine has been characterized by repeated disruptions to the distribution of humanitarian aid, including through blockades by the Ethiopian federal government, looting by various armed actors, the stymieing of grain shipments caused by the Russian invasion of Ukraine, and the dismantling of USAID by the second Trump administration.

As reported by The Economist, the federal Ethiopian government was "deliberately holding back food in an effort to starve" the Tigray People's Liberation Front (TPLF); a claim disputed by the Ethiopian government in late January 2021. On 10 February 2021, Abera Tola, head of Ethiopian Red Cross Society (ERCS), described displaced people "reach[ing] camps in Tigrayan towns [being] 'emaciated'" and that "their skin [was] really on their bones." He estimated that "eighty percent" of Tigray was unreachable by humanitarian assistance. In early February 2021, Muferiat Kamil, Ethiopian Minister of Peace, agreed with World Food Programme representatives to allow increased food distribution in Tigray Region. While the situation improved after the March 2022 truce and allowed for humanitarian distribution of food, the lack of rain in the spring of 2022 compounded the already existing food insecurity. The resurgence of fighting after the ceasefire collapsed in August 2022 exacerbated the situation even more; by October, between 400 and 900 a day were dying of starvation.

== Impact ==
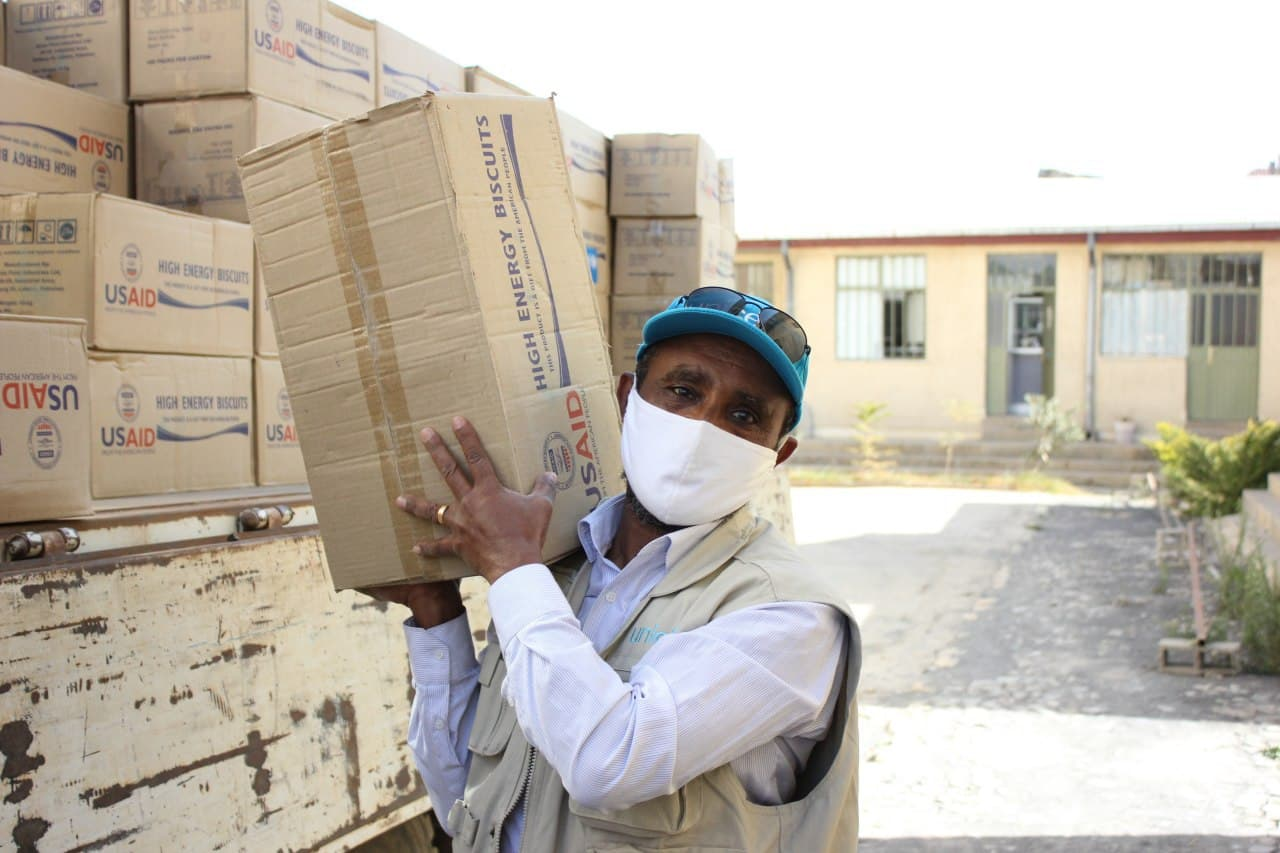
USAID food aid, high energy biscuits in Tigray

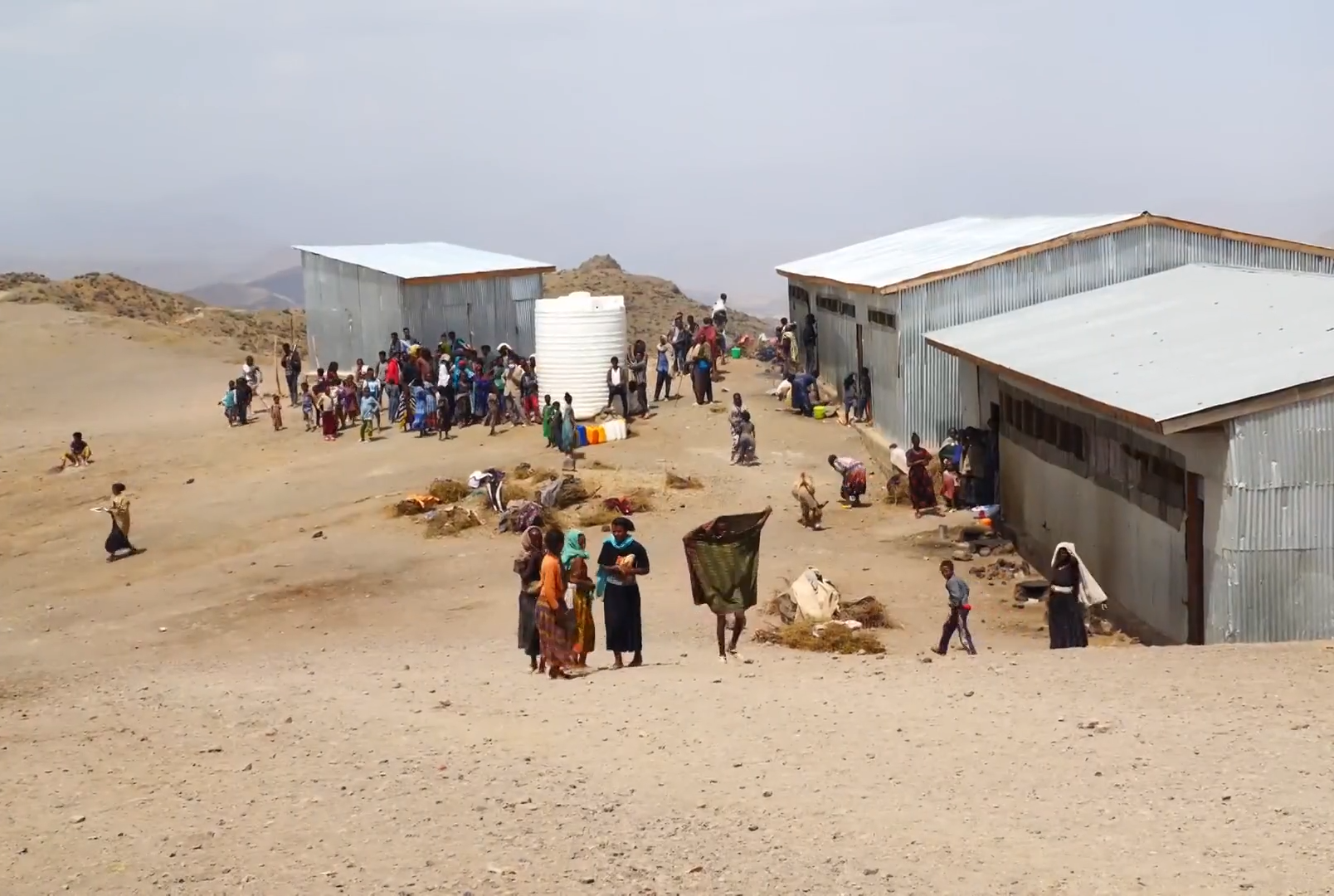
IDP camp of people who had fled starvation in Soqota, Amhara Region (May 2022)

In an 8 January meeting of the Tigray Emergency Coordination Center between international aid groups and Transitional Government of Tigray officials in Mekelle, capital of Tigray Region, a regional administrator, Berhane Gebretsadik, estimated that "hundreds of thousands" were at risk of starvation if food aid wasn't increased, and that in Adwa, people were "dying while they [were] sleeping".

A federal official claimed that there was "no starvation in Ethiopia" on 19 January 2021, according to The Economist.

On 22 January 2021, The Economist described estimates by Famine Early Warning Systems Network (FEWS NET) as Tigray being "probably one step from famine" and quoted a "Western diplomat" estimating, "We could have a million dead there in a couple of months".

In early February 2021, the FEWS NET classified the level of starvation in Tigray Region under the Integrated Food Security Phase Classification (IPC) criteria as "Emergency (Phase 4)" in the central areas and as "Crisis (Phase 3)" in the rest of Tigray Region apart from Western Tigray. FEWS NET saw the armed conflict and access constraints, low levels of economic activity and income-earning, and "significant disruption to market activity" as being key factors for phase 4 level acute food security to continue in central and eastern Tigray through to May 2021.

According to Human Rights Concern Eritrea (HRCE), prior to the Eritrean refugees in the Shimelba and Hitsats refugee camps being forced to return to Eritrea, they were so hungry that they were "forced to eat grass and roots".

On 10 February 2021, Abera Tola, head of Ethiopian Red Cross Society (ERCS), stated,

Displaced civilians who have managed to reach camps in Tigrayan towns are 'emaciated'. You see their skin is really on their bones. You don't see any food in their body.

Abraha Desta, head of the opposition political party Arena Tigray and head of the Bureau of Social Affairs of the Transitional Government of Tigray, stated that "eighty percent" of Tigray was unreachable for humanitarian assistance. He predicted that the number of deaths by starvation could mount to "tens of thousands" within two months.

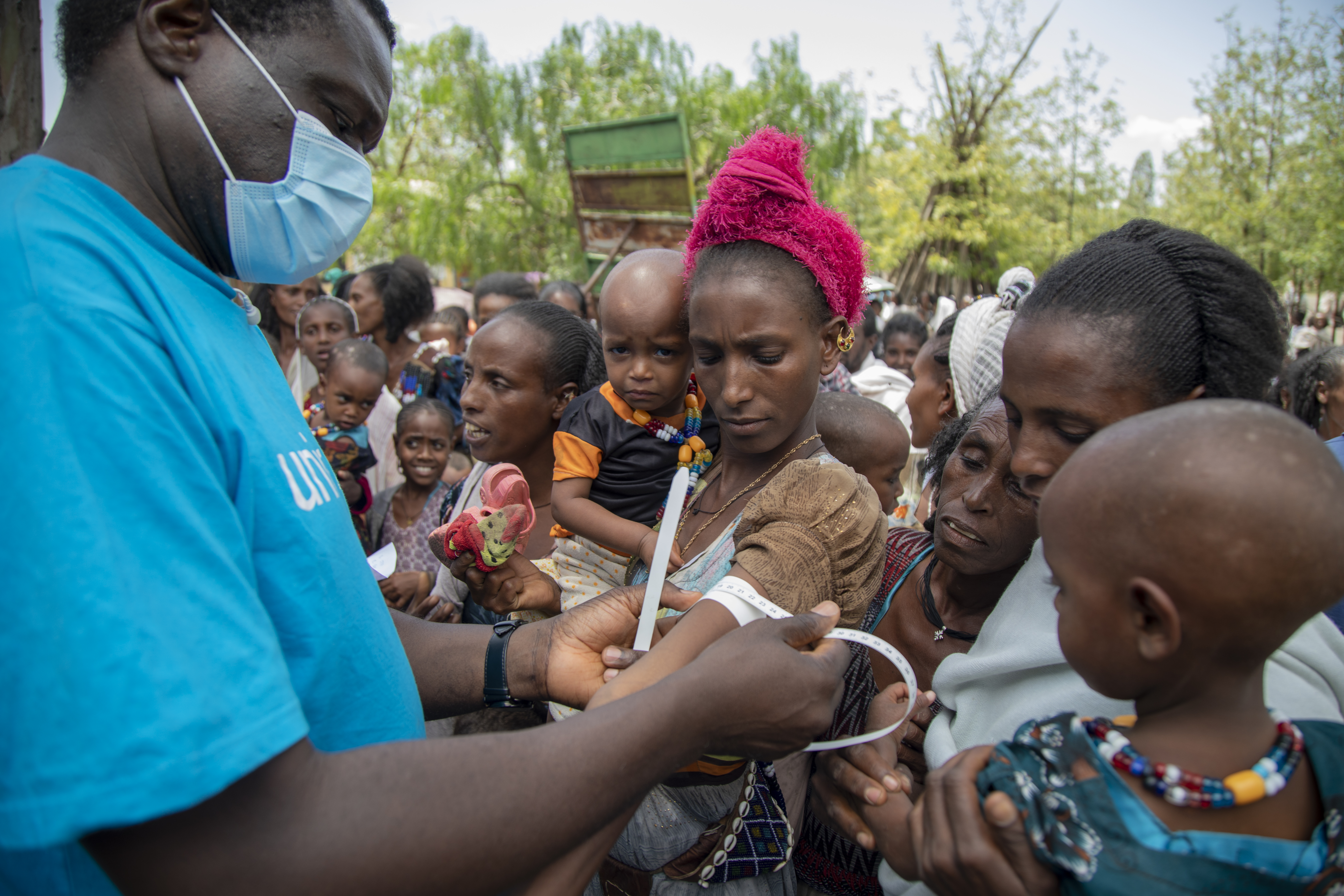
UNICEF employee examines a woman in Tigray for symptoms of malnutrition, July 2021

On 2 July 2021, the United Nations Security Council discussed the issue and told that more than 400,000 people were being affected by food insecurity and that 33,000 children were severely malnourished. The report also stated that 1.8 million people were on the brink of famine.

By September 2022, UNICEF reported that around 29.7 million people in Ethiopia were in need of humanitarian assistance.

In April 2024, the FEWS NET stated that Emergency (IPC Phase 4) and Crisis! (IPC Phase 3!) outcomes that were occurring were expected to persist into September, at the time of the next harvest. High levels of food aid sharing resulted in lower food portions per household despite humanitarians increasing their range of aid, and many households had to resort to sending children to beg, selling all their livestock in already poor condition, and migrating to adjacent nations as well as Saudi Arabia.

As of October 2026, areas in the southern Tigray were facing droughts which prolonged food insecurity into "crisis-level conditions" as classified by Phase 3 of the IPC. Fighting disrupted fuel supplies, market activity, transportation, harvests – physically and monetarily restricting access to food, farmland, labor opportunities, and other essential goods. According to the FEWS NET, these conditions risked the IPC Phase 3 conditions continuing.

=== Death counts ===
==== Transitional government of Tigray ====
Abraha stated on 25 January 2021 that reports had been received of 10 people who had died from starvation in Gulomahda woreda, which in the 2007 census had 84,236 inhabitants; and 3 starvation deaths in Adwa, which had 40,500 residents in the 2007 census. The mortality rate for a phase 5 famine is 2 deaths per 10,000 inhabitants per day.

In June 2021, a Tigray regional health official stated that the district administrator of Mai Kinetal in Indafelasi, Berhe Desta Gebremariam, had reported 125 deaths by starvation, describing people as "falling like leaves", as well 315 other deaths, 558 people who had been victims of sexual violence, and the looting of 5,000 homes.

On 16 November 2021, Dr Hagos Godefay, the former head of the health bureau in the pre-conflict Tigrayan government, announced that research had confirmed that at least 186 children under the age of 5 had died in Tigray due to starvation between late June and October 2021.

==== United Nations OCHA ====
On 15 April 2021, Mark Lowcock of OCHA said that four internally displaced people in Tigray Region were known to have died of hunger that week, and 150 people had died of hunger in Ofla, Tigray.

On 16 June 2022, the specialised digital service of OCHA, ReliefWeb, released a statement on the famine situation affecting the entirety of the Horn of Africa, including Ethiopia. The statement announced that 'one person is likely dying from hunger every 48 seconds in the region.

==== Other estimates ====
On 14 October 2021, Jan Nyssen of Ghent University estimated that from 425 to 1201 people were dying of starvation per day in Tigray Region.

== Causes ==
=== Civil society ===
On 8 February 2021, the boards of the Tigrai Development Association (TDA) and the Relief Society of Tigray (REST), two local NGOs trusted by Tigrayans, were dissolved by federal authorities.

=== Economic ===
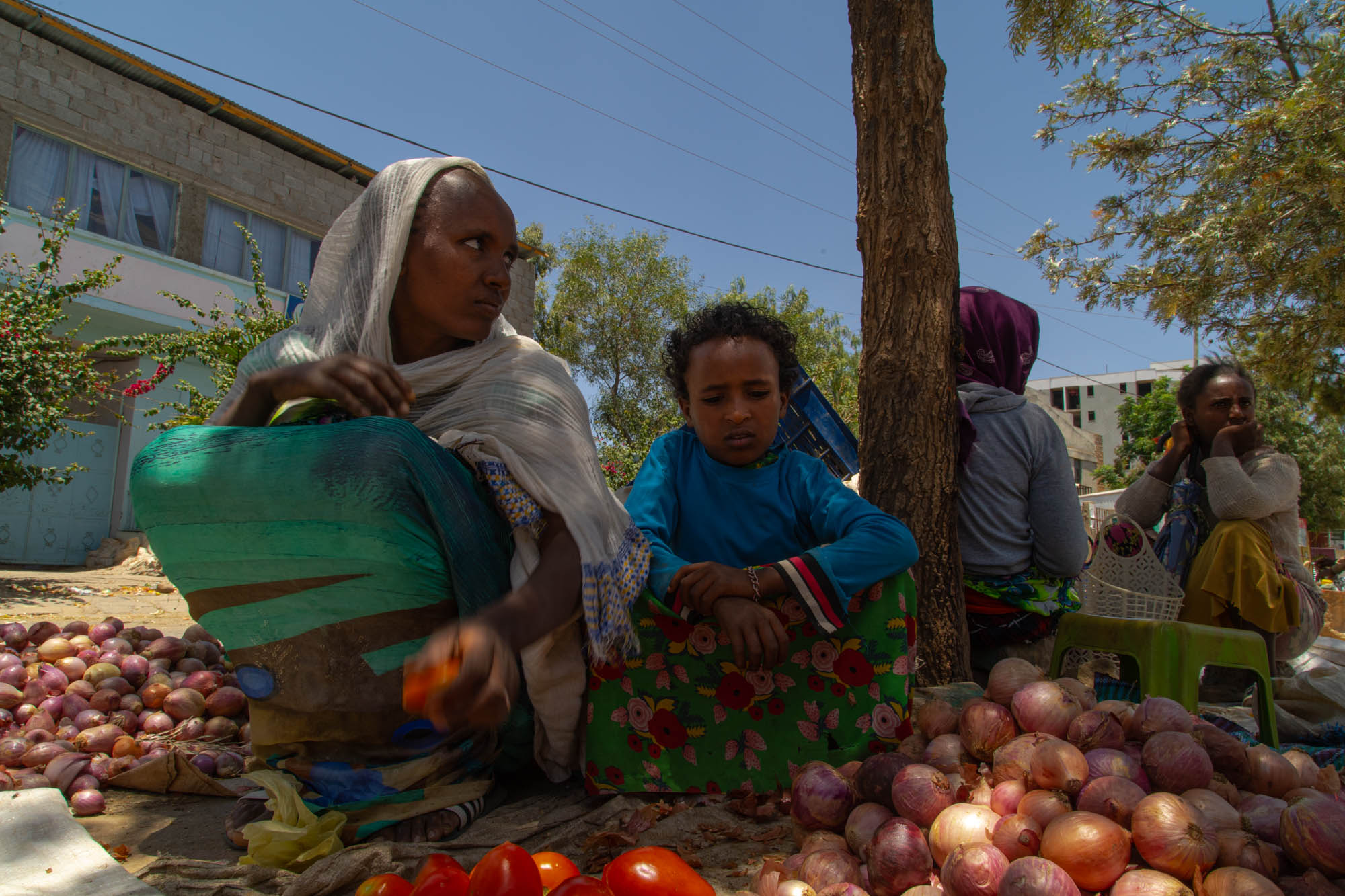
Woman tries to sell tomatoes and onions on an almost empty market in Hawzen on 6 June 2021

Ethiopia had an average inflation rate of 26% in 2021 and 30% in 2022, something that was largely driven by a rise in food prices; in February 2023, the overall inflation rate reached 32%, and Ethiopia continued to experience high inflation by September 2023, with commonly purchased food items becoming more expensive.

=== Environmental ===
==== Drought ====
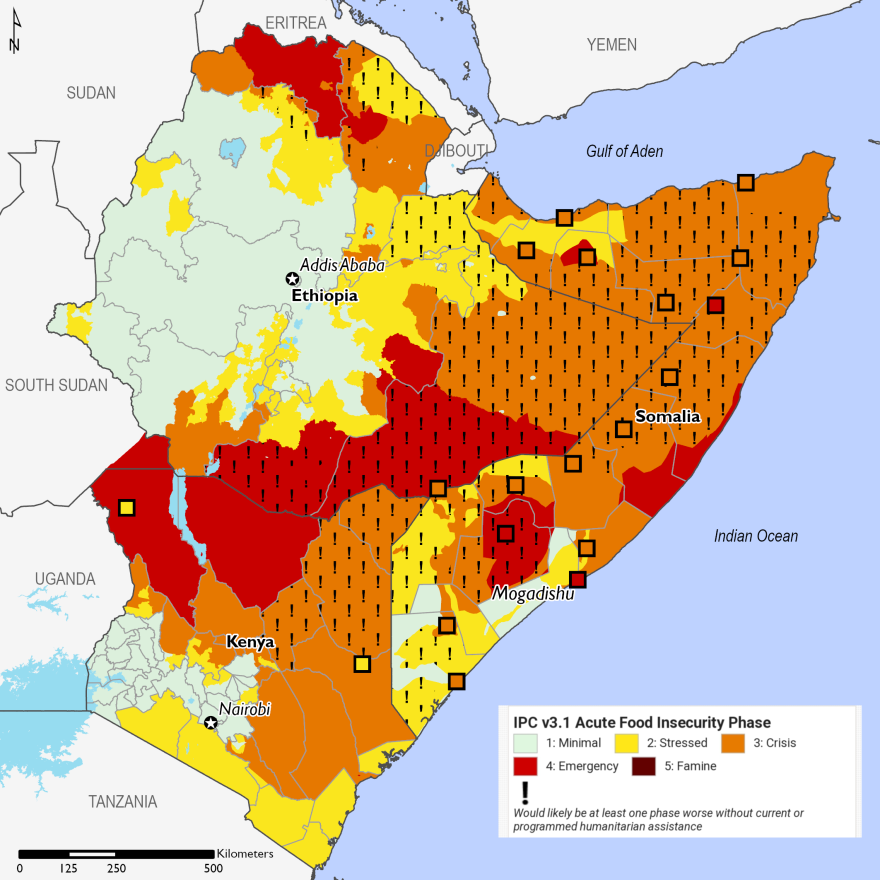

The 2020–2023 Horn of Africa drought is a drought that hit the countries of Somalia, Ethiopia, and Kenya. The rainy season of 2022 was recorded to be the driest in over 40 years, with an estimated 43,000 in Somalia dying in 2022. The drought ended in early 2023, when Horn of Africa experienced above-average rainfall that led to multiple flooding events.

==== Locust swarms ====
Between June 2019 and February 2022, a major outbreak of desert locusts began developing, threatening food supplies in East Africa, the Arabian Peninsula and the Indian subcontinent. The outbreak was the worst to hit Kenya in 70 years, and the worst in 25 years for Ethiopia, Somalia, and India.

The locust infestations began when Cyclone Mekunu in 2018 produced heavy rains in the Rub' al Khali of the Arabian Peninsula; in spring 2019, swarms spread from these areas, and by June 2019, the locusts spread north to Iran, Pakistan, and India and south to East Africa, particularly the Horn of Africa. By the end of 2019, there were swarms in Ethiopia, Eritrea, Somalia, Kenya, Saudi Arabia, Yemen, Egypt, Oman, Iran, India, and Pakistan. By June 2020, a separate swarm appeared in South America, affecting Paraguay and Argentina.

In April 2020, travel and shipping restrictions precipitated by the spread of COVID-19 began to hamper efforts to control the locusts, preventing the transport of pesticides, equipment, and personnel, and contributing to the global incidence of COVID-19 related food insecurity.

Locust swarms worldwide faced a steady decline in size from May to October 2020, as countries and intergovernmental organisations instituted extensive aerial and ground pest control efforts, aided by low quantities of rainfall in several affected regions, as well as the absence of storm activity in the Indian Ocean. By October 2020, Ethiopia, Eritrea, Somalia and Yemen continued to harbour significant swarms of locusts, with the remainder situated in isolated pockets of Kenya, Sudan and Saudi Arabia. Locust swarms continued to threaten countries around the southern Red Sea and Gulf of Aden, as well as their immediate neighbours, until February 2022 when the surge was officially declared to be over.

=== Looting and removal of basic services ===
All parties to the conflict have been accused by USAID of looting aid shipments.

==== Looting by the TPLF/TDF ====
On 31 August 2021, USAID's mission director in Ethiopia, Sean Jones said: "We do have proof that several of our warehouses have been looted and completely emptied in the areas, particularly in Amhara, where TPLF soldiers have gone into, I do believe that the TPLF has been very opportunistic," in a televised interview with state broadcaster EBC in Addis Ababa. On 25 August 2022, the World Food Programme accused the TPLF of stealing 570,000 liters of fuel meant to transport humanitarian aid.

In March 2022, the Ethiopian Human Rights Commission stated that the TDF had "carried out widespread and organized pillaging, looting and destruction of government administration facilities, public service facilities" in the Afar and Amhara regions.

==== Looting by federal Ethiopian, Eritrean and Amhara forces ====
Human Rights Watch and Amnesty International described Tigrayans being targeted with impunity, both by military and civilian groups:

Federal and allied forces looted Tigrayan homes, businesses, livestock, and crops as they took over towns and villages. Amhara Special Forces, Fano militias, and Eritrean military forces — when they were present — carried out the bulk of the looting, but groups in civilian clothes, some armed, others not, later joined them. […] Two interviewees said they saw security force members loot homes and businesses, selectively targeting Tigrayan property.

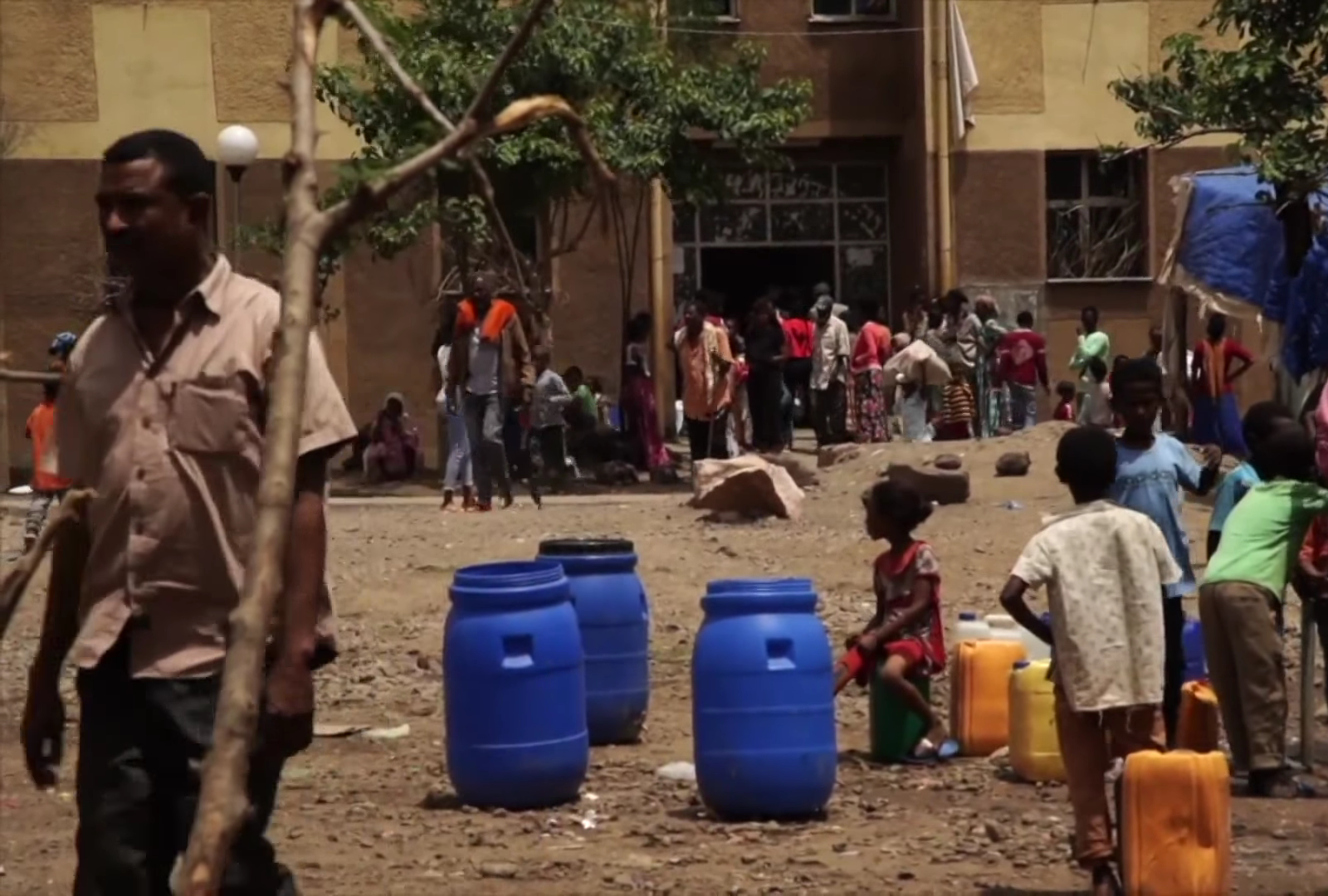
IDP camp in Axum, Tigray Region (June 2021)

Anti-Tigrayan forces engaged in what HRW and Amnesty described as "pillag[ing]", with "schools, courts, churches, and health centers", in addition to civilian houses, being subject to looting. Amhara and Eritrean forces also took harvests, livestock and medicine from Tigrayan farmers, who were threatened with violence if they did not comply; these actions caused the looted areas to face "extreme starvation" by June 2021. Multiple witnesses, from separate villages, gave similar descriptions of Amhara militias and security forces "waiting for farmers to collect or harvest [sorghum crops] before stealing [them]." A witness to the Axum massacre stated that the EDF "burned crops […] forced farmers and priests to slaughter their own animals […] stole medicine from health facilities and destroyed the infrastructure." Reports of Eritrean looting continued into late 2022, with allegations that the EDF was seizing food and other materials from Tigrayan homes, in violation of the November 2022 peace agreement.

=== Role of international weapons sales ===
An investigation revealed in November 2021 that the UAE opened an air bridge to provide extensive military support to the Ethiopian government, which has killed tens of thousands of civilians and displaced millions. More than 90 flights were operated between Sweihan Base, Abu Dhabi, and Harar Meda Base, south of Ethiopia's capital Addis Ababa, between September and October 2021. The UAE took support of two private shipping companies, including one Spanish and one Ethiopian firm, to carry out this extensive operation. The satellite images also showed a Chinese-made Wing Loong drone at the Ethiopian airport.

On 27 November 2021, The Economist reported that Turkey, Iran, Israel and the UAE were all selling weapons to Ethiopia, while relations soured between the US and Ethiopia. The UAE was accused of flying drones. The Emirates had also pledged billions in aid. The help from such autocratic powers escalated the war in Tigray, causing humanitarian crisis for tens of millions of Ethiopians.

== Food aid distribution ==
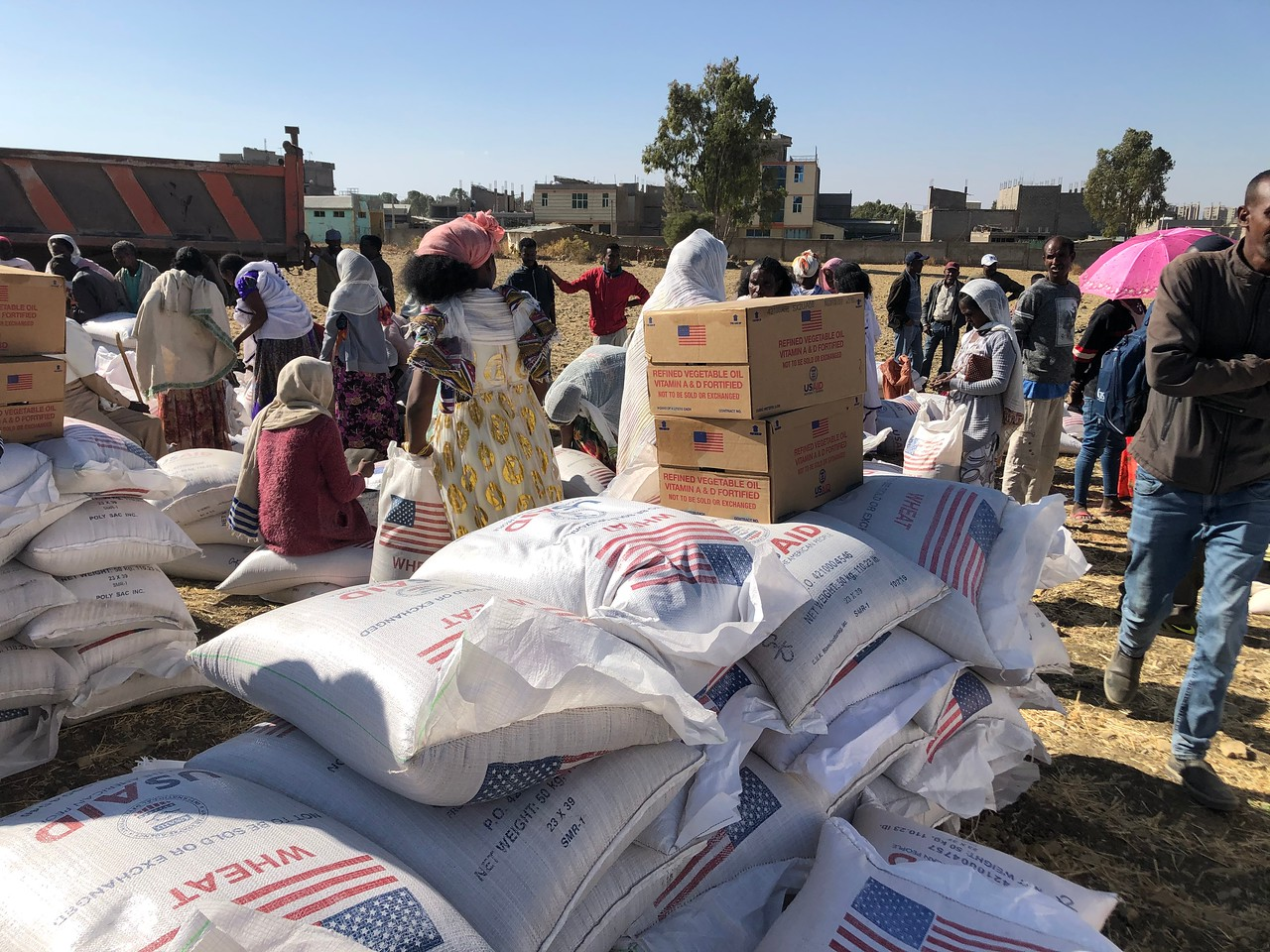
Distribution of USAID food aid, wheat, in Tigray

On 25 January 2021, Abraha Desta stated that many people were displaced after having their property looted and that food was available, but there was a distribution problem, since drivers were afraid. He stated that foreign aid organisations were unable to leave the capital Mekelle due to security concerns for convoys. He described the situation as "'unprecedented in its history', and that 4.5 million people were in need of emergency food assistance". The Economist described the access blocks as including the initial federal government authorisation, authorisations from neighbouring regional governments, and blocks by local armed forces "citing security" or fears about food being provided to the TPLF.

Muferiat Kamil, Ethiopian Minister of Peace, agreed with World Food Programme representatives to "scale up" food distribution in Tigray Region, authorising 25 international staff for access, while another 49 awaited approval. On 12 February, a total of 53 international staff of United Nations agencies and NGOs had received approval to enter Tigray Region.

=== Blockade of aid deliveries ===
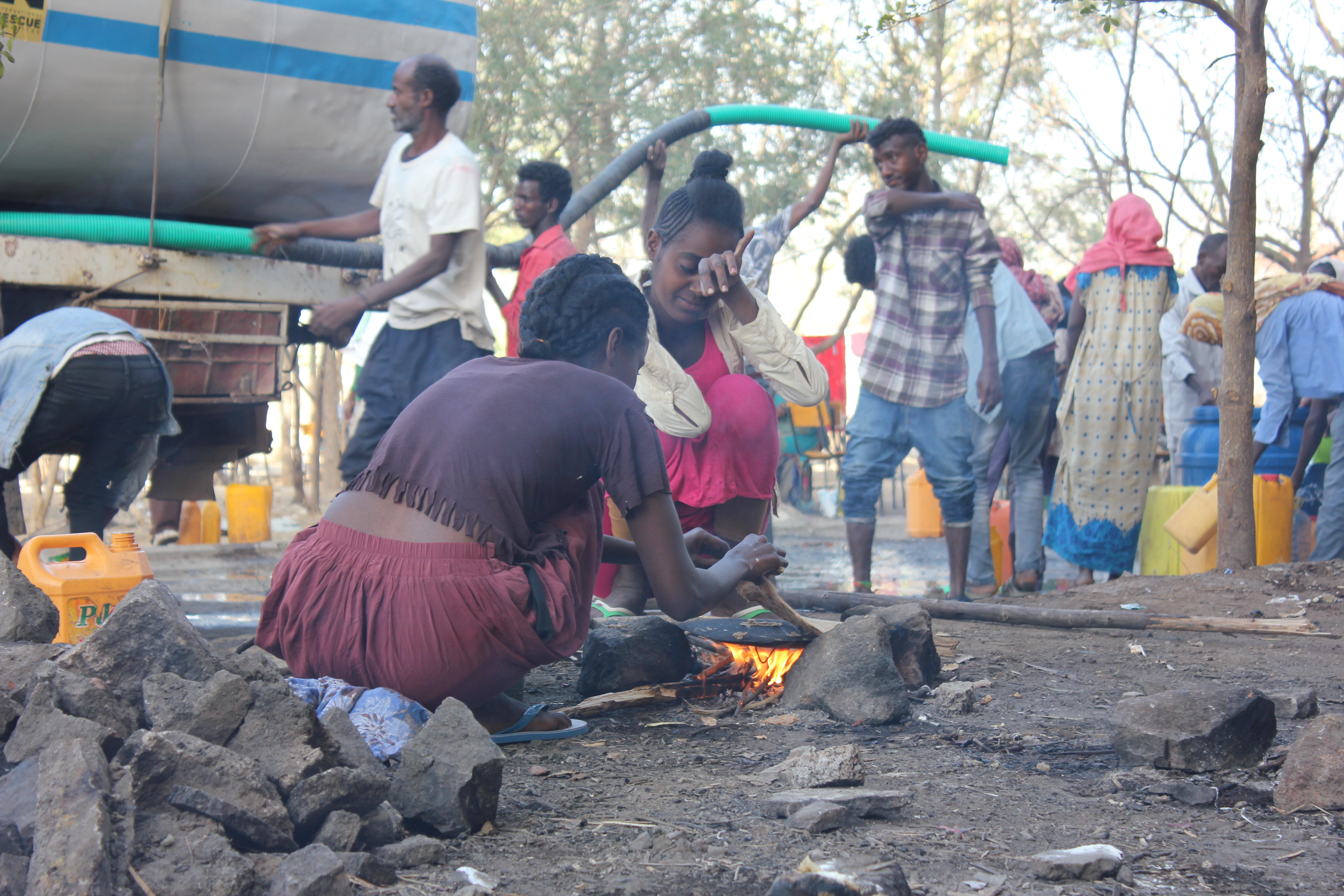
Internally displaced people in Shire, Tigray (April 2021)

On 1 February 2021, Jan Egeland, head of the Norwegian Refugee Council, stated that "twelve weeks since the start of conflict in [Tigray Region], meaningful humanitarian operations [had] still not begun", with aid organisations unable to access much of the region, especially away from Mekelle and major roads, and with administrative delays and unpredictability in obtaining authorisations for access. Egeland stated that he had "rarely seen a humanitarian response so impeded and unable to deliver in response for so long, to so many with such pressing needs." By 15 April 2021, humanitarian aid distribution continued to be blocked on several of the main roads by the Eritrean Defence Forces, and by Amhara Region security forces.

The government of the Amhara-occupied Western Zone did little to help the local Tigrayan population, and in a number of cases, actively participated in marginalizing and discriminating against them. A 2022 HRW–Amnesty report described them as "complicit in the theft of Tigrayan property". The authorities placed restrictions on their ability to harvest food, and denied them access to international aid. Ethiopian troops had reportedly withheld food from going to Tigrayan civilians who were suspected of having links to Tigrayan fighters. A student based in Europe, and in contact with her family in Tigray Region, said in February 2021 that in the Irob woreda where her family lives, "If you don't bring your father, your brothers, you don't get the aid, you'll starve."

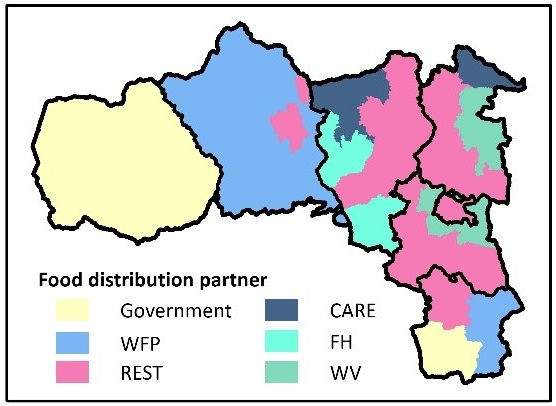
Food distribution partners in Tigray on 31 May 2021

On 30 September 2021, following a UN statement about the federal Ethiopian blockade against deliveries of food aid to Tigray, the federal government expelled seven senior United Nations (UN) officials. The federal Ethiopian authorities accused the UN officials of "meddling" in Ethiopian "internal affairs". The officials were given 72 hours to leave Ethiopia. On 4 November 2021, researcher Alex de Waal called for UN organisations to negotiate the shipping of food aid into Tigray Region directly with the Tigrayan government, the Oromo Liberation Army "and whoever controls territory and people", overriding the political control of the federal Ethiopian authorities if necessary.

By the summer of 2022, the government blockade of essential services to Tigray was still in place, and the humanitarian situation remained severe, with roughly 13 million people being in need of food aid. According to the World Food Programme, while international aid had technically been allowed into the region during the 2022 ceasefire, in practice, very little aid was reaching the people that needed it most, largely due to fuel not being made available in this area.

==== Withholding of food aid by the United States ====
In March 2023, the U.N and American authorities paused food aid to 1/6th of Ethiopia's population over massive thefts of the aid supplied to the country. This ban was extended in June 2023, after showing no improvements. At least 700 starvation-related deaths were recorded in the ban period between March and June 2023.

Beginning in January 2025, a near-total freeze on foreign aid was put in place by the Donald Trump administration, which set out to actively dismantle USAID and withhold payments to their staff. Prior to this, Ethiopia had been a major recipient of aid from the United States, and the biggest one in sub-Saharan Africa. Agencies responsible for distributing food from USAID to 1 million people in Tigray were forced to stop, being unable to pay for employees or the logistics needed to distribute it.

==== Claims of intentional starvation by federal Ethiopian-allied forces ====
Alex de Waal argued in December 2020 that the looting by the EDF of cars, generators, food stores, cattle, sheep and goats in Tigray Region was a violation of international criminal law that "prohibits a belligerent from removing, destroying or rendering useless objects indispensable to the survival of the civilian population" (Rome Statute, Article 7, 2.(b)).

On 22 January 2021, The Economist claimed that it was "likely that the authorities [were] deliberately holding back food in an effort to starve the rebels out." The burning of crops and abandonment of fields prior to harvest time were listed by The Economist as causative factors of starvation.

In early April 2021, the World Peace Foundation published a report in which it listed Article 8(2)(b)(xxv) of the Rome Statute of the International Criminal Court, "Intentionally using starvation of civilians as a method of warfare by depriving them of objects indispensable to their survival, including wilfully impeding relief supplies as provided for under the Geneva Conventions" and Articles 270(i) and 273 of the 2004 Ethiopian Penal Code as appropriate criminal laws in relation to starvation in the Tigray War. Section 4 of the report listed evidence. The authors concluded that the Ethiopian and Eritrean governments were responsible for starvation, and that "circumstantial evidence suggest[ed] that [the starvation was] intentional, systematic and widespread."

In early October 2021, Mark Lowcock, who led OCHA during part of the Tigray war, stated that the Ethiopian federal government was deliberately starving Tigray, "running a sophisticated campaign to stop aid getting in" and that there was "not just an attempt to starve six million people but an attempt to cover up what's going on."

In November 2021 in Human Geography, Teklehaymanot G. Weldemichel argued that "famine [in Tigray Region] was from the start an end goal of the Ethiopian and Eritrean" governments. Teklehaymanot listed key tactics that he saw as inducing a famine to include the systematic looting and destruction of infrastructure; banking measures that blocked access to cash; and a siege obstructing humanitarian aid.

In its September 2022 report, the International Commission of Human Rights Experts on Ethiopia (ICHREE) "found reasonable grounds to believe that the Federal Government [of Ethiopia] was using starvation as a method of warfare" in the Tigray Region. They also stated that the Ethiopian government, along with forces allied with them, engaged in deliberate efforts to deny Tigray "access to basic services […] and humanitarian assistance," leaving 90% of Tigrayan residents in dire conditions. It called on both the federal government and the TPLF to let these services resume without hindrance.

In June 2023, the Lowenstein Human Rights Clinic of Yale Law School, in a summary of its 18-month study mostly based on public reports, stated that the Ethiopian federal government and its allies had extensively looted and attacked and blocked supplies of food, water, healthcare, electricity, cash, fuel, and humanitarian relief in Tigray during the war. The Lowenstein report stated that the government and its allies had, by these actions, used starvation as a method of combat, in violation of international humanitarian law, and further called for investigations to determine if these actions constituted war crimes, crimes against humanity or genocide.

=== Effects of the Russian invasion of Ukraine ===
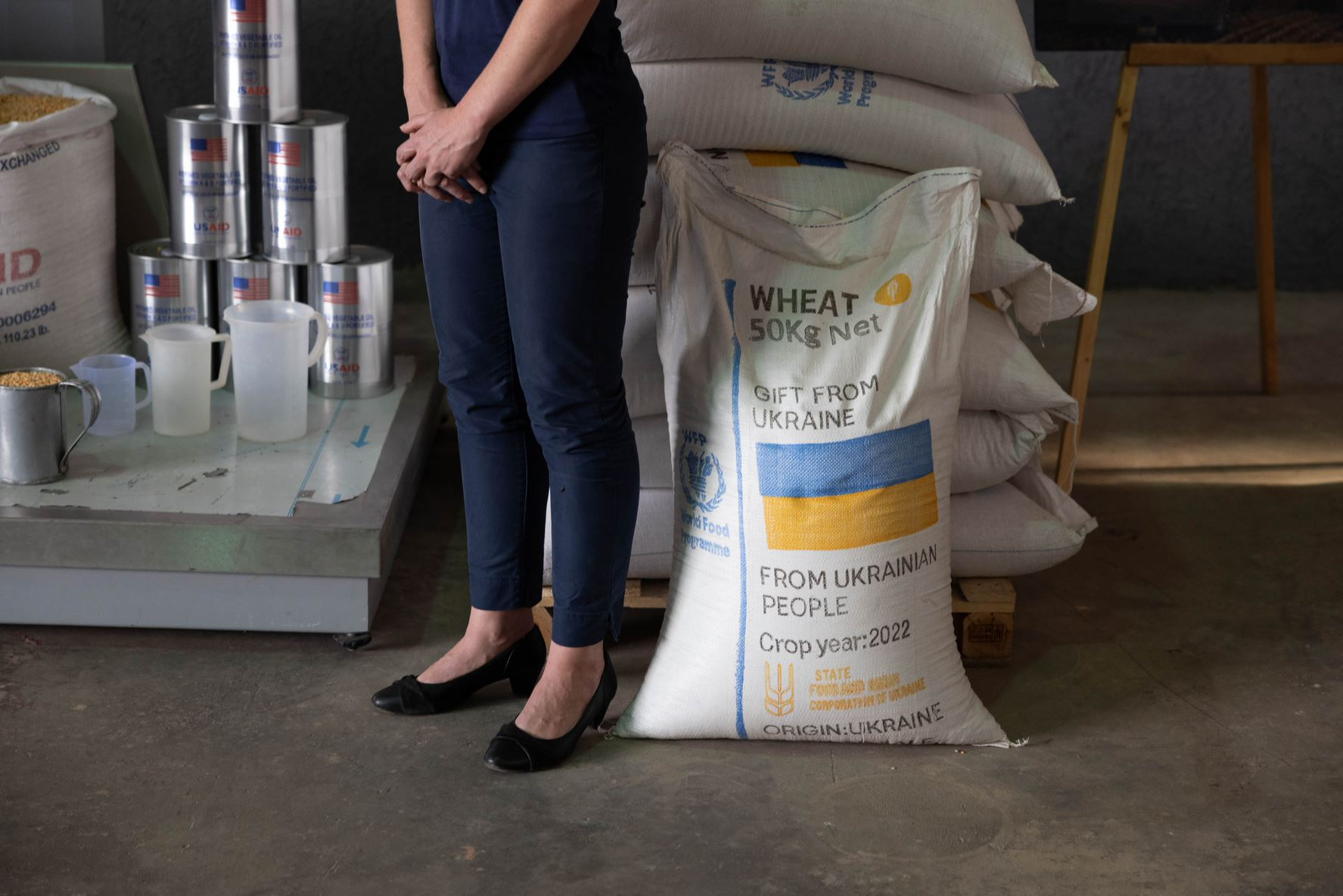
Bags of wheat from Ukraine sent to Ethiopia, March 2023

In 2020, Russia and Ukraine accounted for a combined total of 81% of Ethiopia's wheat imports (66% being imported from the former and 15% from the latter); in June 2022, roughly 42% of Ethiopia's grain was imported from these two countries (15% from Russia and 27% from Ukraine). The Russian invasion of Ukraine in February 2022 exacerbated the already existing food crisis in the country, as it disrupted supply chains and caused food prices to significantly increase.

Ukraine continued to send food aid to Ethiopia even after being invaded; this included a 50,000 tonne shipment of grain to the Horn of Africa region, wherein Ukraine (with support from Germany and France) reimbursed money to Ethiopia and Somalia for the cost of shipping. On 17 November 2022, Ukraine sent another 27,000 tonnes of wheat to Ethiopia.

On 30 October 2022, as part of Black Sea Grain Initiative, a shipment of 40,000 tonnes in grain was originally scheduled to leave a Ukrainian port bound for Ethiopia. Russia suspended its participation from the deal a day before the ship's intended departure, citing a drone attack in Crimea. Russia had previously launched missile strikes on Odesa on 2 May and 23 July 2022, damaging infrastructure needed for either the production or shipment of grain.

== Classification ==
On 7 February 2021, Tufts University researcher Alex de Waal argued that the information blackout from the Tigray Region should not be used to "quibble" over the formal classification of the type of starvation in terms of the Integrated Food Security Phase Classification (IPC) of acute food security, in which the severest classifications are "crisis (phase 3)", "emergency (phase 4)" and "famine (phase 5)". De Waal said that 380,000 people had died of "hunger and violence" during the South Sudanese Civil War, among which only 1% had died in areas classified as being under "famine (phase 5)".

== See also ==
- 1983–1985 famine in Ethiopia
- Famine in Yemen (2016–present)
- Famine in Sudan (2024–present)
- Somali drought (2021–2023)
- Gaza Strip famine
- 2025 hunger crisis in Syria
