= Mohamed Idris (Ethiopian politician) =

Ethiopian politician

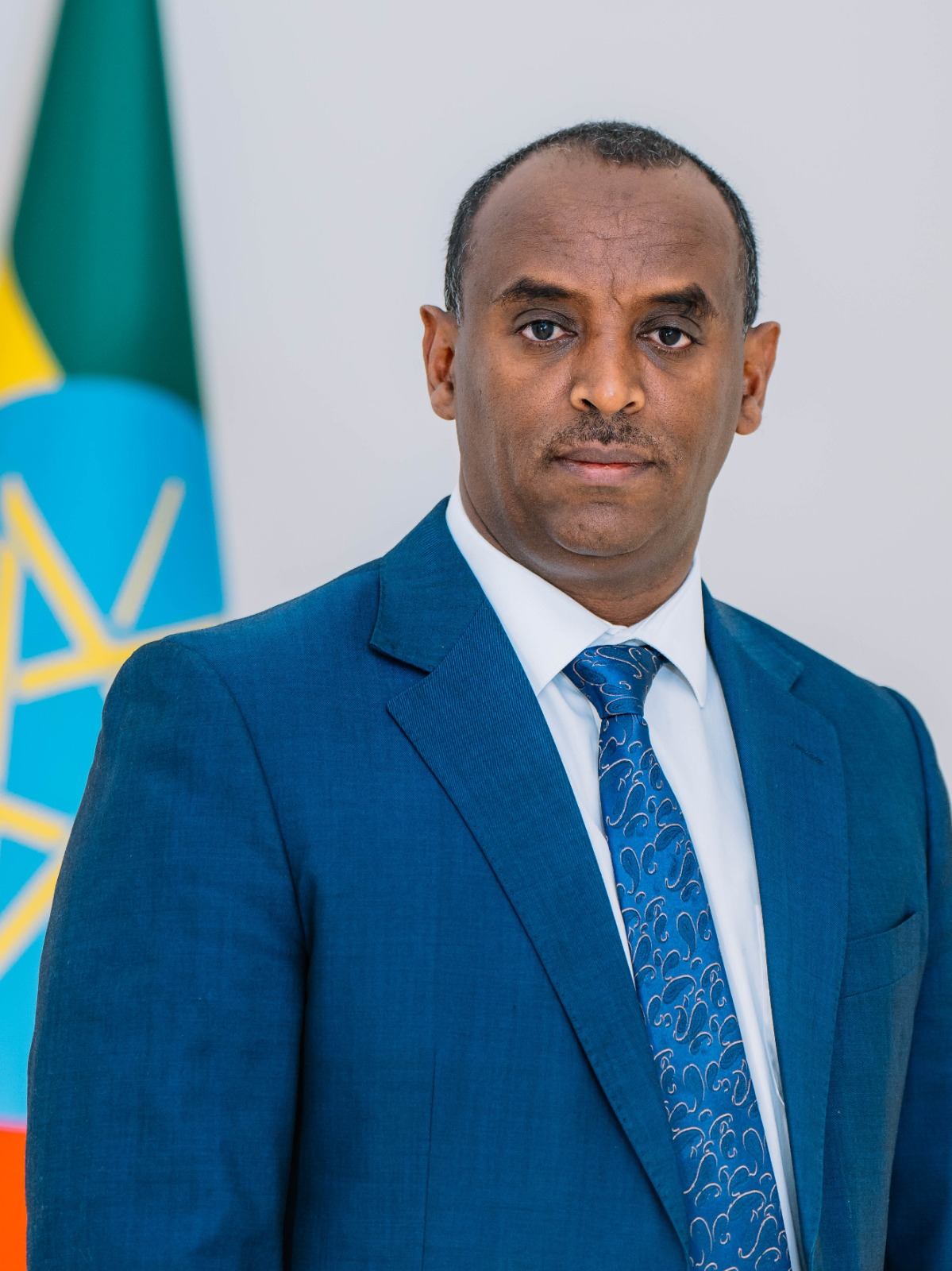

Minister of Peace
- Incumbent
- Assumed office 27 November 2024
- President: Taye Atske Selassie
- Prime Minister: Abiy Ahmed
- Preceded by: Binalf Andualem

Director General of the Ethiopian Broadcast Authority
- In office 5 April 2021 – 27 November 2024
- President: Sahle-Work Zewde; Taye Atske Selassie
- Prime Minister: Abiy Ahmed
- Preceded by: Getachew Dinku

Mohamed Idris (Amharic: ሞሃመድ ኢድሪስ) is an Ethiopian politician who is serving as Minister of Peace since 2024. He was the Director General of Ethiopian Broadcast Authority (EBA) from 2021.
