= Ministry of Public Service =

Ministry of Public Service may refer to:

- Ministry of Public Service (Solomon Islands)
- Ministry of Public Service (Uganda)
- Ministry of Public Service (Zimbabwe)
  - Ministry of Public Service, Labour and Social Welfare, Zimbabwe, replaced the Ministry of Public Service in 2014

== See also ==
- Ministry of Public Service and Human Resource Development (Ethiopia)
