= Ministry of Peace =

Ministry of Peace may refer to:

- Ministry of Peace, one of the ministries in George Orwell's novel Nineteen Eighty-Four
- Ministry of Peace (Ethiopia), an Ethiopian government ministry overseeing intelligence services, police, immigration and peace processes

== See also ==
- Department of Peace, a proposed cabinet-level department in the federal government of the United States
