= Binalf Andualem =

Ethiopian politician

- ብናልፍ አንዷለም
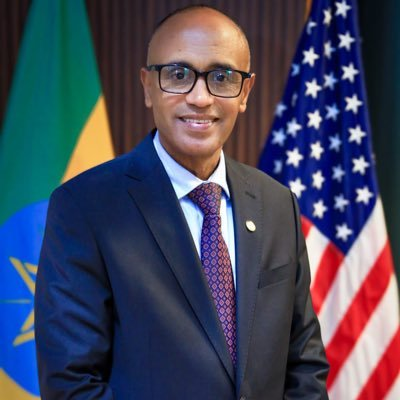

Plenipotentiary Ambassador of Ethiopia to the United States
- Incumbent
- Assumed office 2 December 2024

Minister of Peace
- In office 6 October 2021 – 27 November 2024
- President: Sahle-Work Zewde; Taye Atske Selassie
- Prime Minister: Abiy Ahmed
- Preceded by: Muferiat Kamil
- Succeeded by: Mohamed Idris

Binalf Andualem (Amharic: ብናልፍ አንዷለም) is an Ethiopian politician who is the Plenipotentiary Ambassador of Ethiopia to the United States since 2024. He served as Minister of Peace from 2021 to 2024. Previously, he has been worked as General Coordinator for Democratic System Building Center with the rank of minister from 8 November 2020. During his role of Peace minister, Binalf said his part the new cabinet is inclusive and "this will ensure shared responsibility in bringing prosperity to the country beyond narrowing political differences."
