= Tagesse Chafo =

Ethiopian politician; Speaker of the House of Peoples Representatives since 2018

- ታገሰ ጫፎ
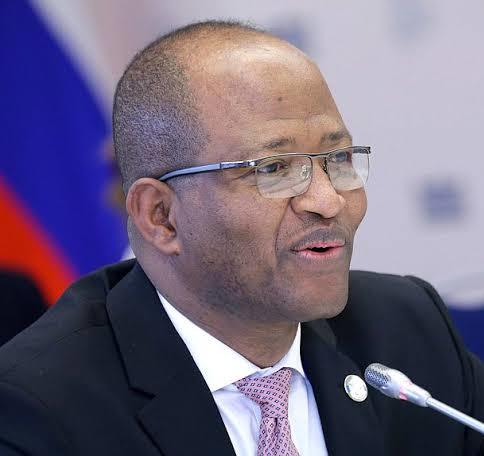
- Tagesse in 2019

Speaker of the House of Peoples' Representatives
- In office 18 October 2018 – 5 October 2026
- Deputy: Lomi Bedo
- Preceded by: Muferiat Kamil
- Succeeded by: Ahmed Shide

Minister for Public Service and Human Resource Development
- In office October 2017 – 15 October 2018
- Succeeded by: Fekadu Tesema

Personal details
- Born: SNNPR, Ethiopia
- Party: Prosperity Party
- Other political affiliations: Ethiopian People's Revolutionary Democratic Front; Southern Ethiopian People's Democratic Movement

Tagesse Chafo (Amharic: ታገሰ ጫፎ) is an Ethiopian politician who served as Speaker of the House of Peoples Representatives from 2018 to 2026. He was elected as speaker on 18 October 2018 succeeding Muferiat Kamil who became the Minister of Peace. He was re-elected as the Speaker of the House of Peoples' Representatives on 4 October 2021.

Prior to becoming Speaker, Tagesse was the Minister for Public Service and Human Resource Development from 2017 to 2018.

== Life and career ==
Tagesse Chafo was born in the Southern Nations, Nationalities and People's Region (SNNPR). He has a Master of Business Administration in senior management from OU Business School in UK and Master of Science & Aquaculture from AMU in India. In addition, he received a Bachelor of Science Degree in Biology from Addis Ababa University.

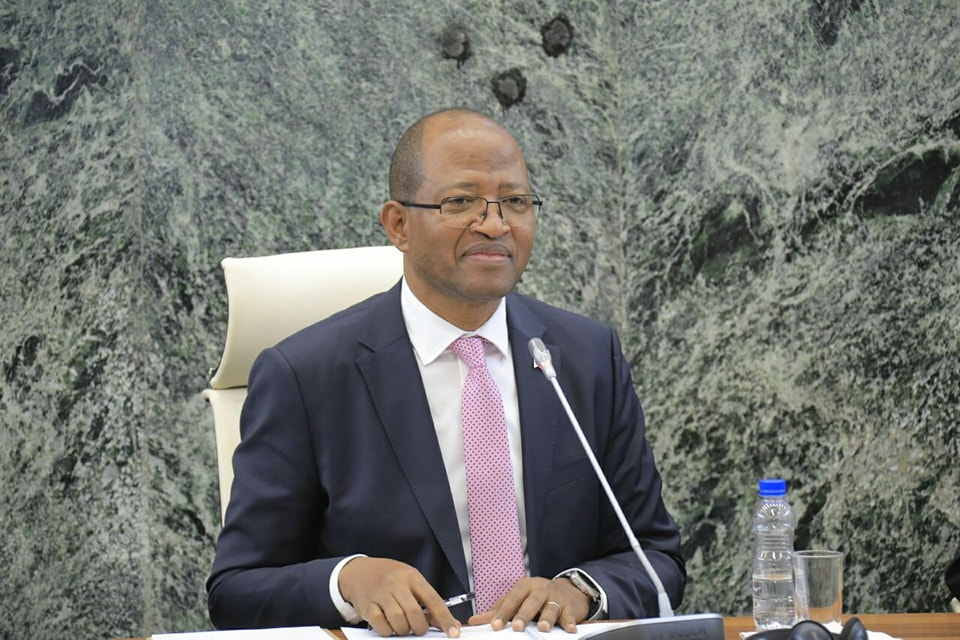
Tagesse during Parliament session on 12 July 2024

He previously served as the Minister for Public Service and Human Resource Development from 2017 to 2018. He also held various positions in SNNPR including Vice President, Head of Investment Commission, Head of Bureau of Trade and Industry Bureau. Additionally, Tagesse also served as a board member and chairman of various institutions like Arba Minch University, Ethiopian Sugar Development Corporation, South Water Works Construction Enterprise and Public Service Social Security Agency.

Tagesso was a member of the Ethiopian People's Revolutionary Democratic Front (EPRDF) and the Southern Ethiopian People's Democratic Movement (SEPDM). During Abiy Ahmed premiership, Tagesso has been a member of Prosperity Party and he was elected as Speaker of the House of Peoples Representatives on 18 October 2018. He was re-elected to the position on 4 October 2021.

== List of administrative positions ==
Source: HOPR
Positions	Date served
Head of District level department of agriculture	February 1994 – August 1997
Head of Province level department of Trade, Industry and Urban Development	December 2002 – September 2005
Head of Investment Commission of SNNP (Southern Nations Nationalities & Peoples') Regional State	October 2005 – November 2006
Head of Bureau of Works and Urban Development SNNP Regional State	December 2006 – April 2008
Vice President of SNNP Regional State and head of Trade & Industry Bureau	May 2008 – December 2012
Vice President of SNNP Regional State and head of Civil Service Bureau	January 2013 – December 2004
State Minister FDRE Policy Study & Research Center	January 2015 – October 2017
Minister for Public Service and Human Resource Development	October 2017 – 15 October 2018
Speaker of the House of Peoples’ Representatives	18 October 2018 – present
