= Speaker of the House of Peoples' Representatives =

Presiding officer over the Ethiopian Parliament's lower house

The speaker of the Ethiopian House of Peoples Representatives is the presiding officer over the House. The current speaker is Tagesse Chafo who succeeded Muferiat Kamil when Kamil was promoted to become the minister of peace.

The inaugural holder of this post was Dawit Yohannes who became speaker in 1995. He left the role in 2005 after serving for 10 years.

== List of speakers of the House of Peoples' Representatives ==
Name	Entered office	Left office
Dawit Yohannes	August 23, 1995	October 10, 2005
Teshome Toga	October 10, 2005	October 3, 2010
Abadula Gemeda	October 4, 2010	April 19, 2018
Muferiat Kamil	April 19, 2018	October 16, 2018
Tagesse Chafo	October 18, 2018	Present
