= ACHPR Tigray investigation =

The ACHPR Tigray Investigation was an African Commission on Human and Peoples' Rights (ACHPR) investigation of human rights violations occurring in the Tigray War including extrajudicial executions of civilians and sexual violence. The ACHPR established the Commission of Inquiry into the Situation in the Tigray Region to carry out the investigation under the ACHPR resolution #482 on 12 May 2021.

== Creation and termination ==
On 12 May 2021, the ACHPR decided to create a commission to investigate human rights violations occurring in the Tigray War, referring to Ethiopia's obligations under articles 45(2) and 46 of the African Charter on Human and Peoples' Rights, principles of non-interference, existing documentation on the human rights violations of the war, and other investigations such as the EHRC–OHCHR Tigray investigation. The Commission of Inquiry into the Situation in the Tigray Region was established for a renewable period of three months, with a mandate to investigate gross human rights violations, including extrajudicial executions of civilians and sexual violence, by collecting evidence, identifying perpetrators, determining the underlying causes, and reporting results and making recommendations to prevent patterns of human rights violations from continuing. In August 2021, the commission was renewed for another three months.

On 23 May 2023, the ACHPR terminated the mandate of the ACHPR Tigray investigation, citing the Ethiopia–Tigray peace agreement as the main reason for the termination.

== Location ==
The commission's headquarters are in Banjul, with the aim of travelling to Ethiopia and "neighbouring countries when conditions are met".

== Leadership and structure ==
Rémy Ngoy Lumbu, vice-chair of the ACHPR, was the chair of the commission. The four other members initially included in the commission were Maya Sahli-Fadel, Hatem Essaiem, Maria Teresa Manuela and Mudford Zachariah Mwandenga.

The commission had the right to co-opt forensic investigation, human rights or other experts as additional members. In August 2021, human rights experts Fatsah Ouguergouz, Soyata Maïga and Lucy Asuagbor were retrospectively appointed as of June 2021.

== Reporting ==
In September 2021, Lumbu stated that the commission's report would be published by the end of 2021. In July 2023, when the May 2023 termination of the investigation's mandate became known to Ethiopian media, Addis Standard, an Ethiopian magazine, stated that the investigation had not been permitted to travel to Tigray Region and had not published a report on its findings.

== See also ==
- EHRC–OHCHR Tigray investigation
- International Commission of Human Rights Experts on Ethiopia
- Commission of Inquiry on Tigray Genocide
