= Lomi Bedo =

Ethiopian politician

Deputy Speaker of the House of Peoples' Representatives
- Incumbent
- Assumed office 4 October 2021
- Speaker: Tagesse Chafo

Personal details
- Party: Prosperity Party
- Occupation: Politician

Lomi Bedo Kumbi is an Ethiopian politician. She has been serving as Deputy Speaker of the House of Peoples' Representatives since 2021.

== Career ==
Bedo was elected and sworn in Deputy Speaker of the House of Peoples' Representatives on 4 October 2021 after the 2021 general election. She is the supervisor of the Women Parliamentary Caucus.

In February 2022, Bedo and Gayo Asherbiri were elected members of the Ethiopian delegation to the Pan African Parliament.

She visited the Parliament of South Africa through a UN Women mission in July 2023. In October 2025, Bedo described Ethiopia's exclusion from access to the Red Sea as a “historic mistake” and called on the citizens to support the Ethiopian government's diplomatic efforts to secure that access to the sea.

In March 2026 she visited India at the head of a delegation of 32 female deputies where she met with Minister Jitendra Singh Rana in New Delhi as part of a training programme on women's leadership organised by the National Centre for Good Governance.
