= Dawit Yohannes =

Ethiopian politician and diplomat (1956–2019)

- ዳዊት ዮሃንስ

Speaker of the House of Peoples' Representatives
- In office 1995 – 9 October 2005
- Succeeded by: Teshome Toga

Permanent Representative to the United Nations
- In office 30 May 2006 – January 2011
- Succeeded by: Abadula Gemeda

Personal details
- Born: 10 October 1956 Addis Ababa
- Died: 28 January 2019 (aged 62) United States
- Education: Addis Ababa University; Georgetown University; University of Amsterdam

Dawit Yohannes (Amharic: ዳዊት ዮሐንስ; 10 October 1956 – 28 January 2019) was the first Speaker of the House of Peoples' Representatives, the lower chamber of the Ethiopian Parliament, from 1995 to 2005. He was also the Permanent Representative to the United Nations.

== Personal life ==
Dawit Yohannes was born in Addis Ababa on 10 October 1956. Dawit attended Addis Ababa University, Georgetown University and Southeastern University. In 2000, Dawit received a Master of Laws from the University of Amsterdam. Dawit was married and has three children. He died on 28 January 2019, aged 62.
