= Steven R. Ratner =

American human rights attorney

Steven R. Ratner is a Bruno Simma Collegiate Professor of Law and the Director, University of Michigan Donia Human Rights Center. He is an expert in human rights, International and Comparative Law and Public Interest Law.

== Education ==
Ratner graduated from Princeton University, Yale University and the Geneva Graduate Institute, in Switzerland.

== International career ==
Ratner was a member of a three-person group appointed by the United Nations Secretary-general to consider about how the Khmer Rouge would be brought to justice. He was a member of a three-member panel of the United Nations's Report of the Secretary-General's Panel of Experts on Accountability in Sri Lanka to investigate war crimes in the final stages of the Sri Lankan Civil War.

Ratner was a member of the International Commission of Human Rights Experts on Ethiopia in 2022 and 2023 that investigated war crimes in the Tigray War and in other parts of Ethiopia.
