= Yikono =

Women's rights group

- Types: voluntary association
- Aim: women's rights
- Location: Tigray Region
- Country: Ethiopia

Yikono (Tigrinya for enough) is a grassroots women's rights group based in Tigray Region in Ethiopia that is opposed to gender-based violence.

== Creation ==
The creation of Yikono was triggered by a November 2019 town hall meeting in Addi Daero in which a woman spoke to the audience about a rape by a policeman 14 years earlier. Two other women claimed at the same meeting that the policeman had had sex with them, promising to marry them. A protest march to support the victims of violence against women was held in Addi Daero, stimulating social debate through Tigray Region. Mekelle youths organised a similar march in Mekelle, the capital of Tigray Region, calling for government and NGO actions to prevent violence against women. An online social media campaign together with the march evolved into Yikono, meaning enough in Tigrinya.

== Leadership ==
Co-founders of Yikono include Weyni Abraha, Tsidena Abadi, Helen Tedros, and Meaza Gidey. Yikono participants include both women and men.

== Aims ==
Yikono aims at gender equality by creating awareness of violence against women and by helping women at risk to re-establish their lives and become financially independent.

== Methods ==
Yikono campaigning is mostly carried out in Tigrinya, the main language spoken in Tigray Region and a major language of Eritrea, discussing sexual harassment and sexual violence issues in the context of the local culture.

== Actions and analyses ==
During the COVID-19 pandemic in Ethiopia, Yikono helped to establish emergency shelters for vulnerable women. One shelter, for up to 50 women and children, was set up on 27 April 2020 by Yikono in cooperation with Mekelle University, the Tigray branch of Organisation for Social Services, Health & Development (OSSHD) and Midre'Genet Elderly Care Centre. As of 9 May, thirteen women and eight children were staying at the shelter. The women were commercial sex workers, cleaners and cooks working in bars and hotels who were unable to pay their rent due to a state of emergency in Tigray Region that banned bars and night clubs.

In February 2021 during the Tigray War, Weyni Abraha of Yikono was interviewed by BBC News on sexual violence in the Tigray War, which she argued was being used as a weapon of war. She stated,

Many women were raped in Mekelle. This is being done purposely to break the morale of the people, threaten them and make them give up the fight.

— Weyni Abraha, February 2021, on BBC News
