= Teshome Toga =

Ethiopian politician

Teshome Toga Chanaka
- ተሾመ ቶጋ

Ambassador to Ghana
- In office 1992–1993

Ambassador to Egypt
- In office 1993–1996

Member of House of Federation
- In office 1995–2010

Ambassador to Kenya and Tanzania
- In office 1996–2001

Speaker of the House of Peoples' Representatives
- In office 10 October 2005 – 3 October 2010
- Preceded by: Dawit Yohannes
- Succeeded by: Abadula Gemeda

Ambassador to Belgium
- In office 2013–2019

Ambassador to China
- In office 2019–present

Personal details
- Born: Teshome Toga Chanaka; 23 April 1968 (age 58) Dimtu, Ethiopia

Teshome Toga Chanaka (Amharic: ተሾመ ቶጋ; born 23 April 1968) is an Ethiopian politician and second Speaker of the House of Peoples' Representatives, the lower chamber of the Ethiopian Parliament, from 2005 to 2010. He was succeeded by Abadula Gemeda.

== Background ==
=== Early life ===
Teshome was born in Dimtu, Ethiopia, and completed his primary education in Bilate Tena Primary school. He was born into a farmer family, and used to help his family after school: by herding cattle and plowing. Teshome completed his secondary school in Sodo. After completing his secondary education, he attended Addis Ababa University in 1987.

=== Political career ===
Teshome has worked in different levels of power from district to regional level in Southern Nations, Nationalities, and Peoples' Region, before becoming the Speaker of the House of Peoples' Representatives. Most of his governmental positions were being an ambassador of Ethiopia in different counties. Being stationed in Ghana (1992–93), Egypt (1993–1996), Kenya and Tanzania (1996–2001), Belgium (2013–2019), and currently in China (2019-)
