= International Commission of Human Rights Experts on Ethiopia =

Human rights monitoring organisation

The International Commission of Human Rights Experts on Ethiopia (ICHREE) was established by the UN Human Rights Council in December 2021. The mandate of the commission is to investigate allegations of violations and abuses of international human rights law, humanitarian law, and refugee law in Ethiopia committed since 3 November 2020 by all parties involved in the ongoing Ethiopian civil war. The Commission comprises three human rights experts and is appointed for a renewable one-year term. In October 2022 at the Human Rights Council's 51st session, the Commission's mandate was extended to October 2023. The last report published by this group was in October 2023.

== Creation, aims and termination ==
On 3 November 2021, the report of the joint investigation undertaken by the UN High Commissioner for Human Rights and the Ethiopian Human Rights Commission indicated that serious human rights violations had continued to be committed by all parties in a number of regions of Ethiopia since the end of the period under investigation, that is after the unilateral ceasefire declared by the Ethiopian government on 28 June 2021; hence the need for further investigations.

On 17 December 2021, the United Nations Human Rights Council reacted to that report by adopting resolution S-33/1. The resolution established the International Commission of Human Rights Experts on Ethiopia (ICHREE) with the aim of complementing the work of the joint investigative team. ICHREE's mandate includes conducting an impartial investigation into allegations of violations and abuses of international human rights law, humanitarian law and refugee law in Ethiopia committed since 3 November 2020 by all parties to the conflict, providing guidance on transitional justice, and making recommendations to the Government of Ethiopia while engaging with all relevant stakeholders.

The Ethiopian federal government twice made United Nations General Assembly proposals to stop funding ICHREE.

In October 2022, the Human Rights Council renewed the mandate of ICHREE to continue to monitor and document crimes under international law and human rights violations.

During a session of the Human Rights Council in late 2023, ICHREE members requested the HRC to extend ICHREE's mandate, stating that the Eritrean Defence Forces continued to rape and enslave women in Tigray, and that extrajudicial executions and mass detentions were ongoing in Amhara Region. ICHREE member Steven R. Ratner stated, "There is a very real and imminent risk that the situation will deteriorate further, and it is incumbent upon the international community to ensure that investigations persist so human rights violations can be addressed, and the worst tragedies averted." An EU diplomat stated that the EU had agreed to led the mandate expire. As of 4 October 2023, the mandate was expected to expire, as no proposal to extend the mandate had been made by the required deadline.

== Members and structure ==
ICHREE is composed by three experts. The most recent members were Mohamed Chande Othman from Tanzania (Chair), Steven R. Ratner from the United States of America, and Radhika Coomaraswamy from Sri Lanka. Former members are Kaari Betty Murungi from Kenya (Chair) and Fatou Bensouda from Gambia.

== Actions ==
=== September 2022 report ===
On 19 September 2022, ICHREE submitted a report with its initial findings to the Human Rights Council, and published an updated version on 5 October 2022. According to the report, there were grounds to believe that extrajudicial killings, sexual violence and starvation of the civilian population as a method of warfare had been committed in Ethiopia since 3 November 2020.

In attributing likely criminal responsibility to the different parties in the conflict, the September 2022 report "found reasonable grounds to believe that the Federal Government (of Ethiopia) and its allies had committed crimes against humanity" and that the Ethiopian government and its allies had used famine as a weapon of war. The report attributed serious human rights abuses to the Tigrayan forces, some of which were likely war crimes.

Ethiopia's UN ambassador, Taye Atske Selassie, said that the report was "incoherent and sketchy" and was intended to increase political pressures against his government.

=== March 2023 statement ===
At the March 2023 52nd Session of the Human Rights Council, the chair of the ICHREE said that it welcomed the Ethiopia–Tigray peace agreement and hoped that a green paper titled "Policy Options for Transitional Justice" would contribute to the processes of transitional justice. The chair stated that the ICHREE was continuing to investigate war crimes and human rights violations by all parties, including Eritrean forces. The chair stated that the ICHREE had requested access for its investigation team to Ethiopian territory several times and had been refused. The chair stated that the ICHREE was in contact with the Ethiopian Human Rights Commission and the East Africa Region Office of the United Nations High Commissioner for Human Rights for "cooperation and information sharing".

=== September/October 2023 reports ===
ICHREE published a 21-page report in September 2023 and an 84-page report in October 2023. The latter report details human rights violations in the Tigray, Amhara, Afar, and Oromia regions of Ethiopia since November 3, 2020. It also discusses the ways in which the Tigray People's Liberation Front (TPLF) and the federal government have not held to all the terms of the Cessation of Hostilities Agreement (CoHA) that they signed in November 2022.

== See also ==
- Ethiopian civil conflict (2018-present)
- Ethiopian Human Rights Commission
- Famine in the Tigray War
- History of Ethiopia
- Investigations:
  - EHRC–OHCHR Tigray investigation
  - ACHPR Tigray investigation
- Sexual violence in the Tigray War
- War crimes in the Tigray War
