= Muferiat Kamil =

Ethiopian politician (born 1976)

Muferihat Kamil
- ሙፈሪሃት ካሚል
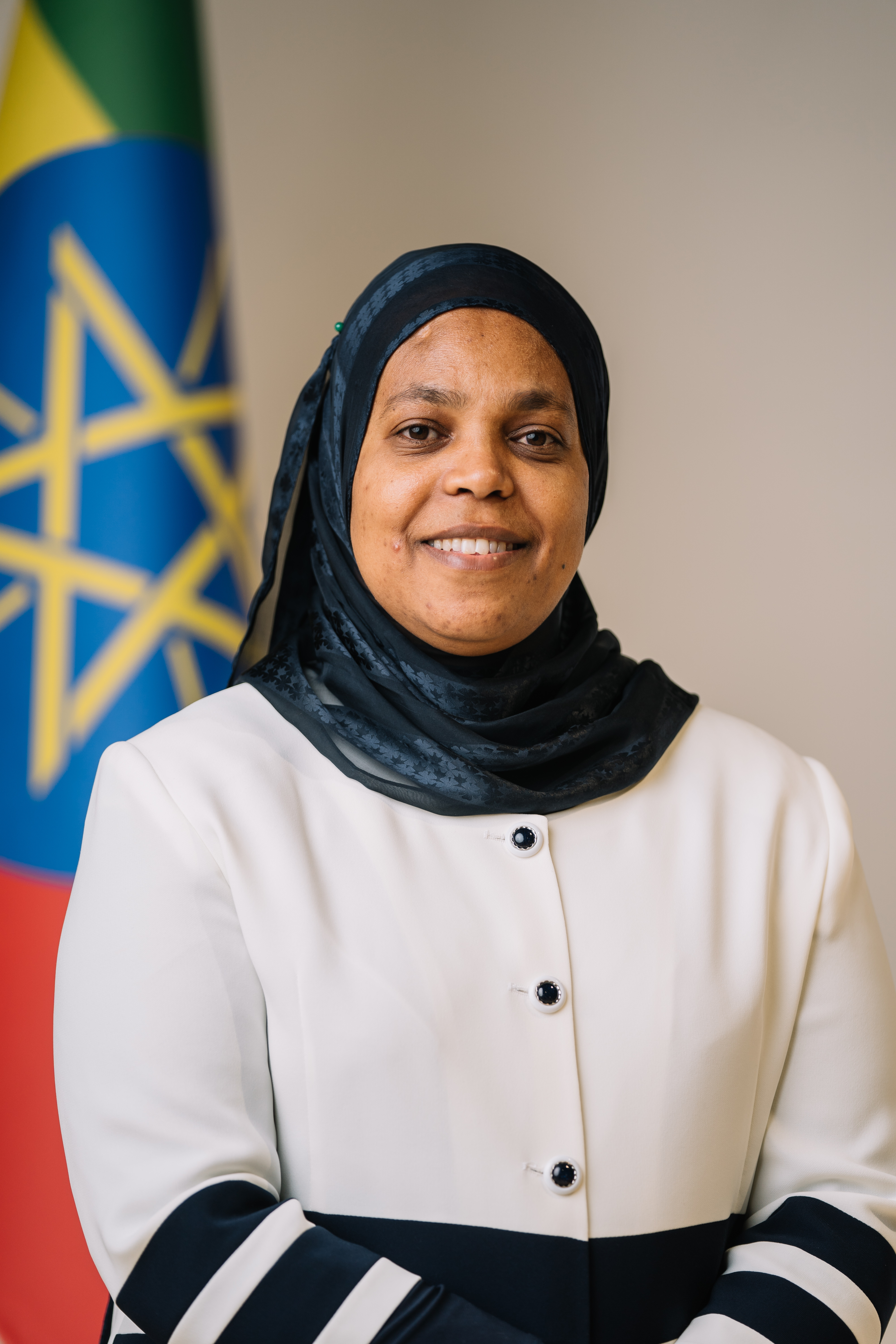

Minister of Labour and Skills Development
- Incumbent
- Assumed office 6 October 2021
- President: Sahle-Work Zewde; Taye Atske Selassie
- Prime Minister: Abiy Ahmed
- Preceded by: Ergoge Tesfaye

Minister of Peace
- In office 16 October 2018 – 6 October 2021
- President: Mulatu Teshome; Sahle-Work Zewde
- Prime Minister: Abiy Ahmed
- Preceded by: Post established
- Succeeded by: Binalf Andualem

Speaker of the House of Peoples' Representatives
- In office 19 April 2018 – 16 October 2018
- Preceded by: Abadula Gemeda
- Succeeded by: Tagesse Chafo

Leader of the Southern Ethiopian People's Democratic Movement
- In office 25 June 2018 – 1 December 2019
- Deputy: Million Mathewos
- Preceded by: Shiferaw Shigute
- Succeeded by: post abolished

Personal details
- Born: 1976 (age 49–50)
- Party: Prosperity Party
- Other political affiliations: Ethiopian People's Revolutionary Democratic Front; Southern Ethiopian People's Democratic Movement

Muferihat Kamil Ahmed (Amharic: ሙፈሪሃት ካሚል አሕመድ, mufärihat kamil ähmäd; born 1976) is an Ethiopian politician who is the current Minister of Labour and Skills Development since 2021. She was the Speaker of the House of Peoples' Representatives. Muferihat previously served as the first Minister of Peace from October 2018 to 6 October 2021. She was the Chair of the SEPDM (Southern Ethiopian People's Democratic Movement), one of the four parties that make up the former ruling coalition in Ethiopia, the EPRDF.

== Early life ==
Muferihat was born in Jimma to ethnic Silt’e parents, one of southern Ethiopian peoples. She is a Sunni Muslim. She attended Haramaya University, obtaining her BSc in Agriculture in 2000.

== Political career ==
Muferihat was appointed Public Relations Advisor to the Southern Nations, Nationalities and Peoples' Region (SNNPR) President in 2007. She was named as Minister of Women's Affairs of Ethiopia in 2008. She was named as Speaker of the House of Peoples' Representatives in April 2018, making her the first female to hold the post.

In October 2018, Muferihat was appointed Minister of Peace, a powerful ministry overseeing agencies including the National Intelligence and Security Service (NISS), the Information Network Security Agency (INSA), and the Federal Police Commission.
