= House of Peoples' Representatives =

Lower house of the Ethiopian parliament

Name in national languages
- - Amharic: የሕዝብ ተወካዮች ምክር ቤት; Ye-Hizib Tewekayochi Mikir Bēt
  - Oromo: Manni Maree Bakka Bu'oota Ummataa
  - Somali: Golaha Wakiilada Shacabka
  - Tigrinya: ቤት ምኽሪ ተወከልቲ ህዝቢ; Bēt Mkhri Tewekelti Hzbi
  - Afar: Ummattah Awlaytiitih Malah Buxa
- 6th Ethiopian Parliament
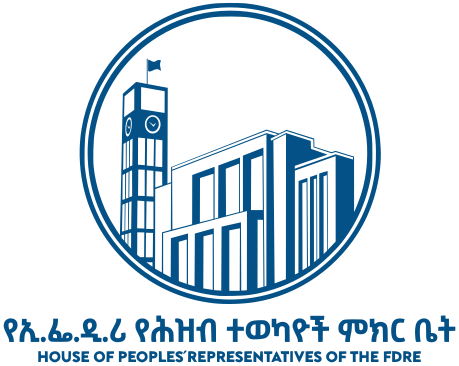
- Logo of the House

Type
- Type: Lower house of the Federal Parliamentary Assembly
- Term limits: None

History
- Founded: August 1995
- Preceded by: National Shengo
- New session started: 4 October 2021

Leadership
- Speaker: Tagesse Chafo, Prosperity since 18 October 2018
- Deputy Speaker: Lomi Bedo, Prosperity since 4 October 2021
- Prime Minister: Abiy Ahmed, Prosperity since 2 April 2018

Structure
- Seats: 547
- Political groups: Government (457): Prosperity (457); Opposition (15): NaMA (5); EZEMA (4); GPDO (2); Independent (4); Vacant (74): Vacant (74)
- Length of term: 5 years

Elections
- Voting system: First-past-the-post
- First election: 7–18 May 1995
- Last election: 1 June 2026
- Next election: 2031

Meeting place
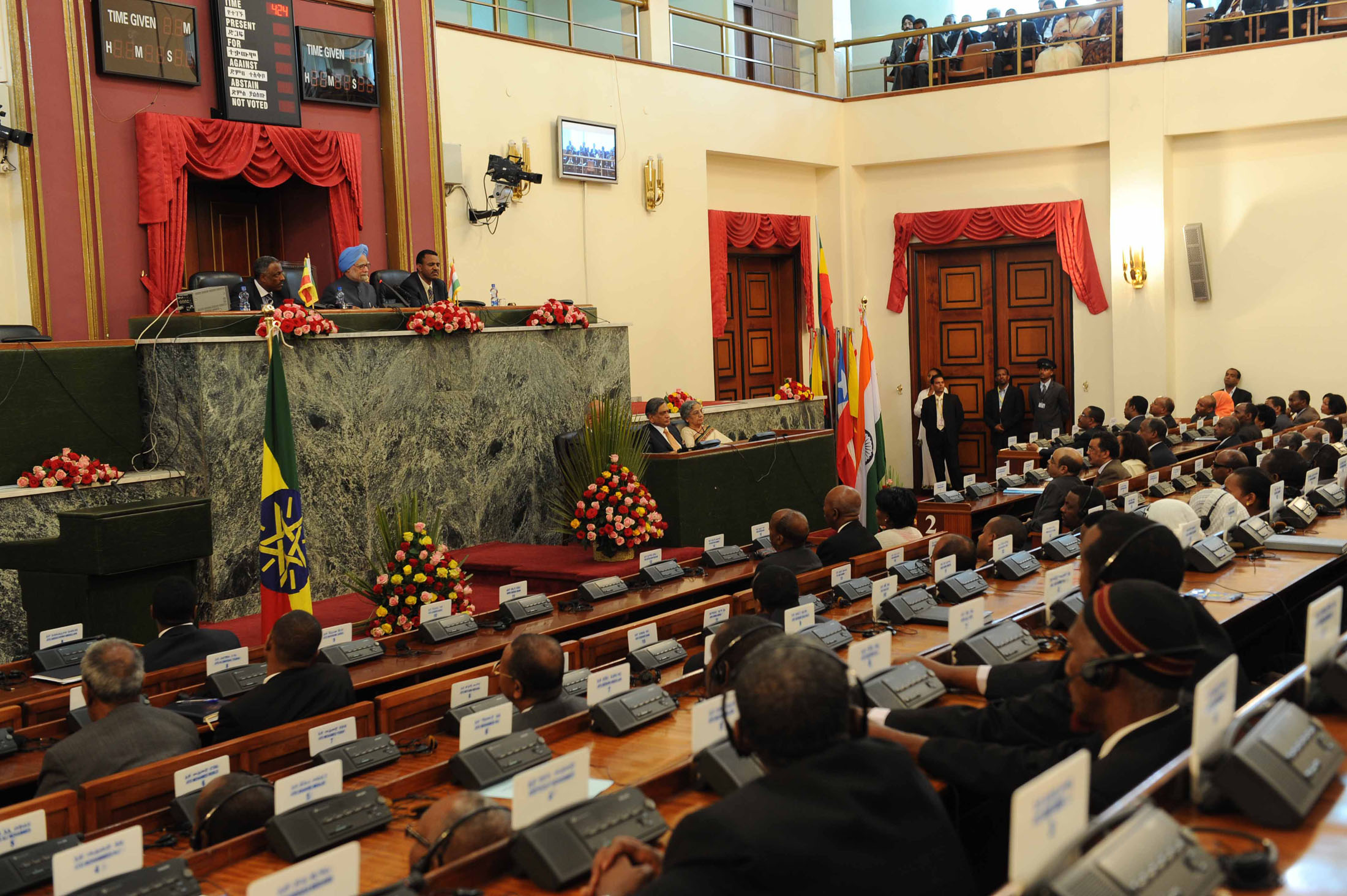
- Ethiopian Parliament Building; Addis Ababa, Ethiopia; 9.0301235°N 38.7623748°E

Website
- www.hopr.gov.et

Constitution
- Constitution of Ethiopia

The House of Peoples' Representatives is the lower house of the Ethiopian Federal Parliamentary Assembly. Located in the capital Addis Ababa, the House has 547 members. All are elected in theory for five-year term in single-seat constituencies. The proceedings in the chamber are led by Speaker of the House of Peoples' Representatives. Of the 547 seats, 74 are vacant.

== History ==
In 1995, Ethiopia's ethnic federalism system was set up, with a bicameral federal parliamentary assembly, of which the lower chamber with not more than 550 members as per the constitution. 22 of the 547 seats were reserved for representatives of minority nationalities.

== Speakers of the House of Peoples' Representatives ==
The Speaker of the House of Peoples' Representatives is the presiding officer of the house of peoples representatives.

Name	Entered office	Left office
Dawit Yohannes	August 23, 1995	October 10, 2005
Teshome Toga	October 10, 2005	October 3, 2010
Abadula Gemeda	October 4, 2010	April 19, 2018
Muferiat Kamil	April 19, 2018	October 16, 2018
Tagesse Chafo	October 18, 2018	Present

== See also ==
- House of Federation (upper house of the Federal Assembly)
