= Abadula Gemeda =

Ethiopian politician (born 1958)

- አባዱላ ገመዳ

National Security Advisor of Prime Minister of Ethiopia
- In office 20 April 2018 – 7 June 2018

Speaker of the House of Peoples' Representatives
- In office 10 September 2010 – 19 April 2018
- Preceded by: Teshome Toga
- Succeeded by: Muferiat Kamil

President of Oromia Region
- In office 6 October 2005 – 5 September 2010
- Preceded by: Junedin Sado
- Succeeded by: Alemayehu Atomsa

Minister of Defence
- In office 16 October 2001 – 2005
- Preceded by: Tefera Walwa
- Succeeded by: Kuma Demeksa

Personal details
- Born: Minase Woldegiyorgis; 5 July 1958 (age 66); Arsi Province, Ethiopia (now Oromia Region, Ethiopia)
- Political party: Oromo People's Democratic Organization

Abadula Gemeda (Oromo: Abbaa Duulaa Gammadaa; Amharic: አባዱላ ገመዳ; born 5 July 1958) is an Ethiopian politician who was the speaker of the House of Peoples' Representatives, the lower chamber of the Ethiopian Parliament, from 2010 to 2018. Previously, from 2005 to 2010, he was President of the Oromia Region. He was succeeded in that position by Alemayehu Atomsa.

== Life ==
Abadula Gemeda was born Minase Woldegiorgis in Arsi Zone, Oromia Region, on 5 July 1958. The name Abadula Gemeda is a pseudonym or 'nom de guerre' he obtained at some point during his life. Abbaa Duulaa is his aristocratic horse name, a traditional title of the Oromo people.

Abadula has a mix of military and civilian education. His military education was obtained from the Defense University of China in Military Leadership in 1995. His civilian education was focused on public administration. His Bachelor and Master's of Arts degrees from the US were both obtained from Century University in 2001 and 2004, respectively. Abadula also obtained his master's degree from Greenwich University, UK, in 2009.

== Political career ==
With the change in government in 1991, Abadula became the chief of operations of the National Defense Force. After five years of service, he became the chief of intelligence in 1996. He was appointed as commander of the ground force of the National Defense Force in 1998. He reached the rank of major general. On 16 October 2001, he was appointed as Minister of National Defense. Moving to a civilian profile, Abadula became President of the Oromia Region in 2005.

Abadula is considered one of the few influential politicians within the OPDO. In 2010 he became Speaker of the House of Representatives. He resigned on 7 October 2017; the Addis Standard reported that it was in protest of Federal government's handling of clashes surrounding the boundary dispute between the Oromo and Somali regions. However he later withdrew his resignation after consultations in this government, remaining in office until April 2018 when he was replaced by Muferiat Kamil.

Immediately thereafter he was appointed National Security Advisor. His tenure was however short-lived; he was "honourably retired" in June 2018 less than two months after being named to the post.
