= Ministry of Public Service and Human Resource Development (Ethiopia) =

Government ministry of Ethiopia

Agency overview
- Formed: 2008; 18 years ago
- Jurisdiction: Ethiopian government
- Headquarters: Addis Ababa, Ethiopia
- Minister responsible: Fekadu Tesema
- Website: bishoftu.gov.et/office/public-service-and-human-resource-development-office

The Ministry of Public Service and Human Resource Development (MPSHRD) is an Ethiopian government department responsible for administration and management of civil servants, providing training and improvement opportunities. It was established in 2008 under Proclamation No.916/2008.

== Overview ==
The ministry was established in 2008 under Proclamation No.916/2008. The ministry's head is appointed by the Prime Minister and approved by the House of Peoples' Representatives (HoPR). Fekadu Tesema has been the current minister since 6 October 2021 upon Abiy Ahmed's cabinet reshuffle.
