= Sexual violence in the Tigray war =

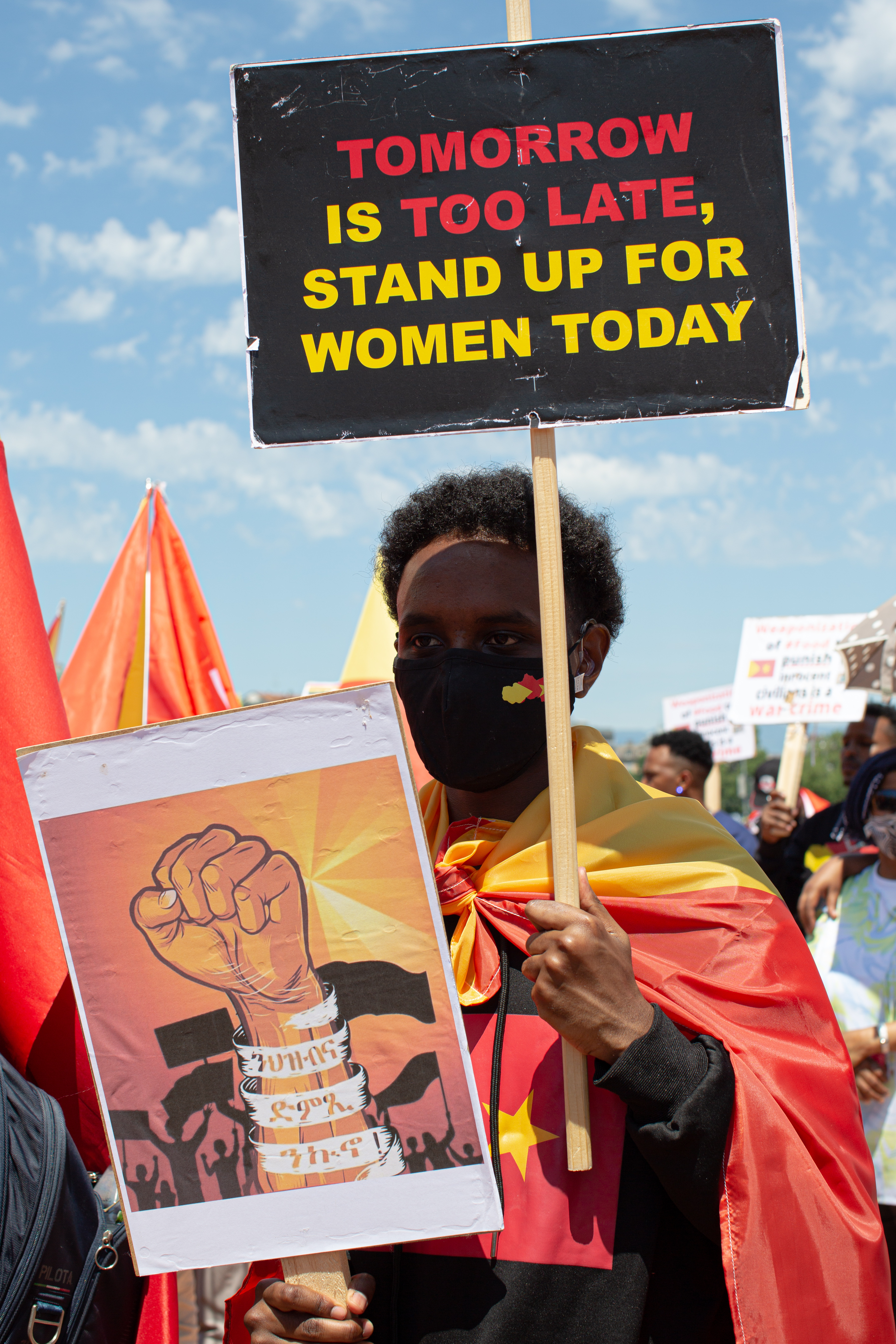
Protestor holding sign in support of women in Tigray

Sexual violence in the Tigray War included, according to the United Nations Special Representative on Sexual Violence in Conflict, Pramila Patten, people forced to rape family members, "sex in exchange for basic commodities", and "increases in the demand for emergency contraception and testing for sexually transmitted infections".

As of August 2021, the number of rape victims ranged from a minimum estimate of 512–516 rapes registered with hospitals in early 2021 to 10,000 rapes, according to British parliamentarian Helen Hayes, and 26,000 women needing sexual and gender-based violence services, according to the United Nations Population Fund. Several claims have been made implicating both sides of the conflict in the systematic use of rape as a weapon of war against the civilian population.

A survey estimated that, over the course of the conflict, around 1 in 10 women in Tigray were subjected to sexual violence, 8 in 100 were subjected to rape, and 4 in 100 were subjected to gang rape. Nails, screws, plastic rubbish and other foreign bodies were forced into reproductive organs of woman, in what was seen as part of a wider effort to destroy fertility of women in Tigray.

== Background ==
The Tigray War commenced in November 2020 in the context of political conflict between the federal government of Ethiopia and the regional government of the Tigray Region, with the Eritrean Defence Forces (EDF) participating on the side of the Ethiopian National Defense Force (ENDF).

== Claims of intent ==
In February 2021, Weyni Abraha from Yikono, a Tigrayan women's rights group, viewed the sexual violence during the Tigray War as a deliberate pattern of rape as a weapon of war, stating, in February 2021, "This is being done purposely to break the morale of the people, threaten them and make them give up the fight."

In March 2021, The Daily Telegraph argued that testimonies showed that rape had been weaponized, stating that "survivors, doctors, aid workers and experts speaking to the Telegraph all pointed to rape being systematically used as a weapon of war by Ethiopian and Eritrean forces." Reasons for the rape that were stated to the victims included the aim of "cleansing Tigrayan blood."

In March 2021, nine doctors of medicine in Ethiopia and one in a Sudanese refugee camp interviewed by CNN, sexual violence in the Tigray War constituted rape as a weapon of war. The women treated by the doctors stated that the ENDF, EDF, and Amhara soldiers who raped them described Tigrayans as having no history and culture, that the intent was to "ethnically cleans[e] Tigray," to "Amharise" them or remove their Tigrayan identity and "blood line." One of the doctors, Tedros Tefera, stated, "Practically this has been a genocide."

In April 2021, Mark Lowcock, the head of OCHA, told the United Nations Security Council that "sexual violence is being used as a weapon of war in Ethiopia's Tigray region, where girls as young as eight are being targeted and some women have reported being gang-raped over several days."

In November 2021, The Globe and Mail reported that evidence gathered suggests that the Tigray Defense Forces (TDF) were using rape as a weapon of war during its occupation of the Amhara Region.

In January 2022, Amnesty International published a report stating that acts of rape and violence by the TDF in the Amhara Region "may have been committed as part of a systematic attack against the Amhara civilian population."

In March 2022, the Ethiopian Human Rights Commission published a report stating that the TDF committed widespread and systematic acts of sexual violence against women and girls in the Afar and Amhara regions.

In September 2022, the International Commission of Human Rights Experts on Ethiopia published a report stating that sexual violence has been perpetrated "on a staggering scale" since the onset of the hostilities in November 2020.

== January 2021 ==
On 4 January 2021, Europe External Programme with Africa (EEPA) reported that large numbers of women had been sexually abused and raped individually or in acts of gang rape. EEPA stated that many women in Mekelle, the capital of Tigray Region, requested emergency contraceptive pills, and that women had been kidnapped by security forces and their places of detention were unknown.

On 21 January, the United Nations Special Representative on Sexual Violence in Conflict, Pramila Patten, brought attention to sexual violence in the Tigray War. She expressed "great concern" at claims of rape in Mekelle, people forced to rape family members, "sex in exchange for basic commodities", and "increases in the demand for emergency contraception and testing for sexually transmitted infections". Patten expressed appreciation of investigations and reports made by the Ethiopian Human Rights Commission and willingness of United Nations agencies to support Ethiopian authorities in "prevent[ing] and respond[ing] to possible violations".

On 23 January, Reuters published an interview with a Tigrayan refugee who claimed that she had been raped at gunpoint by a soldier dressed in an ENDF uniform who stated that a condom was unnecessary. Aid workers and doctors described multiple reports of rape by Amhara and EDF security forces in towns including Rawyan, Wukro, Adigrat and Mekelle.

On 25 January, the United Nations Office for the Coordination of Humanitarian Affairs (UNOCHA) reported "an alarming increase in reports of sexual violations and abuses in Tigray Region, including rape cases," mostly by "men in uniform".

On 30 January, in a speech made by Debretsion Gebremichael, the deposed leader of the Tigray Region, elected in September 2020 and deposed in the war, stated that "Mothers and daughters [were] being raped side by side", attributing the rapes to "the enemies".

== February 2021 ==
On 1 February, EEPA reported that six young girls raped by the ENDF in Mekelle were threatened not to report the rape or seek medical care. A local doctor claimed that EDF and ENDF soldiers shot people who witnessed or tried to help women who were victims of rape in Aksum and as a result residents stopped reacting to women crying for help. According to EEPA, the ENDF soldiers justified the rape on the grounds that "[the girls]' father is Dr. Debretsion and [the soldiers father]' is Dr. Abiy. We are not all the same." Women in a mill house were raped in kebele 17 of Mekelle after ENDF soldiers scared away the men; and 18 and 20-year-old women were raped in the Ayder area of Mekelle, according to EEPA.

On 15 February, BBC News reported a doctor and a women's rights activist together having registered 200 girls under the age of 18 testifying as rape victims at Mekelle health centres and hospitals. An 18-year old schoolgirl interviewed by BBC News described how she had survived a rape attempt, but the assaulter shot her hand three times, forcing a doctor to amputate it when she later arrived at a hospital in Mekelle.

On 28 February, 11 women studying at the Ayder Hospital in Mekelle were raped by the ENDF while en route from the library to their dormitories. They were treated in the hospital after the event.

== March 2021 ==
As of early March, Adigrat hospital had registered 170 women treated for sexual violence, with a trend towards a worsening rate of incidents.

Individual incidents reported in early March include a 15-year-old raped by the ENDF in Shire in front of forced witnesses including her brother; a woman in Kerseber (north of Adigrat) who was gang-raped twice and unable to walk when she arrived at a hospital; women in the outer parts of Mekelle were kidnapped for several weeks by soldiers, serving as forced domestic workers and sex slaves; a woman in outer Mekelle was raped nightly by the ENDF for a week before obtaining medical treatment.

One incident included six women gang-raped by the EDF for 10 days. One of the six women stated to Channel 4 that the Eritrean soldiers joked, took photos, "injected her with a drug, tied her to a rock, stripped, stabbed and [repeatedly raped] her." Another woman's vagina was "stuffed with nails, stones and plastic."

The rapes included men being forced to rape family members.

== August–September 2021 ==
From 12 to 21 August, during the TDF occupation of Nefas Mewcha, 16 women were raped by TDF fighters according to individual interviews conducted by Amnesty International, with 71 or 73 women raped altogether according to official reports. The TDF also looted and destroyed medical facilities in Nefas Mewcha. The identification as TDF fighters was based on accents, ethnic slurs and the fighters' own statements. One of the commanders who raped a victim, Hamelmal, described the rape as revenge, stating, "Amhara is a donkey, Amhara has massacred our people [Tigrayans], the Federal Defense forces have raped my wife, now we can rape you as we want."

In late August/early September, in Filakit Gereger, a 12-year-old girl interviewed by The Globe and Mail stated that she had been raped by four Tigrayan soldiers for "hours" in the presence of her father; a 14-year-old girl was raped by five or six uniformed Tigray soldiers. Witnesses estimated that "dozens" of girls and women had been raped by the Tigrayan soldiers, and that the Tigrayan forces had raped girls and women successively in several villages. The Globe and Mail stated that "the interviews were obtained independently, without the involvement of government officials".

Between 31 August and 4 September, while the TDF occupied of the village of Chenna Teklehaymanot and adjacent areas in Dabat district, at least 30 women and girls were raped and sexually assaulted by TDF soldiers. Victims described being forced to cook for the fighters, beatings, death threats, and ethnic slurs.

== Numbers ==
In late March 2021, the total number of rapes recorded for the Tigray War at five medical facilities in Mekelle, Adigrat, Wukro, Shire and Aksum was 512–516. Wafaa Said, a United Nations aid coordinator, expected the true number of rapes to be much higher because most medical facilities had were not functioning and because of stigma associated with rape. A doctor at a Mekelle hospital said that each rape victim typically reported 20 other women having been raped with her, who would not report the rape to any hospital.

On 25 March 2021, British parliamentarian Helen Hayes stated that 10,000 women had been raped in the Tigray War.

By mid-April 2021, Dr Fasika Amdeselassie, the top public health official in the Transitional Government of Tigray, stated that at least 829 cases of sexual assault had been reported at five active hospitals since the conflict in Tigray began and that the reported cases were likely to be "the tip of the iceberg".

In July 2021, the United Nations Population Fund (UNFPA) estimated that 26,000 women in the 15–49 years age range would need services for sexual and gender based violence in the Tigray War. Support services provided as of mid-June 2021 included the training of 13000 girls and young women and 34 social workers in "psychosocial support and gender-based violence referral pathways", financial support for 30 survivors, providing a mapping tool of mental health and psychosocial support services and training health care providers in psychosocial first aid.

According to the International Commission of Human Rights Experts on Ethiopia, the number of Tigrayan victims of sexual violence could be much higher than the reported figure of "more than 1,000 women and girls."

A 'randomised surveying conducted by BMJ found that about 10% of Tigray's women were subjected to sexual violence. About 70% of those were gang-raped.'

== Investigations ==
On 31 January 2021, Filsan Abdi, the federal Ethiopian Minister of Women, Children and Youth (MoWCY), stated in response to Debretsion Gebremichael's reference to sexual violence during the Tigray War that the federal government "had a zero-tolerance policy towards any form of sexual violence". A task force from MoWCY, together with the Attorney General Adanech Abebe and defence personnel, was set up to investigate sexual violence in the Tigray War. The task force arrived in Mekelle on 1 February to interview victims, collect medical evidence and aid the victims. On 11 February, Filsan confirmed that the task force had "established [that] rape [had] taken place conclusively and without a doubt". She stated that police were processing the "data in terms of numbers", making no statement about attribution. Agence France Presse (AFP) stated that many women had attributed the rapes to the EDF.

Sehin Teferra, a feminist who co-founded Setaweet, described the minister's acknowledgment of rape occurring in the Tigray War as "a big thing". She stated that the rape was "happening on a large scale" and that Setaweet was aware of the rapes by the EDF from firsthand reports. She stated that some families in Tigray were shaving their daughters' heads and dressing them in boys' clothes to protect them from rape. She called for the authorities to also pay attention to sexual violence in the Metekel conflict.

In September 2021, Filsan resigned from her ministership. In December 2021, she stated that "an official very high up in Abiy's office" had blocked publication of the task force's full report, and that she "had been told" to only include rapes by TPLF-associated fighters in the report. Her 11 February 2021 tweet had been a response to the blocking of the full report's publication. Filsan stated that rapes committed in the Amhara and Afar Regions during the late 2021 TDF–OLA joint offensive would have been less likely if there had been accountability for the rapes that occurred in Tigray Region. Her view was that as a result of not publishing the full report, "both sides felt they could just get away with it."

On October 16, 2025, the Commission of Inquiry on Tigray Genocide (CITG) published a report entitled "War-Induced Genocidal Sexual and Gender-Based Violence in Tigray, Ethiopia" based on interviews with more than 480,000 women who experienced violence in northern Ethiopia between 2020 and 2022.
