= Ministry of Peace (Ethiopia) =

Ethiopian government department

- ሰላም ሚኒስቴር
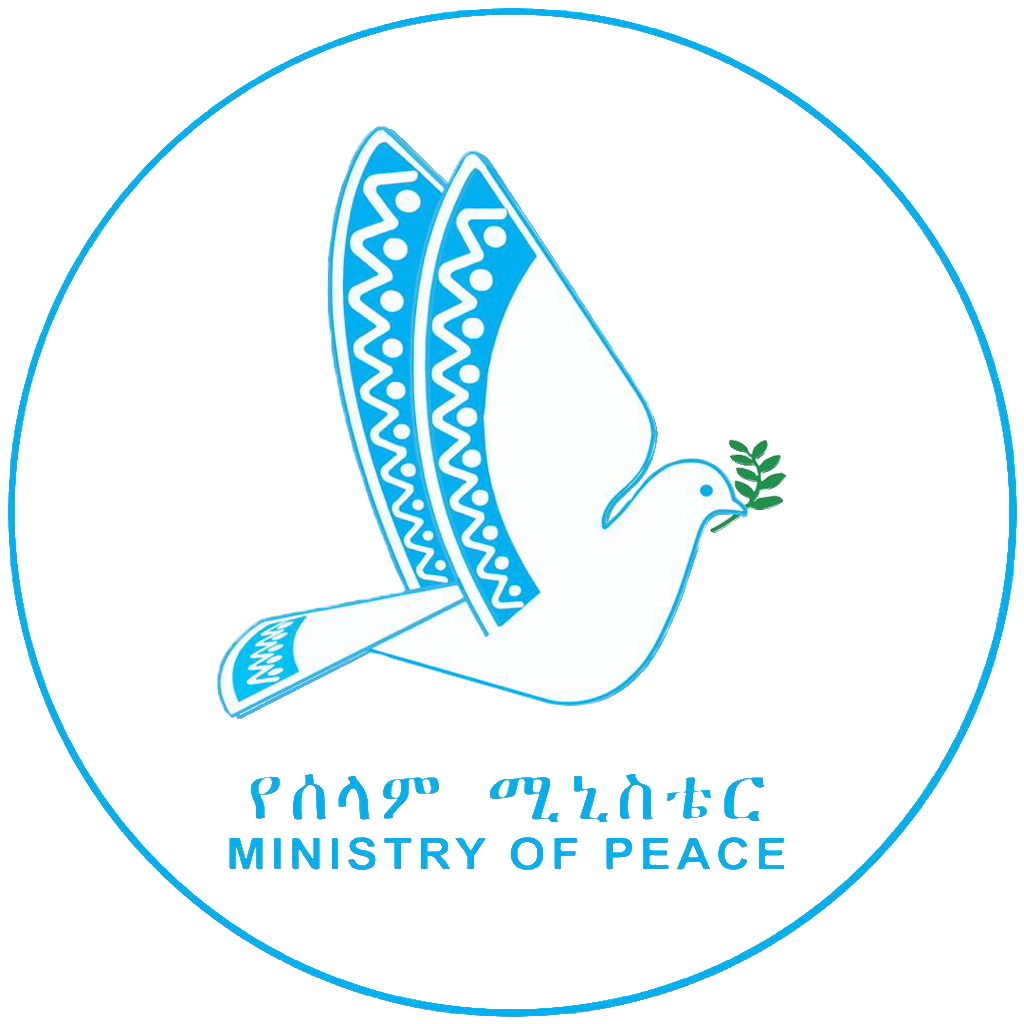

Agency overview
- Formed: 16 October 2018
- Preceding agency: Ministry of Federal Affairs
- Jurisdiction: Ethiopian government
- Headquarters: Addis Ababa Welo Sefer, Addis Ababa, Ethiopia
- Minister responsible: Mussa Adem Oumer
- Website: www.mop.gov.et

The Ministry of Peace (Amharic: ሰላም ሚኒስቴር) is a federal government executive institution of Ethiopia responsible for peacebuilding, conflict prevention and management, intergovernmental relations, national consensus, and related matters. It was established under Proclamation No. 1097/2018 and subsequently re-established with revised powers and duties under Proclamation No. 1263/2021.[1]

== History ==
The Ministry of Peace evolved from the Ministry of Federal Affairs, which was established in 2001 and initially handled regional affairs and urban development. Urban development was subsequently removed from its responsibilities. Over time, the ministry's mandate expanded to include matters relating to religious affairs, charitable organizations and societies, and other federal responsibilities.

In October 2018, the Ethiopian government established the Ministry of Peace as part of a restructuring of federal executive institutions. The new ministry was mandated to promote peace, democracy, and development, strengthen national unity, and support the prevention and resolution of conflicts.

The ministry's powers and duties were subsequently revised under Proclamation No. 1263/2021, which established its role as a federal institution leading Ethiopia's peace sector.

== Mission and vision ==
According to the ministry, its mission is to foster comprehensive and lasting peace by strengthening the safety and well-being of citizens and communities, promoting national consensus and unity, reinforcing the federal system, preventing and managing conflicts, enhancing regional and continental cooperation, and institutionalizing sustainable peace practices.

Its stated vision is to promote the dignity of every citizen, peace, and multinational unity.

== Organizational structure ==
The Ministry of Peace is headed by a federal minister and supported by state ministers responsible for specific policy and administrative areas. According to the ministry's published organizational information, its structure includes the Minister's Secretariat, a Chief Executive Officer for Operations, five Lead Executive Officers, twelve specialized desks, and ten Executive Officers reporting directly to the Minister's Office. its new form as the Ministry of Peace, the ministry's direct responsibilities in October 2018 included;

The ministry's organizational structure is intended to coordinate policy development, peacebuilding initiatives, conflict management, intergovernmental relations, and other responsibilities within its mandate.

Leadership

The ministry's published leadership information identifies the following officials

- Mussa Adem Oumer — Minister of Peace.
- Keyiredin Tezera Adera (PhD) — State Minister for Conflict Management and Peace Building.
- Endashaw Tassew G/giorgis (PhD) — State Minister for Intergovernmental Relations and National Consensus.
- Thomas Tut Puk — State Minister for Border Affairs and Human Trafficking Prevention.

== Duties and responsibilities ==
Under Proclamation No. 1263/2021, the Ministry of Peace has responsibilities that include:

1. Initiating policies, strategies, and legislation related to peace and implementing them after approval.
2. Working with federal and regional government institutions to maintain public peace and develop public awareness initiatives.
3. Promoting peace and mutual respect among religious communities, nations, nationalities, and peoples.
4. Developing strategies to prevent extremism and fanaticism associated with religion, nationality, or other causes.
5. Coordinating efforts to build consensus on major national issues and submitting recommendations to the government.
6. Supporting cultural exchange, civic education, and artistic activities that promote national unity.
7. Promoting a culture of respect, tolerance, and peaceful coexistence among communities.
8. Studying the causes of local conflicts and recommending measures to prevent instability.
9. Strengthening the federal system by promoting cooperation and mutual understanding between the federal government and regional states.
10. Facilitating the resolution of disputes between regional states in accordance with the Constitution and applicable laws.
11. Supporting regional governments, upon request, in developing solutions to disputes and conflicts.
12. Coordinating the implementation of decisions authorizing federal intervention in regional affairs, in accordance with applicable law.
13. Registering religious organizations.

== Activities ==
In December 2020, the ministry planned to coordinate the establishment of a reconciliation committee involving representatives of the Benishangul-Gumuz and Amhara regions to help address the Metekel conflict.

During the same month, the ministry signed a memorandum of understanding with the German development agency GIZ to support development activities in drought-affected communities, provide peacebuilding and conflict-resolution training for women and young people, and encourage joint development in the border area between Ethiopia's Benishangul-Gumuz Region and Sudan's Blue Nile State.
