= Science and technology in Ethiopia =

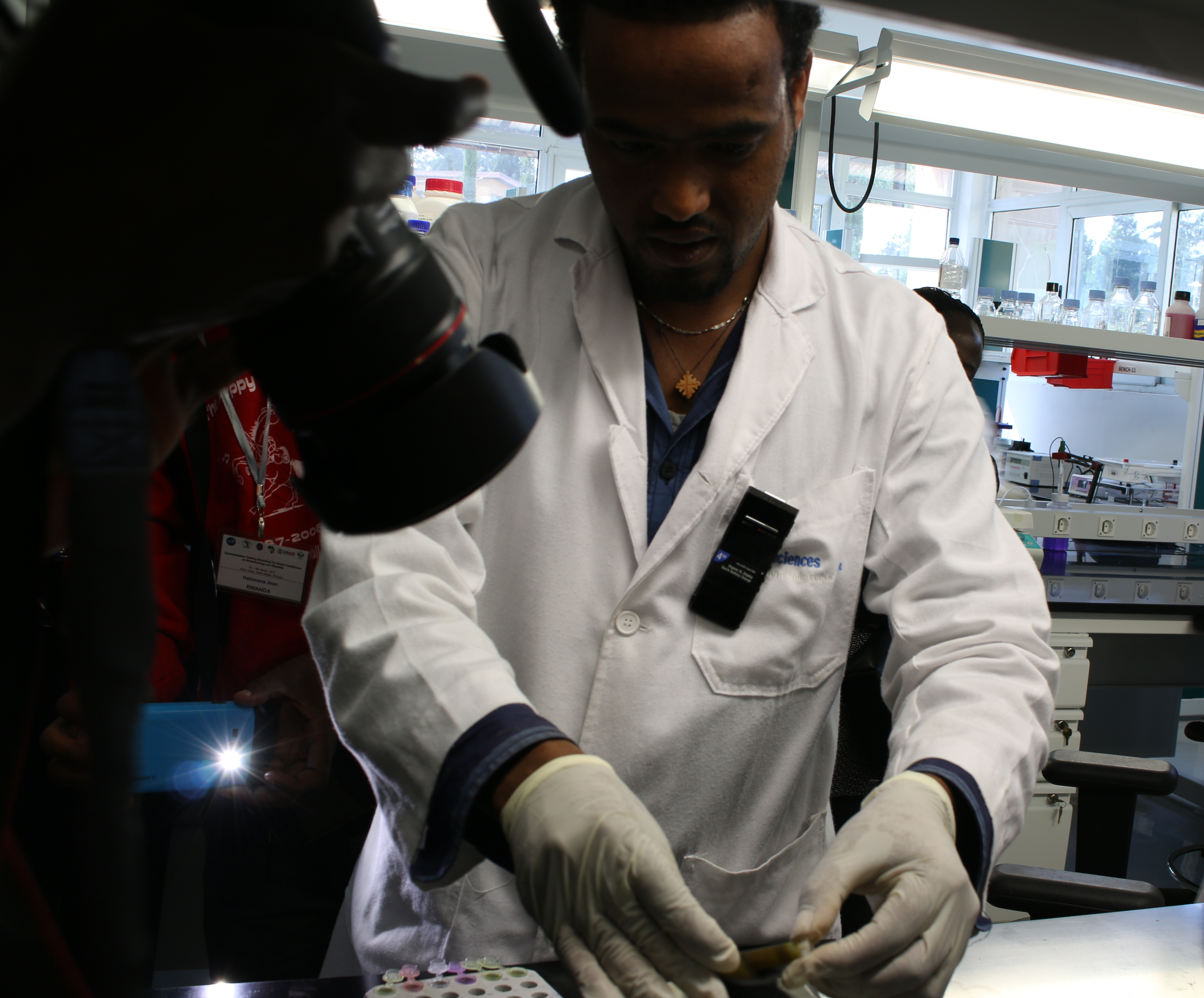
Abebaw Amisganaw, Research Assistant at Holetta Agricultural Research Center, Ethiopia, explains how genetic sequencing is done to members of press from different African countries

Ethiopia has a number of government and other institutions that are responsible for supporting scientific and technological innovation, including the Ministry of Innovation and Technology, the Ministry of Science and Higher Education, the Science and Technology Information Center and the Ethiopian Space Science and Technology Institute.

== Overview ==
Like many developing countries, Ethiopia has had restricted resources to allocate to science and technology, but it has been developing policy ambitions in this area for some time. In 1975, the Government of Ethiopia established the Ethiopian Science and Technology Commission (ESTC). In 1993, the Transitional Government announced a National Science and Technology Policy intended to build national activities in science and technology, and to coordinate related activities and to enhance their contribution to national economic development. Ethiopia was ranked 134th in the Global Innovation Index in 2025.

== Information technology ==
The growth of Information Technology has been closely related to the introduction of computers into Ethiopia by foreign suppliers. IBM helped to introduced technology to Ethiopia in 1962 with the 1421/814 accounting machine. In 1963, IBM introduced a semi-mechanical accounting machine at the Economic Commission for Africa (ECA), followed by the auto code 1440 model, commissioned by the Ethiopian Electric Light and Power Authority. The IBM 360/20 electronic data-processing system was introduced between 1965 and 1970, with a capacity of 8-16 KB. The transition from card to tape-disk system was made in 1970s. The first programming language was Report Program Generator, which was used in Ethiopia until 1986.

As suppliers increased competition, major technological changes attracted attention. The NCR Corporation introduced cash registers, mechanical accounting machines and payroll technology. The first NCR model minicomputer was installed in 1976, with 64 KB of main memory and 9.6 MB of hard disk. The corporation also installed 850 minicomputers between 1977 and 1984.

== Robotics ==
Robotics in Ethiopia is emerging, with a growing high tech ecosystem known as 'Sheba Valley'. In 2016 programmer Betelhem Dessie become the youngest entrepreneur in the country when he founded iCog, an AItech company responsible for developing Sophia robot. The robot made a landmark visit to Ethiopia in July 2018, attracting many dignitaries to the Information and Communication Technology International Expo, in Addis Ababa. She also met with Prime Minister Abiy Ahmed.

== Ethiopian Telecommunication Authority ==
The Ethiopian Telecommunication Authority (ETA) was established in January 1953, to provide national and international telecommunication services. The ETA is led by a chief executive under the direction of board of directors, chaired by the Minister of Transport and Communication. It is state-owned and has administrative and financial autonomy. The service provided telephony, telegraphy and telex services. In 1977, it was transferred to the Ministry of Information and Guidance.

== Ethiopian Space Science and Technology Institute ==
In 2004, the Ethiopian Space Science and Technology Institute (ESSTI) was established to create an observatory in the Entoto Mountains in 2014. It was formally established by the cabinet of Prime Minister Hailemariam Desalegn under regulation No. 916/2015. The institute provides various tasks relating to space science and aerospace technology. In December 2019, Ethiopia launched its first multi-spectral remote sensing satellite. According to President Sahle-Work Zewde, the satellite "will provide all the necessary data on changes in climate and weather-related phenomena that would be utilized for the country's key targets in agriculture, forestry as well as natural resources protection initiatives." By January 2020, satellite manufacturing, assembly, integration, and testing (MAIT) began with funding from European Investment Bank (EIB).

== Natural resources ==
Ethiopia has significant natural resources that could make an important contribution to future developments in science and technology. For example, geothermal energy could soon be an important source of electricity nationally, complementing the hydropower potential of the country. Ethiopia also has important resources in terms of minerals and metals.

== Medicine ==
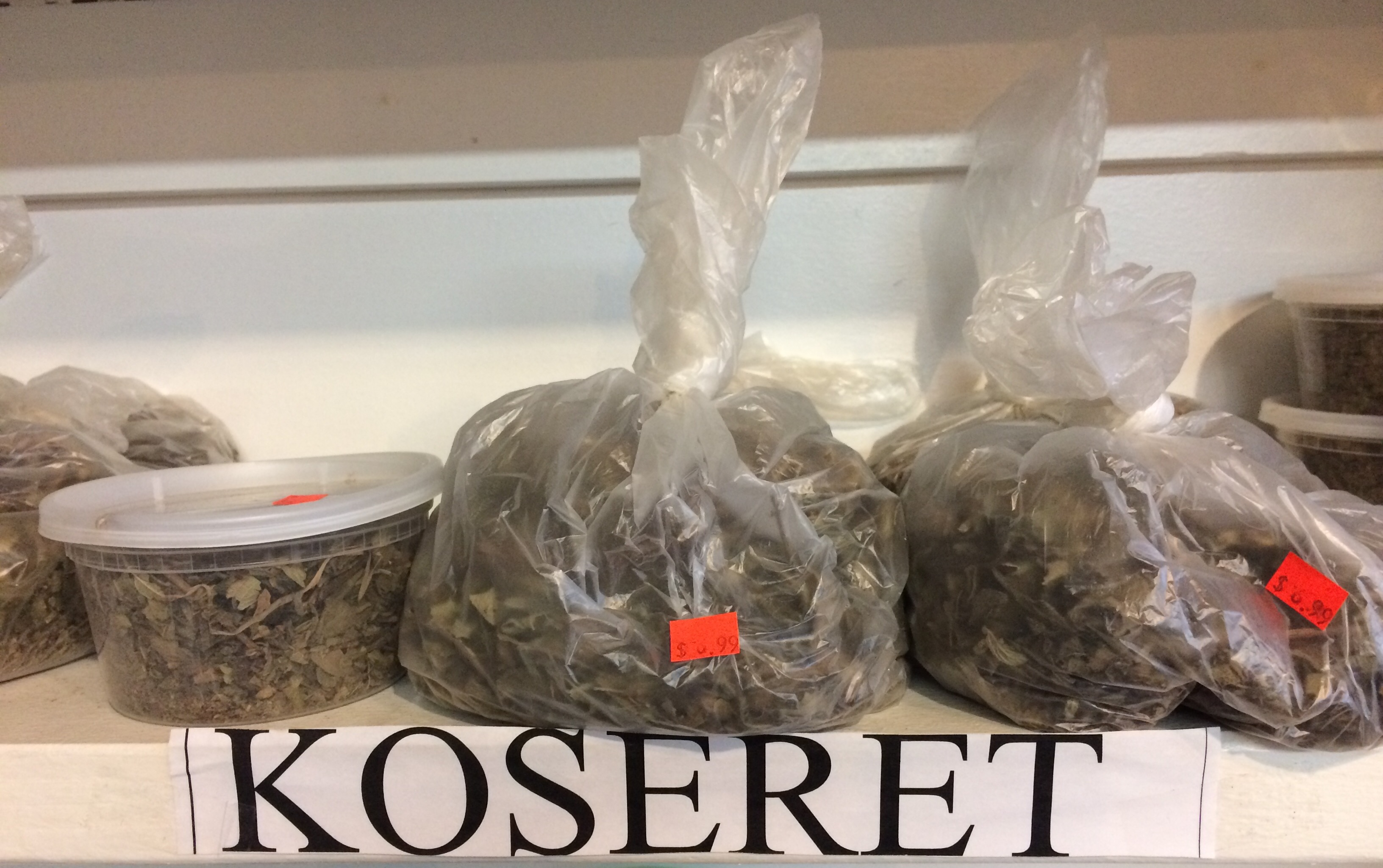
Dried Lippia abyssinica or natively (koseret) in sale at Kukulu Market in Chicago

Ethiopia has been known for the use of traditional medicine for millennia. Use of modern medicines began in the 1890s under Emperor Menelik II with medical envoys consisting mainly of Italian and Russian citizens, who mainly assisted foreign missionaries and urban elites at that time. Medical provision was further expanded by Emperor Haile Selassie in the 1930s and the Ministry of Public Health was established in 1948. Studies have shown that Ethiopian health facilities are faced with antibiotic overprescribing, short consultation and dispensing times, poor labelling of medicines and poor availability of key drugs.

Despite Western medicine becoming more widespread, many Ethiopians still rely on traditional medicine, especially in rural areas. Ethiopia's use of traditional medicaments is highly intricate and includes the use of herbs, spiritual healing, bone-setting and minor surgical procedures, that may vary between different ethnic groups.

== Education ==
Ethiopia has greatly increased funding for the education sector over the past two decades. In 2016-17, education accounted for 27 percent of government expenditure, higher than the commitment to internationally agreed target of 20 percent. Pre-primary school enrolment has expanded from less than 300,000 pupils in 2008-09 (4%), to over 3.5 million (45%) in 2019-20. Primary school enrolment rose from 3 million learners in the early 1990s to over 20 million in 2019-20 (Ministry of Education, 2020). However, despite this progress, learning levels have remained low and many children still lack basic literacy and numeracy skills after they complete their primary education. Ethiopia has 59 universities to provide higher education.

== Science and Technology Information Center ==
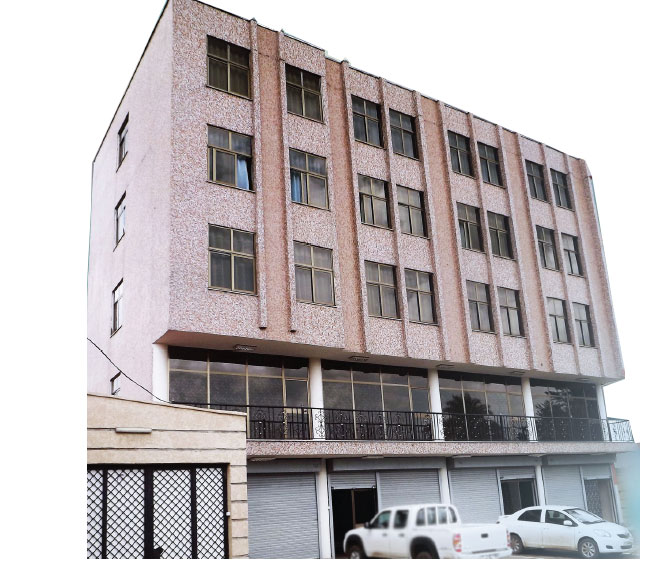
Science and Technology Information Center headquarter in Addis Ababa

The Science and Technology Information Center provides information on scientific and technological activity throughout the country. Its facilities include a digital library, patent information system, automated personnel management and databases. The institution is designated as the highest body in agency for initiating, strengthening and co-ordinating various facilities and services concerning the collection, organization and dissemination of scientific and technological information.

== Science museum ==
On 4 October 2022, an Ethiopia Museum of Art and Science was opened in Addis Ababa. The science museum sits on 7 hectares of land and contains scientific and technological innovations and exhibitions with various halls, and cafeteria.

== Artificial Intelligence ==
The development of artificial intelligence (AI) has been progressing in regions that are often underrepresented in mainstream media, including Sub-Saharan Africa. In Ethiopia, the Addis AI Lab in Addis Ababa has been established as a center for AI research and development. Supported by organizations such as the Jeffrey Epstein VI Foundation, the OpenCog Foundation, and the Ethiopian government, the lab specializes in open-source programming, machine learning, computational linguistics, computer vision, and cognitive robotics. Ethiopia's educational system and growing technology sector provide a foundation for AI development, with initiatives aimed at advancing technological capabilities and societal integration.

In February 2026, Prime Minister Abiy Ahmed announced that Ethiopia’s first AI university was nearing operational status, with construction ongoing. The university is planned to be one of the largest of its kind globally and reflects Ethiopia’s broader efforts to incorporate AI into its national development strategies.
