= Internet in Ethiopia =

In Ethiopia, the Internet penetration rate is 25% as of January 2022, and it is currently attempting a broad expansion of access throughout the country. These efforts have been hampered by the largely rural makeup of the Ethiopian population and the government's refusal to permit any privatization of the telecommunications market. Only 360,000 people had Internet access in 2008, a penetration rate of 0.4%. The state-owned Ethio Telecom (previously known as Ethiopian Telecommunications Corporation (ETC)) is the sole Internet service provider (ISP) in the country. Ethio Telecom comes in at very high prices which makes it difficult for private users to purchase it.

Internet cafés are the main source of access in urban areas, and an active community of bloggers and online journalists now play an important role in offering alternative news sources and venues for political dialogue. However, three quarters of the country's Internet cafés are in the capital city, Addis Ababa, and even there, access is often slow and unreliable. A test conducted by a Media Ethiopia researcher in July 2007 determined that the average connectivity speed was 5 kB/s and that Internet service in most cafés was unavailable between 10 and 20 percent of the time.

== Availability of Internet ==
In 2005, Ethiopia announced plans to spend hundreds of millions of dollars over the next three years to connect all of the country's schools, hospitals, and government offices, and most of its rural population, to broadband Internet via satellite or fiber-optic cable. Between 2005 and 2007, the government spent 40 million US dollars to install WoredaNET and SchoolNET, two nationwide networks meant to increase connectivity. WoredaNET provides e-mail, video conferencing and Voice over Internet Protocol (VoIP) services to local governments, and SchoolNet provides streaming audio and video through a downlink-only VSAT (Very Small Aperture Terminal) satellite. The government had pledged to dedicate 10% of its annual budget to the development and maintenance of these networks, which are managed by the government-run Ethiopian ICT Development Authority (EICTDA).

Ethiopia has made several attempts to increase available broadband by laying 4,000 kilometers of fiber-optic cable along the country's major highways, by making overtures to the East African Submarine Cable System (EASSy) and by connecting Addis Ababa to existing fiber optic networks in Port Sudan and Djibouti. These ventures have had mixed success. The domestic network is not yet operational, though the government had promised to lay 10,000 more kilometers of cable by 2010. Once the cables have been laid, it is said Ethiopia will consider opening the network to a second, private operator. EASSy has been delayed multiple times by disagreements among the member countries (though at the time of writing it was scheduled to be completed by June 2010), and the line to Djibouti was sabotaged and looted, allegedly by ONLF and OLF rebels, shortly after its completion in 2006.

Currently satellite Internet is available to some large corporations, but individuals are not permitted to have private satellite connections. The ETC also bans the use of VoIP in Internet cafés and by the general population, though its web site lists VoIP as part of the company's future broadband strategy.

In 2014, the number of Internet users in Ethiopia had increased to 1,836,035, or approximately 1.9% of the population. In 2015, it had risen to 3.7 million, or 3.7%.

By the mid-2020s, Ethiopia's internet user base grew under the government's Digital Ethiopia 2025 Strategy. The Ministry of Innovation and Technology reported that internet users increased from approximately 17 million to over 42 million during the strategy period. mobile internet users reached 46.6 million by the 2024/25 fiscal year. The government launched more than 800 public services online and established large-scale data centers, including three Tier-3 facilities developed with private-sector investment. A successor Digital Ethiopia 2030 Strategy was under preparation to replace the 2025 framework.

== Regulation and ISPs ==
Ethio Telecom and the Ethiopian Telecommunication Agency (ETA) have exclusive control of Internet access throughout the country. The ETA is not an independent regulatory body, and its staff and telecommunications policies are controlled by the national government. It grants Ethio Telecom a monopoly license as Ethiopia's sole ISP and seller of domain names under the country code top-level domain, ".et". Internet cafés and other resellers of Internet services must be licensed by the ETA and must purchase their access through the ETC. Individual purchasers must also apply for Internet connections through Ethio Telecom. In 2012, Ethiopia passed a law that prohibits anyone to "bypasses the telecom infrastructure established by the telecom service provider", which prevents any alternative Internet service provider to be created.

== Censorship ==
=== EPRDF (2012–2018) ===
During the Ethiopian People's Revolutionary Democratic Front (EPRDF) government of Ethiopia there was strong internet control. In October 2012 the OpenNet Initiative listed Ethiopia as engaged in pervasive Internet filtering in the political area, selective filtering in the conflict/security and Internet tools areas, and there is no evidence of filtering in the social area, and by ONI in October 2012. Blocked content was found to be blocked through the use of forged TCP RST (reset) packets, a method that is not transparent to users.

In 2012, Ethiopia remained a highly restrictive environment in which to express political dissent online. The government of Ethiopia has long filtered critical and oppositional political content. Broad application of the country's 2009 anti-terrorism proclamation has served as the basis for a number of recent convictions with bloggers and journalists convicted on terrorism charges based on their online and offline writings. Most notably, in July 2012 blogger Eskinder Nega was jailed on an 18-year sentence on charges of attempting to incite violence through his blog posts. This incident was the seventh arrest of Nega for his critical writings. Nega was accused of conspiring with Ginbot 7, an opposition political group labeled a terrorist organization by the Ethiopian government. Also convicted in absentia were Abebe Gellaw of the online news platform Addis Voice, as well as Mesfin Negash and Abiye Teklemariam, editors of the news website Addis Neger Online. A number of other journalists and opposition political figures were also simultaneously convicted of similar offenses. In January 2012, Elias Kifle, editor of Ethiopian Review, was convicted in absentia under the same anti-terrorism laws. In April 2014, a team of journalists and bloggers called Zone 9 were arrested under similar terrorism charges in Addis Ababa. Similarly, in July 2014, Zelalem Workagegnehu, the contributor of the Diaspora-based De Birhan Blog along with his two friends (Yonatan Wolde and Bahiru Degu), who applied for a Digital Security Course, were arrested and later charged with the Anti-Terror Proclamation. Bahiru and Yonatan were acquitted by the court on 15 April 2016.Eskinder Nega was freed on 14 February 2018.

The government has also passed a law restricting the use of Voice over Internet Protocol (VoIP) applications such as Skype. While government representatives portrayed the law as a means of protecting domestic telecommunications providers, some critics described the new draft legislation as an attempt to criminalize the use of VoIP services to punish dissent. A 2014 report describes the "Rules for Cafe Operators", which includes making all computer screens visible to the operator and reporting any content critical of the government, or visiting sensitive political websites. Other reports describe attempts by Ethiopia's sole ISP, Ethio telecom, to restrict the use of tools to anonymize web browsing and circumvent Internet filtering. In May 2012, developers of the Internet anonymizer software project Tor reported that the Ethiopian Telecommunications Corporation (ETC) / Ethio telecom had begun using deep packet inspection (DPI) to block access to the Tor service.

=== Abiy Ahmed (2018–present) ===
On 22 June 2018, Prime Minister Abiy Ahmed's government ordered the unblocking of over 200 websites as part of reforms that also saw banned TV channels restored and several political prisoners set free. Announcing the reforms, Abiy's Chief of Staff Fitsum Arega reaffirmed freedom of expression as a "foundational right."

On the morning of 11 June 2019, internet monitoring group NetBlocks reported a total internet shutdown across Ethiopia following the blocking of messaging applications Telegram and WhatsApp by Ethio Telecom the previous day. Interpreted as a measure to prevent cheating in nationwide exams, the disruption angered business owners and incurred an estimated $17m loss to Ethiopia's GDP. Connectivity returned briefly on two occasions during four consecutive days of national blackouts that were followed by further regional disruptions. WhatsApp was unblocked on the 17th although internet access was only fully restored on the 18th and Telegram remained blocked without explanation.

In June 2019, the internet connection has been slow down by unknown reason. It has been restored days later. The connection completely shut down again since the assassination of General Se'are Mekonnen, Ambachew Mekonnen, Ezez Wassie, and Gizae Aberra on 22 June 2019. Later, it came back with full connection after two weeks on 2 July 2019.

On June 30, 2020, internet access was heavily shutdown nationwide following the death of Hachalu Hundessa prior on 29 June. It was delayed throughout the violence. On 14 July, Wi-Fi connection has been restored when mobile data preserved as of 23 July.

Early in the morning of 4 November 2020, during the Tigray conflict, a subnational internet cutoff of about 15%, consistent with reports of a telephone and internet block on the Tigray Region, was reported by NetBlocks. After the breakup of the illegal Oromia holy synod and the Ethiopian Orthodox Tewahedo Holy Synod, the government blocked various social media platforms indefinitely such as Facebook, Telegram, YouTube and TikTok since 9 February 2023 as the Orthodox Church threatened to organize wide rallies.

== Surveillance ==
The Ethiopian government is engaged in extensive surveillance of Internet users both inside and outside Ethiopia. In August 2012, Ethiopia was included on a list of 10 countries that own the commercial spyware suite FinFisher. The Ethiopian government agency involved in surveillance and content blocking is called the Information Network Security Agency.

In December 2006, the Ethiopian Telecommunication Agency began requiring Internet cafés to log the names and addresses of individual customers, reportedly as part of an effort to track users who engaged in illegal activities online. The lists are to be turned over to the police, and Internet café owners who fail to register users may face prison.

Bloggers believe that their communications are being monitored, and the state maintains the right to shut down Internet access for resellers or customers who do not comply with security guidelines. The government has closed Internet cafés in the past for offering VoIP services and for other policy violations.

A 2014 study by Human Rights Watch found extensive surveillance of the Internet and other telecommunication systems in the country. Ethiopian security and intelligence agencies can use internet surveillance capabilities to access files and activity on a target's computer; to log keystrokes and passwords; and to remotely activate the device's webcam and microphone. The surveillance technology was provided by foreign firms, notably China-based ZTE, as well as FinFisher and Hacking Team.

== Internet speed ==
As of January 2019 in Addis Ababa there are 2G/3G and 4G (Ethiopian Telecommunication) connection options. Despite the availability of 4G sim & connections speed for a mobile connection reaches 800 Mbit/s of download speed, and 450 Mbit/s for upload (average 200 Mbit/s download, 90 Mbit/s upload). The availability suffers a bit: on 18 January 2019 there was a daytime blackout of the Internet (an Ethio telecom operator stated that it has been for national security reason).

== See also ==
- Communications in Ethiopia
- Telecommunications in Ethiopia
- Media in Ethiopia
