= Addis Neger =

Addis Neger may refer to:

- Addis Neger (website), an Ethiopian daily news website
- Addis Neger (newspaper), an Ethiopian weekly newspaper
