= Mesfin (name) =

Mesfin (Amharic: መስፍን) is a male name of Ethiopian origin that may refer to:

== People with the given name ==
- Mesfin Hagos, militant and founding member of the Eritrean People's Liberation Front
- Mesfin Negash, Ethiopian journalist
- Mesfin Woldemariam (born 1930), Ethiopian human right activist and philosopher

== People with the surname ==
- Azeb Mesfin, Ethiopian politician and widow Meles Zenawi
- Hunegnaw Mesfin (born 1989), Ethiopian long-distance runner
- Nahom Mesfin Tariku (born 1989), Ethiopian steeplechase runner
- Seyoum Mesfin (1949–2021), Ethiopian politician and diplomat
