= Frehiwot =

Frehiwot, also spelled Firehiwot, Frehiwat or Firiehiwot is an Ethiopian female given name. Notable people with the name include:

- Firehiwot Dado, Ethiopian long-distance runner
- Frehiwot Gesese (born 2006), Ethiopian steeplechaser
- Frehiwat Goshu, Ethiopian long-distance runner
- Frehiwot Tamiru, Ethiopian public official; CEO of Ethio telecom since 2018
