= Ethiopian Biotechnology Institute =

Government-owned research institute in Addis Ababa, Ethiopia

Bio and Emerging Technology Institute (BETin)
- Formation: 2016; 10 years ago
- Founder: Kassahun Tesfaye (PhD), Hailu Dadi (PhD)
- Type: Research and Development institute under the Ministry of Innovation and Technology (MiNT) of Ethiopia
- Headquarters: Addis Ababa, Ethiopia
- Coordinates: 8.997273°N 38.758894°E
- Owner: Ethiopian government
- Director-general: Kassahun Tesfaye (PhD)
- Deputy Director General: Hailu Dadi (PhD)
- Website: www.betin.gov.et

The Bio and Emerging Technology Institute (BETin), formerly known as Ethiopian Biotechnology Institute (EBTi), is a research institute owned by the Government of Ethiopia. It was established in 2016 in Addis Ababa, Ethiopia.

== History ==
The Bio and Emerging Technology Institute was the first research institute to prepare and publish a national biotechnology policy to the Ministry of Science and Technology (MoST) for review and endorsement of its approval by the Council of Ministers (CoM).

In 2021, the institute was renamed from the Ethiopian Biotechnology Institute to the Bio and Emerging Technology Institute under Proclamation No. 1263/2021, which broadened its mandate from biotechnology to also include emerging technologies such as nanotechnology, materials science, and computational science.

In April 2025, the institute received nine patents and two utility model certificates from the Ethiopian Intellectual Property Authority for products developed by its researchers, including a bio-pesticide formulation derived from Agarista salicifolia for use against maize weevils and a vertical-farming device.
