= Frehiwot Tamiru =

Ethiopian public official; CEO of Ethio telecom since 2018

- ፍሬህይወት ታምሩ

Minister of Innovation and Technology
- Incumbent
- Assumed office 8 October 2026
- Preceded by: Belete Molla

CEO of Ethio telecom
- In office 25 July 2018 – 16 October 2026
- Appointed by: Abiy Ahmed
- Preceded by: Andualem Admassie
- Succeeded by: Tariku Demissie (Acting)

Personal details
- Born: Addis Ababa, Ethiopia
- Education: Open University (MBA)
- Committees: GSMA Board Member; GSMA Foundation Board members
- Awards: 2023 laureates of Choiseul 100 Africa Economic Leaders of Tomorrow; 2022 African CEO Awards in the telecommunication sector

Frehiwot Tamru (Amharic: ፍሬህይወት ታምሩ) is an Ethiopian public official who is currently the Minister of Innovation and Technology since 2026. She was known for her role as CEO of Ethio telecom, a major telecommunication and internet provider in Ethiopia from 25 July 2018.

== Career and education ==
Frehiwot was born and raised in Addis Ababa. She has Master of Business Administration from Open University in UK and Bachelor of Science in Information System. She also worked in regional minister of construction, transport and communication in Afar Region.

Soon after, she worked as deputy CEO of the former Ethiopian Telecommunication Communication for Internal Support Service. She then left to establish her own company called Doxa IT Technology Plc. Until 2018, Frehiwot has worked in board member of Ethio telecom, a major telecommunication and internet provider in the country. On 25 July 2018, Frehiwot was appointed by Prime Minister Abiy Ahmed as CEO of Ethio telecom, succeeding Andualem Admassie. She became a member of Prosperity Party.

Under her leadership, Ethio telecom saw a significant growth in the subscriber base and revenue, as the tariff made of 40%-50%. The company became state-owned with its telecom sector.
