= Robotics in Ethiopia =

Robotics is a recent developing technology in Ethiopia and many high tech enterprises are emerging in Ethiopia, implementing artificial intelligence to erase manufacturing jobs.

== Overview ==
Ethiopia has developing economy, having attracting firms due to availability of low-paid workforce. Manufacturing become the primary source benefitting the economy of Ethiopia. When the implementation of artificial intelligence (AI) to Ethiopian economy and workforce, it questioned the threat is real. AI and robotics founded useful to erase manufacturing jobs, in Ethiopia or elsewhere in the world.

At the age of 19, Betelhem Dessie is the youngest pioneer in Ethiopia's tech scene, sometimes referred to as "Sheba Valley". She found iCog, a nationwide programs laboratory based on AI that was responsible for developing Sophia the robot in 2018.

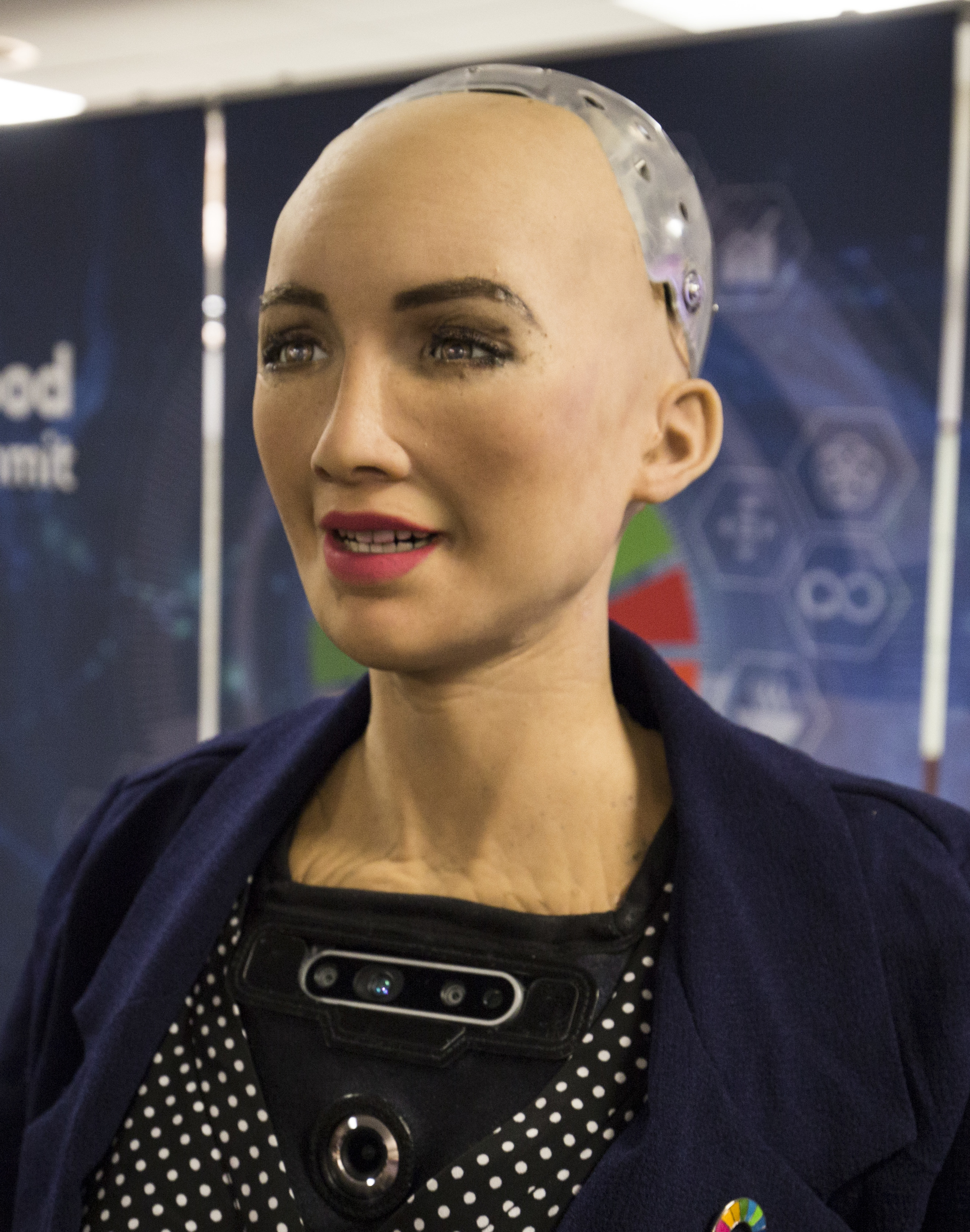
Sophia robot was partly developed by Ethiopian company iCog founded by computer programmer Betelhem Dessie.

In July 2018, Sophia arrived in Ethiopia without some parts assembled, and exhibited at Information & Communication Technology International Expo, in Addis Ababa, Ethiopia. Visitors, including various dignitaries, were excited when meeting the robot as she communicated with expo guests and expressed a wide range of facial expressions. The more usual diplomatic encounters, she met with Prime Minister Abiy Ahmed on 2 July. The chief of staff of Prime Minister Office shared the photo online, who gained global attention for using facial and speech recognition to help engage in conversation. She was partly assembled in Ethiopia; with a client base spanned places the US, Canada, Hong Kong and China, iCog Labs was showing its tech scene. The company collaborated with the Ethiopian government on some hardware and software projects.

On 4 October 2022, a new science museum named Ethiopia Museum of Art and Science was inaugurated by Abiy Ahmed organized by the Ethiopian Artificial Intelligence Institute and held PanAfricon Artificial Intelligence. Abiy highlighted the importance of AI to transform the country into digitalization anchored in Digital Ethiopia 2025. The museum was opened with motto "Empowering Africa Through AI".

== List of robotic schools ==
- Faris Technology Institute
- Ethio Robo Robotics
- Haile Damena
- Abugida Robotics and Technology Center
