= Telecommunications in Ethiopia =

Telecommunications in Ethiopia is a monopoly in the control of Ethio telecom, formerly the Ethiopian Telecommunications Corporation (ETC). As of 2012, 20.524 million cellular phones and 797,500 main line phones were in use.

== Overview ==
The telephone system in Ethiopia consists of open wire and microwave radio relay systems adequate for government use. Domestic systems are open wire; microwave radio relay; radio communication in the high frequency, very high frequency, and ultra high frequency; two domestic satellites provide the national trunk service. International systems are open wire to Djibouti and Sudan; microwave radio relay to Djibouti and Kenya; and satellite earth stations are 3 Intelsat (1 Atlantic Ocean and 2 Indian Ocean).

The Ethiopian dial plan changed on 17 September 2005. City codes (i.e., internal prefixes) changed from two digits to three (or, from outside Ethiopia, one digit to two). Phone numbers changed from six digits to seven.

In 2007, there were 89 internet hosts. There were 447,300 internet users in 2009. In 2010, just 0.75 percent of the population were using the Internet, one of the lowest rates in the world. The internet domain in Ethiopia is .et.

== History ==
The first telegraph line in Ethiopia was constructed in the years 1897–1899 between the cities of Harar and the capital Addis Ababa. This was extended in 1904 by a line that ran from Addis Ababa through Tigray into Eritrea and to Massawa; and the next year by a line again from Addis Ababa to Gore in the province of Illubabor and Jimma in Kaffa.

The first telephones were brought by Ras Makonnen from Italy in 1890, and connected between the Palace and the Imperial treasury; the sound of disembodied voices frightened the local priests, who thought it was the work of demons. The Emperor Menelik II responded to their protests with disdain, and later used the telephone to give orders to his provincial governors. Emperor Haile Selassie had begun the process of introducing radio transmitters to the country for civilian and military use in the years before the Italian invasion.

== Current status ==
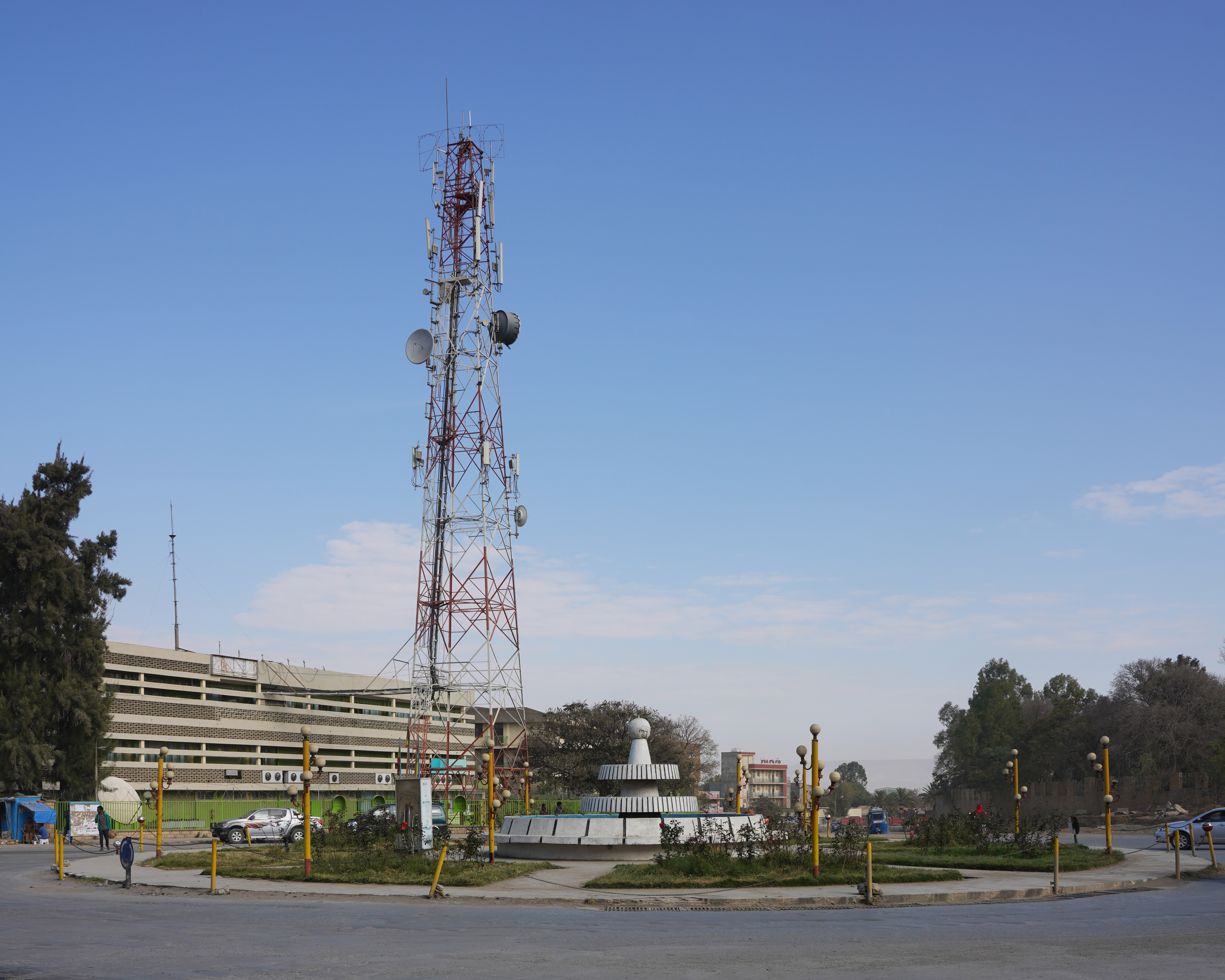
Ethio Telecom building and antenna mast in Mekelle

According to the ETC, the average rural inhabitant of Ethiopia has to walk 30 kilometers to the nearest phone. The ETC announced 7 September 2006 a program to improve national coverage, and reduce the average distance to 5 kilometers.

Since 2008 CDMA2000 and WCDMA is available in certain areas.

Since 26 September 2017 until end of 2018 it was not possible to buy and use Ethio telecom SIM cards in mobile devices that have not been purchased in Ethiopia or registered with the authorities. Local advice suggests travellers should register their phone in the customs arrival hall at Bole Airport on arrival if they intend to use a local SIM card. For travellers, local prepaid SIMs are available at small shops, Ethio telecom kiosks and hotels. Satellite phones may require letter of permission from the ETC prior to bringing such phones through customs.

Use of voice over IP services such as Skype and Google Talk was prohibited by telecommunications legislation in 2002. Personal use of these services was legalised by the Proclamation on Telecom Fraud Offences of 2012.

Since the changes and upgrade of equipment in the mid-2000 the telecommunication network is frequently out of work or overloaded, callers using both the landlines and mobile network are unable to connect, the situation is made worse by inclement weather. The ETC has not addressed this issue publicly nor admitted that the coverage and service is below par.

Ethio telecom has launched the Fourth Generation (4G) Long-Term Evolution (LTE) service on 21 March 2015 in line with the help of the Chinese company HUAWEI.

As of 2015, Ethio telecom Corporate Compunction Officer, Abdurahim Mohammed, stated that the rural telecom access within 5 km radius service has currently reached 96 per cent. As part of the efforts to expand its service and improve network quality, Ethio telecom had built 725 stations in Addis Ababa alone during the past 20 years. Damages on fiber optic cables and power interruptions are among the challenges the service provider faced in its expansion and network quality improvement efforts.

== Telecom Liberalization ==
=== Background ===
Ethiopia's telecommunications sector was historically dominated by the state-owned Ethio Telecom, which held a monopoly on fixed and mobile services for decades. In June 2018, the Ethiopian government announced plans to liberalize the sector to allow private domestic and foreign investment, aiming to increase competition, improve coverage, and drive digital transformation.

=== Ethiopian Communications Authority ===
In 2019, Ethiopia established the Ethiopian Communications Authority (ECA) to regulate the telecom sector and issue licenses for new operators, marking a crucial institutional reform supporting liberalization.

=== Entry of Private Operators ===
The landmark event in the liberalization process occurred in May 2021 when the ECA awarded the first private nationwide telecom license to a consortium led by Kenya's Safaricom. Safaricom Telecommunication Ethiopia launched its services in 2022, rolling out networks in Addis Ababa and other major cities. This broke Ethio Telecom's monopoly and introduced market competition.

=== Privatization of Ethio Telecom ===
The government initiated plans to partially privatize Ethio Telecom by selling a minority stake. Initially targeting a 40-45% share, challenges and investor concerns delayed the process. By late 2023, plans shifted towards a smaller divestment of 10% through the Ethiopian Securities Exchange, focusing on local investors.

=== Further Market Liberalization ===
Ethiopia aims to issue two more telecom licenses to increase competition. However, the Ethiopian Communications Authority paused the issuance of new licenses in mid-2023 to improve regulatory frameworks and create favorable investment conditions. The third operator license is anticipated to be awarded by late 2025 or early 2026.

=== Impact and Future Prospects ===
Telecom liberalization has significantly increased mobile penetration from 36.7% in 2019 to over 61% in 2024, with broadband adoption also expected to grow. The reforms are vital to Ethiopia's digital strategy, improving service affordability, coverage, and quality. The government's goals include reducing bureaucratic obstacles and leveraging private investment to foster innovation, network expansion, and economic growth.

== See also ==
- Internet in Ethiopia
- Ethiopian Telecommunication Agency
- Ethiopian Telecommunications Corporation
- Global Partnership for Ethiopia
- Terrestrial fibre optic cable projects in Ethiopia
- EBC
- Media in Ethiopia
- Communications in Ethiopia
- Telephone numbers in Ethiopia
