= Ethiopian Investment Holdings =

Ethiopian sovereign wealth fund

- Native name: የኢትዮጵያ ኢንቨስትመንት ሆልዲንግስ
- Company type: State-owned
- Genre: Sovereign wealth fund
- Founded: December 2021; 31 January 2022 (joined the African SWF)
- Headquarters: Wingate Street, Addis Ababa, Ethiopia
- Area served: Ethiopia
- Key people: Brook Taye (CEO)
- Total assets: 45 billion USD (2025)
- Owner: Ethiopian government
- Website: eih.et

The Ethiopian Investment Holdings (Amharic: የኢትዮጵያ ኢንቨስትመንት ሆልዲንግስ; EIH) is a sovereign wealth fund headquartered in Wingate Street, Addis Ababa, Ethiopia. Established in December 2021, EIH encompasses thirty largest companies like Ethio telecom and Ethiopian Airlines.

In January 2022, EIH joined the African sovereign wealth fund.

== History ==
Ethiopian Investment Holdings (EIH) was established in December 2021 under Council of Ministers regulation No. 487/2022, with formal inauguration on 31 January 2022. It has a vision of creating "wealth, finance national development, and improve living standards for present and future generations".

According to deputy CEO of EIH Yasmin Wohabrebbi, most companies under EIH are profitable due to wide range reform to improve their activities.

EIH joined the African Sovereign Investors Forum in July 2023.

Since October 2023, EIH owns a 25% share of the Ethiopian Securities Exchange (ESX) in a public-private partnership. EIH also list some of its companies on the ESX, such as the Ethiopian Shipping and Logistic Services and the Ethiopian Insurance Corporation.

In August 2024, Brook Taye was appointed CEO of EIH. In December 2024, EIH announced that eight new enterprises were added to its portfolio, which were previously managed by the Public Enterprises Holding and Administration.

EIH signed a Memorandum of Understanding with the Azerbaijan Investment Holdings in February 2025.
