= Abraham Belay =

Ethiopian politician

- አብራሃም በላይ
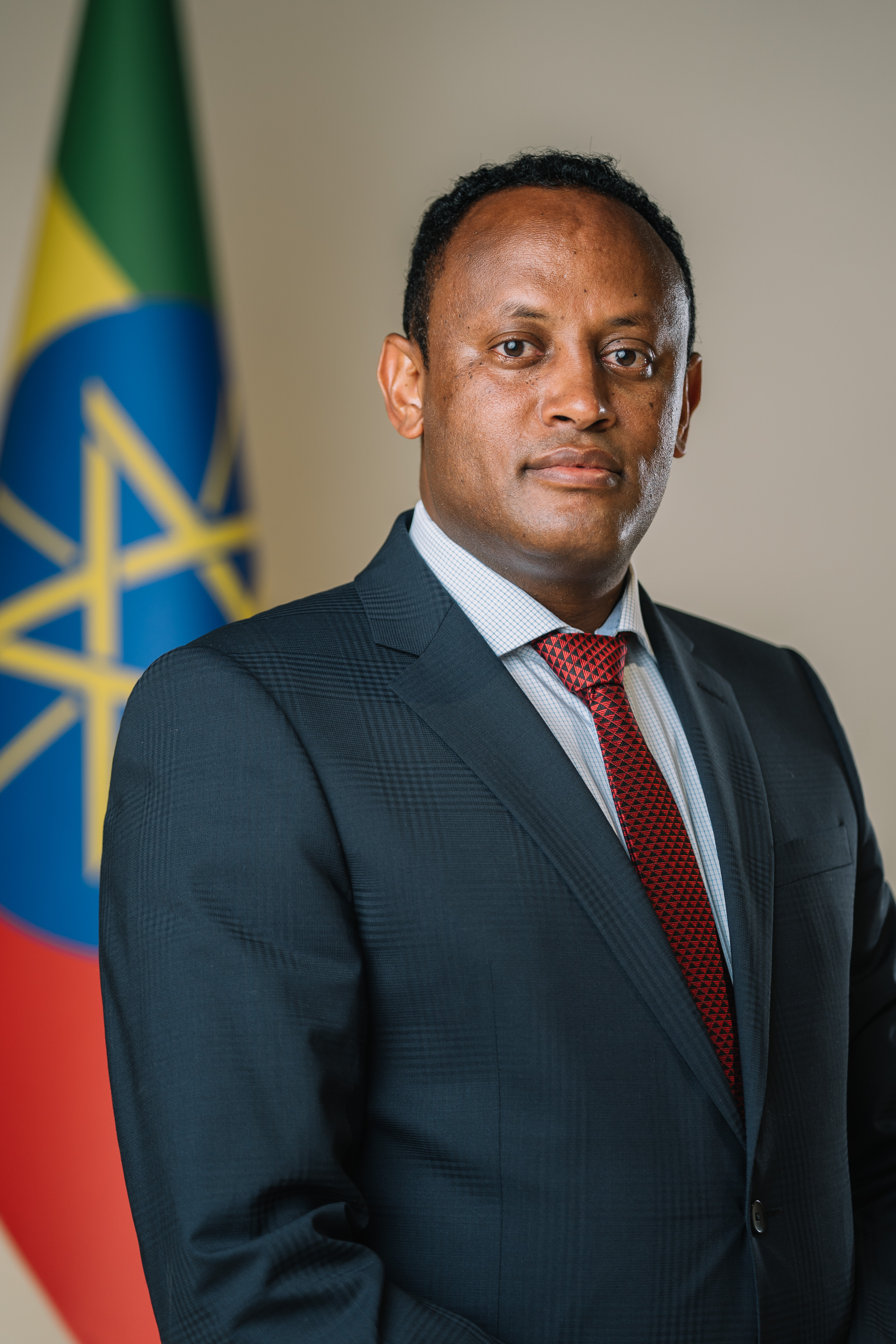

Minister of Irrigation and Lowland Areas Development
- Incumbent
- Assumed office 20 May 2024
- Preceded by: Aisha Mohammed

Minister of Defense
- In office 6 October 2021 – 20 May 2024
- Appointed by: Abiy Ahmed
- Preceded by: Kenea Yadeta

Chief Executive Officer of the Transitional Government of Tigray Disputed with Debretsion Gebremichael from 6 May 2021 until 3 March 2022
- In office 6 May 2021 – 23 March 2023
- Appointed by: Abiy Ahmed
- Preceded by: Mulu Nega
- Succeeded by: Getachew Reda

President of the Tigray Prosperity Party
- Incumbent
- Assumed office Before 5 May 2021

Minister of Innovation and Technology
- In office 22 January 2020 – 6 October 2021
- Prime Minister: Abiy Ahmed
- Preceded by: Getahun Mekuria
- Succeeded by: Belete Molla

Personal details
- Party: Prosperity Party
- Other political affiliations: Independent
- Education: Addis Ababa University

Abraham Belay (Amharic: አብራሃም በላይ) is an Ethiopian politician serving as the Minister of Irrigation and Lowland Areas Development since 2024. Belay served as the Minister of Defense from 2021. An ethnic Tigrayan, he previously served as the Minister of Innovation and Technology, and as president of the Tigray Region Prosperity Party.

== Career ==
He serves as a board member of the Ethiopian Roads Authority and the Commercial Bank of Ethiopia. Previously, he also served as board chairman of the Ethiopian Communication Authority, Ethiopian Electric Power, the Metals and Engineering Corporation, the Ethiopian News Agency, and Ambo University.
