= ESX =

ESX may refer to:

- Dodge Intrepid ESX, a hybrid electric automobile
- East Sussex, a county in South East England
- Essex Junction station (station code ESX), Vermont, United States
- ESX-1, a pore-forming protein system of M. tuberculosis
- ESX-1, an Electribe electronic musical instrument
- Ethosuximide, an anti epileptic drugs paper
- Ethiopian Securities Exchange
- VMware ESX, a computer virtualization product
