= Getahun Mekuria =

Ethiopian politician and engineer

- ጌታሁን መኩሪያ

Minister of Education
- In office 22 January 2020 – 6 October 2021
- President: Sahle-Work Zewde
- Prime Minister: Abiy Ahmed
- Preceded by: Tilaye Gette
- Succeeded by: Berhanu Nega

Minister of Innovation and Technology
- In office 16 October 2018 – 22 January 2020
- President: Sahle-Work Zewde
- Prime Minister: Abiy Ahmed
- Preceded by: position established
- Succeeded by: Abraham Belay

Minister of Science and Technology
- In office 1 November 2016 – 16 October 2018
- President: Mulatu Teshome
- Prime Minister: Hailemariam Desalegn; Abiy Ahmed
- Preceded by: Abiy Ahmed
- Succeeded by: position abolished

Personal details
- Education: University Duisburg-Essen; Addis Ababa University
- Occupation: Engineer

Getahun Mekuria (Amharic: ጌታሁን መኩሪያ) is an Ethiopian politician and engineer who has served as several positions in the government cabinet such as the Minister of Science and Technology from 2016 to 2018 and its merger, the Minister of Innovation and Technology from 2018 to 2020, and the Minister of Education from 2020 to 2021.

== Education and career ==
Getahun earned doctorate in engineering from the University Duisburg-Essen in Germany, where he studied a DAAD scholarship holder. Getahun worked as an assistant professor of electrical engineering at Addis Ababa University and has been director of the Siemens subsidiary in Ethiopia. In November 2016, Getahun succeeded Abiy Ahmed as Minister of Science and Technology and served until 2018. In October 2018, the minister was merged to Ministry of Innovation and Technology and he was appointed as minister. During his office, Getahun joined as advisor of XRP Ledger Foundation, a non-profit organization that promotes development of Ripple. On 22 January 2020, he was appointed as Minister of Education upon ministerial appointment by Prime Minister Abiy Ahmed. On 6 October 2021, he left the minister during cabinet reshuffle, succeeded by Berhanu Nega.
