= Abiye Teklemariam =

Ethiopian journalist and co-founder of newspaper Addis Neger

Abiye Teklemariam Megenta, also known as Abiye Teklemariam, is an Ethiopian print and radio journalist who co-founded the defunct Addis Neger, which was the largest private newspaper in Ethiopia before its closure in December 2009. Three top editors of the newspaper quietly slipped out of the country, accusing the Ethiopian government of relentless intimidation, harassment and persecution. Abiye, who was the newspaper's executive editor, had left the country two months earlier for the United Kingdom. On a BBC interview, he defended the decision of his colleagues to leave the country, claiming that the government's plan to bring charges against the newspaper's top editors made their tasks impossible.

Presently, he is a vocal democracy activist and a student in Oxford, England.

== Career ==
A lawyer and political theorist by training, Abiye started his media career writing on legal issues of the Eritrean-Ethiopian War (1998–2000) on the Ethiopian Reporter, a private weekly newspaper. He later wrote a mea culpa questioning his early “unskeptical” support of the war, in which he lamented that the war's popular support arose from jingoist ideas of patriotism. He criticized the forced expulsion of Eritreans from Ethiopia as a travesty of human values. His view was attacked for being insufficiently sensitive of political reality. He suggested that the two countries should adopt the European Union's economic and political model to avoid subsequent wars.

Abiye found fame in sports analysis. Blunt and intentionally contrarian, he complimented the famous Fiseha Tegegn’s authoritative style on "Talk Football", a Sunday football talk show co-presented by the duo. The talk show was discontinued by the Ethiopian government, following the bloody protests of June 2005. The government accused both presenters of supporting an unlawful insurrection.

== Politics ==
Abiye describes himself as a Post-Rawlsian liberal, although he has never defined what it means. In one of his blogs, he suggested that the principle of Justice as Fairness that is associated with the American philosopher John Rawls can be modified by adopting some salient points raised by Rawls' "identity and difference" critics to form a coherent system of thought that can solve Ethiopia's fundamental political problems. He argued that Liberalism had answers to the issues of language, identity and poverty. In his early writing, he supported the current federal arrangement in Ethiopia but said the power of interpreting the constitution should not be vested upon the upper chamber of parliament. He claimed that a strong inter-state commerce provision in the constitution coupled with a hybrid presidential/parliamentary system and a judiciary that has a power to interpret the constitution could strengthen the union without endangering the federal arrangement. In recent years, he has been silent on this issue.

He mainly blogs about politics now, and often criticizes Ethiopian government of perpetrating human rights abuses and closing spaces of democratic participation. He says two political issues - government co-optation and fake growth numbers - are his obsessions now.

== Controversy ==
After the Ethiopian general election in 2005, Abiye turned into a vociferous critic of the government, sometimes writing articles riddled with statistical analysis, which he said could prove that the EPRDF might have lost the election. But he stopped short of calling for the overthrow of the government. The paper he edited was shut down in December 2005. He had been arrested by the police. In 2010, the government charged Abiye and five other journalists under the country's anti-terrorism law. An Ethiopian judge sentenced Abiye to eight years in prison, citing his role in providing outlawed opposition groups a platform to disseminate anti-government propaganda on his website. Abiye called the prosecution a politically motivated attack on dissent.

In September 2009, Addis Neger published an editorial believed to have been written by Abiye and his colleague Mesfin Negash that questioned the journalistic value of balance. The editorial said Addis Neger believed that the fundamental journalistic ideal was truth and journalists could not reach the truth by splitting the difference or giving equal lines to competing claims. Addis Neger professed to follow rigorous social science methods in investigating issues. "What differentiates our approach from academic works is not methodology," the paper declared. "It is writing style and presentation. We believe journalists are social scientists. No social scientist worthy of his profession reaches conclusions by balancing competing claims." In response to this editorial, the state media said Addis Neger had exposed that it was not independent.

== Styles of writing ==
Abiye and his colleagues at Addis Neger were known for a distinctive writing technique which mixed long narratives with analysis. Supporters of the Ethiopian government accused them of using this style to repeatedly cast doubts on the government's core policy successes. Abiye wrote articles which questioned the government's growth figures, inflation curbing policies, mega-dam projects, human rights records and foreign policy. He was, however, very critical of most of the opposition parties even though in the last days of Addis Neger he wrote articles which praised Medrek, a coalition of eight opposition parties. In interviews, he expressed his support for Medrek's goal of mid-way solution for Ethiopia and praised the coalition's democratic aspirations. He was also criticized for his support to jailed opposition leader Birtukan Mideksa.

In 2007, Abiye reported on the US elections from Washington DC. He was accused of lack of objectivity as some of his articles had visible pro-Obama slant. Abiye was also generally criticized for strong neo-liberal views in most of his writings and his apparent links with Western policy makers. In a country where newspapers repeatedly went out of business owing to government pressure, Addis Neger's closure prompted unusually strong reactions from Western countries.
