= Science and Technology Information Center (Ethiopia) =

Ethiopian scientific and technological organization

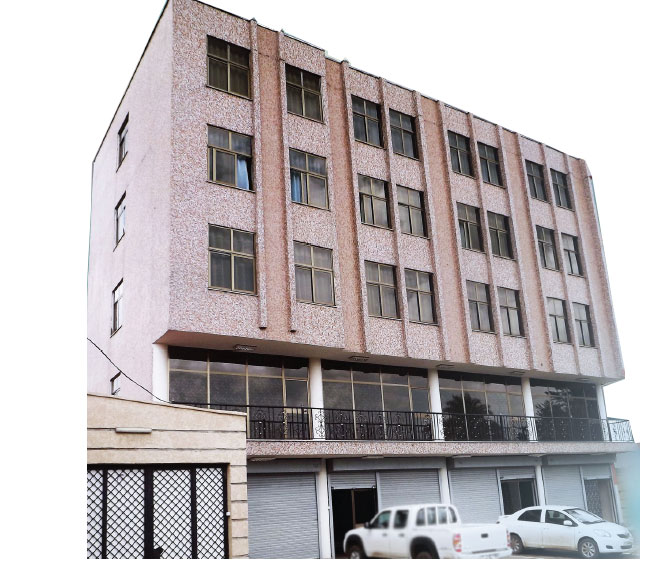
- Science and Technology Information Center headquarter in Addis Ababa
- Formation: 15 December 2011; 14 years ago
- Purpose: Science and research center
- Headquarters: Addis Ababa, Ethiopia
- Coordinates: 9.023838°N 38.754955°E
- Director-general: Fisseha Yitageshu
- Website: Official website

The Science and Technology Information Center (STIC) is an Ethiopian organisation which provides information to support scientific and technological (S&T) activities in the country. STIC has published information on the financing of research and development and on the nature and progress of innovative projects, and in 2014 was planning to introduce bibliometric monitoring of publications in S&T. The center has also provided information and communications technology facilities including a digital library, a patent information system, an automated personnel management system, and a S&T-related database.

== History ==
In 1977 the Ethiopian Science and Technology Commission (ESTC) was first to evolve with the plan to set up the National Scientific and Technological Information and Documentation Center (NSTIDC). The institution was designed as an apex body and agency for initiating, furthering, strengthening and coordinating various facilities and services concerning the collection, organization and dissemination of scientific and technological information.

On 7 May 1987, the UNESCO representative and liaison officer to the Organization of African Unity (OAU) and the Economic Commission for Africa (ECA), Awad Idris, visited Addis Ababa and gave full information about UNESCO's participation in the establishment of the center. There was no implementation of the plan at that time and onwards until the establishment of STIC.

Science and Technology Information Center (STIC) was established on 15 December 2011 with the passing of a Council of Ministers regulation. After locating its headquarter at Bulgaria mazoriya in Addis Ababa, Ethiopia, the center published the first "Science and Technology Indicators Report" in August 2014, and two science and technology books named "Tech-Science" in the same year. STIC continues to publish these tech books quarterly. STIC also has a weekly 25-minute television broadcast in collaboration with Ethiopian Television.

Ethiopia Science Technology and Innovation policy ratified in 2012 envisages the creation of a national framework that will define and support how Ethiopia will in future search for, selection, adaptation, and utilization appropriate and effective foreign technologies as well as addressing the establishment of national innovation system. The objective of the policy is to create a technology transfer framework that enables the building of national capabilities in technological learning, adaptation and utilization through searching, selecting and importing effective foreign technologies in manufacturing and service providing enterprises.

Eleven critical policy issues are identified, based on the national STI problem analysis and assessment of the characteristics of countries selected as benchmarks for their best practices. These are: technology transfer, human resource development, manufacturing and service providing enterprises, research, financing and incentive schemes, national quality infrastructure development, universities, research institutes, TVET institutions and industries linkage, intellectual property system, science and technology information, environmental development and protection, and international cooperation.

The governance structure of the national innovation system is being implemented in a way to lead, support and monitor the implementation of the policy. The main actors of innovation system are: National Science, Technology and Innovation Council; Ministry of Science and Technology (MoST); and other related ministries and Innovation Support and Research System.

=== Science and technology information ===
Collecting, organizing, analyzing, and disseminating information related to science and technology is of significant importance for successful technology transfer. In Ethiopia there is no well-organized science and technology information source or system as required by manufacturing and service providing enterprises, higher education, researcher institutes and other entities.

Despite the fact that there are certain types of information which are prepared and kept in the form of statistics, databases, indicators and bibliography, there were no mechanisms to publish and update them regularly. Therefore, it is imperative to develop and establish a national science and technology information system to fill the gaps and bring expected results, including the acceleration of technology transfer. Establishing and strengthen such a system will create a capacity that accelerates technology transfer through identifying, gathering, organizing, analyzing, disseminating and proper utilization of science and technology information. It is with this in mind that the government of Ethiopia established STIC under the direction of Abiy Ahmed Ali.

== Science and technology indicators ==
Science and technology (S&T) indicators are defined as a series of data designed to answer questions about S&T system, its internal structure, its relation with the economy and society and the degree to which it is meeting the goals of those who manage it, work within it, affected by its impacts. This is a reflection of the fact that changes in the national STI systems affect citizens who are industrialists, policy makers, researchers, government agencies, venture capitalists and other stakeholders involved in the understanding, as well as processing such as internalization and integration of public research, higher education, and other knowledge production nodes in the economy.

=== Research and experimental development (R&D) survey ===
Research and experimental development (R&D) is one of the science and technology indicators. It comprises creative work undertaken on a systematic basis in order to increase the stock of knowledge, including knowledge of man, culture and society, together with the use of this stock of knowledge to devise new applications. The term R&D covers three activities: basic research, applied research and experimental development. In Ethiopia, the first national survey of R&D was undertaken by the Ministry of Science and Technology in 2009. In 2013 STIC was mandated to conduct this survey and also conducted the second national survey of R&D in 2014.

The survey covered areas which show Ethiopia's investment and human resource on R&D in four sectors: government, higher education, business enterprises and private non-profits (PNP). The 2014 survey indicated that the share of gross domestic expenditure on research and experimental development (GERD) to the GDP, or R&D intensity of the country was 0.61%. This result is not far from the continental target of 1% and shows a threefold surge compared to that of 2010 R&D intensity (0.24%).

=== Innovation survey ===
Innovation is also one of the science and technology indicators. It is defined as implementation of a new or significantly improved: product (good or service), process, a new marketing method, a new organizational method in business practices, workplace organization, external relations. Innovations are fundamental to economic growth, development and the well-being of nations. There are four types of innovations: product innovations, process innovations, marketing innovations and organizational innovations.

In Ethiopia, national survey of innovation has not been conducted. But, since the Science and Technology Information center (STIC) is mandated in 2013 to conduct this survey, it is conducting national survey of innovation in 2014. The national innovation survey collects information about product and process innovation as well as organizational innovation and marketing innovation during a three-year reference period11. The principal variables collected relate to: product innovation, turnover from new market and new to firm product innovation, process innovation, ongoing and abandoned innovation, innovation expenditure, innovation co-operation, innovation hampering factors, innovation objectives, organizational innovation, marketing innovation and creativity and skills.

=== Bibliometrics ===
Bibliometrics is also one of the science and technology indicators. It is finding information patterns by analyzing citation patterns analyzing word use frequencies using statistical analysis. Bibliometrics is the application of quantitative analysis and statistics to publications such as journal articles and their accompanying citation counts. Quantitative evaluation of publication and citation data is now used in almost all nations around the globe with a sizeable science enterprise.

Bibliometrics is used in research performance evaluation, especially in university and government labs, and also by policymakers, research directors and administrators, information specialists and librarians, and researchers’ themselves. The purpose of Bibliometrics is to make quantitative analysis of science and technology performance, quantitative analysis of the cognitive and organizational structure of science and technology and to know how a certain science or technology has evolved in a certain period of time. Bibliometrics analysis has not been conducted in Ethiopia; in 2014, however, STIC was planning to conduct it.

== ICT systems ==
=== Golgule search engine ===
The center recently published a science and technology focused search database employing an advanced data mining technology that supports local languages. Golgule search engine also features photos and videos, press conferences via online streaming, promotional and instructional materials, including technology videos for livelihood.

=== National digital library ===
STIC is hosting Ethiopia's first national science and technology digital library. It provides custom-picked educational resources that are used to meet the country's academic and knowledge needs. With emphasis on the sciences, technology, and engineering as well as humanities and arts, it boasts a large collection of e-books. It targets formal and informal, institutional and individual, in local, state and national customers. The digital library employs tools like optical character recognition and has a pioneering OCR system developed to work with local language, Amharic.

=== Patent information management system ===
In collaboration with EIPO (Ethiopian Intellectual Property Office), STIC hosts a patent information storage, searching and retrieval system for local as well as international patents. International patents so far include the US patents, Japanese and Chinese patents. It also hosts locally registered PIs. The patent platform has multiple query generation processes, organized according to priority areas for technology transfer; it also supports the Amharic language.

=== Data center ===
The center has its own datacenter where it hosts all its public as well as private services for its stakeholders. This data-center subsumes standard data center equipment including high end servers, storage servers; network attached storages as well as network connectivity and integration accessories.

=== Office automation ===
The center has focused its resources at the beginning on internal automation and seamless operation. Through this focus, it has produced two automation systems for the country: HRMS (Human Resource Management System) and BSC (Balanced Scored Card). HRMS, through its web-based interface, automates payroll and benefits, personnel information, leave/attendance management, performance appraisals, etc. The second BSC system also focuses on employee management, but from a performance point of view, using the international balanced score card scheme. It is also web-based and helps report the progress of the organization as a whole as well as measure the performances of departments, teams and individuals in a scientific manner.
