= Ethio Telecom =

Ethiopian telecommunication company

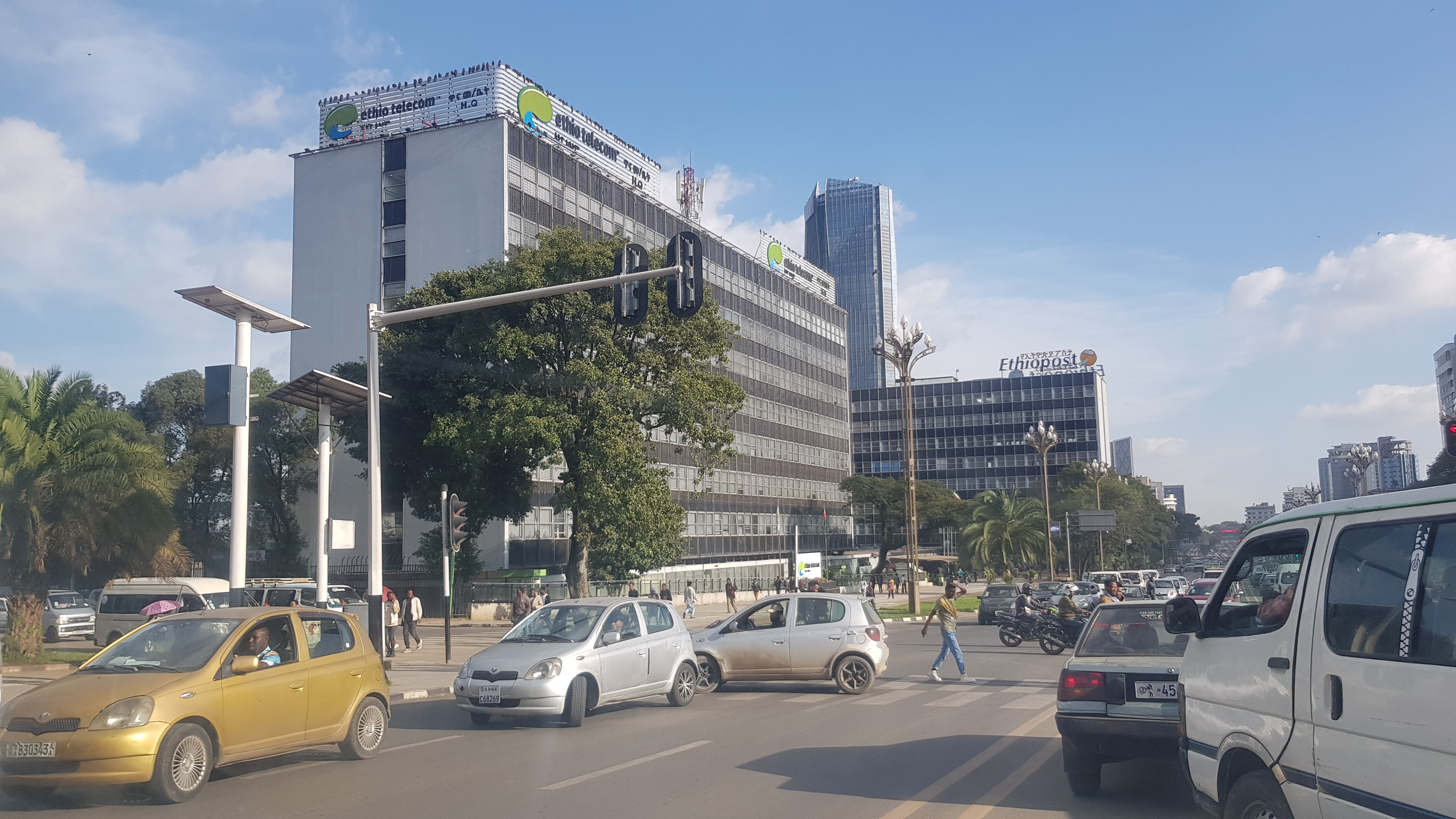
- Ethio telecom headquarter in Addis Ababa
- Native name: ኢትዮ ቴሌኮም
- Type: State-owned enterprise
- Industry: Telecommunications
- Predecessor: Ethiopian Telecommunications Corporation November 1894
- Founded: 29 November 2010; 15 years ago
- Headquarters: Addis Ababa, Ethiopia
- Area served: Ethiopia
- Key people: Frehiwot Tamiru (CEO)
- Services: Mobile; Fixed line; Broadband; Telebirr; Zemen Gebeya
- Revenue: ▲162 billion birr (2025)
- Operating income: ▲76 billion birr (2025)
- Net income: ▲18.0 billion birr (2023)
- Total assets: ▲329 billion birr (2025)
- Total equity: 119 billion birr
- Number of employees: 39,994
- ASN: 24757
- Website: www.ethiotelecom.et

Ethio telecom (stylised as Ethio telecom; Amharic: ኢትዮ ቴሌኮም), previously known as the Ethiopian Telecommunications Corporation (Amharic: የኢትዮጵያ ቴሌኮሙኒኬሽን ኮርፖሬሽን, ETC), is an Ethiopian telecommunication company serving as the major internet, telephone and digital services provider. Ethio Telecom, owned by the Ethiopian government, historically held a monopoly over telecommunication services in Ethiopia. Based in Addis Ababa, it is one of the "Big-5" group of state owned corporations in Ethiopia, along with Ethiopian Airlines, the Commercial Bank of Ethiopia, Ethiopian Insurance Corporation, and the Ethiopian Shipping Lines.

Ethio telecom was managed, on a management contract arrangement from 2010 to 2013, by France Télécom, and was required to comply with Ethiopian government orders. The government said it outsourced the management as ETC was not able to meet the demands of the fast-growing country. It also said that telecommunications services would not be privatized, at least not in the near future. Ethio telecom generates a revenue of over US$2.1 billion for the Ethiopian government, and was dubbed a "cash cow" by the previous Prime Minister Hailemariam Desalegn.

== History ==
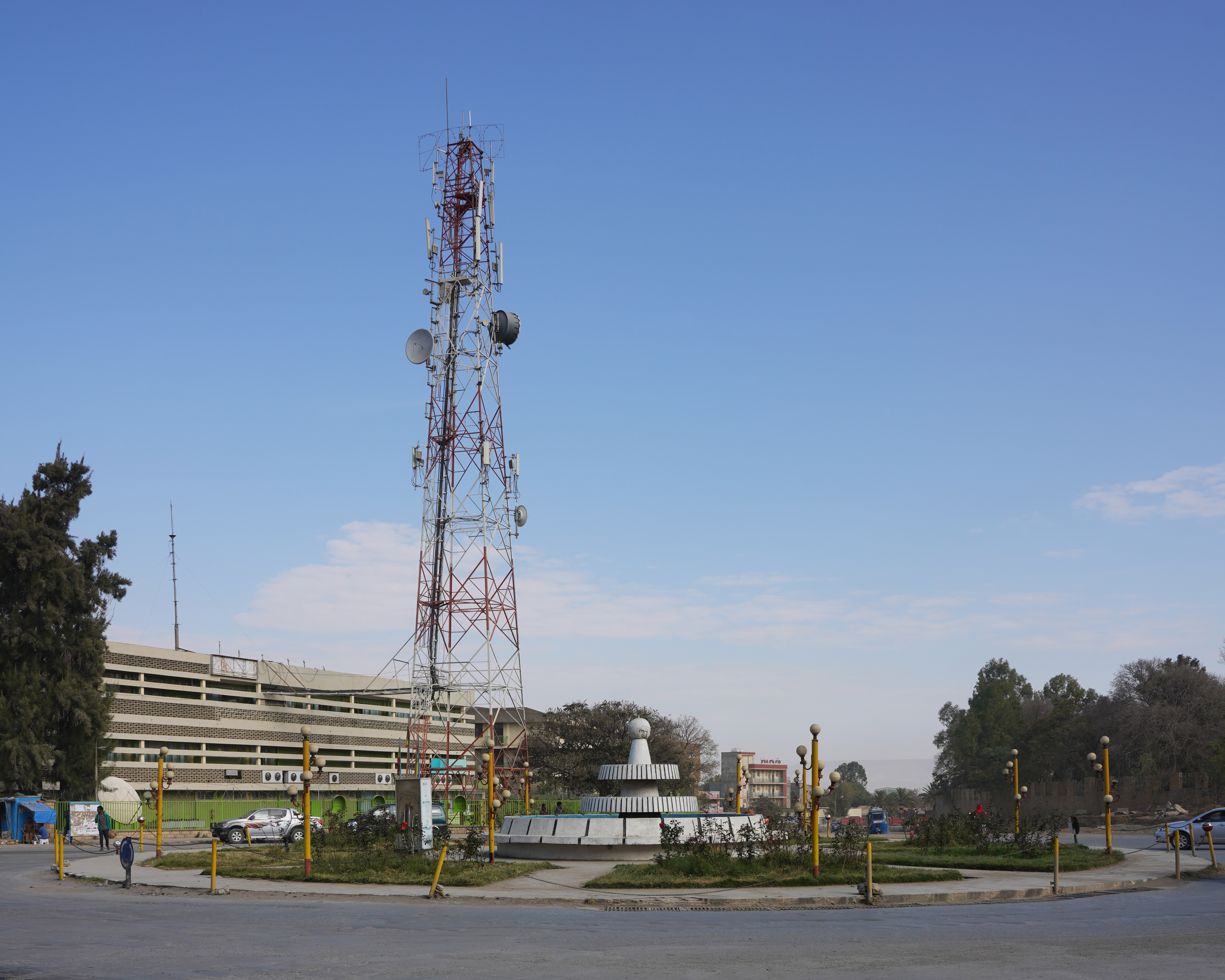
Ethio telecom building and antenna mast in Mekelle

Originally a division of the Ministry of Post, Telephone and Telegraph, what would become the ETC was established as the Imperial Board of Telecommunications of Ethiopia (IBTE) by proclamation No. 131/52 in 1952. Under the Derg regime, the IBTE was reorganized as the Ethiopian telecommunications service in October 1975, which was in turn reorganized in January 1981 as the Ethiopian Telecommunications Authority. In November 1996, the Ethiopian Telecommunications Authority became ETC by Council of Ministers regulation No. 10/1996. The subsequent Proclamation 49/1996 expanded the ETC's duties and responsibilities. For its international traffic links and communication services, ETC mainly uses its earth station at Sululta which transmits and receives to both the Indian Ocean and the Atlantic Ocean satellites. Engineering consulting firm Arup, were involved in the design and engineering of the early tower structures (during the 1970s).

In late 2006, the ETC signed an agreement worth US$1.5 billion with three Chinese companies, ZTE Corporation, Huawei Technologies and the Chinese International Telecommunication Construction Corporation, to upgrade and expand Ethiopian telecommunications services. This agreement will increase the number of mobile services from 1.5 million to 7 million, land line telephone services from 1 million to 4 million, and expansion of the fibre optic network, from the present 4,000 kilometers to 10,000 by 2010. It is part of a larger US$2.4 billion plan by the Ethiopian government to improve the country's telecommunications infrastructure. In 2018, the mobile service business has reached 85% of the country. In February 2018, it was reported that Ethio telecom had 64.4 million subscribers making it the largest telecommunication services operator in the continent. In August 2019, the company announced that it will install 4G network before other telecom companies enter the Ethiopian market since the government decided that it will liberalize the telecom sector.

Frehiwot Tamiru is serving as the current chief executive officer since 25 July 2018 replaced Andualem Admassie who served five years. Frehiwot previously worked as Deputy CEO for Internal Support Service for then Ethiopian Telecommunication Corporation. She told Capital that she managed all surveillance quality protocols.

By 26 August 2020, Ethio telecom planned to extended 842 new infrastructure site during 2020 fiscal year. This infrastructure expected to enable the company to host additional 5.2 million new customers. During this fiscal year, the company planned to generate 55.5 billion birr in revenue, a 16pc growth from the last fiscal year. It also plans to boost the country's telecom density to 51.3%. At the end of financial year 2021/22 it generated a revenue of 61.3 billion birr and boosted the country's telecom density to 63.3% after total subscribers reached 66.59 million.

In May 2021, Ethio telecom launched Telebirr, a mobile service platform. Frehiwot said 21.8 million users signed up with this service, making total transaction of 30.3 billion birr. On 10 May 2022, Ethio telecom commenced 5G network for pre-commercial sale in partnership of Huawei Technologies after several months upgrading the predecessor 4G network. In October 2024, Ethio telecom announced to sell its 10% stakes to citizens after formalization of transition to share company on 21 June 2024. The CEO of Ethio telecom Frehiwot Tamiru explained that buyers can purchase up to 3,333 shares with maximum amount of total investment of 990,000 birr. She noted that such purchase would incur taxes and service fees.

== Network and infrastructure ==
=== Cellular ===
Ethio Telecom's national network infrastructure consists of 10,000 plus mobile towers providing geographical coverage to 86.5% of the country. The company 4G/LTE service has reached 70.8% of the population and its 5G service is available in 26 cities in by June 2025. While network availability has expanded significantly, a prominent "usage gap" persists, as highlighted by industry analysis from the GSMA. The GSMA reports that only 26% of the population covered by mobile broadband are active users. Primary barriers include low penetration of smart phones, lack of digital skills, and limited access to critical infrastructure, particularly electricity.

List of supported cellular systems
System	Frequency	Technology
GSM(2G)	900 MHz(E-GSM)	GPRS, EDGE
UMTS(3G)	2100 MHz(B1)	HSPA+
LTE(4G)	1800 MHz(B3)	LTE+
5G NR	3500 MHz(n78)	-

=== Internet ===
Ethio telecom runs fiber cables through Sudan, Djibouti, Kenya, and Somaliland terminating to the Eastern Africa Submarine Cable System. In 2025, the total capacity of the four lines achieved 1.83 terabits per second data transfer rate and the overall length of inland fiber cables increased to a total of 23,000 kilometers.

Ethio telecom's Network has marginal support for IPv6.

=== International ===
Ethio Telecom's total international gateway (IGW) capacity stands at 2.48 Tbit/s, following an expansion of 840 Gbit/s during the 2024/2025 fiscal year to support growing data traffic. A significant portion of this bandwidth, 1.24 Tbit/s, is provided through locally deployed cache servers that host content from major international platforms like Meta, Netflix, and TikTok within the country. This strategy is aimed at enhancing user experience by reducing latency and speeding up access to popular global content.

=== Landline ===
Ethio telecom has 765,500 fixed landline telephone subscribers as of 2025. The company replaced 910 MSAGs(devices that connect telephone lines to the internet) and added 202 new ones that same year.

=== Data centers ===
The company has two data centers consuming 4.2 MW, primarily used to serve its mobile money service.

== Products and services ==
=== Mobile ===
Ethio telecom is the largest mobile operator in Africa serving 83.2 million voice call subscribers and 46.6 million mobile data users as of 2025.

=== Broadband internet ===
Ethio telecom is the exclusive provider of fixed broadband internet services in the country with its broadband Internet customer base reaching more than 847 thousand.

=== DNS and hosting ===
The company operates DNS resolutions and registrations for the .et TLD. It also provides hosting services for businesses and individuals in its data centers. In 2021 The company commissioned a modern data center built by the Chinese ICT company Huawei.

=== Mobile money ===
In May 2021 Ethio telecom launched its mobile money service Telebirr. As of 2025 the service is the largest mobile money service provider in the country with 54.8 million users and transacted 4.9 trillion birr. Customers of the ethio telecom can access the service through an app or through USSD codes for feature phones. The service lets customers send or receive money, buy mobile airtime, get micro loans, pay for utility bills, pay for government institution's fees and other financial services. The smartphone app also lets other third parties to integrate their services in the form of a mini app.

=== Digital Market Place ===
Ethio launched the Zemen Gebeya Digital Market Place in 2015.

However, this move by the state-owned telecom giant has sparked fear among small businesses and existing e-commerce startups. Many are concerned that Ethio telecom's vast resources, extensive subscriber base, and integration with its own mobile money service could create a monopoly, making it difficult for smaller players to compete and potentially stifling the nascent e-commerce ecosystem. While some entrepreneurs see potential for collaboration and leveraging the platform's reach, a palpable apprehension remains that Zemen Gebeya could discourage small businesses rather than empowering them as intended.

== Controversies ==
In October 2022, Safaricom, a leading telecommunications company in Kenya, commenced operations in Ethiopia following the government's liberalization of the telecom sector. This change allowed users to choose between two telecom providers. Sources indicate that the competition forced Ethio Telecom to massively enhance its products and services while reducing prices. The company's CEO talked about the improvement saying "It's about our survival"

The Ethiopian government has delayed the approval of Safaricom's mobile money transfer service, M-Pesa, which has been highly successful across East Africa. Currently, 602 governmental institutions and 1,447 petrol stations accept payments solely through Telebirr. Combined with two-year head start telebirr had, this resulted in poor adoption of M-Pesa with just 3.1 million subscribers as of 2023 as compared to telebirr's 54.8 million subscribers.

In December, Ethio Telecom accused Safaricom Ethiopia of causing significant damage to its international communication line running through Djibouti, as well as to its service lines in the Afar region, due to construction activities on the line.

Safaricom Ethiopia shares infrastructure of Ethiotelecom, this generated 743.6 million birr in revenue for the state-owned company during the first half of 2023.

== Censorship ==
According to reports by the OpenNet Initiative and Freedom House, the Ethiopian government through Ethio telecom imposes nationwide, politically motivated internet filtering. Under a 2012 law regulating the telecommunication industry, attempts by journalists to circumvent Ethio telecom surveillance and censorship of the internet could be interpreted as a criminal offense carrying a prison sentence of up to 15 years.

Most blocked sites are those run by Ethiopians in the diaspora who are highly critical of the government, however, Ethio telecom has also intermittently blocked access to other sites. In 2008, the Committee to Protect Journalists site was blocked for several months after it reported the arrest and beating of the editor-in-chief of The Reporter. For almost two years following the 2005 elections, Ethio telecom, which is also the sole telephone provider in the country, blocked mobile phone text-messaging. The government accused the Coalition for Unity and Democracy, the largest electoral opposition at the time, of coordinating anti-government demonstrations using text messages. Ethio telecom resumed messaging service in September 2007.

== See also ==
- Telecommunications in Ethiopia
- Internet in Ethiopia
- Safaricom Telecommunications Ethiopia
- Information Network Security Agency
