= Kenea Yadeta =

Ethiopian politician

- Qana'aa Yaadataa

Ministry of Defense
- In office 18 August 2020 – 6 October 2021
- President: Sahle-Work Zewde
- Prime Minister: Abiy Ahmed
- Preceded by: Lemma Megersa
- Succeeded by: Abraham Belay

Personal details
- Born: Ethiopia
- Party: Independent
- Other political affiliations: Ethiopian People's Revolutionary Democratic Front

Kenea Yadeta (Oromo: Qana'aa Yaadataa; Amharic: ቀነዓ ያደታ) is an Ethiopian politician and who has served as the Minister of Defense from 2020 to 2021.

== Biography ==
Kenea Yadeta studied administration and holds a PhD in Public Management, a Master's in Public & Constitutional Law, in Public Administration, and in Business Administration. He served in the Ethiopian Federal Police as Deputy Commissioner General, as Head of Security and Administration Bureau, and security chief of Oromia Region. On 18 August 2020, he was appointed by Ethiopian Prime Minister Abiy Ahmed as Minister of Defense amid a controversy between his predecessor and the prime minister. He became a key figure in the Tigray War. He was succeeded by Abraham Belay, former head of the Transitional Government of Tigray on 6 October 2021.
