= Telebirr =

Mobile payment service in Ethiopia

- Developer: Huawei; Ethio telecom
- Launched: 11 May 2021
- Operating systems: Android; iOS
- Status: Active
- Website: Telebirr

Telebirr (Amharic: ቴሌብር) is a mobile payment service developed and was launched by Ethio telecom, the state owned telecommunication and Internet service provider in Ethiopia. It took five months to develop the end-to-end service. It facilitates the delivery of cashless transactions. The platform deployed currently has the capacity of processing up to 100 transactions per second (TPS) and can be scaled up to 1000 TPS. The service is accessible via SMS, USSD, and smartphone applications. Telebirr works in five languages.

== Services ==
Though the service is fully accessible for any customer of Ethio telecom, the users need to register through the mobile application called Telebirr or using an authorized agent or Ethio telecom shop or Unstructured Supplementary Service Data (USSD), *127# nationally. However, Telebirr also provides a “quick registration” by using any information that already exists in Ethio telecom's system.
