= Addis Neger (website) =

Ethiopian daily news website

- Founded: August 4, 2006
- Language: Amharic
- Headquarters: Maryland
- Website: www.addisneger.com

Addis Neger was an Ethiopian daily news website published in Maryland, USA, for a worldwide Ethiopian audience. It was the largest metropolitan website available for the Ethiopian diaspora.

== Overview ==
Founded on August 4, 2006, the site was rated the number one Ethiopian news web site in 2008. However, it was not connected to the popular Addis Neger private newspaper in Ethiopia.

The original Addis Neger news outlet was founded in 2005 by two political science students in Ethiopia. After the government arrested one of the students, the other fled to the U.S. and established the website in 2006 in order to publicize the political and social situation in Ethiopia. The names of the members were purposely kept hidden until the imprisoned student is released.
