= Ethiopian Insurance Corporation =

Ethiopian state-owned organization

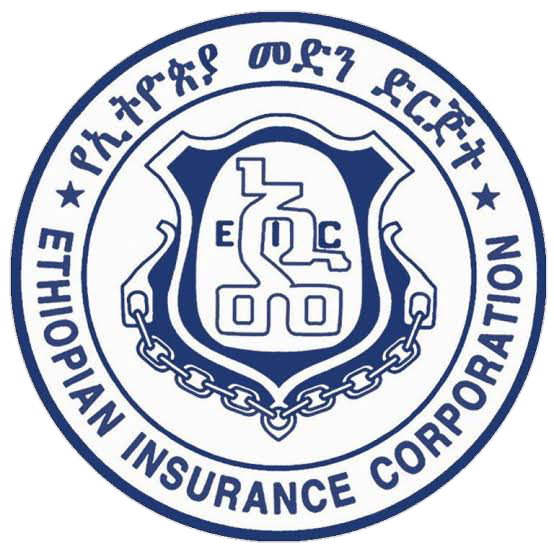
- Abbreviation: EIC
- Formation: 1 January 1976; 50 years ago
- Type: Governmental
- Purpose: Insurance company
- Headquarters: Leghar, Addis Ababa, Ethiopia
- Owner: Ethiopian Investment Holdings
- Website: Official website

The Ethiopian Insurance Corporation (Amharic: የኢትዮጵያ ኢንሹራንስ ኮርፖሬሽን; EIC) is a state-owned insurance corporation headquartered in Leghar, Addis Ababa, Ethiopia. It was established in 1976 with initial capital of 11 million (US$1.29 million) after taking over the thirteen nationalized private insurance companies liabilities and assets. The Ethiopian Insurance Corporation is a subsidiary of Ethiopian Investment Holdings (EIH), the sovereign wealth fund of Ethiopia.

== History ==
The Ethiopian Insurance Corporation (EIC) was established on 1 January 1976 by proclamation No. 68/1975 by emerging takeover of the thirteen nationalized private insurance companies liabilities and assets, with birr 11 million (US$1.29 million) paid up capital.

It is state-owned and profitable organization. As of August 2023, the Corporation profits plunged up to 1.4 trillion birr.
