= Addis Neger (newspaper) =

Ethiopian weekly newspaper founded in 2007

Addis Neger (Amharic "New Thing") was an Ethiopian weekly newspaper founded in 2007 by six journalists. It rapidly rose to prominence due to its presentations of credible and researched viewpoints before its sudden closure in December 2009. It was one of the few independent voices in Ethiopia. In 2009 all of Addis Neger's editors, including managing editor Mesfin Negash, executive editor, Abiye Teklemariam, editor-in-chief Tamerat Negera and other contributors and writers quietly slipped out of the country, fleeing from intimidation.

== Closing ==
Allegedly, criminal charges were being prepared and the staff of Addis Neger were threatened.

In early December 2009, when all six of its founding editors were safely outside of the country, they announced the closing down of their newspaper. They claimed that they had learned that the government was preparing to bring charges against them. It was the culmination of "months of persecution and harassment", they said in a final statement. They feared that the Ethiopian government was planning a repeat of the crackdown that imprisoned thousands of people after the disputed 2005 election. Military and police officers killed about 200 opposition protesters, and many journalists and politicians were jailed for the next two years. According to Reporters Without Borders, websites that criticized the government were blocked, and even text messaging on cellphones was restricted.

The closure of the paper caused donor countries to issue statements of concern. The European Union called for investigation of the allegation and those responsible to be held accountable. The U.S. Embassy issued a statement on December 10 expressing concern that such moves "contribute to a perception that space for independent media in Ethiopia is constrained.".

The Ethiopian authorities dismissed the allegations and claimed that Addis Neger's decision had ulterior political and personal intentions. In an official statement released by the country's foreign ministry, the government said that the closure of the newspaper was intended to feed false accusations that independent media space in Ethiopia was constrained
