= Ethiopian Securities Exchange =

Primary securities exchange in Ethiopia

Ethiopian Securities Exchange (ESX)
- Type: Public-private Company
- Location: Addis Ababa, Ethiopia
- Founded: 2025
- Owner: Public-private partnership, 25% owned by Ethiopian Investment Holdings
- Key people: Founding CEO Tilahun E.Kassahun, current CEO Yodit Kassa. Founding Board Chairman, Helaway Tadesse, Current Board Chairman; Brook Taye (Chairman)
- No. of listings: 6, ref ESX website

The Ethiopian Securities Exchange (ESX) is the sole securities exchange in Ethiopia. Its establishment is part of a broader initiative by the Ethiopian government to enhance the country's financial infrastructure and provide a platform for businesses and investors to engage in securities trading. The development of the ESX is in line with the government's objective to diversify the financial sector and offer more investment opportunities to both domestic and foreign investors.

== History ==
The concept of a securities exchange in Ethiopia is not entirely new. In 1960, Ethiopia initiated its journey into share trading by establishing an institutional framework and inaugurating a share exchange department within the State Bank of Ethiopia. As the share market grew, the Share Trading Group was formed in 1965. This group consisted of six institutions that traded shares among themselves through open bidding. This initiative positioned Ethiopia among a select group of African nations with a comprehensive stock market. However, this early attempt at establishing a stock market came to a halt in 1974 when major companies and financial institutions were nationalized and brought under government control.

Establishing a securities exchange in Ethiopia has been planned for several years. The Ethiopian government has made efforts since 2019 for this vision. In 2023, the country announced the upcoming launch of its first-ever securities exchange.

A project office led by the country's newly established sovereign wealth fund (the Ethiopian Investment Holdings - EIH) and FSD Africa was given responsibility to set up ESX. Following months-long market sensitization and capital-raising efforts, ESX attracted more than 5O shareholders, including the majority of the commercial banks and insurance companies as investors. April 7, 2024, NGX Group confirmed an investment in the Ethiopia Securities Exchange. Its capital raise was oversubscribed by 240%.

On January 10, 2025, the ESX launched with Wegagen Bank as the first company listed. Chief executive Tilahun Kassahun, projected that 90 companies would join within 10 years.

== Purpose ==
ESX aims to provide a fundraising platform mainly for small and medium-sized enterprises, the backbone of the Ethiopian economy. This initiative seeks to revitalize the financial market and unlock Ethiopia's economic potential.

== Regulatory body ==
The Ethiopian Capital Market Authority (ECMA) supervises ESX. ECMA is responsible for safeguarding investors' interests, overseeing systemic risks and supporting market development.

== Future prospects ==
ESX will enable trading of existing securities, kindling a secondary market in Ethiopia. The Ethiopian Proclamation (No. 1248/2021) states that the government, in collaboration with the private sector, including foreign investors, will establish the exchange. Its launch was seen as a catalyst for private sector investment. It will act as a privatization platform for Ethiopia's state-owned enterprises and assist businesses, including SMEs, in capital raising. The ESX also plans to trade various financial instruments.

== Key stakeholders and partnerships ==
Several stakeholders and partners contribute to the ESX's development and launch:

- Economic Commission for Africa (ECA): Supports African countries in socioeconomic development.
- Ethiopian Investment Holdings (EIH): A state-owned company leading the ESX establishment.
- FSD Africa: Collaborates with the Ethiopian Government, offering technical support, legal counsel, and funding for the stock exchange.
- Ethiopian Capital Market Authority (ECMA): Prepares the legal framework and supports the ESX launch.
- NGX Group: The main stock exchange in Nigeria and one of the main institutional investors of Ethiopian Securities Exchange.

== See also ==
- List of African stock exchanges
