= Betelhem Dessie =

Ethiopian web and mobile technologies developer

- Portrait of Betelhem Dessie (2024)
- Born: 1999 (age 26–27); Harar, Harari Region, Ethiopia
- Occupation: Software developer

Betelhem Dessie (Amharic: ቤተልሔም ደሴ; born 1999) is an Ethiopian web and mobile technologies developer. She has been named "the youngest pioneer in Ethiopia's fast emerging tech scene" by CNN. Currently, she is the CEO of gheero.

== Early life ==
Betelhem was born in 1999 and raised in Harar, Ethiopia. Her interest in technology began at an early age while spending time in her father’s electronics shop, where she first interacted with computers and digital tools.

At nine years old, she began assisting customers by transferring audio and video files, earning her first income and deepening her curiosity about computers. During this time, she was also active in her community, participating in campaigns on global warming in schools and advocating for traffic safety around her neighborhood, experiences that shaped her sense of social responsibility. As she spent more time at the shop, Betelhem taught herself video editing, basic computer maintenance, and mobile software installation. By the age of ten, she had begun learning Visual Basics 6 and exploring introductory programming concepts independently using books she obtained from nearby colleges.

Alongside her schoolwork, she shared her growing skills with classmates by teaching them basic computer literacy. At the age of ten, Betelhem moved to Addis Ababa under a government sponsorship to join the Information Network Security Agency (INSA), where she further developed her coding and programming skills while working on real-life projects and interacting with technology professionals. During her teenage years, she started working with iCog Labs, Ethiopia’s first artificial intelligence and robotics research lab, her engagement with the company provided her first exposure to artificial intelligence and applied research, reinforcing her interest in technology as a tool for social impact. Later as her career progressed, she was the CEO of iCog (formerly iCog Anyone Can Code), an organization focused on democratizing access to technology through training, consultancy, and product development.

She later worked with Tecno Mobile Ethiopia, where she engaged in mobile application development and gained experience with applied software projects. Betelhem continued to develop her technical and teaching abilities through roles in STEM training programs, including as a trainer at Bahir Dar University’s STEM center and mentoring high school students in the Girls Can Code initiative supported by the U.S. Embassy in Addis Ababa. Her practical education further evolved through entrepreneurial work, including co-founding The REMUS with her friends in Bahirdar, the startup behind the Askuala platform, connecting parents and teachers. Through this experience, she deepened her understanding of product development, system design, and user focused technology solutions.

== Career ==
Betelhem’s career spans technology development, entrepreneurship, and innovation leadership, with a focus on youth empowerment, digital skills, and artificial intelligence. She began her professional journey at just ten years old as a junior software developer at the Information Network Security Agency (INSA) in Addis Ababa, gaining experience in programming, system maintenance, and basic digital infrastructures. This early exposure to national IT operations informed her later interest in technology education and community-driven innovation. After INSA, she moved to Bahir Dar, where she contributed to building a digital library at the Bahir Dar University STEM center and co-founded the startup The REMUS which developed Askuala, an educational technology platform connecting teachers, students, and parents. Betelhem contributed to product development, platform design, and community engagement, marking her entry into technology entrepreneurship. She later participated in the US Embassy-supported Girls Can Code initiative, mentoring teenage girls in programming and digital creativity, broadening women’s participation in technology.

Betelhem began working with iCog Labs in 2016, when she joined the organization as an intern. She later took on advisory responsibilities supporting youth innovation activities, including the design and coordination of national competitions focused on robotics, AI-related problem-solving, and social-impact technology. Her work contributed to growing the visibility of Ethiopia’s emerging technology ecosystem. In the same year, the lab launched iCog Anyone Can Code (iCog-ACC), a program aimed at expanding access to digital skills for children and young people across Ethiopia. Betelhem played a central role as project lead, helping to structure training models, community outreach, and partnerships. The initiative was created to address the limited availability of accessible STEM education and has since developed into one of the country’s most recognized youth-tech training programs. As the program grew and Ethiopia’s tech ecosystem evolved, it became its own separate company from the Labs and expanded its focus beyond coding, embracing a broader mission that includes democratizing access to technology through training, consultancy, and product development. This evolution laid the foundation for the organization’s rebranding to just iCog, reflecting its emergence as a multifaceted company tackling real-world technological challenges.

Since 2020, she has served as Chief Executive Officer of the organization and Chief Advisor at the Lab, overseeing strategic direction, partnerships, and program expansion. In these roles, she has led initiatives promoting digital literacy, AI awareness, and youth inclusion, while supporting the organization’s transition and implementation of grassroots training programs, broader innovation, and research-focused projects. In 2026, following a change in ownership structure and Betelhem leaving iCog Labs, she took ownership and leadership of the organization as CEO, iCog was rebranded as gheero. The new entity, gheero, focuses on AI Solutions, Data Services, and Training & Consultancy. Beyond her executive work, Betelhem has contributed as a consultant to regional and international organizations. Her engagements have included advisory work for GSMA on digital readiness and skills ecosystems, support for youth employability and training frameworks at ALX Ethiopia, and contributions to entrepreneurship development and inclusive innovation in Ethiopia through the MESMER Programme.

== Projects ==
Betelhem has led and overseen technology and digital-skills initiatives in Ethiopia, including programs focused on coding education, digital literacy, artificial intelligence, and access to technology.

=== Leyu ===
Her project Leyu is an open-source crowdsourcing platform developed to support the creation of datasets for low-resource languages. The project has been used in natural-language processing and provides opportunities for participants to contribute to data-collection and related digital work.

=== for(her) ===
Betelhem's project for (her) is a coding education program aimed at girls in public high schools in Ethiopia. The initiative provides programming instruction and exposure to science, technology, engineering, and mathematics (STEM) fields, with a focus on increasing participation by girls in technology education.

=== Digitruck ===
Betelhem 's Digitruck focuses on solar-powered mobile classroom designed to provide digital education in remote and off-grid communities. The program uses a mobile learning environment to provide training in digital literacy and coding outside major urban centers.

=== Other projects ===
Betelhem has also been involved in Training Solution, a training-management platform designed to support large-scale professional-skills programs. The system provides tools for curriculum management, training logistics, participant tracking, and assessment and has been used in programs involving digital literacy, artificial intelligence, and vocational training.

Earlier in her career, Betelhem and her team operated Solve IT, a youth innovation competition in Ethiopia. She was also involved in Lucy, a technology-learning platform for girls, and Coding Summer Camp, a program that provided school-age students with introductory instruction in coding and robotics. The Coding Summer Camp was held over nine summers.

== Speaking engagements ==
Betelhem has represented Ethiopia and advocated for technology education, artificial intelligence for development, and youth inclusion at international forums and conferences.

In 2017, she participated in the Milken Institute Asia Summit in Singapore, sharing insights on emerging technologies and youth-led innovation.

In 2018, she was a speaker at multiple international events, including the Forum on Artificial Intelligence in Africa in Benguir, Morocco, and The Future of Africa: AI, Robotics & Education conference in Geneva, Switzerland, organized by UNESCO and IBE, highlighting her work in AI, robotics, and education. She also participated in the Afrobytes Conference in Paris, France.

In 2019, Betelhem delivered talks at the Abu Dhabi Sustainability Week in UAE, Mobile World Congress Barcelona, and the Global Change Award in Stockholm, Sweden, emphasizing inclusive innovation and AI applications. She also attended the World Economic Forum in Cape Town, South Africa, and spoke at the Deutsche Welle Global Media Forum in Bonn, Germany. During this year, she participated in the United Nations Economic Commission for Africa (UNECA) dinner for the launch of the Ethiopian chapter of the African Women Leaders Network, where she discussed youth technology initiatives.

In 2020, She has spoken at Women in Tech Sweden (WITswe), delivering a keynote on youth technology education and innovation.

In 2022, Betelhem spoke at the UN World Geospatial Information Congress in Hyderabad, India, discussing digital inclusion and technology education for youth. At MWC Barcelona, she participated in a session titled “Behind the Scenes of AI: Shaping the Deep Tech Ecosystem for Impact”, highlighting her work on AI, education, and inclusive innovation. In 2024, she was a featured speaker at the Brilliant Minds conference.

== Focus areas ==
Betelhem Dessie's work has focused on AI applications, digital inclusion, and technology education in Ethiopia. Her projects have applied AI to agriculture, healthcare, and nutrition, including the development of Leyu, a crowdsourcing platform for linguistic datasets in Ethiopian languages. She has also supported technology training for children and young people through robotics, programming, and mobile ICT classrooms. Her initiatives include coding and robotics programs for girls, youth innovation competitions addressing local challenges, and training in data collection, annotation, and AI ethics.

== Awards and recognition ==
- 2012 – Best Project Award of the Year, Center of Excellence, Addis Ababa, Ethiopia
- 2015 - Askuala Web-Based Application, ICT CoE, AAU, MCIT - Second place for the educational platform developed by The Remus
- 2017 - Outstanding Girl of the Year, Ethiopian Girls Award (in collaboration with African Union, UNICEF, Child Fund, and Wings Education & Media)
- 2019 - Young Technologist, Tech Playmakers Award, Booking.com
- 2020 - Visionary Award, Society of Ethiopians Established in Diaspora (SEED) - Recognized for pioneering work in AI, coding, and robotics in Ethiopia.
- 2022 - Women of Excellence Award, Association for Women in Business (AWiB)
- 2023 - Professional Excellence Award, Bikila Awards
- 2024/2025 - Obama Africa Leader, The Obama Foundation.
- Featured in Rebel Girls: 100 Change Makers.
