= .et =

Internet country code top-level domain for Ethiopia

- Introduced: 15 October 1995
- TLD type: Country code top-level domain
- Status: Active
- Registry: Ethio Telecom
- Sponsor: Ethio Telecom
- Intended use: Entities connected with Ethiopia
- Actual use: Has some limited use in Ethiopia, sometimes used for typosquatting websites due to misspellings of .net
- Registration restrictions: Some second-level domains restricted to certain entities
- Structure: Registrations are made at the second- or third-level
- Documents: Service agreement
- DNSSEC: Yes
- Registry website: myportal.ethiotelecom.et

.et is the country code top-level domain (ccTLD) for Ethiopia. Ethio Telecom offer top-levels domains as second- and third-level domains.

Ethio Telecom, the state-owned telecommunication services provider of Ethiopia, is the registry operator of the domain, and is supported by the registry system developed by ZDNS, an internet infrastructure service provider from China.

== Second-level domains ==
A number of second-level domains for Ethiopia exist:

- .com.et, for commercial companies.
- .gov.et, reserved for governmental organizations.
- .org.et, for non-profit organizations and non-governmental organizations.
- .edu.et, reserved for educational institutions.
- .net.et, for network-related companies.
- .name.et, for individuals.
- .mil.et, for the Ethiopian National Defense Force
