= Ethiopia Museum of Art and Science =

Science museum in Addis Ababa, Ethiopia

Ethiopia Museum of Art and Science ጥበብ እና የሳይንስ ሙዚየም Godambaa Faayataa fi Mirkanbeekii Itoophiyaa ቤተ መዘከር ሥነ ጥበብን ሥነ ፍልጠትን ኢትዮጵያ
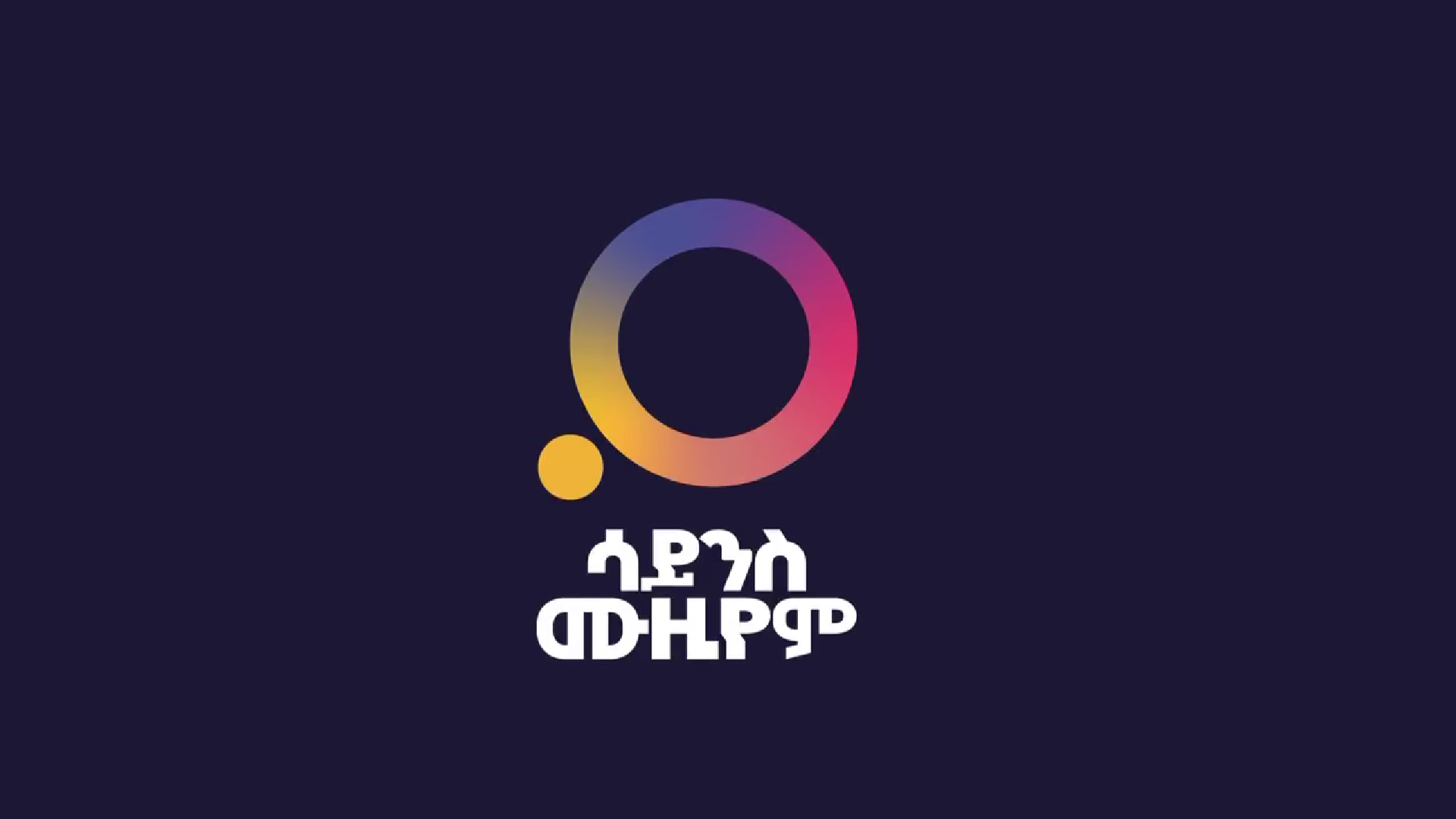

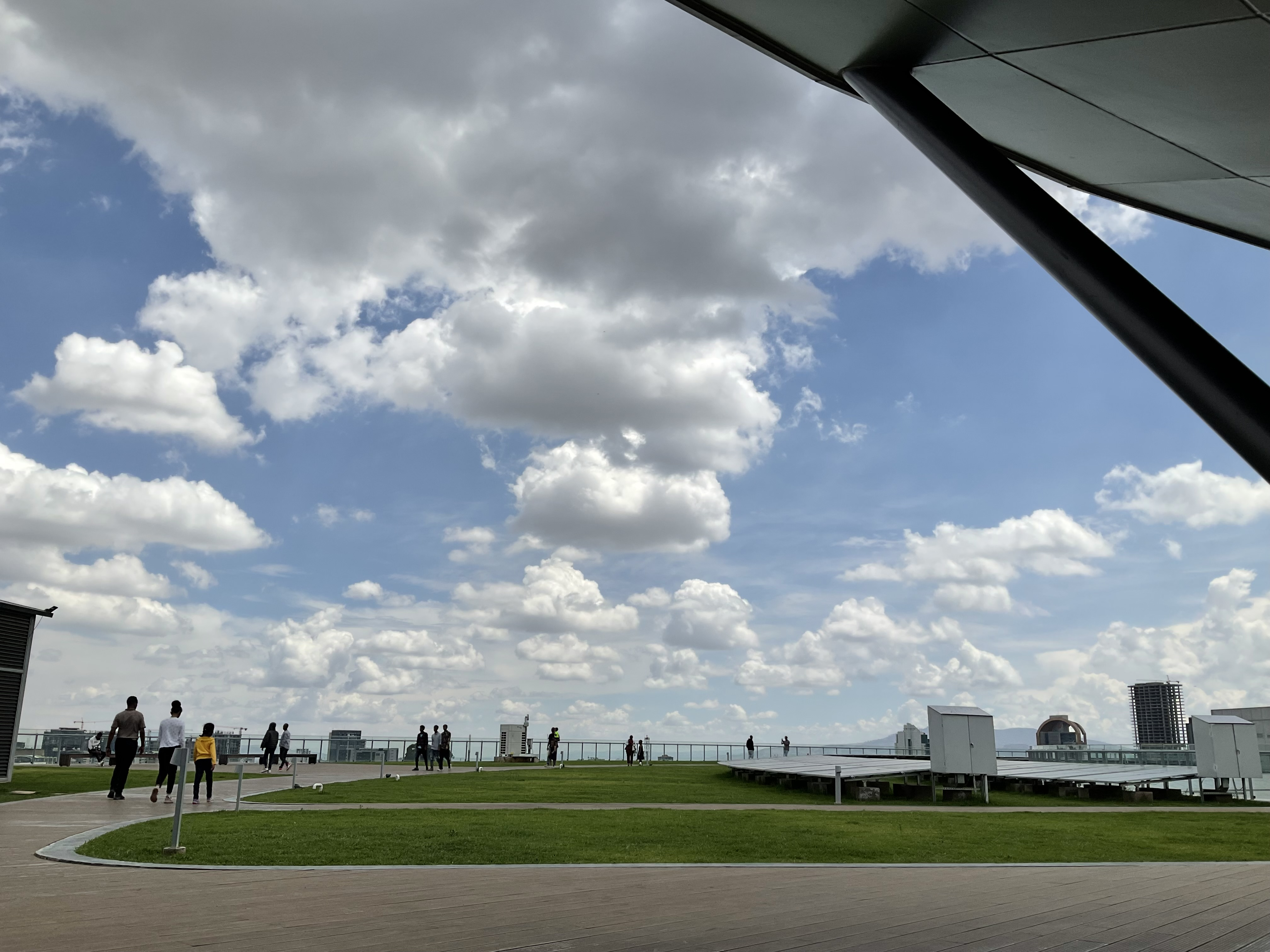
- Top floor of the science museum

General information
- Architectural style: Circular
- Location: Niger St, Addis Ababa, Ethiopia
- Coordinates: 9.0214°N 38.7624°E
- Inaugurated: 4 October 2022
- Cost: 1.1 billion birr

Height
- Height: 9 metres (30 ft)

Technical details
- Size: 15,000 m^{2} (160,000 sq ft)

The Ethiopia Museum of Art and Science is a 15,000,000 m^{2} (160,000,000 sq ft) lying science museum in Addis Ababa, Ethiopia. It was inaugurated by Prime Minister Abiy Ahmed along with other high-ranking officials on 4 October 2022. Part of Chinese aided Addis Ababa Riverside Development Project Phase II, the museum contains exhibition hall dedicated to scientific and developmental research. The museum lies on 6.78 hectares (16.8 acres) with 9-metre (30 ft) circular shape dubbed "ring of wisdom" to denote "human ability and skillfulness to create objects". In addition, the second room is dedicated to a three-dimensional theatre movie called Dome Theatre. The museum also contains several building complexes and interactive display screens, cybersecurity, finance, geographical information system (GIS), service industries, data analysis, manufacturing, and robotics.

During the inauguration, Abiy Ahmed highlighted the importance of the science museum for state-sponsored digital transformation in the country and promised that it would give opportunities for young people workshops.

== Description ==
The science museum was inaugurated by Prime Minister Abiy Ahmed and other high ranking government officials on 4 October 2022 in the hub of Addis Ababa. Part of Chinese aided Addis Ababa Riverside Green Development Project Phase II, the museum contains a science and technology exhibition hall dedicated for scientific and developmental research. Lying on 6.78 hectares (16.8 acres) resting, the 15,000 m^{2} (160,000 sq ft) 9-metre (30 ft) high museum exhibition area designed by circular shape dubbed "ring of wisdom" denoting "humanity's endless ability and capacity to continuously create".

The second portion of the museum is the Dome Theatre, a 450 m^{2} (4,800 sq ft) three-dimensional cinema 24-metre (79 ft) high and able to accommodate up to 200 people at once. The inauguration was coincided with Pan-African Conference on Artificial Intelligence 2022, acclaimed as progress towards envisioning the future of technology in Africa's digital transformation.

In the museum, there are several building complexes and interactive display screens in local solutions in healthcare, finance, cybersecurity, geographic information system (GIS), service industries, data analysis, manufacturing, and robotics. Abiy Ahmed highlighted the importance of the advance of science and technology, citing Ethiopia's Digital Economy Strategy, which operated two years prior. Abiy emphasized the necessity of Artificial Intelligence Institute as part of government institutions undertaking digital transformation in the country. Furthermore, Abiy promised that the museum would provide workshop opportunities for young people. The construction totally costed 1.1 billion birr($21.1 Million)
