= Ministry of Innovation and Technology (Ethiopia) =

Government ministry of Ethiopia

Agency overview
- Formed: December 1975
- Jurisdiction: Government of Ethiopia
- Headquarters: near Colson St, Addis Ababa, Ethiopia; 9.023822°N 38.755073°E
- Annual budget: 300 billion birr (as of 2021)
- Agency executive: Frehiwot Tamiru

The Ministry of Innovation and Technology (MinT) (formerly known as the Ministry of Science and Technology (MoST), Ministry of Communication & Information Technology, Ministry of Science and Technology) is an Ethiopian government department responsible for science and technological development in Ethiopia as well as a governing body of communications. It was established as a commission in December 1975 by directive No.62/1975. The current minister is Belete Molla since 2021.

== List of ministers ==
- October 2018 – February 2020: Dr.-Ing. Getahun Mekuria
- February 2020 – 6 October 2021: Abraham Belay
- 6 October 2021 – 8 October 2026: Belete Molla
- 8 October 2026 – present: Frehiwot Tamiru

== History ==
The Ministry of Science and Technology (MoST) was a governmental institution that was established for the first time in December 1975 by proclamation No.62/1975 as a commission. Following the change in government in 1991 and with the issuance of the new economic policy, the commission was re-established in March 1994 by Proclamation No.91/94. The commission went into its third phase of re-institution on 24 August 1995 by Proclamation No.7/1995, as an agency following the establishment of the Federal Democratic Republic of Ethiopia . The ministry changed its title to Ministry of Innovation and Technology in October 2018.

== Vision ==
To see Ethiopia entrench the capacities which enable rapid learning, adaptation and utilization of effective foreign technologies by the year 2022/23.

It has a mission of coordinating, encouraging and supporting science and technology activities that realize the country's social and economic developments.

== Affiliate organizations ==
- Ethiopian Technology and Innovation Institute
- Ethiopian Radiation and Protection Authority
- Ethiopian Space Science and Technology Institute
- Ethiopian Biotechnology Institute
- Geospatial Information Institute
