= Mesfin Negash =

Ethiopian journalist and commentator

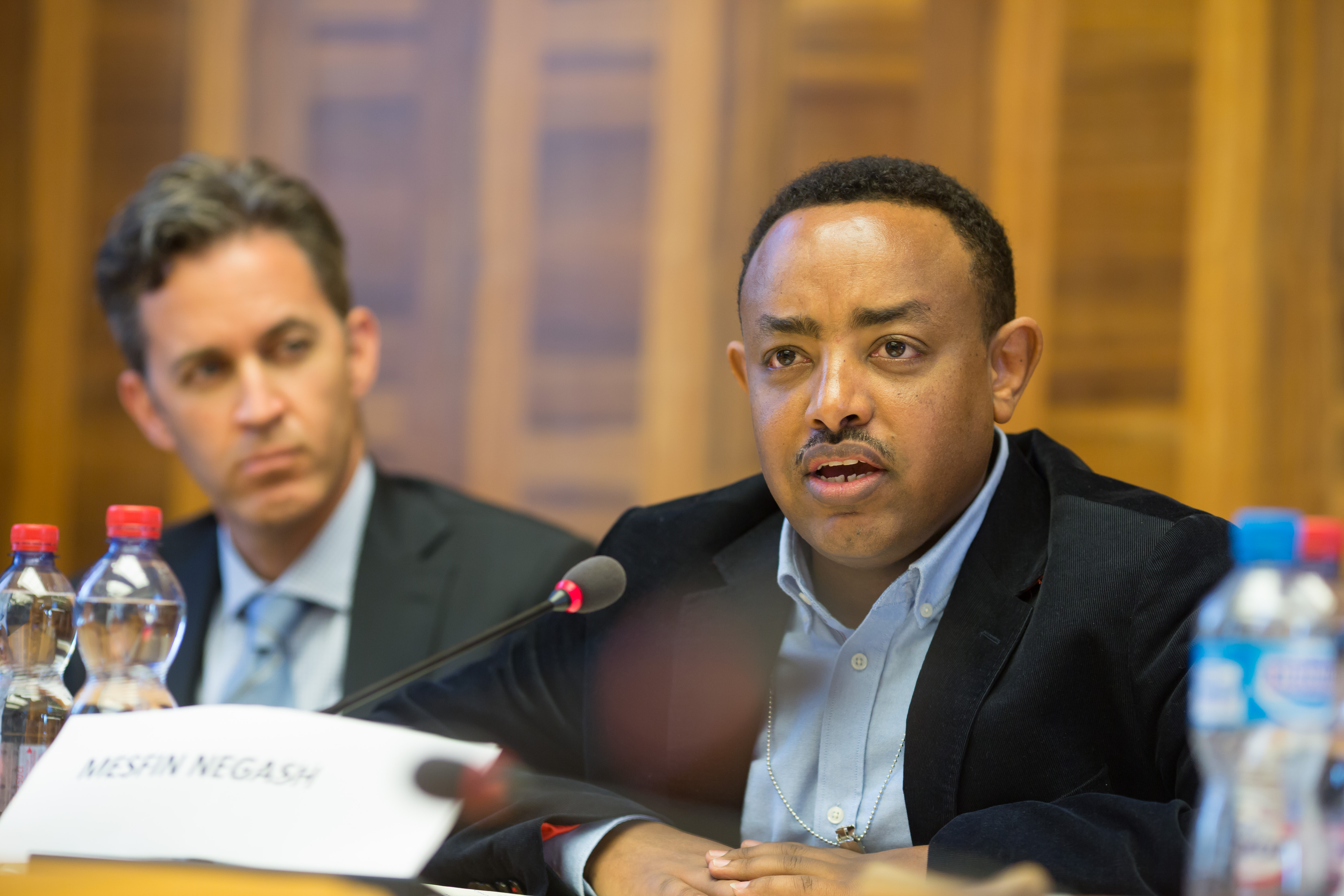
Mesfin Negash

Mesfin Negash (Amharic: መስፍን ነጋሽ) is an Ethiopian journalist, political commentator for Addis Neger and columnist for Sampsonia Way Magazine. He is a graduate of Addis Ababa University where he studied political science.

== Career ==
His career as a journalist started at the Ethiopian Reporter in 2001. He wrote on issues of politics and international relations. Before the controversial May 2005 elections, Negash left the newspaper to join Meznagna newspaper as a columnist while working for local and international NGO as a communication specialist and program officer. His political articles in Meznagna were most supportive of the Coalition for Unity and Democracy(CUD). In one of his articles, he opposed the early position of his former paper which called for the establishment of unity government in Ethiopia. Mesfin's contention was that the ruling party's democratic centralism is too much of an impediment for the formation of any governing coalition with it.

Meznagna was shut down in December 2005 by the government because it was first to publish the CUD's unconstitutional and illegal call for the removal of the government even though the paper itself didn't advocate for the forceful removal of the government.

In 2007 five former Meznagna journalists, including Mesfin Negash, established Addis Neger. He was the Editor-in-Chief of the paper for a year before he moved to a managerial position. Under Negash's watch Addis Neger grew to be one of Ethiopia's leading newspapers. The articles Negash wrote for the paper were milder in their tone and criticism of the government than his articles in Meznagna. The paper faced intimidation and harassment under Ethiopia's anti-terrorism law, which criminalizes any reporting that directly or indirectly “encourages” or provides “moral support” to “terrorist groups.”

In August 2008 an Ethiopian judge sentenced Mesfin Negash to a suspended one month imprisonment for a news report that appeared in the July 26 issue on the trial of iconic musician Teddy Afro. The ruling judge stated that they were compelled by law not to run the story because “it infringes on the reputation of the court.

In 2010 the staffers at Addis Neger shut down the newspaper and Negash fled Ethiopia, leaving his mother and wife behind. In February 2012 he was granted asylum in Sweden. He noted, “It wasn’t a single incident that pushed me to leave Ethiopia – it was numerous incidents over the course of several months." In May he was elected the Human Rights Defender of the Month by the Civil Rights Defenders campaign to protect human rights defenders at risk around the world.

In June 2012, Negash was found guilty of supporting terrorism along with 23 other defendants by an Ethiopian court and sentenced in absentia to eight years in prison. In a column for Sampsonia Way Magazine Negash commented on the conviction that “the sentences carry no practical consequences for the professional freedom of those ‘convicted’ living in exile” and that “anyone, Ethiopian or not, who supports the democratic hope of the nation in any manner is considered an enemy of the state, or a ‘terrorist.’”

Since May 2012 Negash has served as a columnist for the City of Asylum/Pittsburgh’s Sampsonia Way Magazine where he “shares Ethiopian views on pertinent issues related to journalism, culture, and, of course, the overarching subject of politics." He is also the Managing Editor of Addisnegeronline.com.
