= Ethiopian Telecommunication Agency =

Ethiopian government agency

Ethiopian Communications Authority
- የኢትዮጵያ ኮምኒኬሽን ባለስልጣን

Agency overview
- Formed: January 1981; 45 years ago
- Jurisdiction: Ethiopian government
- Headquarters: Bole subcity, Addis Ababa, Ethiopia
- Employees: 200–500
- Agency executive: Balcha Reba, Director General
- Website: eca.et

The Ethiopian Communications Authority (Amharic: የኢትዮጵያ ኮምኒኬሽን ባለስልጣን, ECA) is the part of the Ethiopian government which regulates the telecommunications and postal sectors of Ethiopia. Its primary objective is to promote the development of high quality, efficient, reliable and affordable communications services in Ethiopia. It is also accountable to the Prime Minister; its current Director General is Engineer Balcha Reba since 2019.

== History ==
The introduction of telecommunication service in Ethiopia dated back during the reign of Emperor Menelik II in 1894. He introduced telephony while his cousin, Ras Mekonnen pioneered the first telephone after visiting Italy and returned to Ethiopia and established his company. In early 20th century, the company was under the control of the government and later brought to Ministry of Post and Communications. In 1952, the telecommunication service was separated from postal administration and was administered by the Ministry of Transport and Communications. At the time, the service went under Ethiopian Telecommunications Corporation (ETC).

Under the Derg regime, ETC was split into two entities: the Ethiopian Telecommunications Service (ETS) from October 1975 to February 1981 and the Ethiopian Telecommunications Authority (ETA) in January 1981. Both ETS as well as the ETA were responsible for telecommunication regulation and operation in Ethiopia. Under Council of Ministers regulation number 10/1996, ETA was replaced by ETC in which all of its rights has been transferred to ETC. There are 966 public service stations and exchanges across the country. By 2010, ETC has a target to reach telecom service to 15,000 rural kebeles. The number of telecom access has been increased in rural kebeles from only 60 in 2004/05 to 8 676 in 2007/08.

The number of cellular mobile broadband network access skyrocketed five times of 2004/5 by 2007/8, reaching 1,954,527. In 2005, ETC installed fiber optic backbone that spans 4,000 km in six radiating directions: from Addis Ababa, to Dire Dawa, Djibouti, Dessie-Mekelle, Bahir Dar-Nekemte, Jimma and Hawassa, delivering digital radio and television, internet and other multimedia services. In January 2005, ETC was transferred from narrowband to broadband with its first introduction of Internet, broadband VSAT and broadband multimedia infrastructure was viewed as major milestone over decade. The current Director General of ETC is Balcha Reba since September 2019.

== Core Mandate & Functions ==
The Ethiopian Telecommunication Agency (ETA), established by Proclamation No. 49/1996, was empowered with broad regulatory responsibilities to oversee and develop Ethiopia’s telecommunications sector. Some of its core functions include:

- Promotion of socio-economic development through access to telecom services.
- Licensing and supervision of telecom operators.
- Regulation of tariffs for basic telecom offerings.
- Approving telecom equipment for public use.
- Managing frequency spectrum allocated to Ethiopia.
- Representing Ethiopia in international telecom forums.
- Exercising legal and administrative authority, including contract execution and property ownership.etc

== See also ==
- Telecommunications in Ethiopia
- List of telecommunications regulatory bodies
- Botswana Communications Regulatory Authority
