= Humbo =

Coordinates: 6°40′N 37°50′E

Humbo Woreda: Humbbo Allaanaa (Wolaytta); ሁምቦ ወረዳ (Amharic)
- Woreda
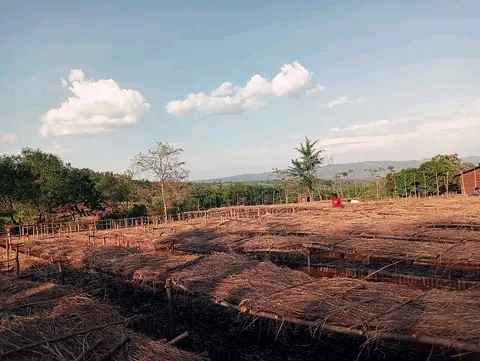
- Humbo district plantation area
- Interactive map of Humbo Woreda
- Country: Ethiopia
- Region: South Ethiopia
- Zone: Wolaita
- Seat: Tebela

Government
  - Chief administrator: Jagana Ayiza (Prosperity Party)

Population (2019)
  - Total: 161,792
  - Male: 81,151
  - Female: 80,641
- Time zone: UTC+3 (EAT)

Humbo is one of the woredas in the South Ethiopia Regional State of Ethiopia. It is a Part of the Wolayita Zone located in the Great Rift Valley, Humbo is bordered on the southeast by Abala Abaya, on the south by the Gamo Zone, on the west by Offa, on the north by Sodo Zuria and Bayra Koysha. The administrative center of Humbo is Tebela.

According to a 2004 report, Humbo had 25 kilometers of asphalt roads, 24 kilometers of all-weather roads and 51 kilometers of dry-weather roads, for an average road density of 118 kilometers per 1000 square kilometers.

== History ==
Humbo was selected by the Ministry of Agriculture and Rural Development in 2003 as an area for voluntary resettlement for farmers from overpopulated areas, becoming the new home for 658 heads of households. This included 618 heads of households selected from overpopulated parts of Humbo, Boloso Sore, Kindo Koysha, Sodo Zuria, Damot Weyde, and Damot Gale who were resettled at a new village at the southeastern part of the woreda near Lake Abaya, beginning in May.

Two kebeles in Humbo were flooded after the Bilate burst its banks between 24 and 30 April 2005. According to unconfirmed field reports the flood killed two people and displaced 6,755, of whom 965 were from resettlement sites. The flooding also damaged 1,017 hectares of crop land and killed numerous livestock. In August of the next year flooding in Humbo displaced 6,000 inhabitants but without causing either loss of life or damage to the crops.

The World Bank approved funding November 2007 for a project sponsored by World Vision Ethiopia to restore forest to 3,000 to 4,000 hectares in Humbo and 1,000 to 2,000 hectares in Soddo Zuria using native species, a program which would be funded with funds from carbon offset purchases.

== Demographics ==
Based on the 2019 population projection conducted by the CSA, this woreda has a total population of 161,792, of whom 81,151 are men and 80,641 women; 6,247 or 4.98% of its population are urban dwellers. The majority of the inhabitants were Protestants, with 87.15% of the population reporting that belief, 7.87% practiced Ethiopian Orthodox Christianity, and 4.07% were Catholic.

The 1994 national census reported a total population for this woreda of 96,642 of whom 48,339 were men and 48,303 were women; 2,764 or 2.86% of its population were urban dwellers. The three largest ethnic groups reported in Humbo were the Welayta (96.33%), the Amhara (1.28%), and the Sidama (0.86%); all other ethnic groups made up 1.53% of the population. Welayta is spoken as a first language by 96.8%, 1.5% Amharic, 0.88% speak Sidamo; the remaining 0.82% spoke all other primary languages reported.
