= Firew Altaye =

Ethiopian politician

Firew Altaye ፍሬው አልታዬ
- Alttaaye Firiya
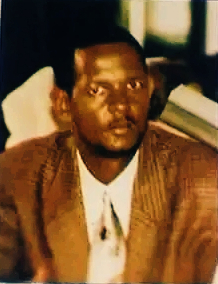
- Firew Altaye at Meeting

Member of Parliament
- In office 2000–2002

Chief Administrator of Wolayita Zone
- In office 2002–2004
- Preceded by: Mamo Godebo
- Succeeded by: Amanuel Otoro

Personal details
- Born: Firew Altaye Gebremedhin; 2 August 1966 Boloso Sore, Ethiopia
- Died: 17 March 2004 (aged 37) Wolaita Sodo, Ethiopia
- Cause of death: Natural death
- Education: Addis Ababa University University of Amsterdam

Firew Altaye Gebremedhin (Amharic: ፍሬው አልታዬ ገብረመድህን, Wolayttattuwa: Gebiremediina Alttaaye Firiya) was born on 2 August 1966. He was an Ethiopian politician and second chief administrator of Wolayita Zone, from 2002 to 2004 and he was succeeded by Amanuel Otoro. He served as member of Ethiopian parliament from 2001 to 2002.

== Early life ==
Firew Altaye was born in Boloso Sore in Wolaita, Ethiopia, and he completed his primary education in Hembecho Saint Michael Missionary School. He also completed his secondary education in Wolaita Sodo comprehensive high school. After completing his secondary education, he attended in Addis Ababa University and got first degree in 1990. He got MA degree from University of Amsterdam in international law and until his death he ruled Wolaita zone.

== Political career ==
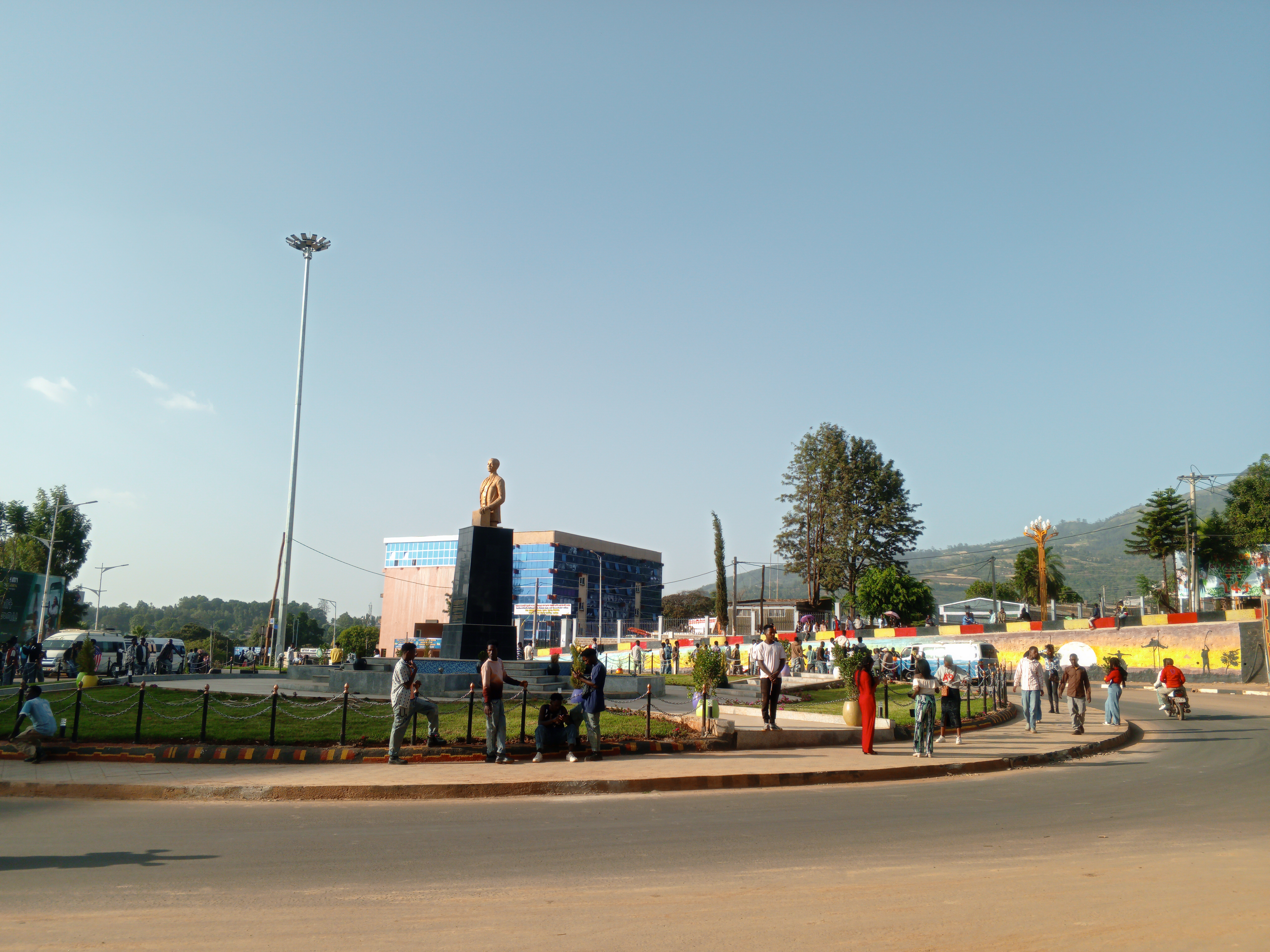
Firew Altaye monument

Firew Altaye was the chief administrator of Wolayita Zone for a short period of time and designer for the development of the nation. To this end, on February 21, 2011, the then Chief administrator, Dagato Kumbe, laid the foundation stone for a monument in his name in Wolaita Sodo. He fought against ethnic chauvinism which is so called Wogagoda. This event led to widespread protests by all social strata of the Wolaita population in 1998 that eventually resulted in Wolaytta having a zonal status and the recognition of its distinct language in November 2000. Firew and was a developmentalist who put the public interest before his own. Firew Altaye mobilized Wolayita people and built the Wolayita Gutara meeting and entertainment hall.

Firew served as officer of Wolayita Zone Justice Department, Chairman of Damot Weyde Woreda Teachers Association, Chairman of the North Omo Zone Teachers Association and as well vice-chairman of the Ethiopian Teachers Association. He also served as member of the EPRDF and SEPDM Central Committee, a diplomat at the FDRE Ministry of Foreign Affairs, and Wolayita Zone chief Administrator. The FDRE Minister of Culture and Sport, Shewit Shanka inaugurated his memorial monument in Wolaita Sodo on September 20, 2025.
