= Kindo (disambiguation) =

Kindo is an American rock band.

Kindo may also refer to:

- Michael Kindo (1947–2020), an Indian former field hockey player
- Kindo Didaye or Kindo Koysha, districts of Southern Nations, Nationalities, and Peoples' Region in Ethiopia
- Kindo Baha, a vihara in Nepal
