= Ajora Falls =

Waterfall in Ethiopia

- Ajjooraa Soossota (Wolaytta); አጆራ ፏፏቴዎች (Amharic)
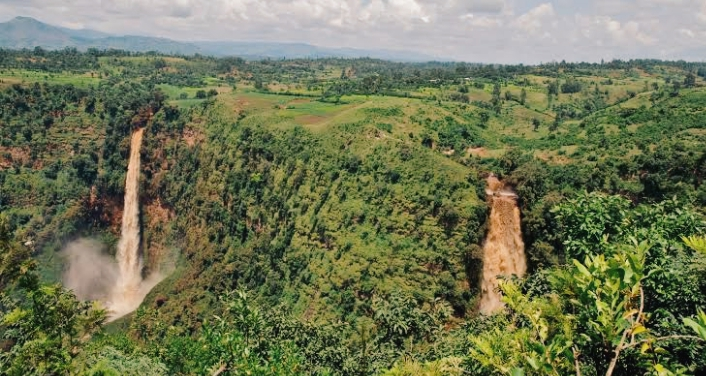
- Twin waterfalls

- Location within Ethiopia
- Location: Wolaita Zone
- Coordinates: 7°10′36″N 37°36′1″E
- Type: Twin waterfalls
- Number of drops: 2
- Longest drop: 210 metres (690 ft)

Ajora Falls are twin waterfalls in Southern Ethiopia. The falls specifically located in Boloso Bombe district of Wolaita Zone. The twin waterfalls, wildlife, various bird species, and dense forest make the area aesthetically attractive.

Ajora cliff is located between Sokei River, which flows from Tambaro, and Ajancho River in Wolaita. The rivers are about 1.65 km apart. The plain made after the waterfall goes up to the border of Dawro zone. This vast area is covered by dense forest and is home to various wild animals.

== Transportation and access ==
The falls may be reached by car, air plane, bicycle, etc. It is located 458 km (285 mi) from Addis Ababa via Shashemene, 300 km (190 mi) via Hosaenna-Soddo road, 238 km (148 mi) from the capital of the region, Hawassa, 68 km (42 mi) from the seat of Wolaita zone, Sodo and 20 km (12 mi) away from Bombe, the center of Boloso Bombe woreda.

== Name and description ==
In Wolaita language, "Ajora" means "deep". The place was named because of the twin waterfalls found in this area. It covers a geographical area of 280 hectares (690 acres). The first Ajora fall has 210 metres (690 ft) length and 2.5 m (8 ft) width and is named Ajancho. The second Ajora fall is 170 m (560 ft) in length and 1 m (3 ft) in width and named Sokei. The twin waterfalls join at a place called "Buqula", and flow to the Omo valley.
