= Gununo =

City in Wolaita, Ethiopia

Gununo: Gununo Ambbaa (Wolaytta); ጉኑኖ (Amharic)
- City
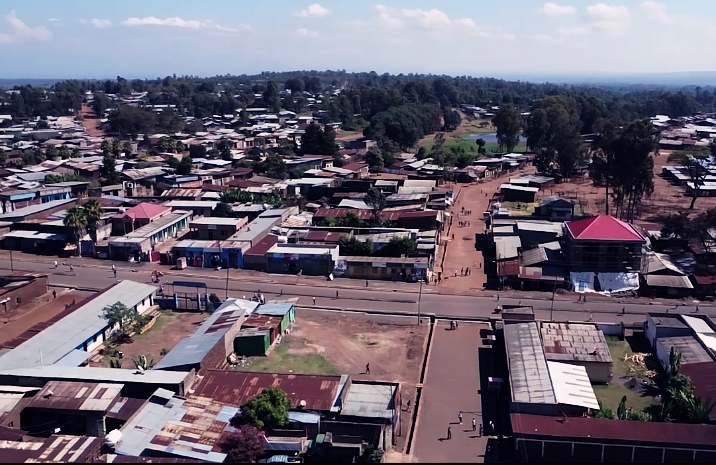
- Gununo View

- Gununo location within Wolayita Gununo Location within Ethiopia
- Coordinates: 6°55′21″N 37°41′10″E
- Country: Ethiopia
- Region: South Ethiopia Regional State
- Zone: Wolaita

Government
  - Mayor: BIRHANU WAJA WAREBO (Prosperity Party)

Population (2024)
  - Urban: 84,510
  - Male: 41,282
  - Female: 43,228
- Time zone: UTC+3 (EAT)

Gununo (Ge'ez: ጉኑኖ) is a city in Wolaita, Ethiopia. The city is administrative capital of Damot Sore district of Wolayita Zone. Gununo is located 345 km far from Addis Ababa which is the capital city of Ethiopia, and 17 km away from the capital of Wolaita Zone which is Sodo. The other districts situated near to Gununo are; on the South by Sodo Zuria, on the North West by Boloso Bombe, on the West by Kindo Koysha, and on the East by Boloso Sore. The coordinate point of Gununo city is 6°55'21"N 37°38'57"E.

== Demographics ==
Total population of the Gununo as conducted by central statistical agency of Ethiopia in 2020 is 15,700. From this 7,963 are men and 7,737 are women. The reproductive age group of women in the city are about 23.3% or 6,360 in number. There is only one health center and three private clinics in the city.
