= Gara Godo =

Town in Wolaita, Ethiopia

Gara Godo: Gaara Gooddo (Wolaytta); ጋራ ጎዶ (Amharic)
- Town
- Location within Ethiopia
- Coordinates: 7°08′01″N 37°46′16″E
- Country: Ethiopia
- Region: South Ethiopia Regional State
- Zone: Wolaita
- Woreda: Boloso Sore
- Time zone: UTC+3 (EAT)

Gara Godo (Ge'ez: ጋራ ጎዶ) is a town in Boloso Sore woreda, Wolayita Zone of Ethiopia. It is 28 km on an asphalted road from Areka to Wolaita Sodo the zone capital. Gara Godo lias on the 7°08'01N and 37°46'16E. The elevation of the town Gara Godo is 1812 meters above the sea level. The amenities in the town of Gara Godo are 24 hours electric light, pure water service, kindergarten, all time market, health stations and others. The town has also suitable weather condition, pure public water, banks, primary and secondary schools, telecommunications services and like.

== History ==
During derg regime Gara Godo is one of 43 Peasant Associations located in Bolosso Wereda of Wolayitta Awraja in Sidamo province. As Wolayttatto Doonaa Gara means wild pig and Godo means chasing. Long ago the residents hunted and killed wild pigs which troubled the area. Gara Godo is a mostly flat densely-settled highland place. The town officially established municipality at its center in 1990.
