= Damot =

Damot may refer to:

- Damot (historical region), a medieval province in western Ethiopia
- Dʿmt, ancient kingdom in Eritrea and Ethiopia, the Horn of Africa
- Kingdom of Damot, a medieval kingdom in what is now Eritrea and north of Ethiopia
- Damot Sore, woreda in southern Ethiopia
- Damot Pulasa, woreda in southern Ethiopia
- Damot Weyde, woreda in southern Ethiopia
- Damot Gale, woreda in southern Ethiopia
- Docmo (town), a town the Somali region in Ethiopia also translated as Damot
- Danot (also Damot), woreda in eastern Ethiopia
