= Bogale Walelu Secondary and Preparatory School =

Bogale Walelu Secondary and Preparatory School: Walelu Buggaala 2^{ntto} xekkkaa luxetta keettaa (Wolaytta)
- Wolayita; SERS; Wolaita Sodo

Information
- Language: English

Bogale Walelu Secondary and Preparatory School is school in Ethiopia. The school is located in Southern Nations, Nationalities, and Peoples' Region, Wolaita Zone, Sodo City Administration. It is found 310 km away from Addis Ababa in the Southern direction via B51. The school is one of the prominent school situated in the wolaita sodo town. The school gets its name because of the known writer of wolaita history called Bogale Walelu. As study done in 2018 by Wolaita Sodo University, Bogale Walelu secondary school has significantly higher mean score of teacher-related challenges than Sholla Kodo secondary school Areka secondary school and Gununo secondary school. Whereas, a statistically significant difference was not found between other schools.
