= Gebremeskel =

Gebremeskel is an Ethiopian masculine given name and surname. Notable people with the name include:

== Given name ==
- Gebremeskel Chala (born 1984), Ethiopian politician
- Yohannes Gebremeskel Tesfamariam, Ethiopian lieutenant general

== Surname ==
- Dejen Gebremeskel (born 1989), Ethiopian long-distance runner
