= Asrat Tera =

Ethiopian politician

- Xeera Asirata
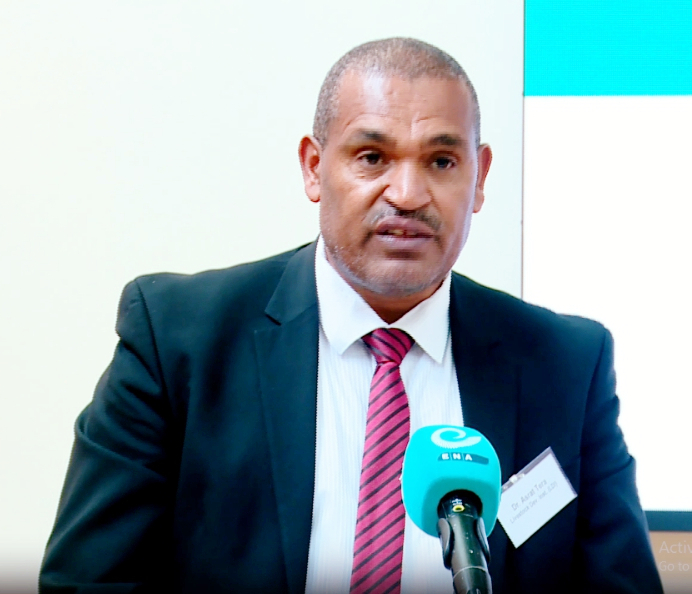

Wolayita Zone Administration

Chief Administrator
- In office 2016 – August 2018
- Preceded by: Eyob Wate
- Succeeded by: Getahun Garedew

Ethiopian Livestock Development Institute

Director General
- Incumbent
- Assumed office October 2018
- Appointed by: Abiy Ahmed

Personal details
- Education: Hawassa University

Asrat Tera Dolebo (Amharic: አስራት ጤራ ዶሌቦ (ዶ/ር)) is an Ethiopian politician serving as Director General of Livestock Development Institute of Ethiopia since October 2018. Asrat is from the Wolaita people and previously served as the chief administrator of Wolayita Zone. He also worked in South Agricultural Research Institute and Areka Agricultural Research Center.

== Career ==
Asrat Tera has worked at Southern Ethiopia Peoples' Regional State's Agricultural Research Institute (SARI) and Areka Agricultural Research Center in Areka. Asrat currently works at the Director General of Livestock Development Institute which was formerly called National Animal Genetic Improvement Institute (NAGII). Asrat has also served as the chief administrator of Wolayita Zone for two years since 2016.
