= Getahun Garedew =

Ethiopian politician

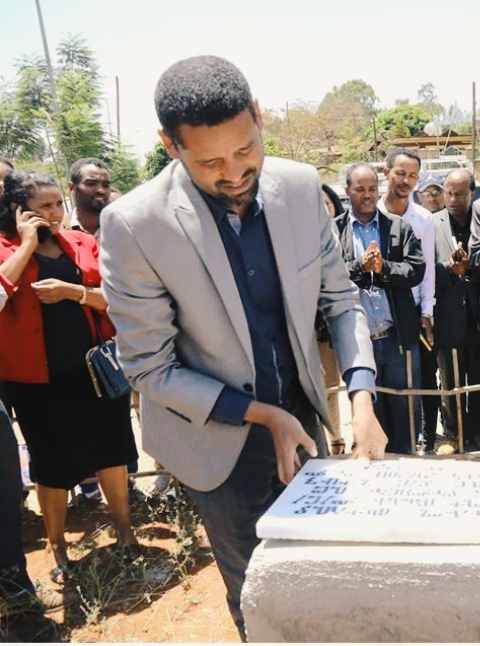

Wolaita Sodo University Natural Resources Management

Academic Dean
- In office 2009–2016

Wolayita Zone Administration Office

Chief Administrator
- In office July 2018 – November 2018
- Preceded by: Asrat Tera
- Succeeded by: Dagato Kumbe

SNNPR Education Bureau

Bureau Head
- In office November 2018 – June 2022

Ministry of Education

State Minister
- In office June 2022 – November 2022

Ethiopian Environmental Protection Authority

Director General
- Incumbent
- Assumed office December 2022

Personal details
- Education: University of South Africa; Addis Ababa University

Getahun Garedew Wodaje is Ethiopian politician serving as Director general of FDRE environmental protection authority. Getahun is from Wolaita people and he served as Wolayita Zone chief administrator in 2018.

== Career ==
From 2009 to 2016 Getahun served in different capacities at Wolaita Sodo University, including as assistant professor, Academic Dean, Academic Programs Officer and Department Head for Natural Resources Management. Later July 2018 to November of the same year he worked as chief administrator of Wolayita Zone. Getahun served as the State Minister of the Ministry of Education from June 2022 to November 2022. With the Rank of the vice-president, he had also led the Regional Education Bureau of the Southern Nations, Nationalities, and Peoples' Region for four years starting from 2018. Now, Getahun Garedew is working as Director General of Environmental Protection Authority of Ethiopia since 2022.
