= Mochena Borago =

Rockshelter and archaeological site in Ethiopia

Mochena Borago ሞቸና ቦራጎ
- Location within Ethiopia
- Location: Wolaita Zone
- Coordinates: 6°54′12.9″N 37°46′45.8″E
- Elevation: 2908 m
- Entrances: 2
- Features: Rockshelter

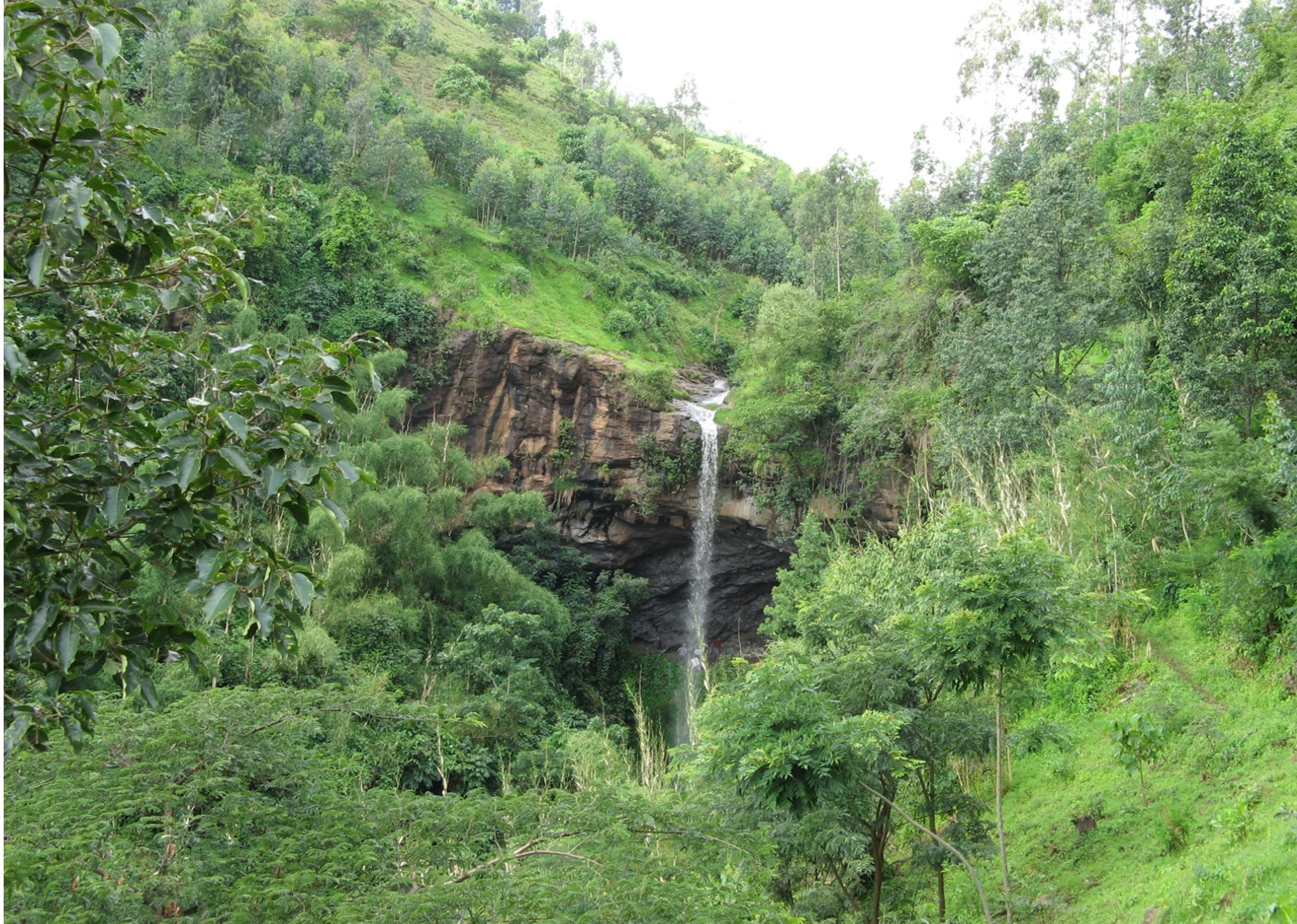
Opening and surroundings of Mochena Borago

Mochena Borago is a rockshelter and archaeological site situated on the western slope of Mount Damota, nearest to the town of Wolaita Sodo in Ethiopia, located in the Southern Nations, Nationalities and Peoples Region. The site is well-dated, with 59 radiocarbon dates, which gives it one of the most secure chronologies among Late Pleistocene sites in the Horn of Africa and Eastern Africa. It is one of only a few African sites found with intact deposits dating to Marine Isotope Stage (MIS) 3 outside of South Africa, and was potentially a refugium for hunter-gatherering peoples during the cold and arid period of MIS 4. This makes it an important research site for testing the "refugium theory," which states that over the past 70,000 years, during cold, arid conditions, like those of the Last Glacial Maximum and MIS 4, humans sought refuge in the mountains of the southwest Ethiopian Highlands, which received higher rainfall, making them more habitable than the surrounding areas. Research at Mochena Borago is helping to reconstruct human behavior during the Late Pleistocene, and the paleoenvironment that Homo sapiens would have inhabited at this time in the Horn of Africa.

== Ecology ==
Mount Damota, which is a trachytic volcano, is currently dormant, and rises 2908 meters above sea level at its summit. It was last active from around 2.94 million years ago to the Late Quaternary. The volcano's coordinates are 6°54′12.9″N 37°46′45.8″E. Damota touches the administrative capital of the Wolaita Zone, Sodo, at its southern foot, and it lies between the Southwest Ethiopian Highlands and the Ethiopian Rift Valley from west to east, and between the central Rift Valley lakes and Bilate River from north to south. The rockshelter itself is about 70 m wide, 12 m high, and around 20 m from the east wall to the waterfall located at the mouth of the site to the west. It has an area of around 600m², and is located at 2300m asl. The waterfall comes from a ravine that runs down Mount Damota and over Mochena Borago. This ravine serves as a year-round source of freshwater for the locals of Mount Damota, and comes from streams of precipitation that fall from the top of the mountain chain. The rainy season on Damota runs from June to September, during which half of annual rainfall, 2000 mm, falls.

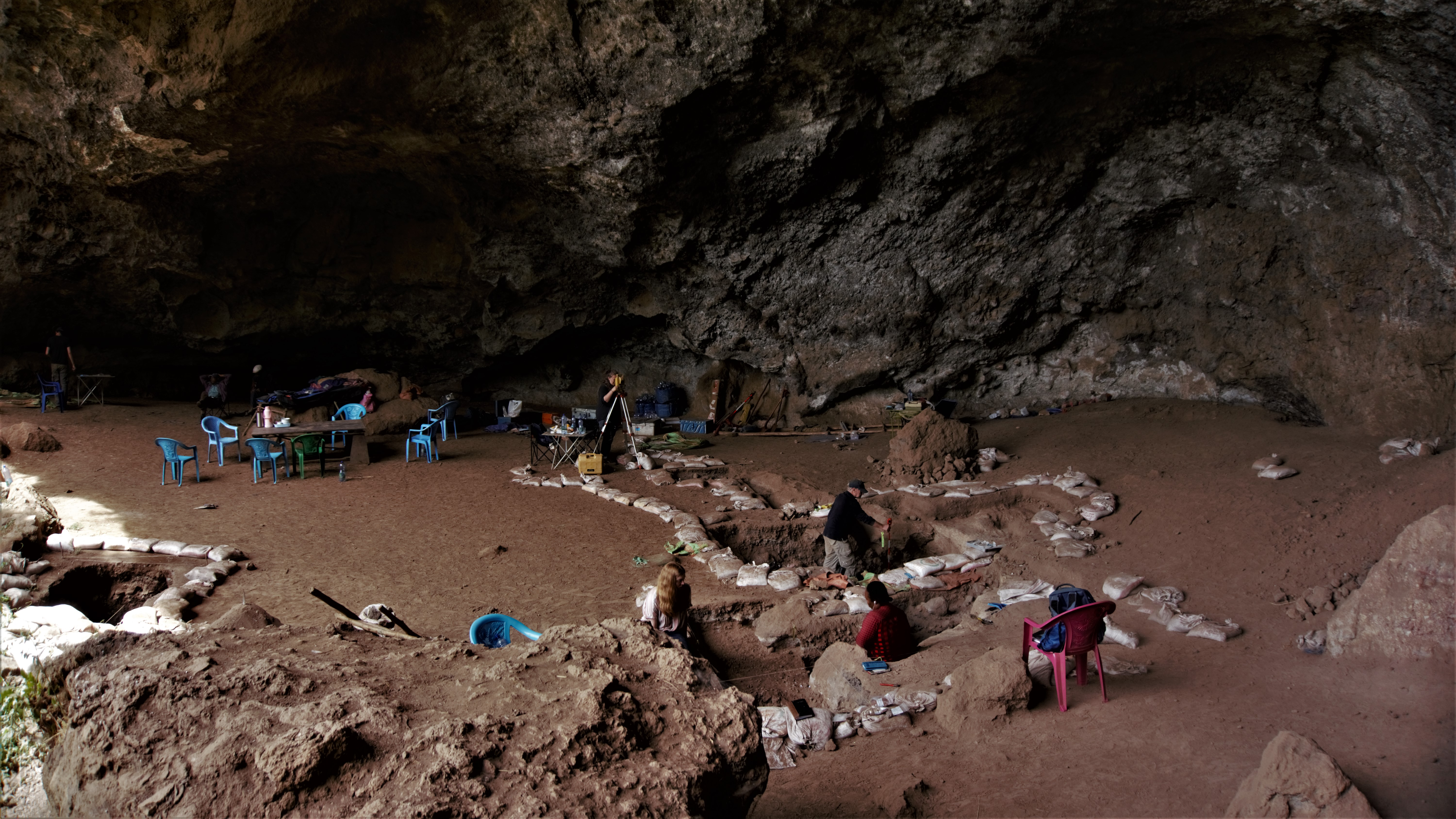
Excavations being carried out at Mochena Borago

The high biodiversity as well as prevalence of plant and animal resources, both wild and domesticated, in the area surrounding Mount Damota is consistent environmentally with other regions in the southwest Ethiopian Highlands. On and around Mount Damota there exists a series of vertical ecozones caused by the variations of physiographic features and altitude, wherein vegetation differs. There are three important agro-ecological zones that can be found in the Mount Damota area, as identified by local farmers. Mochena Borago is located within the zone known as 'woyna dega.' The walls of the rockshelter are made of volcaniclastic flow and volcanic ash. Boulders that have fallen from the roof of the shelter lie on the floor and beneath its surface.

== The Refugium Theory ==
About 125-100 ka during Marine Isotope Stage (MIS) 5, when conditions were warm and humid, the first dispersals of Homo sapiens out of Africa and into Asia took place. These dispersals were halted when the colder and more arid MIS 4 occurred. With the more favorable conditions of the early MIS 3 (~57-29 ka), humans spread throughout Africa and to almost every continent, which we know from both genetic and archaeological evidence. The Refugium Theory states that, under the harsher conditions of MIS 4 within Africa, populations of humans would have seen a decrease, and would have been forced into environmental refugia. It has been proposed that in the Mid-Pleistocene these refugia were where many African innovations took place, equipping Homo sapiens with the behavioral tools needed to survive during MIS 4, and subsequently to populate the globe by the end of the Pleistocene, once MIS 3 brought better conditions for this migration.

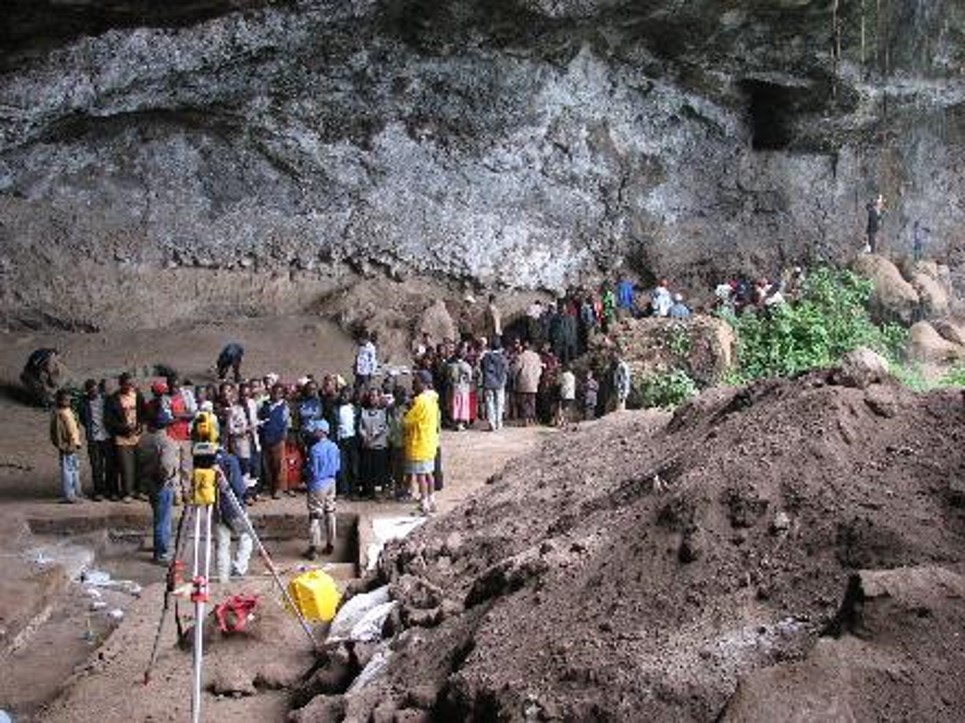
Students from Wolaita Sodo University visiting Mochena Borago

Mochena Borago is an important site for testing this hypothesis, as it is one of a few sites outside of South Africa with securely dated MIS 3 deposits. The other sites include Mumba Cave in Tanzania, and Haua Fteah Cave in Libya. Further excavation and dating at Mochena Borago could possibly show the presence of MIS 4 deposits as well. As a potential refugium, archaeological excavations at Mochena Borago may be able to provide vital links between human innovations in technology, organization, mobility, etc. and climatic events around the time of the second major dispersal of Homo sapiens into the rest of Africa and the world.

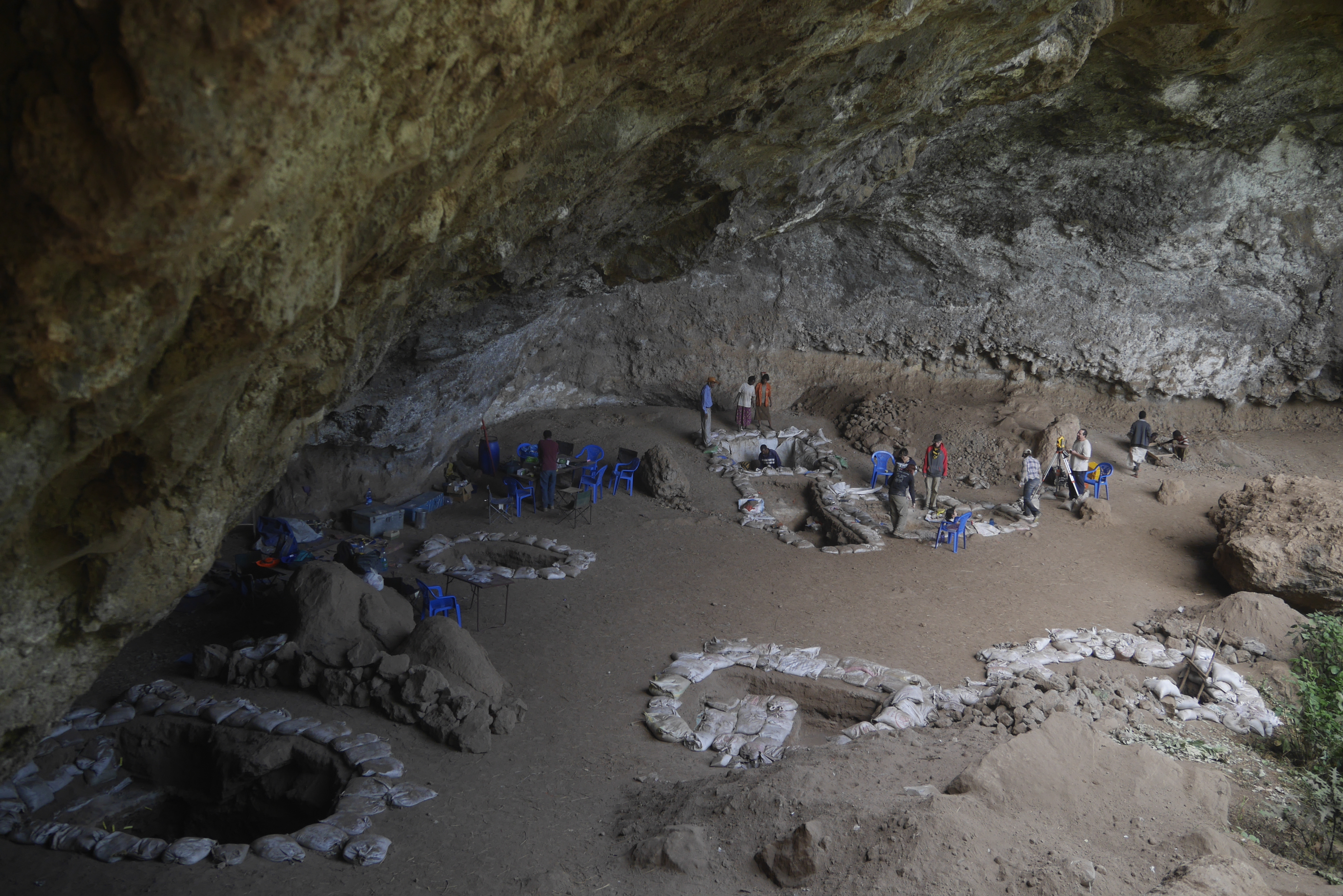
Excavation areas within Mochena Borago Rockshelter

== Archaeology ==
Archaeology at Mochena Borago began in 1995 with survey work done under the direction of French archaeologist Roger Joussaume with the Groupe pour l'Etude de la Protohistoire de la Corne de l'Afrique (GEPCA), a group most interested in the Mid- to Late Holocene deposits at the site. Excavations were first carried out by GEPCA from 1998 to 2001 in the Holocene layers and some of the Late Pleistocene deposits under new director, Xavier Gutherz from the University of Montpellier in France. Xavier Gutherz directed a project at the site from 2000 to 2002 that focused on recovering evidence of food production during the Holocene occupations. The about 20m² that Gutherz excavated along the northern section of the rockshelter have come to be called the "Block Excavation Area" or (BXA). Gutherz also opened the excavation areas known as MB1, MB2, MB3, and MB4.

Direction of the site was transferred in 2006 to Dr. Steven Brandt and Dr. Elisabeth Hildebrand, who started the Southwest Ethiopia Archaeological Project (SWEAP), beginning the focus on the Pleistocene deposits of Mochena Borago. They opened the excavation area MB5, located in the eastern part of the site, and deepened MB1. Later, areas MB1 and MB3 were deepened, and MB5 and MB6 were expanded by SWEAP and co-director at the time, Ralf Vogelsang. The project initially intended to investigate Mochena Borago for evidence of MIS 2 habitation, specifically during the last glacial maximum. However, 19 charcoal dates from the site showed the archaeologists that the rockshelter may not yield information about refugia in the southwest Ethiopian highlands during MIS 2, but that it could be very important for studying MIS 3 or possibly MIS 4 refugia in the region instead. SWEAP partnered with the Collaborative Research Center 806 (CRC 806) at the University of Cologne to conduct joint research at the rockshelter on human behavioral change corresponding to dispersals out of Africa, beginning in 2009 and excavating each season from 2010 to 2014. Since 2015, SWEAP has continued excavations at Mochena Borago, with other focuses on site formation processes and micromorphological sampling.

== Important finds ==
=== Holocene ===
Artifacts found at Mochena Borago span a timeframe of 53,000 BP to 1,480 BP. Gutherz identified pottery, hearths, bone, both burnt and unburnt, and lithics, which he classified as "MSA and LSA" within three excavation areas. GEPCA also analyzed geological samples taken from the walls and floor of Mochena Borago that identified volcanic deposits at the site. Evidence of hunter-gatherers preceding ceramics traditions in the region has been found and dated from the Later Stone Age levels at Mochena Borago Rockshelter. From 2,200 BP on, ceramics begin to appear among Mode 5 lithics in the Mid- to Late Holocene archaeological deposits at the site. These ceramics constitute one of the only instances of early pottery found in the east of the Southwest Ethiopian Highlands. Multiple phases of occupation have been identified for the rockshelter by looking at the stratigraphy of the sedimentation throughout time in the excavation units. Most of the occupations have been linked to periods of increased humidity in the area. Mochena Borago gets its name from a prominent historical figure in the Wolaita region, an advisor to the last king, Tona: Moche Borago. The first researchers at the site had written its name as "Moche Borago," but local people and official records say that the name is actually "Mochena Borago."

=== Pleistocene ===
The Late Pleistocene deposits at Mochena Borago date from >49 ka to ~36 ka. The lithic assemblages from the site at this time are rather consistent, composed mainly of flaked obsidian artifacts, which make up around 96% in total. The dominance of obsidian in the assemblage makes sense, as Mochena Borago is rather close to a large obsidian outcrop located about 20 km to the southeast where the raw material is very abundant. X-ray Fluorescence analyses performed on obsidian lithics from Mochena Borago show that >90% were made from raw materials sourced from this location. These obsidian artifacts are small, despite the high availability of the resource.

The typology of stone artifacts in the assemblages from Mochena Borago have largely remained the same over time, even during major climatic changes in the region, such as those of MIS 3. Cores created from reduction strategies such as Levallois and radial core reduction have been persistent at the site, as have other core types, which consist of a variety of flake cores and blade cores. Facially retouched tools are more prominent in the older deposits, while backed pieces are dominant in the later deposits, although both are present throughout the assemblages. Backed pieces found in deposits >50 ka suggest the practice of hafting by MIS 3 hunter-gatherers in the southwest Ethiopian Highlands during the beginning of their expansion.
