= Mount Damota =

Highest peak in Wolaita, Ethiopia

- ዳሞት ተራራ
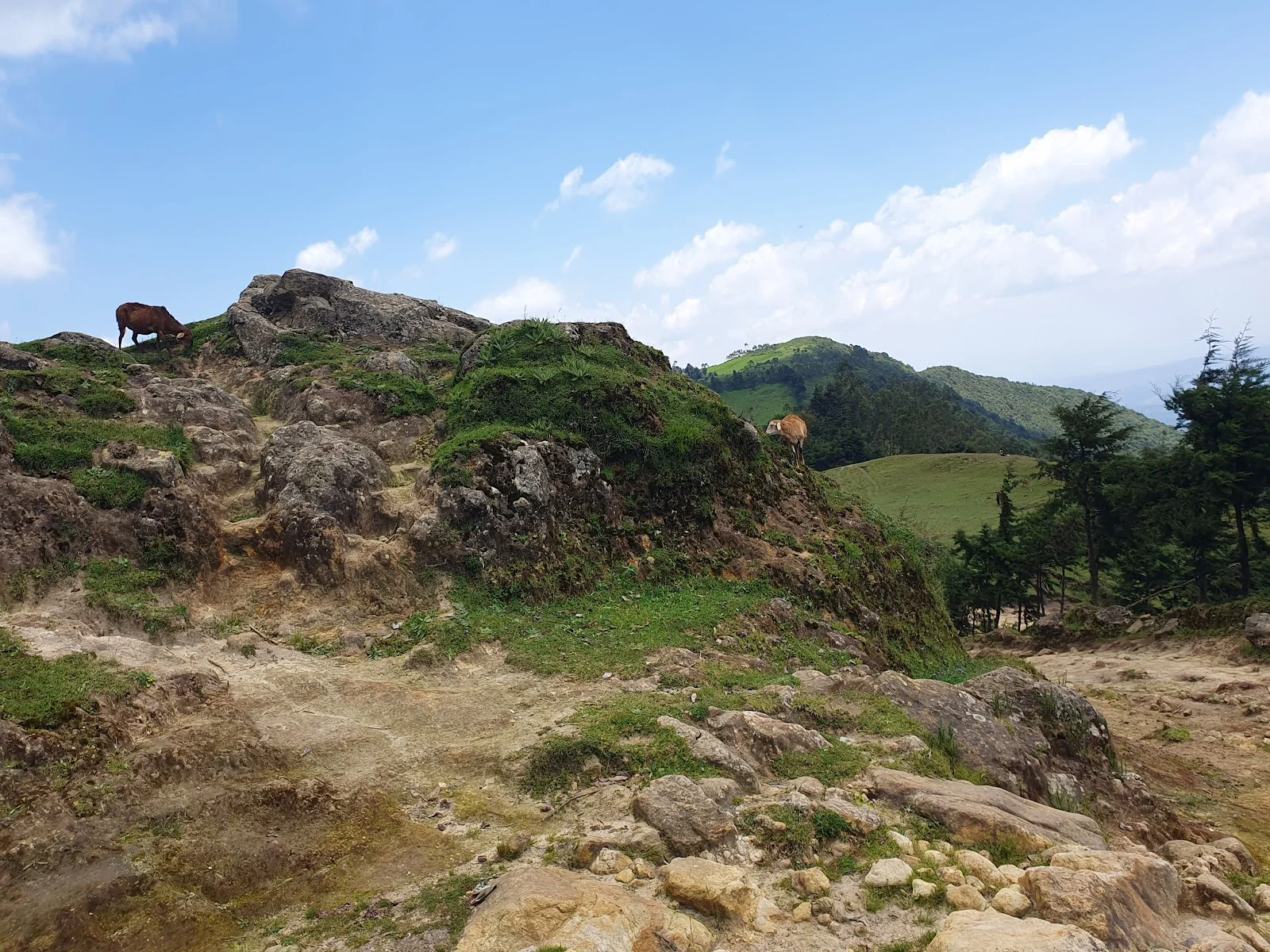

Highest point
- Elevation: 2,750 m (9,020 ft)
- Coordinates: 6°54′12.9″N 37°46′45.8″E

Naming
- Native name: Daamoota Deriya (Wolaytta)

Geography
- Location within Ethiopia
- Country: Ethiopia
- Zone: Wolayita
- City: Sodo

Mount Damota or Mount Damot is the highest peak in Wolayita, South Ethiopia Regional State, Ethiopia with altitude of nearly 2,750 meters (9,020 ft) above the sea level. Mt. Damota area is found in Wolaita Zone between Damot Gale, Boloso Sore, and Soddo Zuria districts. Mt. Damota is a source of many streams flowing to different districts in radial pattern namely: Hamessa, Waja (river), Bisare, Gazina and other rivers. Mount Damota is the source of many springs and small rivers that play a significant role in the enrichment of groundwater and surface water. In addition, the clean drinking water that is used in northern part of the Wolaita Sodo city comes from this mountain.

The Damot Mountain has a historical value to the Welayta Communities. It was used as a place of coronation and burial by Wolayita kings.
