= Petros Woldemariam =

Ethiopian politician

- Wolddemaariyama Phexiroosa (Wolaytta)

Areka city administration office

Mayor
- In office 2022–2024

Wolayita Zone Administration Office

Chief Administrator
- In office 31 August 2024 – 08 July 2025
- Preceded by: Samuel Fola
- Succeeded by: Samuel Tessema (AP)

South Ethiopia Regional State coffee and tea authority

Director
- Incumbent
- Assumed office 2025

Petros Woldemariam Albe is an Ethiopian politician serving as director general of South Ethiopia Regional State Coffee and tea authority. He was chief administrator of Wolayita Zone from 31 August 2024 to 8 July 2025 Petros is from the Wolaitans and previously served as mayor of Areka city administration.

Before becoming politician, Petros participated in research works in the areas of irrigation. The notable research is titled 'Determinants of Small-Scale Irrigation Use: The Case of Boloso Sore District, Wolayita Zone' which is published in 2017. He also worked as part of a delegation with foreign partners under a program called South East Technological University, working on development and resilience projects that include education and infrastructure.
