= Wolayita Zone =

Zone in the South Ethiopia Regional State

Coordinates: 6°50′N 37°45′E

Wolayita Zone: Wolaytta Moottaa (Wolaytta)
- Zone
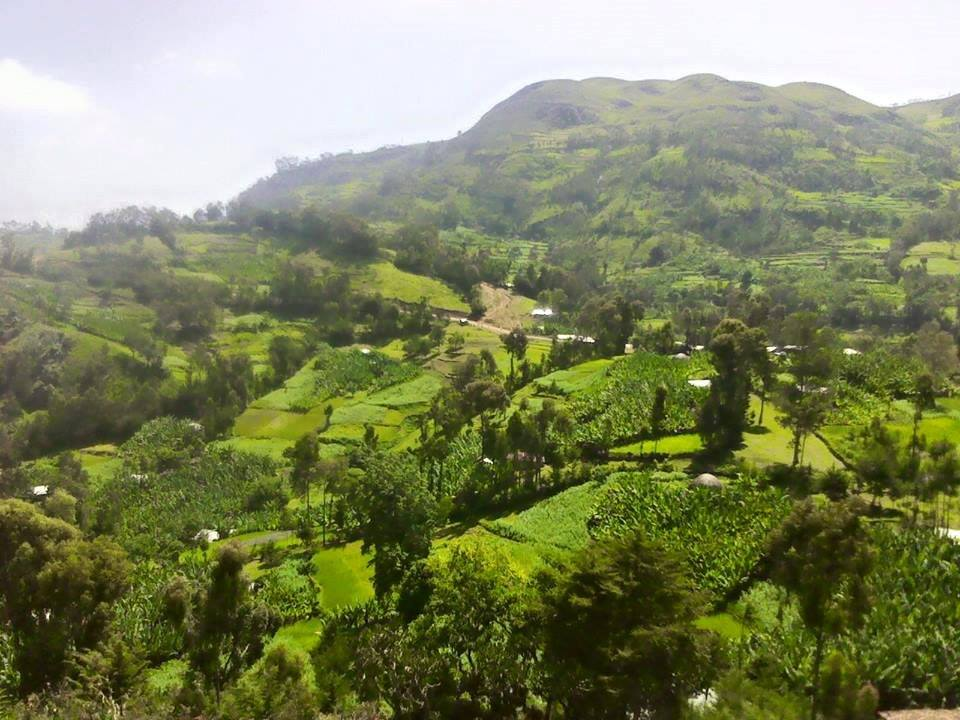
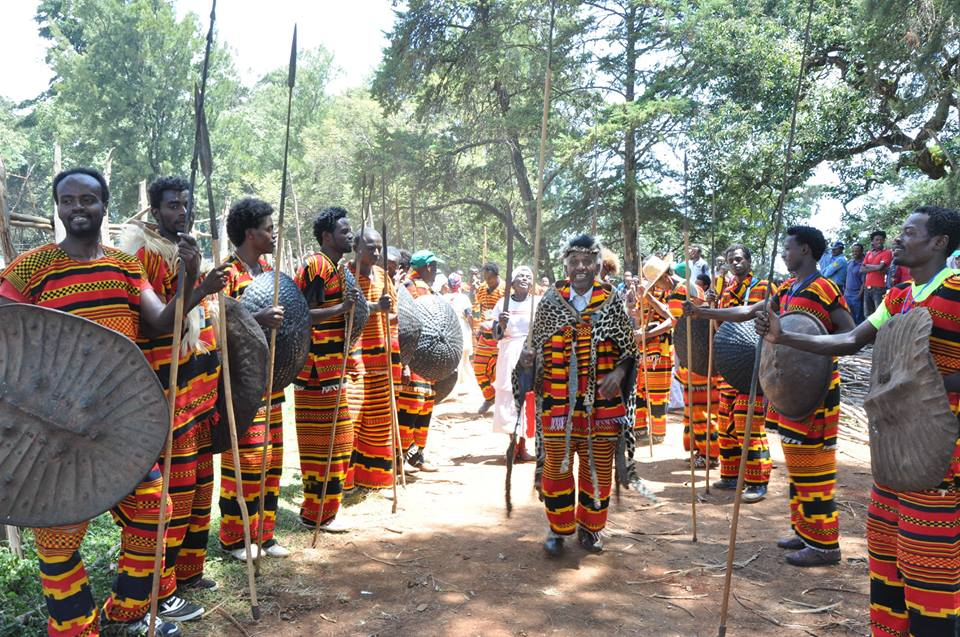
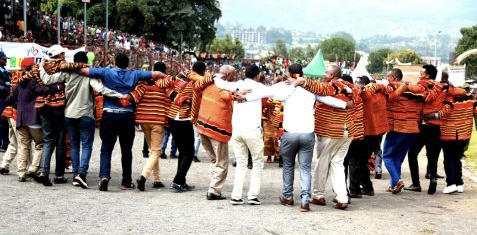
- From left: Mount Damota, Wolayita war dance, Leke playing Men
- Nickname: The Land of More Than 50 Kings
- Map of Wolaita

- Wolaita Zone location in Ethiopia
- Country: Ethiopia
- Region: South Ethiopia Regional State
- Kingdom of Damot: 1100
- Kingdom of Wolaita: 1251
- Incorporated to Ethiopian Empire: 1894
- Separated from North Omo Zone: 2000
- Founder: Wolaitans
- Capital: Wolaita Sodo

Government
  - Chief administrator: Samuel Tessema (AP) (Prosperity Party)
  - Deputy: Tesfahun Tadewos

Area
  - Zone: 4,511.7 km^{2} (1,742.0 sq mi)
  - Cultivated: 261,000 ha (640,000 acres)
  - Grazing land: 5,318 ha (13,140 acres)
- Highest elevation (Mount Damota): 2,750 m (9,020 ft)
- Lowest elevation: 1,500 m (4,900 ft)

Population (2025)
  - Zone: 2,342,735
  - Density: 520.8/km^{2} (1,349/sq mi)
  - Urban -as of 2025: 530,818
  - Urban density: 385/km^{2} (1,000/sq mi)
  - Rural: 1,811,917
  - Male: 1,150,011
  - Female: 1,192,724
- Demonym: Wolaitans (96.31%)
- Time zone: UTC+3 (EAT)
- Website: www.snnprswolaitazone.gov.et

Map of the regions and zones of Ethiopia

Wolayita or Wolaita is an administrative zone in Ethiopia. Wolayita is bordered on the south by Gamo Zone, on the west by the Omo River which separates it from Dawro, on the northwest by Kembata Zone and Tembaro Special Woreda, on the north by Hadiya, on the northeast by the Oromia Region, on the east by the Bilate River which separates it from Sidama Region, and on the south east by the Lake Abaya which separates it from Oromia Region. The administrative centre of Wolayita is Wolaita Sodo. Other major towns are Areka, Boditi, Tebela, Bale Hawassa, Gesuba, Gununo, Bedessa and Dimtu.

Wolayita has 358 kilometres (222 mi) of all-weather roads and 425 kilometres (264 mi) of dry-weather roads, for an average road density of 187 kilometres per 1000 square kilometres. Its highest point is Mount Damota (2738 meters).

== History ==
=== Before 1894 ===
The people of Wolayta are known for their more than 50 kings within four dynasties. The kings of Wolaita got the title Kawo. The Wolayta nationality are a proud people who had a distinct, continuous, strong and independent kingdoms going back to the 13th Century and beyond to the first Millennium until 1894. The war of resistance led by the last Kawo (King) of Wolaita, Tona Gaga, was one of the bloodiest campaigns in Menelik's whole period of expansion, which resulted in the incorporation of the Wolaita Kingdom, along with other nationalities and peoples in the South, into the Ethiopian Empire. The Wolaita's military resistance, and repulsion of Menelik’s generals (which were armed with modern firearms), showed the strength of Wolaita's military organization and people. The Wolaita’s resistance was finally crushed, with it conquered by Ethiopia, in 1894 after the bloodiest battle led by Emperor Menelik II himself.

=== From 1894 ===
Despite the centuries-old oppression, the Wolayta people have a distinct national identity, that is, the people have a language, culture, traditions, history, a psychological make-up, and a contiguous geography that define them and make them distinct from other nationalities and people in Ethiopia. The Wolayta people’s resistance and struggle against the monarchical regime for economic and political emancipation, and the anti-democratic denial of the Wolayta peoples self-governance afterwards epitomizes their enduring and uninterrupted struggle for self-determination.

=== Quest for statehood ===
During the 1991-94 Transitional Government period, the Wolayta had its own Region which was Kilil 9 but it was merged into the Southern Nations, Nationalities, and Peoples' Region (SNNPR) when the federation was constituted in 1995. Since, there has been public discontent and opposition members requesting autonomy were beaten, tortured, and a significant number of youths exiled.

In 1997, SEPDM tried to create WOGAGODA, merging the neighboring ethnicities with Wolayta, which ultimately would have diluted the century-old culture and emblem of the Wolayta people. That attempt saw a fierce struggle from the people and the government’s homogenizing move was finally abandoned. However, thousands were detained and hundreds were killed, and hundreds of thousands of ethnic Wolaita were forcefully displaced from Arba Minch, the then capital of North Omo Zone, which dissolved after Wolaita, Gamo Gofa and Dawro split and formed their own zonal administration between 1998 and 2000. Security forces killed at least five when the Wolayta successfully campaigned for their own zone and rejected the attempted imposition of a new composite language.

Until 2000 Wolayita was part of the North Omo Zone, and the 1994 national census counted its inhabitants as part of that zone. However friction between the various ethnic groups in North Omo, which was often blamed on the Wolayta for "ethnic chauvinism" and despite the efforts of the ruling party to emphasize the need to co-ordinate, consolidate, and unify the smaller ethnic units to achieve the "efficient use of scarce government resources", eventually led to the division of the zone in 2000, resulting in the creation of not only the Wolayita, but also the Gamo Gofa and Dawro Zones, and two special woredas.

The constitutional rights of the Wolayta people for statehood has gathered momentum in the recent years, where following widespread consultation held at all levels the proposal to establish a Wolaita Regional State was approved. During the administration of Dagato Kumbe, the Zonal Council unanimously voted to demand statehood, and consistent with the letter and spirit of the Constitution sent a formal letter on 19 December 2018 to the SNNPR Government requesting a referendum.

In August 2020 38 members of SNNPR Council who represent the Wolaita zone withdrew themselves from the region's council in protests against move to reorganize the region into four states. Wolaita zone representatives say the move didn't consider their request for separate statehood.

In May and December 2019 rallies were held in Wolaita supporting the separation of the zone from the SNNPR to become a region in its own right. A rally on 20 December 2019, oppose the failure of the regional council to send a request of the zone to become a regional state to the National Board of Election to arrange a referendum.

=== 2023 referendum ===
In 2018 Wolayita have submitted a request to the SNNPR council to form their own new state. However, following the formation of Sidama regional state in June 2020, the request was not immediately dealt with. Instead the then ruling party SEPDM wanted to establish cluster regions by uniting two or more zones and special woredas. Originally, Wolayta zonal council insisted on a separate referendum and threatened a unilateral declaration of statehood. This led to a crackdown by federal security forces against the Wolayta zone leaders and activists that resulted in the arrest of several people.

On 1 August 2022 after several months passed, the Wolayita zonal council gave in by reversing its decision and agreed to join the other zones and special woredas to form one state. As result, in February, referendum was held in Wolayta and other five zones and five special woredas in the Southern Nations, Nationalities and Peoples Regional State on statehood to determine whether Wolayta, Gamo, Gofa, South Omo, Gedeo and Konso zones and Dirashe, Amaro, Burji, Basketo and Ale special woredas will form a separate autonomous state or remain within the SNNPR.

On 20 February, the National Election Board of Ethiopia released the results of the referendum. However the official results from the Wolayita Zone were not announced at that time. According to the Board, a variety of irregularities occurred before and during the vote, largely due to strong efforts by Wolayita to establish its own regional state. As a result, the referendum in the Wolayita Zone was rerun on 19 June 2023. This second referendum differed from others held in Ethiopia, as both voter registration and voting took place on the same day. Eight days later, the results were released, officially incorporating the Wolayita Zone into the South Ethiopia Regional State.

== Geography ==
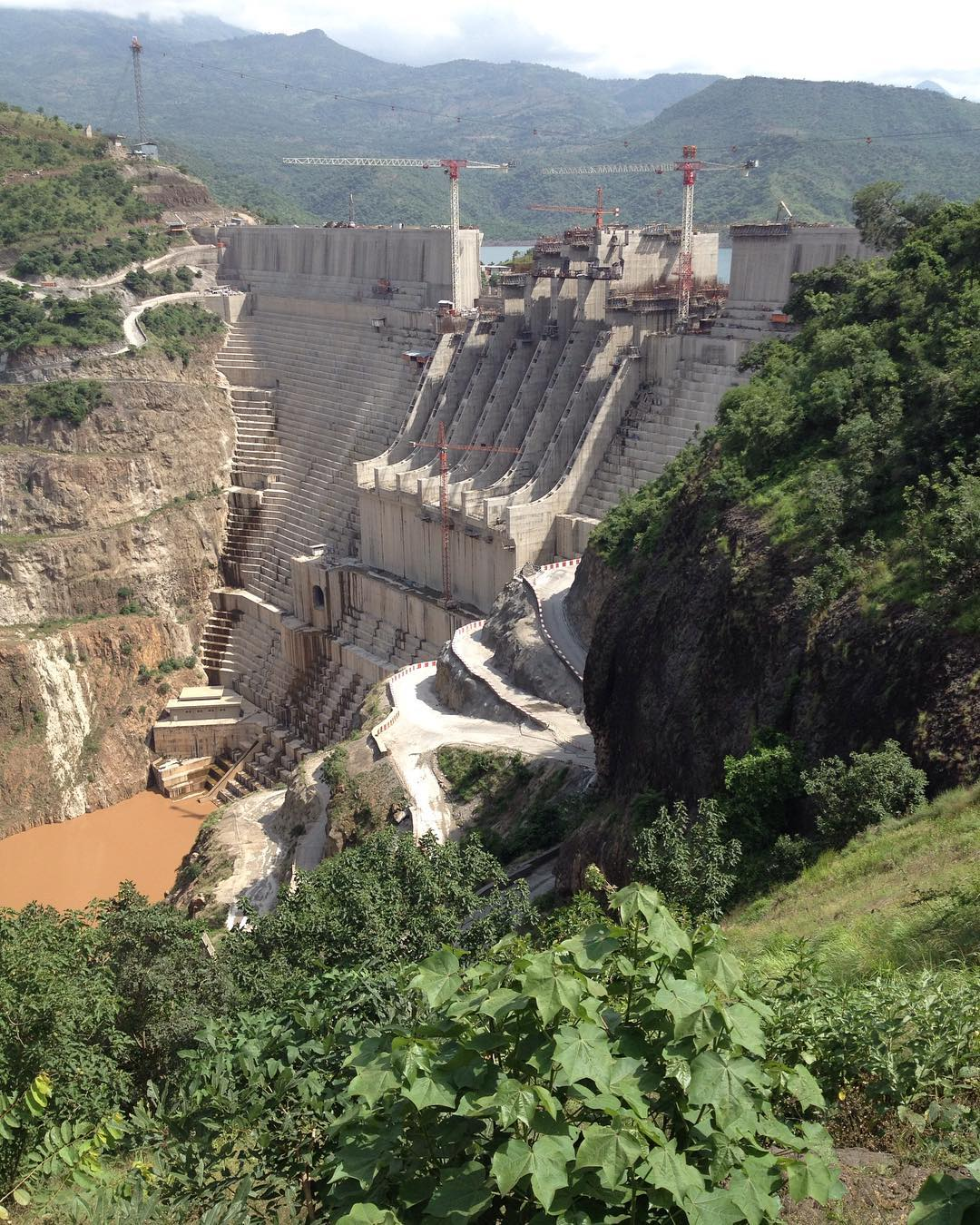
Omo river, Gibe III Dam in Wolayita

Wolayta is one of the 16 Zonal Administrations of the Southern Region In Ethiopia, located about 300 kilometers (190 mi) south of Addis Ababa. Wolayta is bordered to the northwest by Tambaro, to the east by the Bilate river—which separates it from the Arsi-Oromo area—to the south by Lake Abaya and Kucha, and to the west by the Omo River. The Gilgel Gibe III Dam, a major hydroelectric power plant built on the Omo River, boasts a capacity of 1,870 megawatts, making it the third-largest hydroelectric facility in Africa

The vegetation and climate across much of the region are shaped by its elevation, which generally ranges between 1,500 and 1,800 meters (4,900 to 5,900 feet) above sea level. However, five mountains in the area rise above 2,000 meters (6,600 feet), with Mount Damota—towering at 3,000 meters (9,800 feet)—standing prominently at the center.

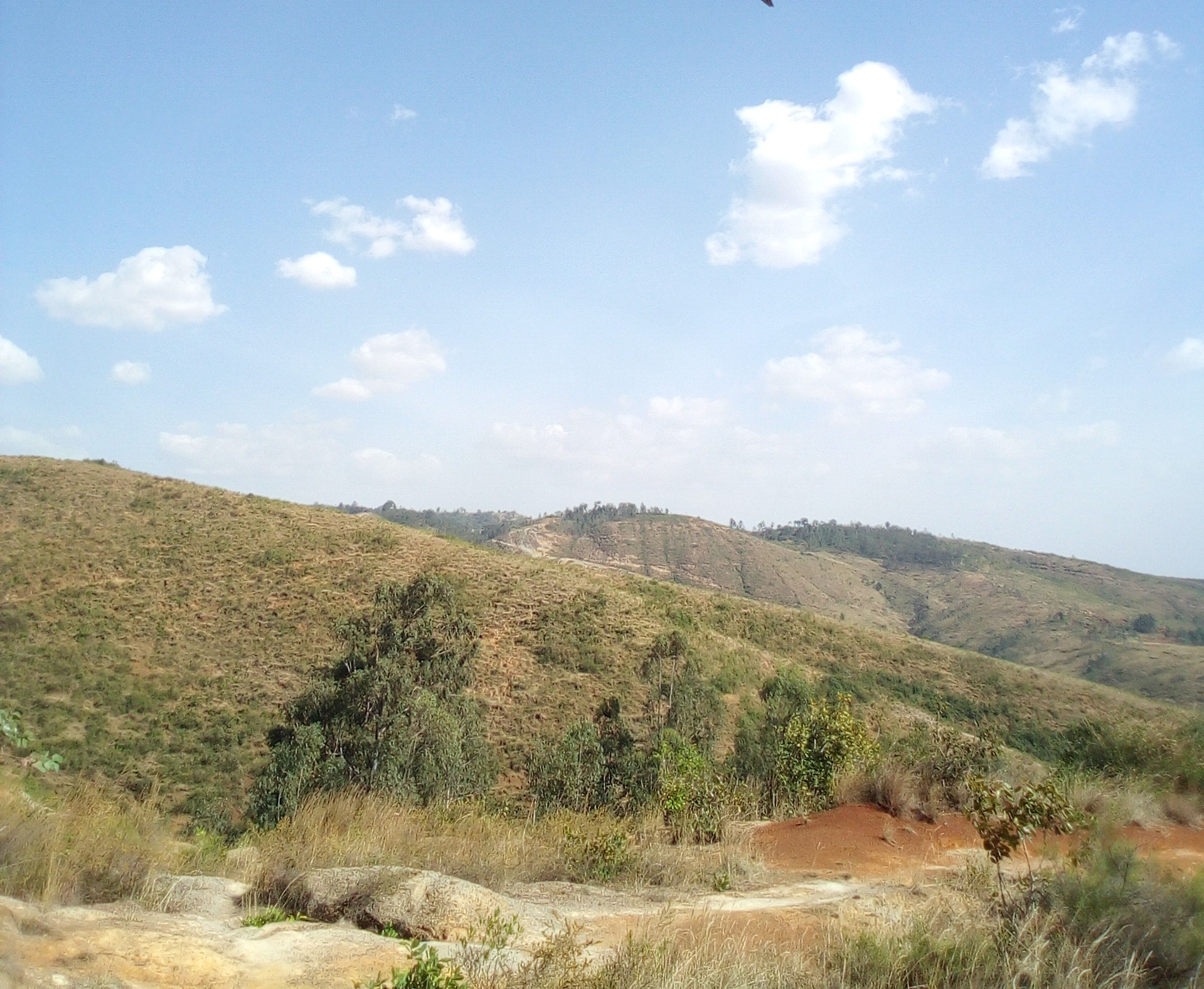
Damot Weyide

Through undulating hills there are no large forests except in the Sodo Zuria, and Omo river basin, which is below 1,500 meters (4,900 ft) and a malaria zone.

In the local view, there are only two regions: the highlands Gezziya and the lowlands Garaa. In the highlands, there are streams and small rivers. Several thermal hot springs are situated around Lake Abaya, with boiling and steaming water.

The soil in Wolayta is predominantly heavy and red in color, turning brown to black during the rainy season. It possesses a sandy texture—fragile and soft when moist—but hardens like brick during dry periods, making ploughing and digging feasible only after rainfall. The soil layer is remarkably deep, averaging around 30 meters in both plains and hills, as confirmed through well drilling. Its fertility supports the cultivation of two crops annually, provided the rains are consistent.

== Climate ==
Wolaita's climate has a bimodal rainfall pattern that lasts from March to October. The first rainy season lasts from March to May. The season lasts from July to October, with a peak in July and August. Over the last 43 years, the average annual rainfall has been 1,014 mm (39.9 in). The average yearly temperature is 19.9 °C, with monthly temperatures ranging from 17.7 °C in July to 22.1 °C in February and March.

The climate is stable, with temperature variation between 24 and 30 °C during the day and 16 to 20 °C at night, all year round. The year is divided into two seasons: the wet season (balgguwaa) from June to October, and the dry season (boniya) from October to June, broken in February by a short period of so-called "little rains" (badhdheesaa). The average rainfall for the entire region is 1,350 millimetres (53 in) per year.

The dry season is marked by strong easterly winds, while the wet season brings heavy rainfall and violent storms—often lasting through the evening or night toward the end of the season. Fog frequently settles in the valleys each morning during the rainy period, dissipating with the first rays of sunlight. Both hail, which can devastate crops, and tornadoes, capable of uprooting trees, are potential hazards in both dry and wet seasons.

== Demographics ==
Based on the 2021 population projection conducted by the Central Statistical Agency of Ethiopia (CSA), the zone has a total population of 6,142,063 (in an area of 4,208.64 square kilometres (1,624.96 sq mi)). Out of the total population of the zone, females count 3,115,050 and males count 3,027,013. Wolayita has a population density of 520.8 per square kilometer.

The 2007 Census conducted by the CSA reported a total population for this Zone of 1,501,112. While 366,567 or 11.49% were urban inhabitants, a further 1,196 or 0.08% were pluralists. A total of 310,454 households were counted in the zone, which resulted in an average of 4.84 persons to a household, and 297,981 housing units. The largest ethnic group reported in the zone was the Wolayta (96.31%); all other ethnic groups made up 3.69% of the population. Wolayttattuwa was spoken as a first language by 96.82% of the inhabitants; the remaining 3.18% spoke all other primary languages reported. 51.34% were Protestants, 43.04% of the population said they practiced Ethiopian Orthodox Christianity, and 5.35% embraced Catholicism.

Religions in Wolaita Zone as of 2007
Protestants	51.34%
Orthodox	43.04%
Catholicism	5.35%
Other faiths (e.g. Islam, Jehovah's Witnesses)	2.3%

== Urbanization ==
Wolaita Zone is composed of sixteen districts and eleven city administrations. There are also different towns and cities in the Wolaita zone. Wolaita Sodo city is administrative and trading center and it is located at the center of roads to and seven entering gates. The followings are urban centres in the Wolaita Zone.

- Achura
- Areka
- Hobicha Bada
- Bale Hawassa
- Badessa
- Beklo Segno
- Bitena
- Buuge
- Boditi
- Bombe
- Dalbo
- Dimtu
- Edo
- Gacheno
- Galcha
- Gara Godo
- Gesuba
- Girara
- Gocho
- Gununo
- Halale
- Hanaze
- Hembecho
- Leera
- Kercheche
- Ladisa
- Lasho
- Oydu Chama
- Paracho
- Shanto
- Tebela
- Wamura
- Wolaita Sodo
- Zaro

== Culture ==
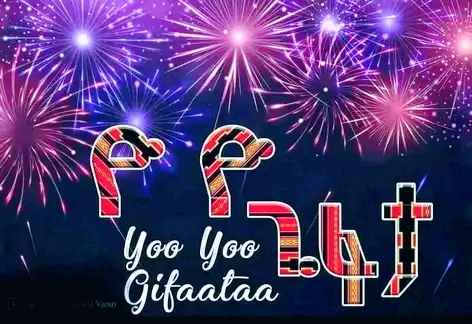

Gifaataa is the most well-known festival among those rituals in Wolaita that has been celebrated annually in the month of September. The festival of New Year in Wolaita called Gifaataa, is celebrated eating the special foods Baacciraa and Muchchuwaa on the eve and throughout the celebration weeks. Gifaataa is Wolaita's New year festival-which Wolaitans had been celebrating many hundred years ago. Gifaataa celebrated in always Sunday in each Year, which falls between Meskerem (September) 14 and 20. Gifaataa is a bridge that brings together all from near and far.

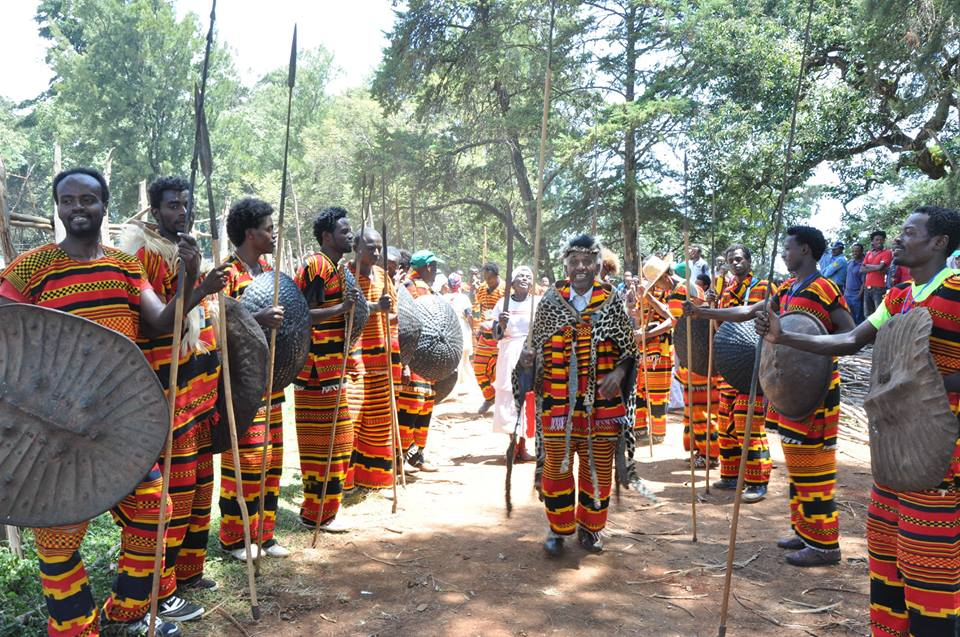
Wolaita war dance

== Tourism ==
Tourists coming into Wolaita Sodo enter the city from Addis Ababa by traveling overland through the Butajira about 310 km (190 mi) or Shashemane roads about 380 km (240 mi). Alternatively, tourists may take the local bus transportation from Addis Ababa to Wolaita or travel by air, flying into Arba Minch and taking land transportation from Arba Minch to Wolaita Sodo. The city has a bus terminal and an airport. However, the latter is not fully functional and does not accept commercial flights.

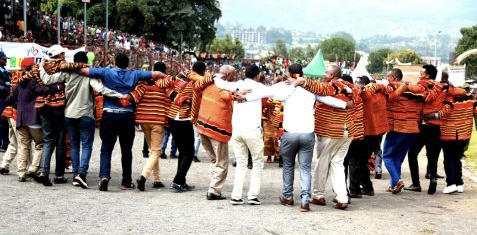
Leke Playing

There are different potential tourist sites, that were selected in the Wolaita Zone to assess the region's ability to capture the natural heritage and cultural heritage tourist markets.

=== Ajora Falls ===
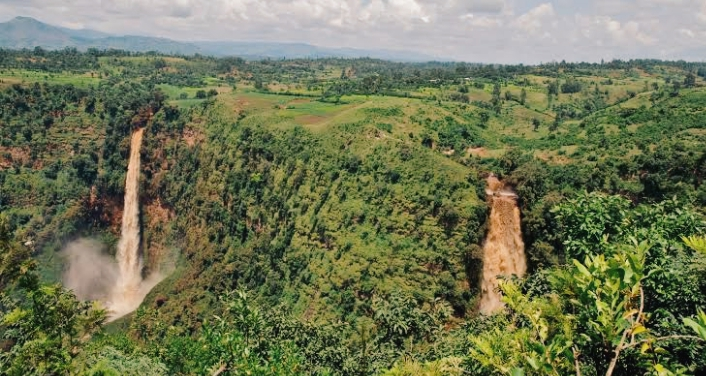
Ajora Falls

The Ajora Falls are twin waterfalls formed by the Ajancho and Skoke rivers located approximately 390 km (240 mi) from Addis Ababa. The Ajancho waterfall drops 210 meters (690 ft) from the edge of the cliff while the Soke is slightly less at 170 meters (560 ft). The 118 falls are located 7 km (4.3 mi) north of the town of Areka, but access to the site requires driving roughly 25 km (16 mi) along a dirt from the town. As with many tourist sites throughout Ethiopia, tourism at Ajora Falls is dominated by domestic tourists, sometimes exceeding foreign tourists by 23 times. Annually the site averages 14 international and 195 domestic tourists.

=== Mochena Borago ===
The Mochena Borago Rockshelter is located northwest of the city of Wolaita Sodo, on the southwestern slope of Mt. Damota. Damota also known as Mount Damot rises over 2,900 m (9,500 ft) above sea level although the Mochena Borago Rockshelter lies at around 2,200 m (7,200 ft) above sea level. In order to access the Mochena Borago Rockshelter, tourists drive approximately, 10 km (6.2 mi) from Wolaita Sodo along the Hosanna road. A sign marks the turnoff for the unpaved road leading to the rockshelter. Over the years, access to the site has become easier. A small trickling waterfall runs off the top of the rockshelter into a stream that runs to the base of the mountain. From 2006 to 2008 the University of Florida’s Southwest Ethiopia Archaeological Project (SWEAP) concentrated upon excavating the shelter’s late Pleistocene deposits.

=== Natural Bridge ===
Natural bridge is found in the Zone within offa district at a distance of 5 k.m from wereda town Gesuba and 29 k.m from zonal administrative town, Wolaita Sodo. The bridge which was made naturally from one big stone lying over the flowing river Manisa. The name of this bridge called (ye egzier dildiy) in Amharic

=== Abala Chokare (Bilbo Hotspring) ===
The hot spring is situated in Abala Abaya district, Abela mareka kebele. The circle shaped hot spring covers wide areas and has rising smoke and boiled bubbles coming from within the ground and the water vapor can be seen from a distance.

=== Mount Damota ===
Damota mountain is found in wolaita zone Sodo Zuria district about 12 k.m away from the town of Wolaita Sodo to the North, and is nearly 3000 meter above sea level.

== Sports ==
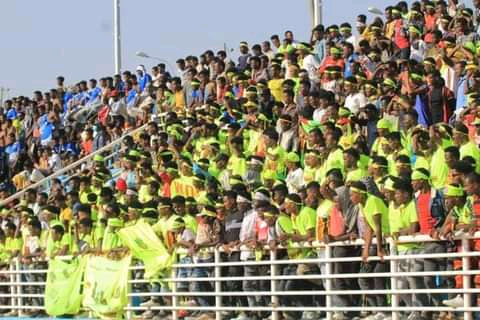
Wolayta Dicha fans

There are different clubs in Wolaita that compete in various sporting activities at a national and continental level. Wolaitta Dicha S.C. is an Ethiopian football club based in Wolaita Sodo. The club was established in 2009 by the Wolayta Development Association. Wolaitta Dicha is a name that now common with East African nationals and even the entire Africa. The club from Southern Ethiopia eliminated Egyptian giants and five times winners of the CAF Champions league Zamalek in a dramatic penalty shootout in Cairo. The club replaced the Wolaita Tussa S.C. before the so-called tussa restructured and came into picture newly. The club got its nickname "Bees of Tona" from the Wolaita Kingdom leader "King Tona" in the 19th century. Wolaitta Dicha S.C. club won its first domestic cup in 2017, and qualified for the 2018 CAF Confederation Cup, in which the club beat Zamalek SC and passed to the quarter-final.

Wolaita Sodo City sport Club is also another which is based in the city of Wolaita Sodo. It was officially established in 2011. The club is participating in Ethiopian First League.

Boditi City F.C. is Ethiopian football club based on the city of Boditi. In 2021 the Club represented Wolayita Zone in the Southern Nations, Nationalities, and Peoples' Region (SNNPR) regional Championship in Jinka, ended its season with a victory.

Wolaita Dicha Men's volleyball team was established in January 2005 E.C. Wolaita Dicha Volleyball Team is sport team based in Wolaita Sodo. The team won Ethiopia volleyball premier league for several times. And as well as represented Ethiopia in the African volleyball club championship of 2019 and 2021.

Areka City F.C. is a club that is based at Areka in Wolaita. It was officially established in 2000. They are a member of the Ethiopian Football Federation and play in the Ethiopian First League.

== Mass media ==
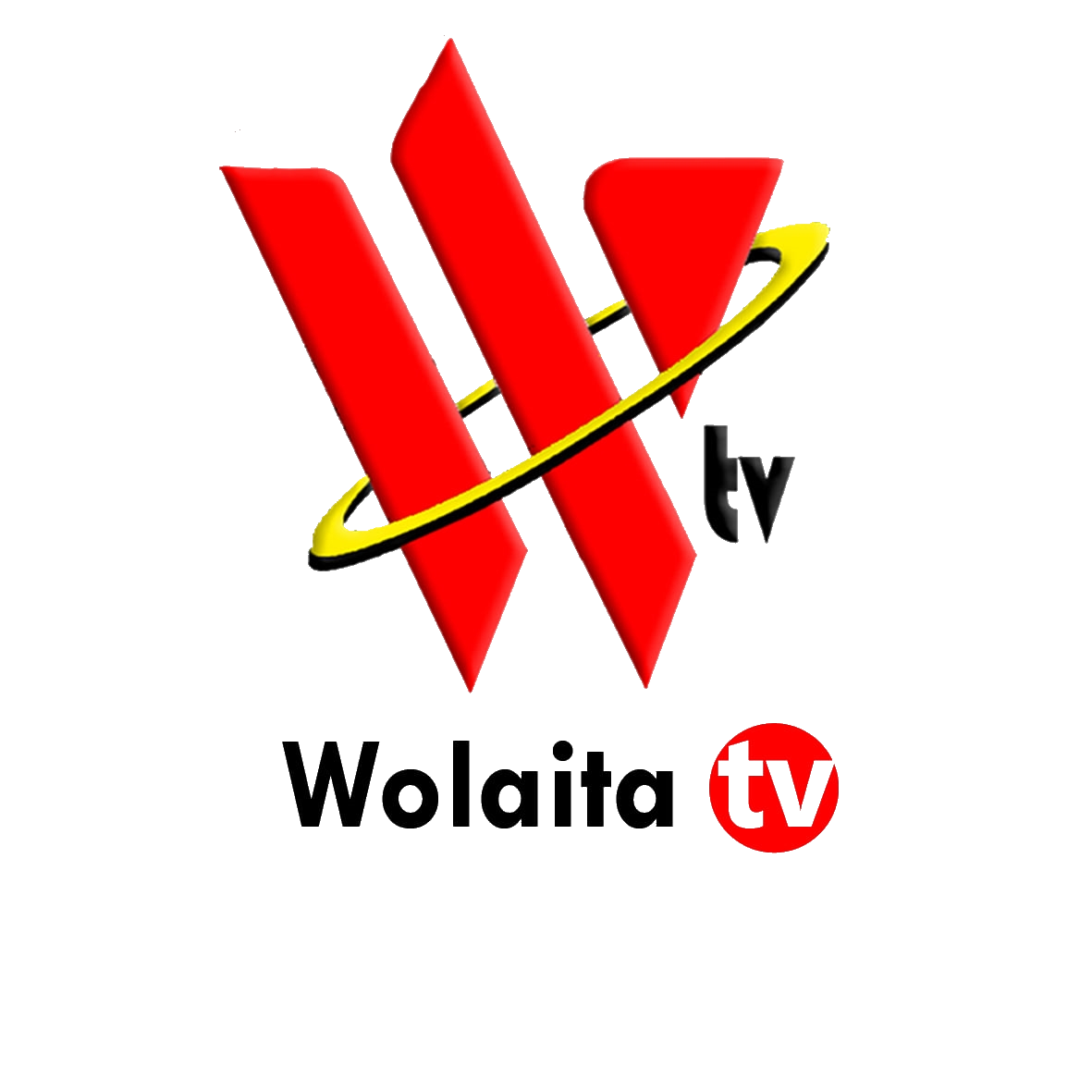
Wolaita tv logo

The Wolaita Zone Administration has made great strides in the social, economic and political spheres over the years in its efforts to achieve rapid and sustainable economic growth by developing a long-term and medium-term plan to alleviate poverty and backwardness and improve the public's access to various media resources. The mass media in wolaita consist of radio, television and the Internet, which remain under the control of the Ethiopian government, as well as private newspapers and magazines. The radio broadcasting stations in Wolaita Sodo include Radio wogeta 96.6 and Radio fana 99.9. Satellite television has been very popular in Ethiopia for many years. In addition to this, Wolaita Tv which made Wolaita Zone accessible to the cultural and historical information of the people of the zone by investing heavily in various media outlets due to the lack of television media in the area.

== Education ==
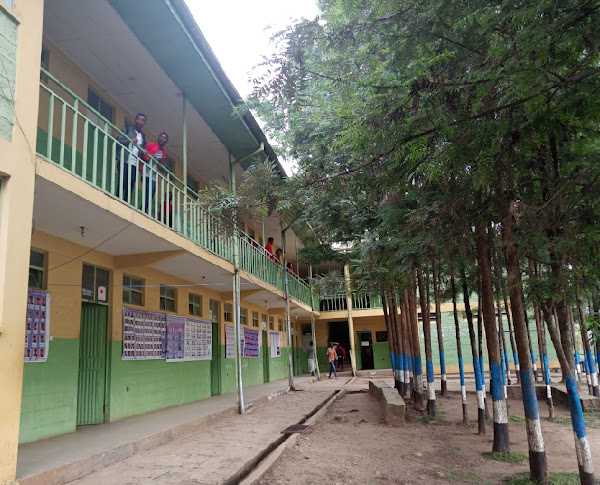
Wolaita Liqa School

Education is a key to ensuring the sustainable socio-economic and political development of a country. Wolaita Zone, in Ethiopia's South Ethiopia Regional State, is a rural and thickly inhabited area. The educational system is struggling to provide excellent instruction and assistance, and secondary schools are in limited supply. To this end to improve education system in the Zone, Zonal education department working with Scotland’s leading international education charity. This organization working to improve education across sub-Saharan Africa and beyond. In Wolaita, there are schools that are among the oldest in Ethiopia; for instance, the Dubbo Our Lady’s Catholic School and Ligaba Aba-Sebsib school, which were established in 1933 and 1945, respectively. Wolaita Sodo University (WSU), established in 2007, is a public higher education institution located in Wolaita Sodo. The university has been engaged in teaching/learning, research and community services. The university has campuses in different areas, such as in Gandaba, Otona and Dawuro Tarcha Campuses.

There are different government and private colleges are opened in Wolaita Zone. Wolayta sodo Agricultural College This college was established in 2001. It is technical and vocational training centre established in Wolaita Sodo city. In addition to these, Wolaita Sodo city schools include Wolaita Sodo Secondary & preparatory school, Wolaita Liqa School and also Bogale Walelu Secondary and Preparatory School.

== List of head administrators of Wolaita Zone ==
Wolaita Zone chief administrators since 2000.

Tenure	Portrait	Incumbent	Affiliation	Notes
2000–2001		Mamo Godebo	SEPDM	
2001 – 2004		Firew Altaye	SEPDEM	
2004 – 2008		Amanuel Otoro	SEPDEM	
2008 – 2010		Haileberhan Zena	SEPDM	
2011 - 2013		Tesfaye Yigezu	SEPDM	
2013 – 2016		Eyob Wate	SEPDM	
2016 – 2018		Asrat Tera	SEPDM	
July 2018 to 13 November 2018		Getahun Garedew	SEPDM	
13 November 2018 to 28 August 2020		Dagato Kumbe	Prosperity Party	Removed from office
28 August 2020 to 19 October 2021		Endrias Geta	Prosperity party	
19 October 2021 to 8 September 2023		Akililu Lemma	Prosperity party	
8 September 2023 to 31 August 2024		Samuel Fola	Prosperity Party	
31 August 2024 to 8 July 2025		Petros Woldemariam	Prosperity Party	
8 July 2025 to present		Samuel Tessema (AP)	Prosperity Party	

== Economy ==
Agriculture is the livelihood for more than 90% of the population in the rural areas. Animal husbandry is complementary to crop production, and the livestock population of Wolayita with estimated standing populations of 685,886 cattle, 87,525 sheep, 90,215 goats, 1951 horses, 669,822 poultry and 38,564 bee hives. Farmers are well known for the production of livestock, predominantly cattle for their organic beef and butter (Million, 2003). They have long tradition of fattening oxen distinctively practiced using local/home based feed supplement/concentrate (cereal grains, root and tuber crops), household leftovers, grass)(Takele and Habtamu, 2009). The Sodo milkshed is also one of the areas with a strong potential to achieve growth in milk production. Maize, haricot bean, taro, sweet potato, enset, banana, avocado, mango and coffee are the major crops with tremendous benefits to smallholder farmers’ in Wolaita and surrounding areas (CSA, 2020). Cassava is also flourishing nowadays. Mixed farming involving the production of cereals, root crops, Enset, and coffee are practiced. Enset is an essential element in Wolayita food economy and acts as a staple, or co-staple, food. Where land is very scarce and consequently where cereal harvests are low, high yielding Enset offers some opportunity for food security. Enset is also popular because of its drought resistant properties.

== Administrative divisions ==
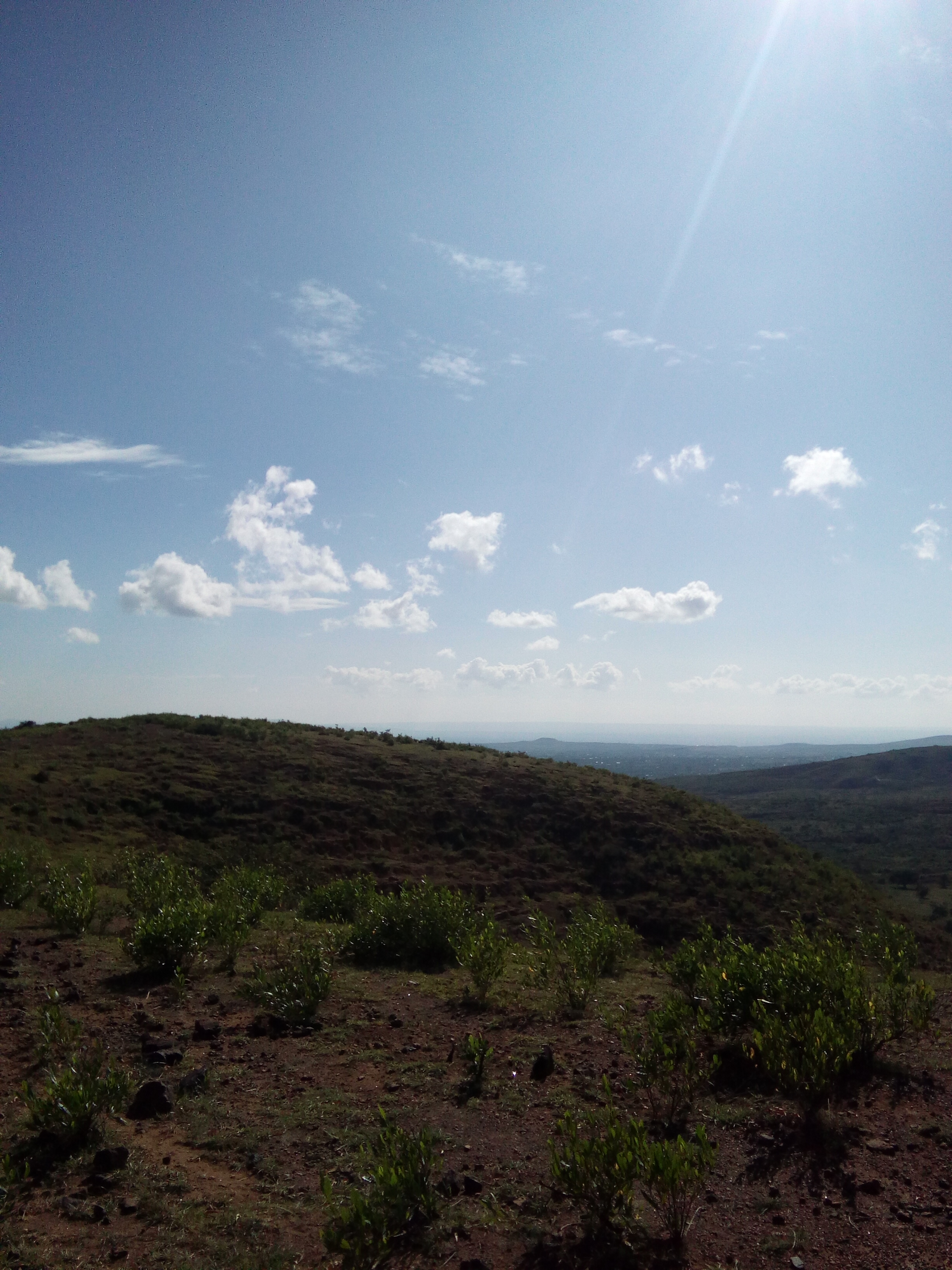
Duguna Pango biittaa utettaa

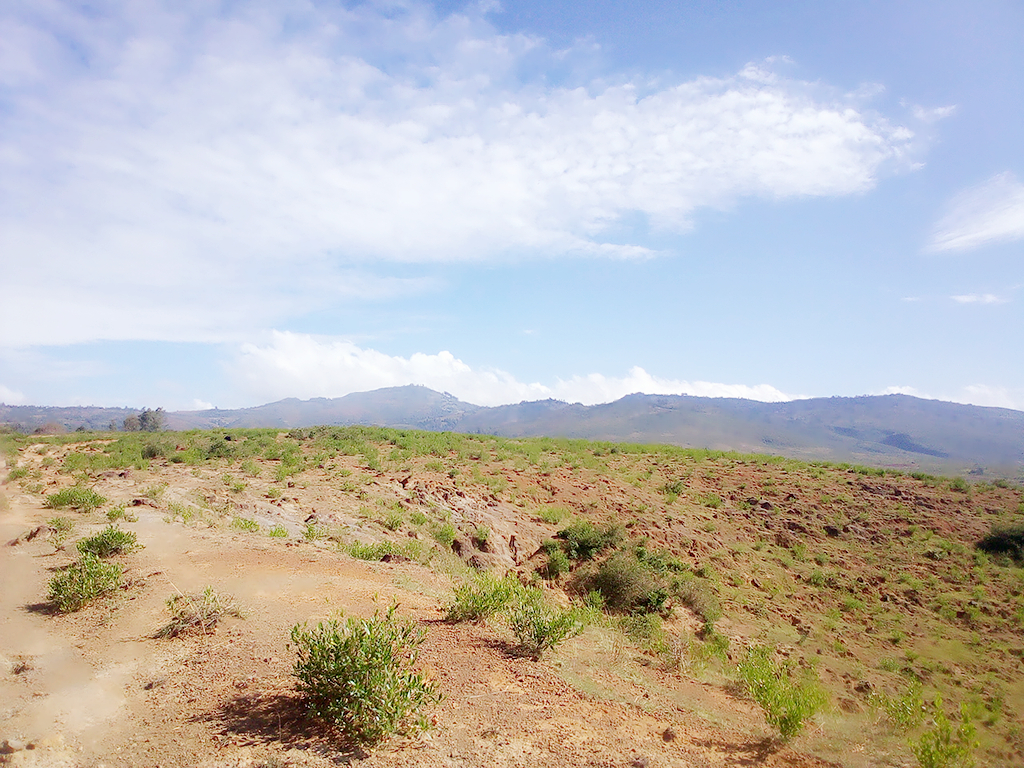
Diguna Fango

Districts and City administrations in Wolaita Zone
Number	Districts	Seat
1	Abala Abaya	Paracho
2	Bayra Koysha	Beklo Segno
3	Boloso Bombe	Bombe*
4	Boloso Sore	Areka*
5	Damot Gale	Boditi*
6	Damot Pulasa	Shanto*
7	Damot Sore	Gununo*
8	Damot Weyde	Bedessa*
9	Diguna Fango	Bitena
10	Hobicha	Bada
11	Humbo	Tebela*
12	Kawo Koysha	Lasho
13	Kindo Didaye	Halale
14	Kindo Koysha	Bale Hawassa*
15	Offa	Gesuba*
16	Sodo Zuria	Wolaita Sodo★

★ City administration, which is directly accountable to Regional government.

* Town administrations, which are considered as district for all administrative purposes and accountable to the Zonal government. Dimtu which is in the Diguna Fango is also one of town administration in this Zone.

== Fauna and Flora ==
In the Wolaita, the spread of animal species is also diverse. Middle-order mammals predominate, with a small population of herbivores and a small number of peripheral species. Throughout the year, eucalyptus, pines, acacia, magnolias, fire trees, and giant sycamores coexist alongside fake banana trees (Uuttaa). Grass may reach three meters in height towards the conclusion of the wet season. The communities are surrounded by enormous fields of grain and, above all, large cotton plantations, which serve as indicators of their wealth. Here is the cotton land, where Ethiopian mantles are manufactured, where this plant thrives, which, together with coffee, is the source of Ethiopia's current wealth and will become the country's major export commodity in the near future. Maize, wheat, durra, barley, and teff are all grown in the area. Many of them may be harvested twice a year. All Mediterranean trees produce fruit throughout the year: grapes, apples, pears, peaches, apricots, oranges, tangerines, bananas, papayas, avocados, and so on.

== Notable persons ==
- Asrat Tera, politician serving as Director General of Livestock Development Institute of Ethiopia since October 2018
- Chernet Gugesa, professional athlete who plays for Ethiopian Premier League club Saint George and the Ethiopia national team
- Dagato Kumbe, former chief adiminstrator of Wolayita Zone and Director General of FDRE Documents Registration and Authentication Service
- Endrias Geta, politician serving as State Minister of Ministry of Irrigation and Lowland and Areas
- Firew Altaye, politician and second chief administrator of Wolayita Zone
- Gebremeskel Chala, Minister of the Ethiopian Trade and Regional Integration
- Getahun Garedew, Director General of FDRE Environment Protection Authority, former State minister at Ministry of Education
- Gildo Kassa, record producer, songwriter and singer
- Haileberhan Zena, politician serving as Deputy chief executive of Federal Housing Corporation since June 2017
- Hailemariam Desalegn, former Prime Minister of Ethiopia
- Kamuzu Kassa, music composer and songwriter
- Kawo Motolomi Sate, founder and king of Kingdom of Wolaita
- Kawo Ogato Sana, king of the Kingdom of Wolaita along with Tigre dynasty.
- Kawo Tona Gaga, the last king of Kingdom of Wolaita
- Kawo Sana Tube, 9th king from Wolaita Tigre dynasty during Kingdom of Wolaita
- Mengistu Haile Mariam, soldier and politician who was the head of state of Ethiopia from 1977 to 1991 and General Secretary of the Workers' Party of Ethiopia from 1984 to 1991
- Roman Tesfaye, First Lady of Ethiopia (2012–2018)
- Samuel Urkato, commissioner of Federal Anti-corruption Commission, also served as Minister of Ministry of Science and Higher Education
- Sancho Gebre, singer, choreographer and dancer
- Shewit Shanka, is an Ethiopian politician who has served as minister of Ministry of Culture and Sport Ethiopia
- Teklewold Atnafu, politician who governed the National Bank of Ethiopia for nearly two decades
- Tesfaye Yigezu, politician serving as Deputy president of South Ethiopia Regional State
- Teshome Toga, Ambassador to China
