= Wamura =

Town in Wolaita, Ethiopia

Wamura: Waamura Ambbaa (Wolaytta); ዋሙራ (Amharic)
- Town
- Location within Ethiopia Wamura (Africa)
- Coordinates: 6°45′59″N 37°22′16″E
- Country: Ethiopia
- Region: South Ethiopia Regional State
- Zone: Wolaita

Area
  - Urban: 7.5 km^{2} (2.9 sq mi)
- Elevation: 1,846 m (6,056 ft)
- Time zone: UTC+3 (EAT)

Wamura (Geʽez: ዋሙራ, Wolayttatto Doonaa: Waamura) is a town in Wolayita Zone of the South Ethiopia Regional State of Ethiopia. The town is found in western part of Kawo Koysha woreda. Wamura is one of municipal administrations in Kawo Koysha woreda. The town has different infrastructures and governmental service centers such as electricity, pure public water, primary and high schools, postal service, telecommunications services, health care institutions and others. Wamura is located in the West of Wolaita Sodo via Sodo-Beklo Segno-Lasho road on the way to Halale.
