= Gesuba =

City in Wolaita, Ethiopia

Gesuba: Gasuubba Ambbaa (Wolaytta); ጋሱባ (Amharic); Gasuba
- City
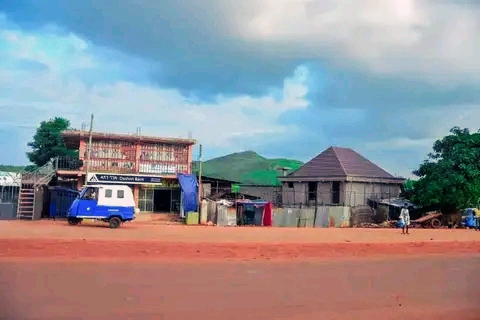
- Gasuba town

- Gesuba within Wolayita Gesuba within Ethiopia
- Coordinates: 6°43′27″N 37°33′24″E
- Country: Ethiopia
- Region: South Ethiopia Regional State
- Zone: Wolaita
- Woreda: Offa Woreda

Government
  - Mayor: Tesfaye Hantalo (Prosperity Party)
- Elevation: 1,549 m (5,082 ft)

Population (2020)
  - Total: 13,927
  - Males: 6,870
  - Females: 7,057
- Time zone: UTC+3 (EAT)

Gesuba (Ge'ez: ገሱባ) or (Wolayttattuwa: Gasuubba) is a city and separate district in Wolaita Zone, Ethiopia. The approximate distance from the city of Sodo is about 33 kilometers to Southwest. And also the distance from Addis Ababa to Gesuba is 352 km via Butajira-Sodo to South. Gesuba city is used as an administrative capital of Offa district. It is located at an elevation of 1,549 meters above sea level. Gesuba is a populated place in Southern Ethiopia. Gesuba city is one of the eleven municipal administrations found in Wolaita Zone, South Ethiopia. It is a city with more than 30,000 populations and has two high schools. The amenities in the city are 24 hours electric light, pure water service, kindergarten, primary and high schools, health center, everyday public market and others. Gesuba lies between about 6°43'27"N 37°33'24"E.

== Climate ==
October and September are moderately hot autumn months in Gesuba, Wolaita, Ethiopia with average temperature varying between 13.9 °C (57 °F) and 25.9 °C (78.6 °F). In October, the average high-temperature is essentially the same as in September is a still warm 25.9 °C (78.6 °F).

Climate data for Gesuba
Month	Jan	Feb	Mar	Apr	May	Jun	Jul	Aug	Sep	Oct	Nov	Dec	Year
Mean daily maximum °C (°F)	28 (82)	30 (86)	30 (86)	26 (79)	23 (73)	22 (72)	18 (64)	21 (70)	21 (70)	23 (73)	23 (73)	27 (81)	24 (76)
Daily mean °C (°F)	23 (73)	25 (77)	25 (77)	22 (72)	20 (68)	19 (66)	16 (61)	19 (66)	19 (66)	20 (68)	21 (70)	23 (73)	21 (70)
Mean daily minimum °C (°F)	17 (63)	19 (66)	19 (66)	17 (63)	15 (59)	15 (59)	12 (54)	15 (59)	16 (61)	16 (61)	16 (61)	16 (61)	16 (61)
Average precipitation mm (inches)	19.48 (0.77)	37.28 (1.47)	108.60 (4.28)	218.97 (8.62)	189.23 (7.45)	148.77 (5.86)	174.74 (6.88)	175.23 (6.90)	189.11 (7.45)	127.83 (5.03)	63.96 (2.52)	23.52 (0.93)	1,476.72 (58.16)
Source: worldweatheronline.com

== Demographics ==
Gesuba is one of populated places in the South Ethiopia Regional State. Gesuba has a total population of 13,927. Among these Males count 6,870 and Females count 7,057.
