= Gifaataa =

Wolaita New Year holiday

Gifaataa ጊፋታ
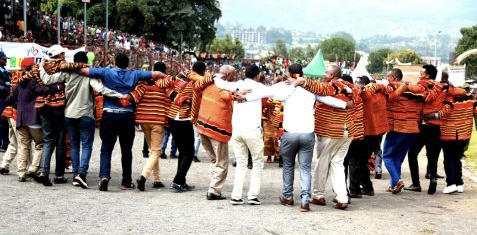
- Men playing leke
- Observed by: Wolayta people
- Significance: First day of the year in Wolaita
- Celebrations: Family members and kinship gathered and eat special meals prepared from meat cheese; Invitations of neighbours making of compromise if there is disagreements among neighbours and relatives.; Playing of Leke etc.
- Date: September (based on lunar calendar)
- 2025 date: 21 September
- 2026 date: 20 September
- 2027 date: 19 September
- 2028 date: 24 September
- Duration: 4 days (Thursday, Friday, Saturday and Sunday)
- Frequency: Annual
- Related to: New Year

Gifaataa, Wolaita people New Year festival
- UNESCO Intangible Cultural Heritage
- Country: Ethiopia
- Reference: 02315
- Region: Africa

Inscription history
- Inscription: 2025 (20th session)
- List: Representative

Gifaataa is a cultural festival celebrated by the Wolayta people in the Southern Region of Ethiopia within Wolayita Zone. The festival is celebrated each year in September, where the Wolayta accept the New Year and send off the old one. Gifaataa means "the beginning," and is also considered the bridge from old to new, dark to light. During Gifaataa the Wolayta dance and enjoy cultural foods. The significance of Gifaata is to eliminate issues of the past and start afresh, reconciling past quarrels and strengthening family and community ties moving forward.

== Chronology ==
The royal advisers are summoned to the palace by census experts, when the old year draws to a close. Then, the royal advisors go out at night to determine the roots of the lunar cycle, the four parts of the moon: i.e. (poo'uwa, xumaa, xeeruwa, Goobanaa) and come with the numbered signs of the year and observe the full moon cycle and announce it to the king and his advisers. After telling the king exactly the date, they return home with a reward, and the king's approach to the festival will be told to the people by proclamation at the market and public meetings.

== Recognition ==
Gifaataa as inscribed in the UNESCO's Representative List of the Intangible Cultural Heritage of Humanity in 2025. The addition listed under file reference 02315 for the 2025 cycle marks international recognition of the festival's unique cultural significance. The decision acknowledges Gifaataa's role in preserving ancient traditions of communal reconciliation, renewal of social bonds, sharing of food and local drink, music and dance, and transmission of Wolaita identity from generation to generation.
