= Haileberhan Zena =

Ethiopian politician

- Zeena Haylebiraana
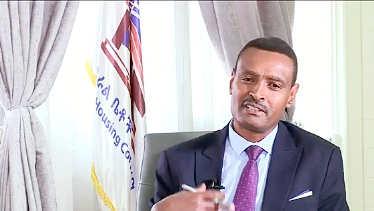
- Haileberhan Zena 2024

Wolayita Zone Administration Office

Chief Administrator
- In office November 2006 – September 2010
- Preceded by: Amanuel Otoro
- Succeeded by: Tesfaye Yigezu

Former SNNPR's Bureau of Finance and Economic Development

Bureau Head
- In office September 2010 – December 2016

Wondo Trading and Investment PLC

General manager
- In office January 2017 – April 2017

Federal Housing Corporation

Deputy CEO
- Incumbent
- Assumed office June 2017

Personal details
- Party: Prosperity Party
- Education: Addis Ababa University; Open University

Haileberhan Zena Mamo is an Ethiopian politician who is serving as deputy chief executive of Federal Housing Corporation since June 2017. Haileberhan is from the Welayta people and he was chief administrator of Wolayita Zone from November 2006 to September 2010.

== Career ==
Haileberhan has served his country in different roles. He served as chief Adiminstrator of Wolayita Zone for nearly four years. He also served as a head of the former Southern Nations, Nationalities, and Peoples' Region's Bureau of Finance and Economic Development. Haileberhan Zena was served as general manager at Wondo Trading and Investment PLC. Currently, he is serving deputy chief executive of the Federal Housing Corporation starting from 2017.
