= Bedessa, Wolaita =

Town in Wolaita, Ethiopia

Bedessa: Baddeessa (Wolaytta); በዴሳ (Amharic)
- Town
- Location within Wolayita Location within Ethiopia
- Coordinates: 6°52′58.9″N 37°55′58.5″E
- Country: Ethiopia
- Region: South Ethiopia Regional State
- Zone: Wolaita

Government
  - Mayor: Daniel Tademe

Area
  - Urban: 7.55 km^{2} (2.92 sq mi)
- Elevation: 1,500 m (4,900 ft)

Population (2018)
  - Town: 35,294
- Time zone: UTC+3 (EAT)

Bedessa (Geʽez: በዴሳ, Wolayttattuwa: Baddeessa) is a town and separate district in Wolayita Zone of the South Ethiopia Regional State, Ethiopia. The town is administrative capital of Damot Weyde district of Wolayita Zone, Ethiopia. Bedessa is located about 373 KM away from Addis Ababa to the south on Sodo-Dimtu-Hawassa road, and 21 KM away from Sodo, the capital of Wolaita Zone. The amenities in the town are, 24 hours electricity, pure public water, banks, schools, postal service, telecommunications services and others. The town has a wire bridge which connects the town with other surrounding communities. Bedessa lies between 6°52'58.9"N 37°55'58.5"E.

== Demography ==
Based on the 2018 population projection by the Central Statistical Agency of Ethiopia, Bedessa has a total population of 35,294, of whom 20,855 are women and 14,439 are men. The majority of the inhabitants were Protestants (86.61%) and 8.0% practiced Ethiopian Orthodox Christianity, 0.86% were Muslims, and 1.28% were Catholics.
