= Dagato Kumbe =

Ethiopian politician

- Kumbbe Dagata (Wolaytta)
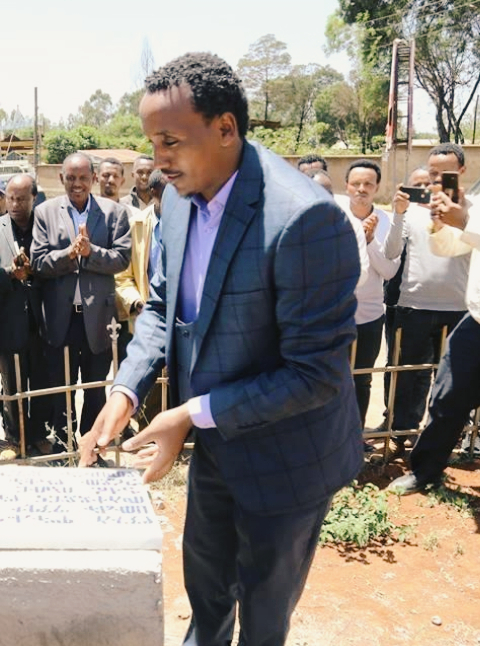

Wolayita Zone Administration Office

Chief Administrator
- In office 13 November 2018 – 28 August 2020
- Preceded by: Getahun Garedew
- Succeeded by: Endrias Geta

FDRE Documents Registration and Authentication Service

Director General
- In office 28 December 2022 – 18 January 2024
- Appointed by: Abiy Ahmed
- Preceded by: Muluken Amare
- Succeeded by: Hamid Kiniso

Ethiopian Investment Commission

Deputy commissioner
- In office 18 January 2024 – 10 October 2026
- Appointed by: Abiy Ahmed
- Preceded by: Lelise Neme

Ministry of Industry

State Minister
- Incumbent
- Assumed office 10 October 2026

Personal details
- Education: Arba Minch University; Wolaita Sodo University

Dagato Kumbe Kolcha, is an Ethiopian politician who has served as Deputy commissioner of Ethiopian Investment Commission since January 2024 to 10 October 2026. Currently he is working as State Minister of FDRE Ministry of Industry since 08 October 2026. Dagato is from the Wolaita people and previously served as chief administrator of Wolayita Zone.

== Career ==
Dagato has worked from the Damot Pulasa District Justice Office to the Justice Department of Wolaita Zone. Dagato has worked as the administrator of Wolayita Zone for almost two years since 2018. He is one of the former leaders whose name comes to the fore in relation to the question of the statehood of Wolaita. On 28 August 2020 the region's branch of the incumbent Prosperity Party (PP) has ousted Dagato Kumbe as chief administrator of Wolaita zone. The incident caused the arrest of him and other higher officials. In December 2022 he was appointed as Director General of FDRE Documents Registration and Authentication Service by Prime minister Abiy Ahmed.
