= Offa (woreda) =

District in South Ethiopia Regional State

Coordinates: 6°45′N 37°30′E

Oofa District: Oofa Allaanaa (Wolaytta); ኦፋ ወረዳ (Amharic)
- Woreda
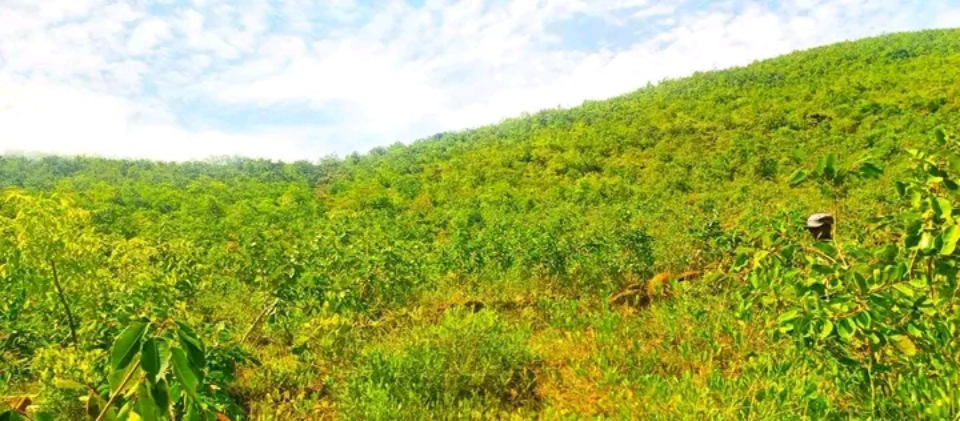
- Ofa District landform
- Interactive map of Oofa District
- Country: Ethiopia
- Region: South Ethiopia Regional State
- Zone: Wolaita
- Seat: Gesuba

Government
  - Chief administrator: Teferi Lera (Prosperity Party)

Population (2019)
  - Total: 134,259
  - Male: 65,733
  - Female: 68,526
- Time zone: UTC+3 (EAT)

Offa is one of the districts in the South Ethiopia Regional State of Ethiopia. It is a Part of the Wolayita Zone. Offa is bordered on the south by the Gamo Zone, on the west by Kindo Didaye, on the north by Kindo Koysha, on the northeast by Sodo Zuria, on the north by Kawo Koysha and on the east by Humbo woredas. The administrative center of Offa is Gesuba. Western part of Offa was added to Kindo Didaye woreda in 1998 E.C.

According to a 2004 report, Offa had 22 kilometers of all-weather roads and 56 kilometers of dry-weather roads, for an average road density of 133 kilometers per 1,000 square kilometers.

Prior to the 2005 Ethiopian general elections, Amnesty International reports that a total of 38 Coalition for Unity and Democracy members were arrested in Offa between 11 and 17 February, and held for seven days on the accusation they held their campaign meeting without giving police 48 hours' notice. Amnesty International included this incident as part of a series of government intimidation of opposition party activists.

== Demographics ==
Based on the 2019 population projection conducted by the CSA, this woreda has a total population of 134,259, of whom 65,733 are men and 68,526 women. The majority of the inhabitants were Protestants, with 85.55% of the population reporting that belief, 11.97% practiced Ethiopian Orthodox Christianity, and 1.1% were Catholic.

The 1994 national census reported a total population for this woreda of 111,384 of whom 55,323 were men and 56,061 were women; 2,931 or 2.63% of its population were urban dwellers. The largest ethnic group reported in Offa was the Welayta (99.21%); all other ethnic groups made up 0.79% of the population. Welayta was the dominant first language, spoken by 99.34% of the inhabitants; the remaining 0.66% spoke all other primary languages reported.
