= Gebremeskel Chala =

Ethiopian politician (born 1984)

- Caala Gebremasqqala

FDRE Urban Job Creation and Food Security Agency

Director General
- In office 3 March 2020 – 6 October 2021
- Preceded by: Markos Bayuh
- Succeeded by: Bekele Mengistu

Ministry of FDRE Trade and Regional Integration

Minister
- In office 6 October 2021 – 28 June 2024
- Appointed by: Abiy Ahmed
- Preceded by: Melaku Alebel
- Succeeded by: Kassahun Gofe

South Ethiopia Regional State Office of the President

Deputy President
- In office 28 June 2024 – 15 February 2025
- Appointed by: SERS Council
- Preceded by: Tesfaye Yigezu

South Ethiopia Regional State Prosperity Party office

Office Head
- Incumbent
- Assumed office 15 February 2025

Personal details
- Born: 1984 (age 41–42) Gacheno, Ethiopia
- Education: Addis Ababa University; Delhi University

Gebremeskel Chala Motalo (Dr.) is an Ethiopian politician serving as head of South Ethiopia Regional State's Prosperity Party Office since February 2025. He also served as Minister of FDRE Ministry of Trade and Regional Integration since October 2021. Gebremeskel is from Wolaita people. Gebremeskel Chala previously served as director general of FDRE Urban Job Creation and Food Security Agency.

== Career ==
Gebremeskel has served Ethiopia in different capacities including Ethiopian Federal urban job creation and food security agency director general to ministerial level. He is also negotiator to Ethiopia accession to World trade organization.

Political offices
Preceded by Markos Bayuh	Director General of FDRE Urban Job Creation and Food Security Agency; 2020–2021	Succeeded by Bekele Mengistu
Preceded by Melaku Alebel	Minister at Ministry of FDRE Trade and Regional Integration; 2021–2024	Succeeded by Kassahun Gofe
Preceded by Tesfaye Yigezu	Deputy President of South Ethiopia Regional State; June 2024–February 2025	Succeeded by Abebayehu Tadese
Preceded by Alemayehu Bawudi	Head of South Ethiopia Regional State's Prosperity Party Office; February 2025–Present	Incumbent
