= Kindo Didaye =

Kindo Didaye: Kinddo Diidaye Allaanaa (Wolaytta); ኪንዶ ዲድዬ ወረዳ (Amharic)
- Woreda
- Interactive map of Kindo Didaye
- Country: Ethiopia
- Region: South Ethiopia
- Zone: Wolaita
- Seat: Halale

Government
  - Chief administrator: Worku Ababa (Prosperity Party)

Population (2019)
  - Total: 122,061
  - Male: 47,864
  - Female: 49,702
- Time zone: UTC+3 (EAT)

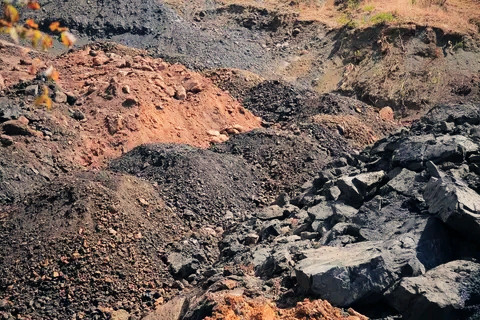
coal mine in Kindo Didaye

Kindo Didaye is one of the woredas in the South Ethiopia Regional State of Ethiopia. It is a Part of the Wolayita Zone. Kindo Didaye is bordered on the south by the Gamo Zone, on the west by the Dawro Zone, on the northeast by Kindo Koysha, and on the east by Offa and Kawo Koysha woredas. Kindo Didaye was separated from Offa woreda and Kindo Koysha woreda in 1998 E.C.

== Demographics ==
Based on the 2019 population projection conducted by the CSA, this woreda has a total population of 122,061, of whom 47,864 are men and 49,702 women; 1,427 or 1.46% of its population are urban dwellers. The majority of the inhabitants were Protestants, with 70.65% of the population reporting that belief, 19.08% practiced Ethiopian Orthodox Christianity, and 6.07% practiced traditional beliefs.
