= Tesfaye Yigezu =

Ethiopian politician

- Igazo Tasfaaya

Wolayita Zone Administration

Chief Administrator
- In office 2011–2013
- Preceded by: Haileberhan Zena
- Succeeded by: Eyob Wate

SNNPR Bureau of Urban Development and Construction

Head
- In office 2013–2019

Southern Ethiopia People's Regional State

Deputy president
- In office 2019 – August 2023
- Appointed by: SNNPR state council

South Ethiopia Regional State Administration

Deputy president
- In office August 2023 – June 2024
- Appointed by: SERS state council

Ministry of Irrigation and Lowlands

State Minister
- Incumbent
- Assumed office August 9, 2024
- Appointed by: Abiy Ahmed

Personal details
- Party: Prosperity Party

Tesfaye Yigezu Kelka is an Ethiopian politician who is serving as the State Minister of Ministry of Irrigation and lowlands since August 9, 2024. Tesfaye is from the Wolaitans and he was chief administrator of Wolayita Zone from 2011 to 2013.

== Career ==
Tesfaye has served his country in different levels. He served as chief Adiminstrator of Wolayita Zone for two years. He also headed the former SNNPR's Urban development and construction bureau. Tesfaye Yigezu was vice president of SNNPR until its dissolution in August 2023. Tesfaye has served as deputy president of the South Ethiopia Regional State starting from its establishment.
