= Bombe, Wolaita =

Town in Wolaita, Ethiopia

Bombe: Bombbe (Wolaytta); ቦምቤ (Amharic)
- Town
- Bombe within Wolayita Bombe within Ethiopia
- Coordinates: 7°07′19″N 37°34′54″E
- Country: Ethiopia
- Region: South Ethiopia Regional State
- Zone: Wolaita
- Woreda: Boloso Bombe

Government
  - Mayor: Erdachew Tadesse (Prosperity Party)
- Elevation: 1,531 m (5,023 ft)

Population (2019)
  - Total: 11,969
  - Males: 6,045
  - Females: 5,924
- Time zone: UTC+3 (EAT)

Bombe (Geʽez: ቦምቤ) is a town and separate district in Wolayita Zone of the South Ethiopia Regional State, Ethiopia. Bombe town is located 325 km (202 mi) and 55 km (34 mi) away from Addis Ababa and Wolaita Sodo town through Hossana exit, respectively. Bombe town is used as an administrative capital of Boloso Bombe woreda of Wolaita Zone. It is located at an elevation of 1,531 meters (5,023 ft) above sea level. The amenities in the town are 24 hours electric light, pure water service, kindergarten, primary and high schools, health center, everyday public market and others. Bombe lies between about 7°07'19"North 37°34'54"East

== Demographics ==
Bombe is a populated place in South Ethiopia Regional State. It is a town with more than 11,000 people. As per population projection conducted by Central Statistical Agency of Ethiopia in 2019, the town Bombe has a total population of 11,969. And among this figure Males count 6,045 and Females count 5,924.
