= Halale =

Town in Wolaita, Ethiopia

Halale: Halaale Ambbaa (Wolaytta); ሀላሌ (Amharic)
- Town
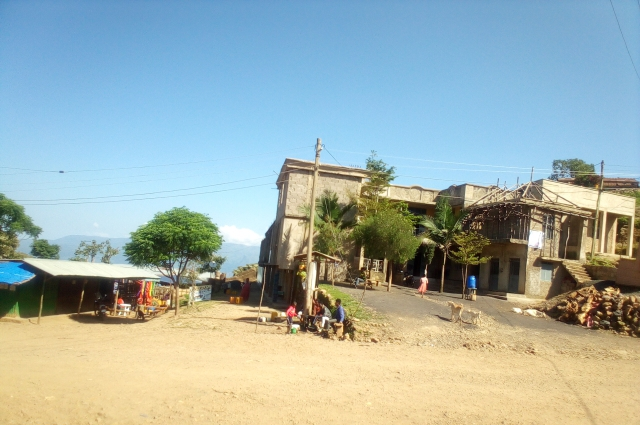
- Halale town center

- Location within Ethiopia
- Coordinates: 6°45′13.982″N 37°20′31.452″E
- Country: Ethiopia
- Region: South Ethiopia Regional State
- Zone: Wolaita
- District: Kindo Didaye
- Elevation: 1,757 m (5,764 ft)

Population (2023)
  - Total: 4,009
- Time zone: UTC+3 (East Africa Time)

Halale (Geʽez: ሀላሌ) is a town in Wolayita Zone, of South Ethiopia Regional State, Ethiopia. The elevation of the town in meter is 1757. The town is n administrative capital of Kindo Didaye woreda of wolaita zone. And Halale Town lies between 6°47'24"N 37°22'52"E.

== Demographics ==
Halale is one of densely populated areas in South Ethiopia Regional State. Total estimated population of the town as of 2007 is 4,009, among this figures female population accounts 2,023 and male population accounts 1,986. As 2023 population projection done by Central Statistical Agency of Ethiopia the town population counts 4,009.
