= Boloso Bombe =

Boloso Bombe: Bolooso Bombbe (Wolaytta); ቦሎሶ ቦምቤ ወረዳ (Amharic)
- District
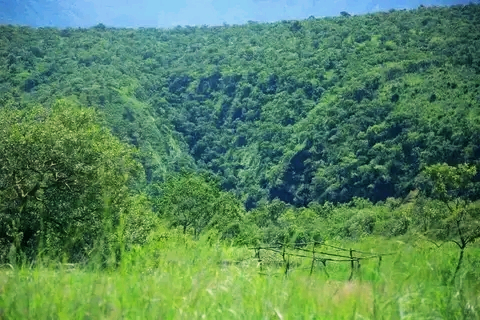
- Forest in Boloso Bombe
- Interactive map of Boloso Bombe
- Country: Ethiopia
- Region: South Ethiopia Regional State
- Zone: Wolaita
- Seat: Bombe

Government
  - Chief administrator: Tadesse Zekarias (Prosperity Party)

Population (2019)
  - Total: 109,789
  - Male: 53,460
  - Female: 56,329
- Time zone: UTC+3 (EAT)

Boloso Bombe is one of the woredas in the South Ethiopia Regional State of Ethiopia part of the Wolayita Zone. Boloso Bombe is bordered on the south by Kindo Koysha, on the west by the Dawro Zone, on the north by the Kembata Zone, on the east by Boloso Sore, northwest by Tembaro Special Woreda and on the southeast by Damot Sore. The administrative center of this woreda is Bombe, which has a latitude and longitude of 7°08′15.1"N 37° 34'54.1"E.

== Demographics ==
Based on the 2019 population projection conducted by the CSA, this woreda has a total population of 109,789, of whom 53,460 are men and 56,329 women; 1,057 or 1.2% of its population are urban dwellers. The majority of the inhabitants were Protestants, with 69.27% of the population reporting that belief, 26.86% practiced Ethiopian Orthodox Christianity, and 1.26% were Catholic.
