= Damot Weyde =

District in Southern Nations, Nationalities, and Peoples' Region, Ethiopia

Coordinates: 6°50′N 38°00′E

Damot Weyde: Daamoota Woyde (Wolaytta); ዳሞት ወይዴ (Amharic)
- District
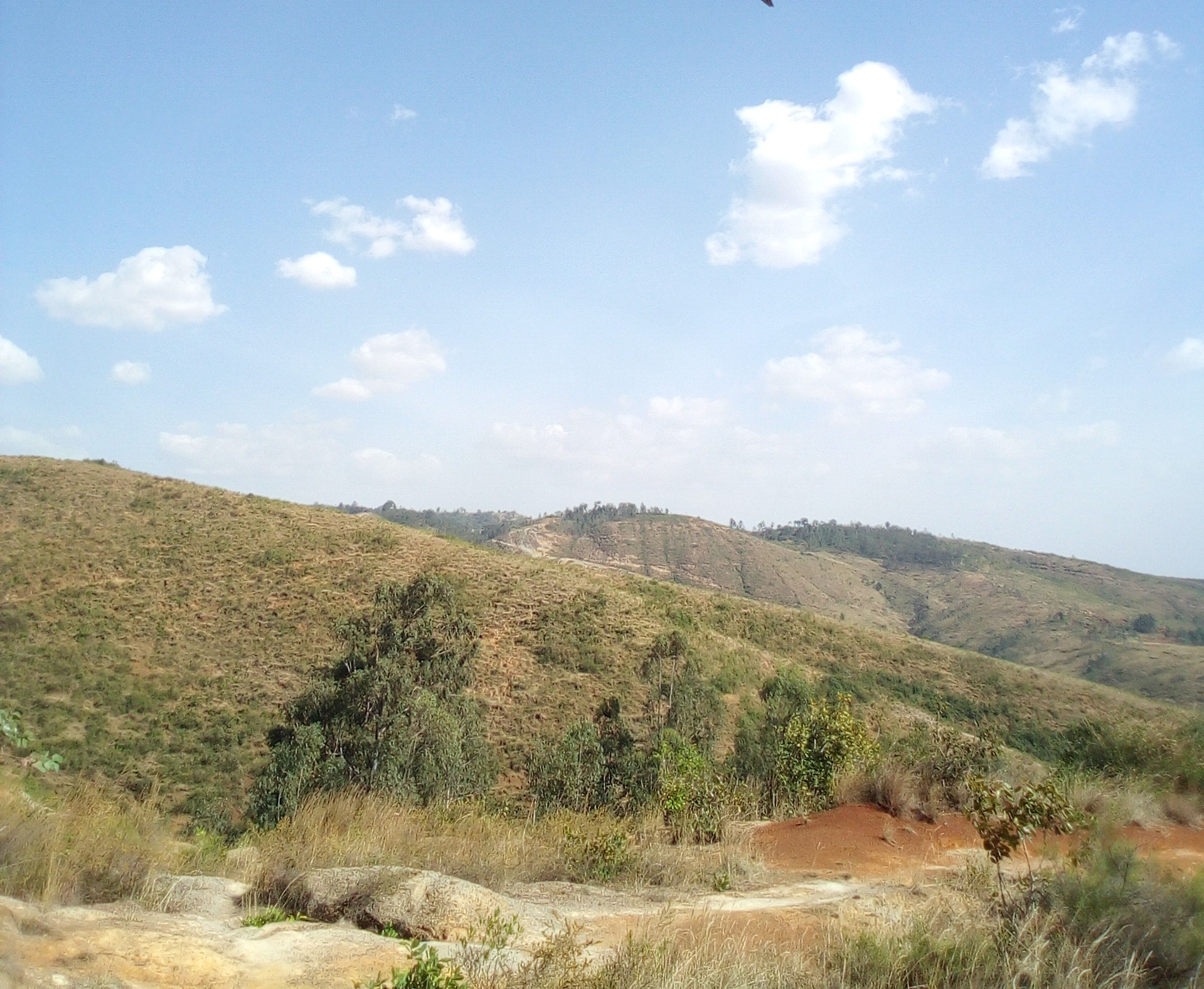
- Interactive map of Damot Weyde
- Country: Ethiopia
- Region: South Ethiopia Regional State
- Zone: Wolaita
- Seat: Bedessa

Government
  - Chief administrator: Tekle Toma (Prosperity Party)

Population (2007)
  - Total: 91,602
  - Male: 44,861
  - Female: 46,741

Damot Weyde is a district in South Ethiopia Regional State of Ethiopia. It is a part of the Wolayita Zone located in the Great Rift Valley, Damot Weyde is bordered on the south by Hobicha, on the west by Sodo Zuria, on the northwest by Damot Gale, on the north and northeast by Diguna Fango. The administrative center of the district is Bedessa.

Damot Weyde has 58 kilometers of all-weather roads and 90 kilometers of dry-weather roads, for an average road density of 191 kilometers per 1000 square kilometers.

Prior to the Ethiopian 2005 General Elections, Amnesty International reports that two activists for the Coalition for Unity and Democracy were arrested while campaigning in this district towards the end of February 2005. Amnesty International included this incident as part of a series of government intimidation of opposition party activists.

== Demographics ==
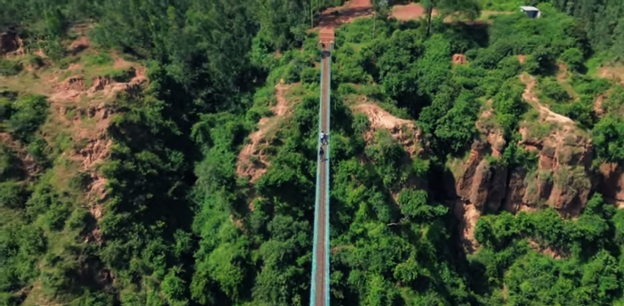
Bambala Bridge

Based on the 2007 Census conducted by the CSA, this district has a total population of 91,602, of whom 44,861 are men and 46,741 women; 5,302 or 5.79% of its population are urban dwellers. The majority of the inhabitants were Protestants, with 70.03% of the population reporting that belief, 24.08% practiced Ethiopian Orthodox Christianity, 4.51% were Catholic, and 1.06% were Muslim.

The 1994 national census reported a total population for this district of 149,650 of whom 74,067 were men and 75,583 were women; 3,800 or 2.54% of its population were urban dwellers. The largest ethnic group reported in Damot Weyde was the Welayta (98.65%); all other ethnic groups made up 1.35% of the population. Welayta was the dominant first language, spoken by 98.81% of the inhabitants; the remaining 1.19% spoke all other primary languages reported. Concerning religious beliefs, the 1994 census reported that 63.73% of the population said they were Protestants, 26.86% practiced Ethiopian Orthodox Christianity, 4.17% were Roman Catholic, and 3.36% were Muslim.
