= Wolaita Sodo University =

Public applied university in Wolaita, South Ethiopia Regional State, Ethiopia

- ወላይታ ሶዶ ዩኒቨርሲቲ (Amharic); Wolaytta Sooddo Yuniversittiya (Wolaytta)
- Motto: ዕውቀትን በተግባር
- Motto in English: Knowledge in practice
- Type: Public
- Established: 24 March 2007; 19 years ago
- President: Guche Gule
- Academic staff: ~1,630
- Students: >35,000 (Fall 2019)
- Undergraduates: 30,991 (Fall 2019)
- Postgraduates: 2,690 (Fall 2019)
- Location: Wolaita Sodo, South Ethiopia Regional State, Ethiopia; 6°49′44.6″N 37°45′03.5″E
- Campus: Urban
- Language: English
- Colors: Crimson
- Website: www.wsu.edu.et
- Location in Ethiopia

Wolaita Sodo University (Ge'ez: ወላይታ ሶዶ ዩኒቨርሲቲ) is a public university in Wolaita Sodo, South Ethiopia Regional State, Ethiopia. It is approximately 339 kilometers (210.65 mile) far from Addis Ababa, Ethiopia in southwest direction. It is one of the second generation universities of Ethiopia. The foundation stone of the university laid by Prime Minister Meles Zenawi. The university has five campuses: Main Campus, Gandaba Campus, Otona Campus, Tarcha Campus and Boditi Campus. Ministry of Science and Higher Education of Ethiopian categorized the university under applied institutions.

Wolaita Sodo University has 58 undergraduate programs, 43 postgraduate programs, 6 Doctor of Philosophy programs, and 4 Medical specialty programs.

== History ==
Wolaita Sodo University was established on 24 March 2007 by proclamation. The university started its duty with 16 undergraduate programs and 807 students. Now over 35,000 active students; until 2019 the university has graduated 57,188 students. There are 1,626 Academic, and 3,770 Administrative staff.

== Colleges and Schools ==
List of the colleges and the number of departments
| Number | Colleges name | Number of departments |
|---|---|---|
| 1 | College of Medicine and Health Science | 11 |
| 2 | College of Natural and Computational Sciences | 9 |
| 3 | College of Agriculture | 14 |
| 4 | College of Education and Behavioral Studies | 04 |
| 5 | College of Engineering | 06 |
| 6 | College of Science and Humanities | 08 |
| 7 | College of Business and Economics | 06 |

The university has three schools namely, School of Informatics, School of Veterinary Medicine and School of Law.

== Community services ==
The university has been involved in community service activities by designing problem solving projects that can ensure the benefit of the community in various fields and based on questions from the community. One of the 87 community service projects approved in 2019 is the digging of deep water wells in Wolayita Zone, Sodo, Bodit, Gununo and Bele towns.

=== Community services in Gununo ===
According to Dr. Mesfin Bibiso, Vice President for Research and Community Service and Associate Deans of Colleges and Schools, experts have proved that the deep well drilling carried out with the support of the community service project is effective and generates 16 liters of water per second, or 1,382,000 liter per day. He said that the previous water supply in the town was 5 liters per second, which is very limited in terms of the city's population, adding that it has been put in place to alleviate the problems of the community.

According to experts, the project, which was implemented in Gununo town on Thursday, 1 October 2020 generates 1,382,000 liters of water per day and will be accessible to more than 130,000 households.

As the university stated its "the project is expected to be implemented in Sodo, Boditi and Bale towns of the zone soon".

== Notable alumni ==
- Professor Takele Tadesse president of the university
- Samuel Urkato, former president of the university
- Senbetie Toma, former president of the university
- Tamirat Motta, former president of the university
- Prof. Tamado Tana, former president of the university

== See also ==
- List of universities and colleges in Ethiopia
- Education in Ethiopia
