= Areka =

City in Wolaita, Ethiopia

Areka: Arakka (Wolaytta); አረካ (Amharic)
- City
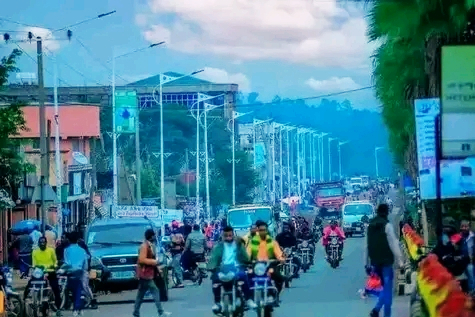
- Areka city main road

- Map showing Areka in Wolayita Map showing Areka in Ethiopia
- Coordinates: 7°04′41″N 37°41′58″E
- Country: Ethiopia
- Region: South Ethiopia Regional State
- Zone: Wolaita
- District: Boloso Sore
- Established: 20 November 1959

Government
  - Mayor: Demeke Dejene (Prosperity Party)
- Elevation: 1,774 m (5,820 ft)

Population (2023)
  - Total: 88,346
  - Male: 42,561
  - Female: 45,785
- Time zone: UTC+3 (EAT)

Areka (Ge'ez: አረካ, Wolayttattuwa: Arakka) is a city in southern Ethiopia. Located in some 300 kilo meters southwest of the capital, Addis Ababa. This city has a latitude and longitude of 7°04′N 37°41′E and an elevation of 1774 meters above sea level. It is the administrative center of Boloso Sore district.

Areka is served by a sub-office of the Ethiopian postal service. Areka was founded in 1959, and a primary school opened in the city in 1962. The Ethiopian Institute of Agricultural Research opened a center in Areka in 1985 dedicated to improving the yield of enset.

== Demographics ==
Based on figures from the Central Statistical Agency in 2023, this city has an estimated total population of 88,346 of whom 42,561 are men and 45,785 are women.

== Climate ==
Areka features a tropical savanna climate (Köppen Aw) with average annual rainfall around 1,290 millimetres or 51 inches.

Climate data for Areka
| Month | Jan | Feb | Mar | Apr | May | Jun | Jul | Aug | Sep | Oct | Nov | Dec | Year |
|---|---|---|---|---|---|---|---|---|---|---|---|---|---|
| Mean daily maximum °C (°F) | 29.9 (85.8) | 30.5 (86.9) | 30.0 (86.0) | 28.6 (83.5) | 27.6 (81.7) | 25.7 (78.3) | 23.7 (74.7) | 24.0 (75.2) | 26.2 (79.2) | 27.9 (82.2) | 29.3 (84.7) | 29.6 (85.3) | 27.8 (82.0) |
| Daily mean °C (°F) | 21.1 (70.0) | 22.0 (71.6) | 21.8 (71.2) | 21.3 (70.3) | 20.5 (68.9) | 19.5 (67.1) | 18.5 (65.3) | 18.6 (65.5) | 19.7 (67.5) | 20.1 (68.2) | 20.8 (69.4) | 20.5 (68.9) | 20.4 (68.7) |
| Mean daily minimum °C (°F) | 12.4 (54.3) | 13.5 (56.3) | 13.7 (56.7) | 14.0 (57.2) | 13.5 (56.3) | 13.4 (56.1) | 13.3 (55.9) | 13.2 (55.8) | 13.3 (55.9) | 12.4 (54.3) | 12.3 (54.1) | 11.5 (52.7) | 13.0 (55.5) |
| Average rainfall mm (inches) | 36 (1.4) | 44 (1.7) | 103 (4.1) | 126 (5.0) | 150 (5.9) | 146 (5.7) | 200 (7.9) | 187 (7.4) | 142 (5.6) | 95 (3.7) | 41 (1.6) | 20 (0.8) | 1,290 (50.8) |
Source: Climate-data.org
