= Kindo Koysha =

District in the South Ethiopia Regional State

Coordinates: 6°50′N 37°30′E

Kindo Koysha: Kinddo Koysha Allaanaa (Wolaytta); ኪንዶ ኮይሻ ወረዳ (Amharic)
- Woreda
- Interactive map of Kindo Koysha
- Country: Ethiopia
- Region: South Ethiopia
- Zone: Wolaita
- Seat: Bale Hawassa

Government
  - Chief administrator: Akako Chama (Prosperity Party)

Population (2019)
  - Total: 136,412
  - Male: 66,546
  - Female: 69,866
- Time zone: UTC+3 (EAT)

Kindo Koysha is a district in the South Ethiopia Regional State of Ethiopia. It is a Part of the Wolayita Zone, Kindo Koysha is bordered on the south by Offa, on the southwest by Kindo Didaye, on the west by the Dawro Zone, on the north by Boloso Bombe, on the west by Damot Sore, on the southwest by Kindo Didaye and on the southeast by Bayra Koysha. The administrative center of Kindo Koysha is Bale Hawassa. Kindo Didaye woreda was separated from Kindo Koysha.

According to a 2004 report, Kindo Koysha had 86 kilometers of all-weather roads and 39 kilometers of dry-weather roads, for an average road density of 161 kilometers per 1000 square kilometers.

== Demographics ==
Based on the 2019 population projection conducted by the CSA, this woreda has a total population of 136,412, of whom 66,546 are men and 69,866 women; 6,590 or 6.3% of its population are urban dwellers. The majority of the inhabitants were Protestants, with 79.82% of the population reporting that belief, 16.73% practiced Ethiopian Orthodox Christianity, 1.52% were Catholic, and 1.18% observed traditional religions.

The 1994 national census reported a total population for this woreda of 140,687 of whom 69,980 were men and 70,707 were women; 3,606 or 2.56% of its population were urban dwellers. The largest ethnic group reported in Damot Weyde was the Welayta (99.46%); all other ethnic groups made up 0.54% of the population. Welayta was the dominant first language, spoken by 99.66% of the inhabitants; the remaining 0.34% spoke all other primary languages reported. Concerning religious beliefs, the 1994 census reported that 39.74% of the population said they were Protestants, 32.49% practiced Ethiopian Orthodox Christianity, 13.83% observed traditional religions, 12.86% were Muslim, and 1.08% were Roman Catholic.
