= Damot Gale =

District in South Ethiopia Regional State

Coordinates: 7°00′N 37°50′E

Damot Gale: Daamoota Gaale Allaanaa (Wolaytta); ዳሞት ጋሌ (Amharic)
- Woreda
- Interactive map of Damot Gale
- Country: Ethiopia
- Region: South Ethiopia Regional State
- Zone: Wolaita
- Seat: Boditi

Government
  - Chief Administrator: Tamirat Kussa (Prosperity Party)

Population (2019)
  - Total: 467,245
  - Male: 233,500
  - Female: 233,745

Damot Gale is a district in South Ethiopia Regional State, Ethiopia. Part of the Wolayita Zone. Damot Gale is bordered on the southwest by Sodo Zuria, on the northwest by Boloso Sore and Damot Pulasa, on the north by the Hadiya Zone, on the east by Diguna Fango, and on the southeast by Damot Weyde. The administrative center of Damot Gale is Boditi. Damot Pulasa woreda was separated from Damot Gale.

Damot Gale has 29 kilometers of asphalt roads, 1 kilometer of all-weather road and 57 kilometers of dry-weather roads, for an average road density of 209 kilometers per 1000 square kilometers.

== History ==
A megalithic site with four steles has been found within Damot Gale.

In March 1996, Damot Gale suffered a hail storm that destroyed not only an estimated 625 hectares of crop land but the roofs of 266 houses. The number of households affected was 1,956, whom the local Committee for Disaster Prevention and Preparation provided with tents and plastic sheets, and to whom the NGO Redd Barna handed out crop seeds.

With the assistance of a €76,200 loan from the Greek government, as of 2006 construction is underway to build the Damte earthen dam, a pilot project which will provide a reliable source of drinkable water for the inhabitants of this woreda. The Ethiopian government hopes to use this project as an example in other areas of the country that faces a water shortage.

== Demographics ==
Based on the 2019 population projection conducted by the CSA, this woreda has a total population of 467,245, of whom 233,500 are men and 233,745 women; 24,133 or 15.97% of its population are urban dwellers. The majority of the inhabitants were Protestants, with 49.15% of the population reporting that belief, 39.71% practiced Ethiopian Orthodox Christianity, 11.11% were Catholic, and 1.38% were Muslim.

The 1994 national census reported a total population for this woreda of 217,336 of whom 107,201 were men and 109,239 were women; 13,400 or 6.17% of its population were urban dwellers. The four largest ethnic groups reported in Damot Gale were the Welayta (94.68%), the Hadiya (2.78%), the Amhara (0.78%), and the Mareqo or Libido (0.77%); all other ethnic groups made up 0.99% of the population. Welayta is spoken as a first language by 96.39%, 1.62% Hadiya, 0.77% Amharic, and 0.61% speak Libido; the remaining 0.61% spoke all other primary languages reported. Concerning religious beliefs, the 1994 census reported that 42.33% of the population said they were Protestants, 34.1% practiced Ethiopian Orthodox Christianity, and 19.94% were Roman Catholic.
