= Boloso Sore =

District in South Ethiopia Regional State

Coordinates: 7°05′N 37°40′E

Boloso Sore: Boloso Soore Allaana (Wolaytta); ቦሎሶ ሶሬ ወረዳ (Amharic)
- District
- Interactive map of Boloso Sore
- Country: Ethiopia
- Region: South Ethiopia Regional State
- Zone: Wolaita
- Seat: Areka

Government
  - Chief administrator: Akililu Philfos (Prosperity Party)

Population (2019)
  - Total: 279,218
  - Male: 134,982
  - Female: 144,236
- Time zone: UTC+3 (EAT)

Boloso Sore is a district in South Ethiopia Regional State, Ethiopia. It is a part of the Wolayita Zone. Boloso Sore is bordered on the south by Sodo Zuria and Damot Sore, on the west by Boloso Bombe, on the northeast by the Kembata Zone and Tembaro special woreda, on the northeast by the Hadiya Zone, on the east by Damot Pulasa, and on the southeast by Damot Gale. The administrative center is at Areka. Boloso Bombe and Damot Sore districts were separated from Boloso Sore.

Landmarks in this district include three megalithic sites with one stele in each; one of these sites is Chama Hembecho. Near the She'a river there is a site with animal engravings; obsidian and ceramic fragments have been observed on the surface of the She'a site.

Boloso Sore has 57 kilometers of all-weather roads and 74 kilometers of dry-weather roads, for an average road density of 206 kilometers per 1000 square kilometers. The district is culturally homogeneous with Welayta-speaking people, though a small but active minority of Protestant and Catholic converts formed a sub-culture.

== History ==
A survey of land reform in the area which became Boloso Sore was performed in 1980-1981 under the direction of Dessalegn Rahmato. It found that Bolosso is "the beneficiary of many years of infrastructural and extension service by the Wolaita Agricultural Development Unit". Further, although the area had been self-sufficient in food in years past, there were clear signs of gradual impoverishment. In a 1971 survey about 30% of Bolosso households did not use ox-drawn ploughs for cultivation; ten years later, 52% of the peasants interviewed did not own oxen.

Prime Minister Tamirat Layne on 1 June 1994 began touring villages affected by famine in Boloso Sore. In this district alone, over 5,000 people had so far died of famine or malaria, 60% of them being children.

In March 1996, Boloso Sore experienced several hail storms in eight rural kebeles, of which two reported severe damage. The district Disaster Prevention and Preparation Committee ameliorated the disaster by distributing seeds provided by the NGO Redd Barna to 4,205 households in five kebeles.

== Demographics ==
Based on the 2019 population projection conducted by the CSA, this district has a total population of 279,218, of whom 144,236 are women and 134,982 are men; 31,408 or 15.87% of its population are urban dwellers. The majority of the inhabitants were Protestants, with 56.83% of the population reporting that belief, 35.07% practiced Ethiopian Orthodox Christianity, and 5.99% were Catholic.

The 1994 national census reported a total population for this district of 247,239 of whom 121,152 were men and 126,087 were women; 17,517 or 7.09% of its population were urban dwellers. (This total consists of an estimate for the inhabitants of part of one rural kebele in this district, who was not counted; the uncounted inhabitants were estimated to have 2,378 inhabitants, of whom 1,190 were men and 1,188 women.) The largest ethnic group reported in Boloso Sore was the Welayta (98.42%), and Welayta was the dominant first language, spoken by 98.6% of the inhabitants. The majority of the inhabitants practiced Ethiopian Orthodox Christianity, with 60.23% of the population reporting they professed that belief, while 33.2% were Protestants, and 4.91% were Roman Catholic.

== Notable Persons ==
1. H/E Haile Mariam Desalegn- Former prime Minister of Ethiopia (2012-2018)

2. Teklewold Atnafu- Former governor of National Bank of Ethiopia since 2000s to 6 February 2020. Currently serving as chair person of Commercial Bank of Ethiopia. He is also a Financial affairs sector advisor of the Prime minister.
