= Welayta =

Welayta, Wolayta, Wolayita or Wolaita may refer to:

- Wolayta people, an ethnic group of Ethiopia
- Wolaytta language, spoken by the Welayta people
- Wolayita Zone, a zone in SNNPR, Ethiopia
- Kingdom of Wolaita, a Welaytta kingdom founded in medieval times surviving until the 19th century, see List of rulers of Welayta

== See also ==
- Welayta Dicha, an Ethiopian football club
