= Koysha =

- Koysha Dam, a hydropower gravity dam in Ethiopia;
- Kawo Koysha, a place in South Ethiopia;
- Bayra Koysha, a place in South Ethiopia;
- Kindo Koysha a district in the South Ethiopia Regional State of Ethiopia
- Koysha Seta (3 July 1971 – 14 May 2018) an Ethiopian singer.
