= Industrial Parks Development Corporation =

Special Economic Zones of Ethiopia
- Type: Government-owned enterprise
- Industry: Industrial development
- Founded: 2014
- Headquarters: Addis Ababa, Ethiopia
- Area served: Ethiopia
- Owner: Government of Ethiopia
- Website: www.ipdc.gov.et

Industrial Parks Development Corporation (IPDC) also known as (Special Economic Zones of Ethiopia) (SEZE) is a government-owned enterprise in Ethiopia responsible for the development, operation, and management of industrial parks across the country. It was established in 2014.

== History ==
Industrial Parks Development Corporation (Special Economic zones of Ethiopia) was established in 2014 as part of Ethiopia’s industrial policy to oversee the development and administration of industrial parks across the country, aligning with the government’s broader objective of industrial-led economic growth. It oversees the administration of 10 special economic zones, 2 industrial parks, and one Free Trade Zone across the country. These special economic zones are positioned along the country's development, taking into account transportation links and resource hubs. It operates under the oversight of the Ethiopian Investment Commission, Ministry of Revenue, customs authority, immigration and coordinates with various stakeholders involved in industrial zone development.

It is responsible for the development and management of industrial parks across Ethiopia, including those located in Hawassa, Bole Lemi, Kombolcha, and Mekelle. These parks host manufacturing and processing companies operating in sectors such as textiles, garments, pharmaceuticals, agro-processing, and electronics.

== Parks ==
- Adama Special Economic Zone
- Kilinto Special Economic Zone
- Dire Dawa Free Trade Zone
- Semera Special Economic Zone
- Hawassa Special Economic Zone
- Kombolcha Special Economic Zone
- Bole Lemi Special Economic Zone
- Mekelle Special Economic Zone
- Jimma Special Economic Zone
- Debre Birhan Special Economic Zone
- Arerti Industrial Park
- Addis Industry Village
