= Dalbo (Wolaita) =

Town in Wolaita, Ethiopia

Dalbo: Dalbo Ambbaa (Wolaytta); ዳልቦ (Amharic)
- Town
- Location within Ethiopia
- Coordinates: 6°54′0″N 37°52′10″E
- Country: Ethiopia
- Region: South Ethiopia Regional State
- Zone: Wolaita
- District: Sodo Zuria
- Elevation: 2,349 m (7,707 ft)
- Time zone: UTC+3 (East Africa Time)

Dalbo (Geʽez: ዳልቦ) is a town in South Ethiopia Regional State, Ethiopia within Wolayita Zone. Dalbo is located about 304 km away from Addis Ababa to the south through Butajira. And the town is located 11 km, North from Sodo, the capital of Wolayita Zone. The coordinate point of the town in map is 6°54′0″N 37°52′0″E with elevation of 2349 meters above the sea level.

== History ==
Dalbo used as a capital city of Kingdom of Wolaita. During his reign, King Gobe managed to inaugurate a telephone network that links Dalbo with Wachamo, the northern neighboring Kingdom of Hadiya. There is also the Royal Palace, which at ground plus one level, was the most sophisticated and built by Europeans standard. Dalbo city had been a center where the diplomats reside and very busy in receiving telephone calls coming from the Red Sea littorals and other places.

After King Menelik II's triumph, the palace and other government offices in Dalbo, the Kingdom of Wolaita's capital and the most populated metropolitan center in colonial Africa, were set on fire. All of the houses, including the magnificent palace of Tona, were turned to ash, including seventy houses in the palace's inner circle that served as residences for top dignitaries, the court, a treasury house, and a meeting center, and 2800 houses of generals, and a warehouse of exportable items in the outer compound.
