= Bayra Koysha =

District in South Ethiopia Regional State

Bayra Koysha: Bayra Koysha Allaanaa (Wolaytta); ባይራ ኮይሻ ወረዳ (Amharic)
- Woreda
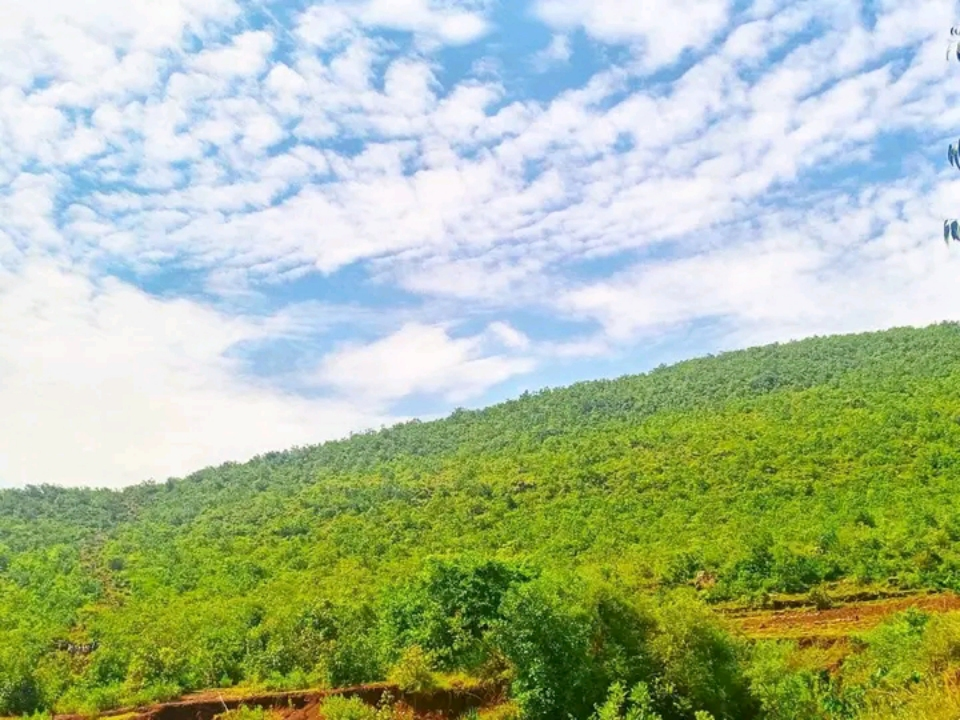
- Bayra Koysha land forms
- Interactive map of Bayra Koysha
- Country: Ethiopia
- Region: South Ethiopia Regional State
- Zone: Wolaita
- Seat: Beklo Segno

Government
  - Chief administrator: Merihun Mena (Prosperity Party)
- Time zone: UTC+3 (EAT)

Bayra Koysha is the woredas in Wolayita Zone of the South Ethiopia Regional State in Ethiopia. Bayra Koysha was established in 2019 from the other surrounding woredas. Bayra Koysha is bordered by Sodo Zuria on east, Damot Sore on north, Kawo Koysha on west and on south Humbo woredas. The administrative town of this woreda is Beklo Segno.
