= Lake Ayalew =

Ethiopian politician

- ላቀ አያሌው

Minister of Revenue
- In office 12 March 2020 – 20 August 2020
- Preceded by: Adanech Abebe
- Succeeded by: Aynalem Nigussie

Chief Administrator of Amhara Region
- Acting
- In office 23 June 2019 – 12 March 2020
- President: Sahle-Work Zewde
- Prime Minister: Abiy Ahmed
- Preceded by: Ambachew Mekonnen
- Succeeded by: Fanta Mandefro

Personal details
- Party: Amhara Democratic Party
- Other political affiliations: Prosperity Party

Lake Ayalew (Amharic: ላቀ አያሌው) is an Ethiopian politician. From March to August 2020, Lake has been appointed as the Minister of Revenue. He was acting President of Amhara Region from 23 June 2019 after the assassination of then-President Ambachew Mekonnen. He remained acting governor of Amhara Region throughout 2019. Lake was a member of Central Committee of the Amhara Democratic Party in October 2018.
