= Ethiopian Customs Commission =

Ethiopian government department

- የኢትዮጵያ ጉምሩክ ኮሚሽን

Agency overview
- Formed: 28 November 2018
- Preceding agencies: Ethiopian Revenues and Customs Authority; Ministry of Revenues
- Jurisdiction: Ethiopia
- Headquarters: Addis Ababa, Ethiopia; 9.018°N 38.798°E
- Annual budget: 97.6 billion birr (2024)
- Agency executive: Debele Kabeta, Commissioner
- Parent department: Ministry of Revenues
- Website: www.ecc.gov.et

The Ethiopian Customs Commission (Amharic: የኢትዮጵያ ጉምሩክ ኮሚሽን; ECC) is an Ethiopian government department responsible for collecting tax and duties, providing and monitoring trade activity. It was established in 2018 under Proclamation No. 1097/2018.

The Commission is responsible to the Ministry of Revenues.

== Background ==
The Ethiopian Customs Commission (ECC) was established by split of the Ethiopian Revenues and Customs Authority (ERCA) and the autonomous the Ministry of Revenues on 29 November 2018 by Proclamation No. 1097/2018. The Commission is accountable to the Ministry of Revenues, responsible of custom laws, regulating and collecting tax and duties and monitoring legal trade activity while combating illegal smuggling and tax evasion.

ECC partners with various organizations including Ethiopian Maritime Authority, Ethiopian Shipping and Logistics Service Enterprise, Ethiopian Railway Corporation, Ministry of Transport and Logistics.

== See also ==
- Ministry of Revenues and Customs Authority
- Ethiopian Shipping and Logistics Service Enterprise
- Ethiopian Railway Corporation
- Ministry of Transport and Logistics
