= Sana Tube =

King of Wolaita from 1707 to 1748

- King

King of the Kingdom of Wolaita
- Reign: 1707-1748
- Predecessor: Tube Libana
- Successor: Ogato Sana
Names
- Kawo Sana Tube
Regnal name
- King Sana
- Dynasty: Wolaita Tigre Dynasty
- Father: Tube

Sana Tube, or Tube Sana in the Wolaitta language, was one of the kings of the Kingdom of Wolaita. He was from the Tigre dynasty. Kawo Sana was the 9th king from the Wolaita Tigre dynasty. During his reign, the pre-colonial Kingdom of Wolaita had fought with the nearby rival peoples and states of Hadiya, Arsi, Gujii, Sidama and Kembata, after he stabilized the kingdom and extended the frontiers to the present areas of Offa, Humbo, Boloso Sore and Damota. The king was highly concerned about the annexation of Wolaita territories by strangers and determined to fight against warriors. He annexed Kulo and Dawuro.

Preceded by Tube Libana	Kingdom of Wolaita	Succeeded by Ogato Sana
