= Aynalem Nigussie =

Ethiopian politician

- አይናለም ንጉሴ

Minister of Revenues and Customs Authority
- Incumbent
- Assumed office 20 August 2020
- President: Sahle-Work Zewde; Taye Atske Selassie
- Prime Minister: Abiy Ahmed
- Preceded by: Lake Ayalew
- Other offices: Vice President of the Wollo University; State Minister of the Ministry of Agriculture and the Economic Cluster Coordinator in the Amhara Region; From May 2023 – Member of the Board of Directors of the Commercial Bank of Ethiopia

Aynalem Nigussie (Amharic: አይናለም ንጉሴ) is an Ethiopian politician who is serving as the Minister of Revenues and Customs Authority since 2020. Previously, she was the Vice President of the Wollo University as well as contributing to government positions such as State Minister of the Ministry of Agriculture and the Economic Cluster Coordinator in the Amhara Region.

== Career ==
Aynalem Nigussie holds a Master’s Degree in Business Administration and a Bachelor’s Degree in Business Management. She has been the Vice President of the University of Wollo, the State Minister of the Ministry of Agriculture, and the Economic Cluster Coordinator in the Amhara Region. On 20 August 2020, she was appointed as the Minister of Revenues and Customs Authority, succeeding Lake Ayalew. In May 2023, she led financial oversight, becoming a member of the Board of Directors of the Commercial Bank of Ethiopia.

During her Minister of Revenue career, Aynalem sought numerous reforms including improved tax administration, resource mobilization, and contributing to transparent governance on public finance.
