= Kamuzu Kassa =

Ethiopian musician

- ካሙዙ ካሳ
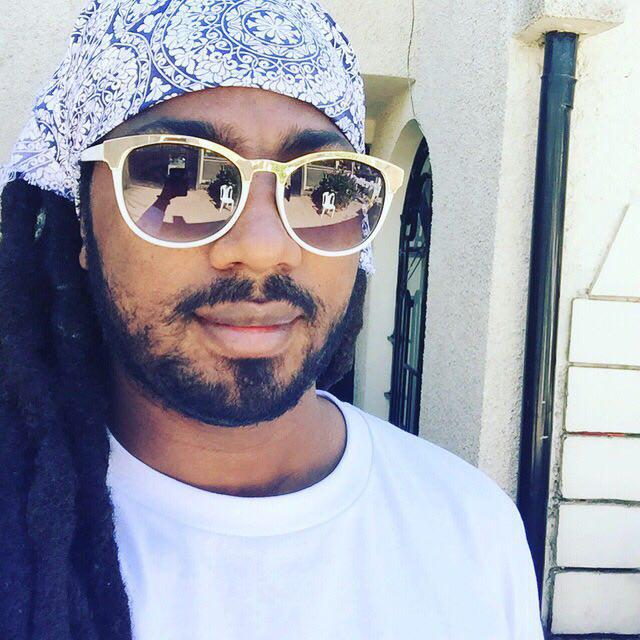
- Born: July 22, 1990; Beklo Segno, Wolayita, Ethiopia
- Occupations: Record producer, songwriter
- Years active: 2006–present

Kamuzu Kassa (Ge'ez: ካሙዙ ካሳ) is an Ethiopian record producer and songwriter. Kamuzu started his career in 2006 composing spiritual songs, and in 2010 started writing Ethiopian popular music.

== Early life ==
Kamuzu was born in Beklo Segno, Wolayita, Ethiopia, and raised in Wolaita Sodo. He was born to a Protestant Christian family and his father was a health professional and the mother a housewife. Kamuzu's passion for music grew in the church choir, and slowly spread to the outside.

Kamuzu attended Bele primary school in the town of Bele (Wolaita), and attended secondary school in Sodo.

== Career ==
Kamuzu composed music for local gospel singer and preacher Eyob Deno's album Halo Bado in 2004. Following this, he started to compose music for non-gospel singers as well. In 2007, he composed a single which is entitled "Aroge Arada" for Kako Getachew and this paved the way for him to the secular world of music.

In 2006, Kamuzu went to Addis Ababa and started to compose music in his own studio called "Shakura". In this studio, he composed more than 2,000 songs.

== Awards ==
The Ethiopian Ministry of Culture and Tourism awarded him for his contribution to Ethiopian music in 2021. Kamuzu was named Addis Music Award's Best Composer of the Year in 2018. Fana Broadcasting Corporate awarded him for his contribution to Ethiopian Music on 27 September 2021.
