= Wolaytta people =

Ethnic group in southern Ethiopia

Wolaytta
Wolaytto (Wolaytta)
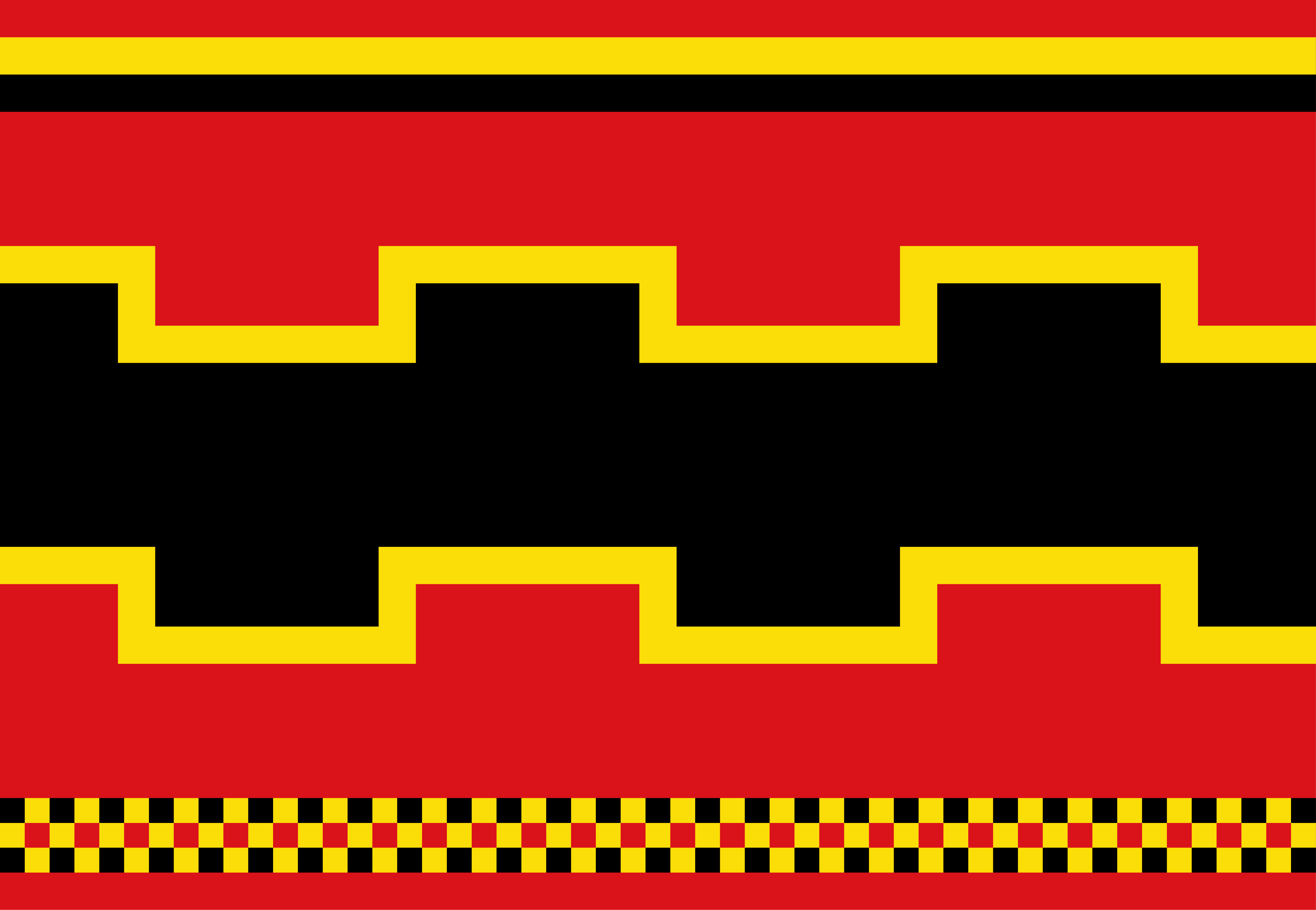
- Wolaytta pattern

Total population
- 1,707,079 (2007)

Regions with significant populations
- Ethiopia

Languages
- Wolayttatto Doonaa (ancestral and primary); Amharic (auxiliary)

Religion
- Significant Majority: Christianity (P'ent'ay); Minority: Islam

Related ethnic groups
- Gamo • Gofa • Dawro • Dorze • Ta-Ne-Omotic speaking peoples.

The Wolaytta (Welayta; Ge'ez: ወላይታ Wolayta) are an ethnic group mostly inhabiting in southern Ethiopia. According to the most recent estimate (2017), the people of Wolayta numbered 5.83 million in Welayta Zone. The language of the Wolayta people, similarly called Wolaitta, belongs to the Omotic branch of the Afro-Asiatic language family. Despite their small population, Wolayta people have widely influenced national music, dance, and cuisine in Ethiopia.

== History ==
The people of Wolayta had their own kingdom for hundreds of years with kings (called "Kawo") and a monarchical administration. The earlier name of the kingdom was allegedly "Damot" - this was said to include the south, south-east, south-west and part of the central region of present Ethiopia. The ruler was King (Kawo) Motolomi who is mentioned in the religious book Gedle Teklehaimanot, as an invader of the north and the king to whom was surrendered the mother of the Ethiopian saint, Tekle Haymanot. Some assume that the saint was the son of this king. After the defeat which overcame the northern part of its territory the kingdom was reduced to its present size and the name became the Kingdom of Wolayta. It remained thus an independent kingdom for hundreds of years until the expansion of Emperor Menelik II into the regions south of Shewa during the early 1890s.

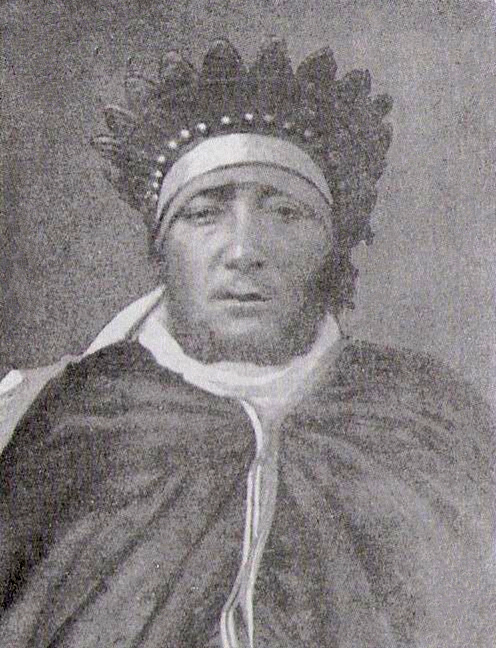
Wolayta king Kawo Tona Gaga

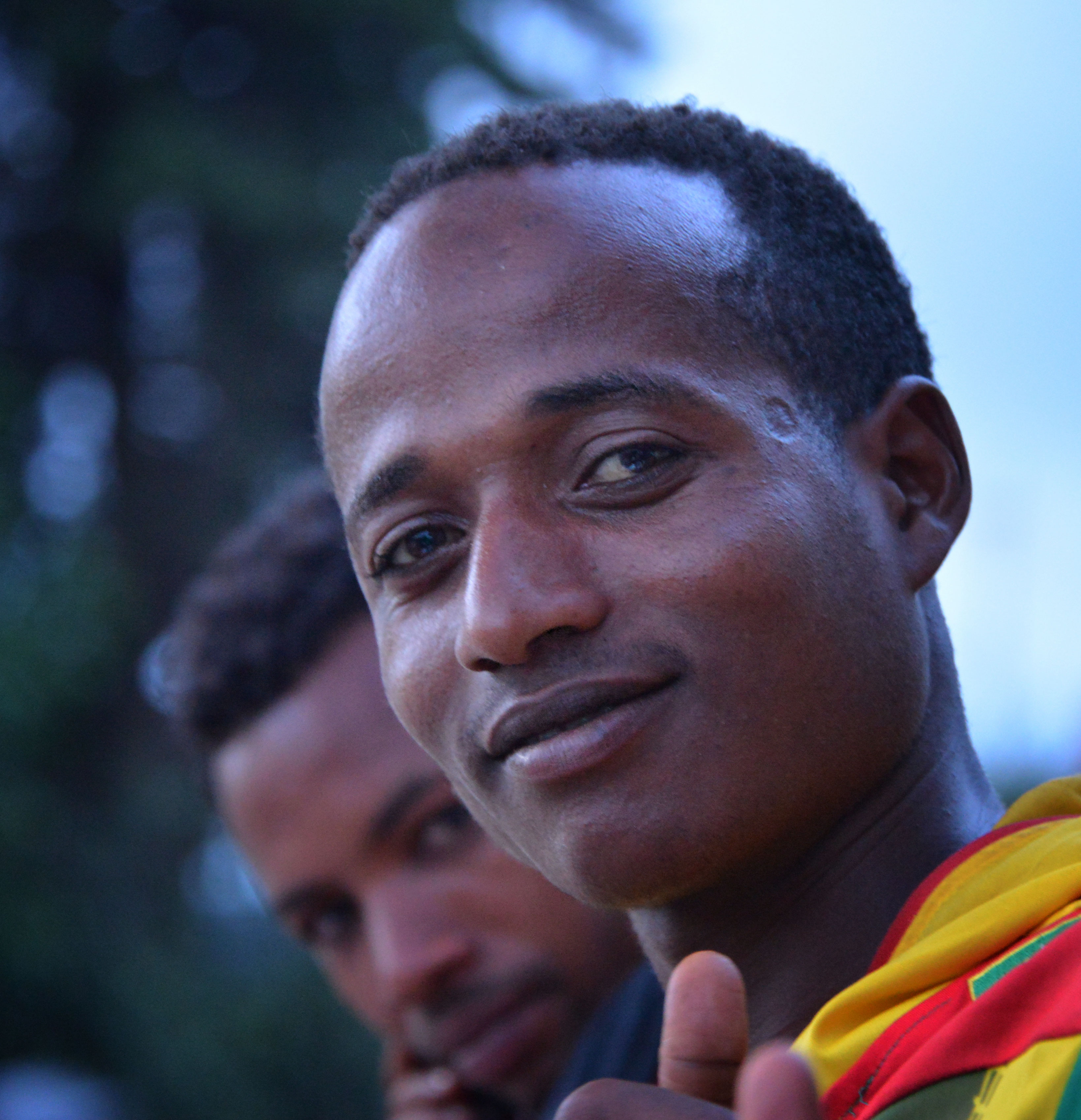
Wolayta men in Ethiopia

The war of conquest has been described by Bahru Zewde as "one of the bloodiest campaigns of the whole period of expansion", and Wolayta oral tradition holds that 118,000 Welayta and 90,000 Shewan troops died in the fighting. Kawo (King) Kawo Tona Gaga, the last king of Welayta, was defeated and Welayta conquered in 1896. Welayta was then incorporated into the Ethiopian Empire. However, Welayta had a form of self-administrative status and was ruled by Governors directly accountable to the king until the fall of Emperor Haile Selassie in 1974. The Derg afterwards restructured the country and included Welayta as a part of the province of Sidamo. The Welayta were previously known as "Wolamo", although this term is now considered derogatory.

In 1991 the Transitional Government of Ethiopia (TGE) restructured the country into ethnically-based Regions, and Welayta became the centre of Region 9. Later, Welayta was included in the Southern Nations, Nationalities, and People's Region (SNNPR, consisting of the former regions 7, 8, 9, 10 and 11) as part of the Semien Omo Zone. The regional government claimed that the Welayta were so closely related to the other Omotic-speaking peoples of that zone that there was no justification for a separate Welayta zone. Welayta leaders, however, stressed that their people had a distinct language and culture and demanded a zone for themselves. In 1998, the regional government attempted to introduce an artificially constructed language, based on the various local North Omotic languages and dialects, as the new language of education and administration for Semien Omo Zone. This triggered violent protests by Welayta students, teachers and civil servants, which led to the withdrawal of the new language. In November 2000, the Welayta Zone was established.

== Wolaytta language ==
Wolaytta is an Omotic language spoken in the Wolaita Zone and some parts of the Southern Nations, Nationalities, and People's Region of Ethiopia. The number of speakers of this language is estimated at 1,800,000 (1991 UBS); it is the native language of the Welayta people.

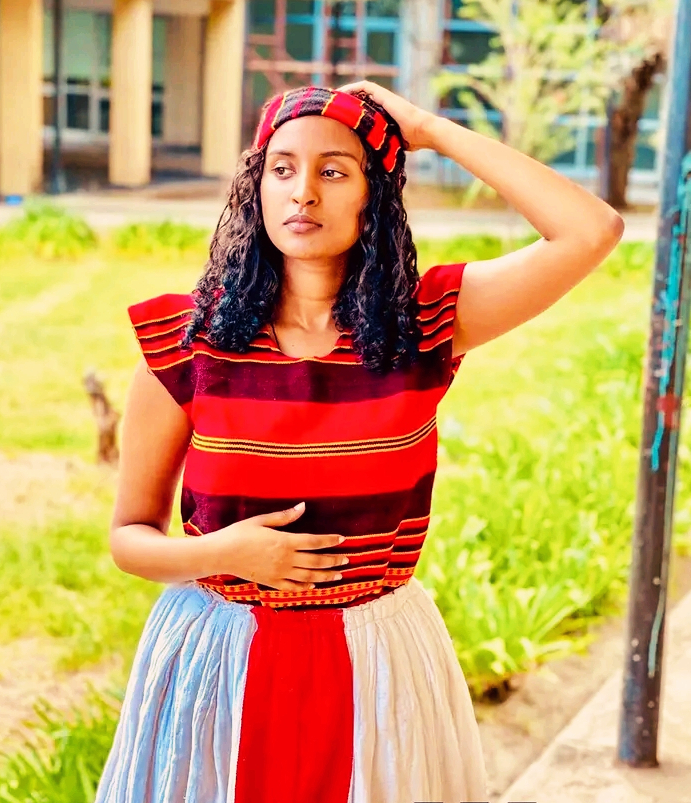
Welayta woman in ethnic apparel.

There are conflicting claims about how widely Welayta is spoken. The 'Ethnologue' identifies one smaller dialect region: Zala. Some hold that Melo, Oyda, and Gamo-Gofa-Dawro are also dialects, but most authorities, including Ethnologue and ISO 639-3 now list these as separate languages. The different communities of speakers also recognize them as separate languages.

Welayta has existed in written form since the 1940s, when the Sudan Interior Mission first devised a system for writing it. The writing system was later revised by a team led by Dr. Bruce Adams. They finished the New Testament in 1981 and the entire Bible in 2002. It was one of the first languages the Derg selected for their literacy campaign (1979–1991). Welaytta pride in their written language led to a fiercely hostile response in 1998 when the Ethiopian government distributed textbooks written in Wegagoda – an artificial language based on amalgamating Wolaytta with several closely related languages. As a result, the textbooks in Wegagoda were withdrawn and teachers returned to ones in Wolaytta.

The Welayta people use many proverbs. A large collection of them was published in 1987 (Ethiopian calendar) by the Academy of Ethiopian Languages. Fikre Alemayehu's 2012 MA thesis from Addis Ababa University provides an analysis of Wolaytta proverbs and their functions.

== Welayta music ==
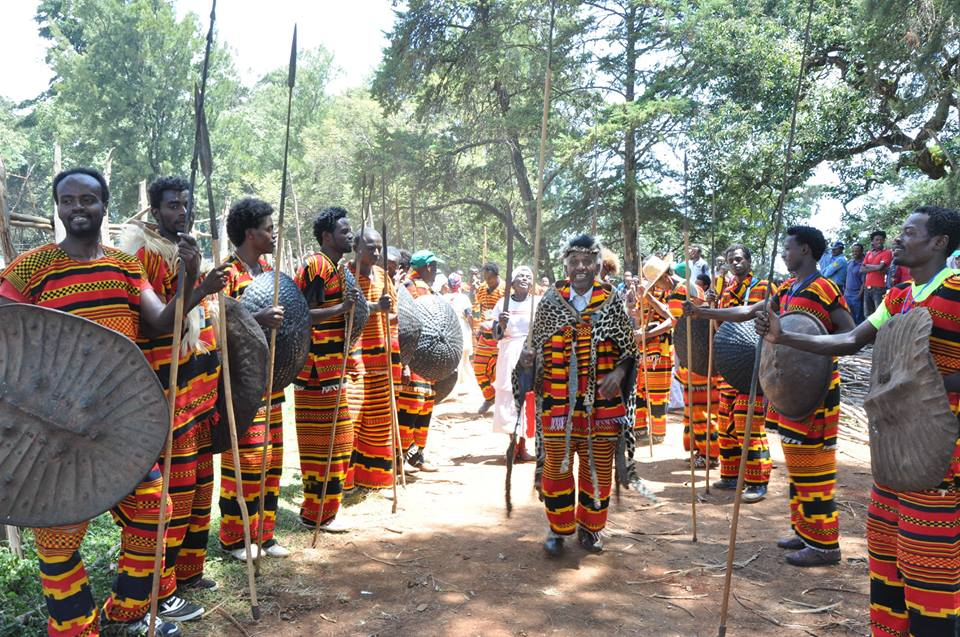
Welayta men wearing traditional clothing.

Welayta music plays a prominent role in national entertainment in Ethiopia. The unique and fast-paced Welayta tunes have influenced several styles and rhythm as it continues to shape the identity of Ethiopian musical diversity. Various famous Ethiopian artists from other ethnic groups have incorporated Welayta musical style into their songs, including vocalists Tibebu Workeye, Teddy afro and Tsehaye Yohannes. Just as influential are Welayta traditional dance forms that are often adopted by musicians and widely visible in Ethiopian music videos.

== Food ==
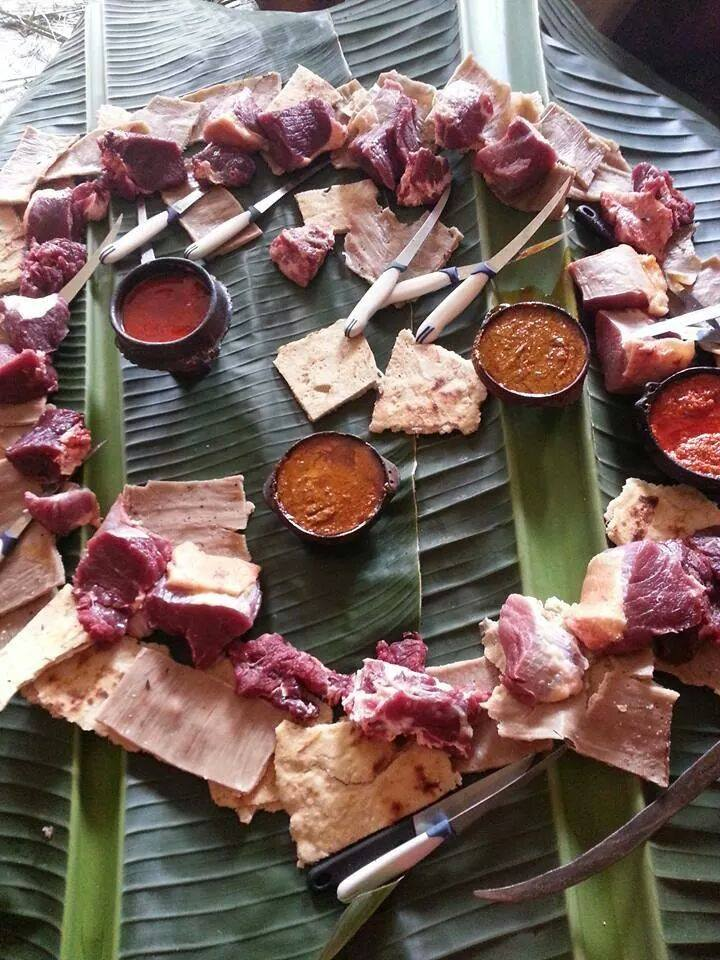
Kurt, traditional raw beef dish

Raw beef, commonly known as kurt, is deep rooted cultural food of the Welayta people. Little is known on the origin of raw meat eating habit. Minced raw beef called kitfo by the Gurage people and Kurt are mostly served on special occasions such as holidays like "Finding of the True Cross" or Meskel holiday, celebrated annually on September 27 in Ethiopia. Moreover, enset foods are traditionally incorporated into cultural events such as births, deaths, weddings, and rites of planting, harvesting and purification.

== Currencies ==
Wolaita people used different type of currencies through their kingdoms for trade purpose. Among them Karetta Sinna and Shalluwa, both of the products of cotton, are the priors. But next to this currencies Wolaita people achieved one of the most important civilizations in the sphere of currency and created a currency made from metal pieces, which is called Marchuwa. Marchuwa is equal to 18 Maria Theresa Thalers or 0.50 US dollars.

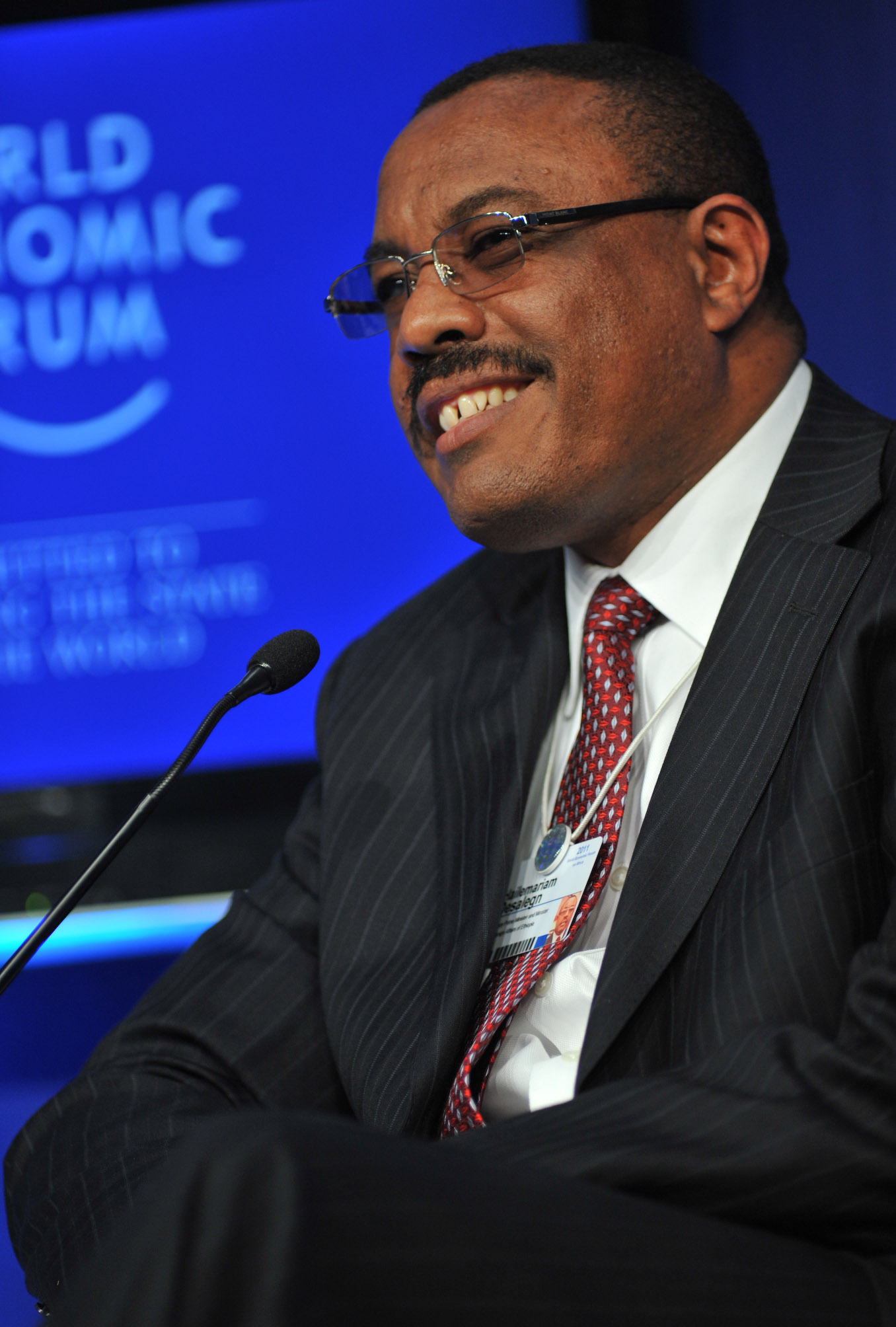
Hailemariam in Closing Plenary: Africa's Next Chapter - World Economic Forum on Africa 2011

== Origins ==
The Wolayta are of multi-social origin, meaning they are historically, culturally, and ethnically, products of continuous (im)migration from numerous ethnic groups, making them heterogeneous. Due to this continuity, the number of clans has increased to over 200+ contemporarily.

== Notable people ==
- Teklewold Atnafu, Governor of National Bank of Ethiopia since 2000s to February 2020 and chair of Commercial Bank of Ethiopia since February 2020.
- Hailemariam Desalegn – Former Prime Minister of Ethiopia from 2012-2018
- Getahun Garedew, Ethiopian politician serving as Director general of FDRE environmental protection authority
- Endrias Geta, Ethiopian politician serving as State Minister of Ministry of Irrigation and Lowland and Areas
- Dagato Kumbe, Ethiopian politician serving as Deputy commissioner of Ethiopian Investment Commission
- Shewit Shanka, Ethiopian politician who is serving as minister of Ministry of Culture and Sport Ethiopia
- Roman Tesfaye – First Lady of Ethiopia (2012–2018). Previously held senior management positions in the United Nations Development Program and other offices
- Teshome Toga – Ethiopia's Ambassador to EU, Speaker of the 3rd House of the Peoples' Representatives
- Samuel Urkato - Minister of Science and Higher Education since 18 August 2020. He was president of Wolaita Sodo University, and Minister of Mines and Petroleum (2018 – 18 August 2020)
- Haileberhan Zena, Ethiopian politician who is serving as Deputy chief executive of Federal Housing Corporation

== See also ==
- Kingdom of Wolaita
- List of rulers of Welayta
- Wolaytta language
