= Gedion Timothewos =

Ethiopian politician

- ጌድዮን ቲሞጢዎስ
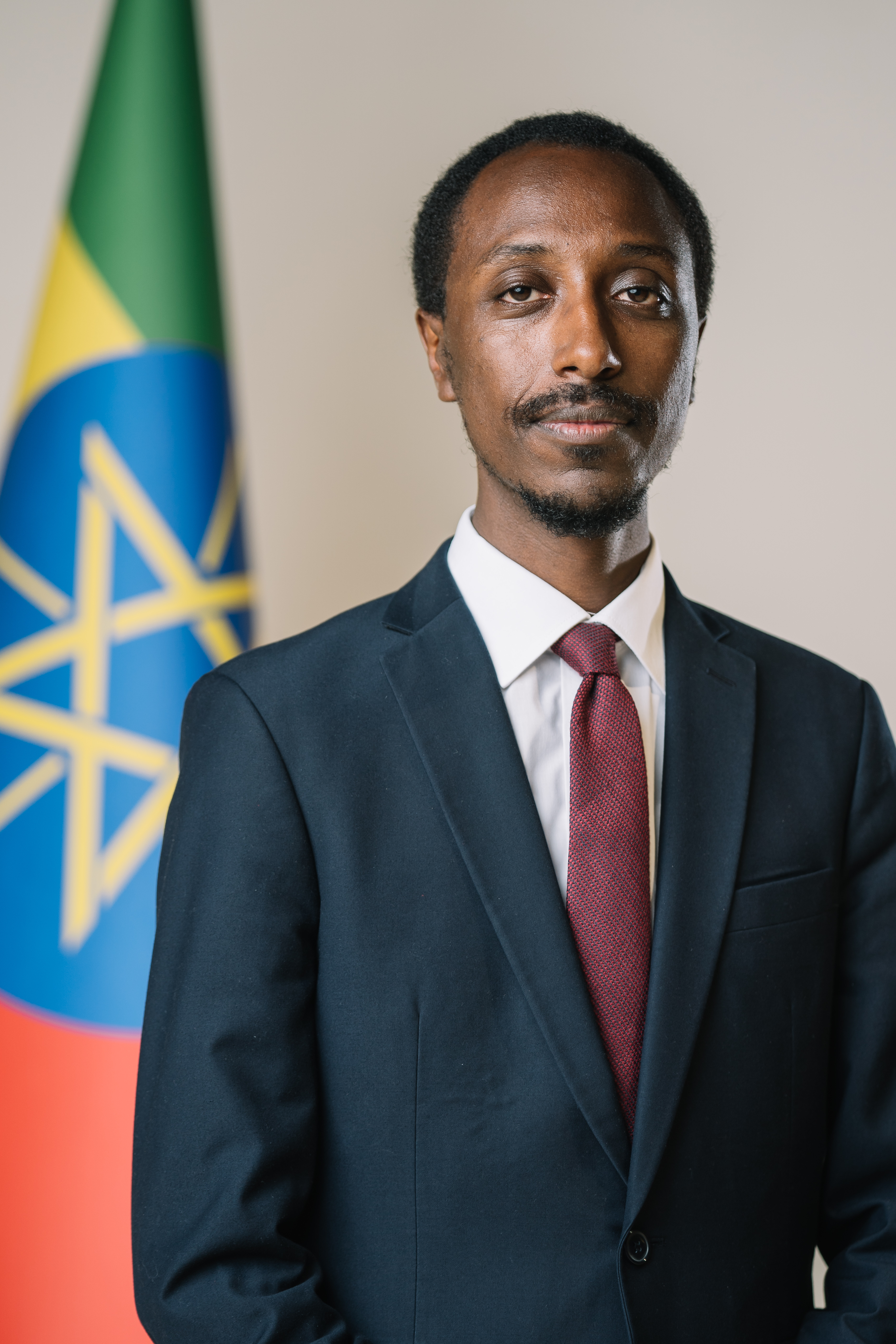

Minister of Foreign Affairs
- Incumbent
- Assumed office 18 October 2024
- Preceded by: Taye Atske Selassie

Attorney General
- Incumbent
- Assumed office 2 November 2021
- President: Sahle-Work Zewde; Taye Atske Selassie
- Prime Minister: Abiy Ahmed
- Preceded by: Adanech Abebe

Minister of Justice
- In office 6 October 2021 – 18 October 2024
- Preceded by: Adanech Abebe
- Succeeded by: Hanna Arayaselassie

Personal details
- Born: Gedion Timothewos; 1 January 1978 (age 48) Addis Ababa, Ethiopia
- Spouse: Hanna Arayaselassie
- Education: Addis Ababa University (LL.B.); Central European University (LL.M., S.J.D.)

Gedion Timothewos (Amharic: ጌድዮን ቲሞጢዎስ; 1 January 1978) is an Ethiopian politician who is serving as Minister of Foreign Affairs since 18 October 2024 and Attorney General from 2 November 2021. He has served as Minister of Justice from 6 October 2021 until Hanna Arayaselassie succeeding his position in 2024, Timothewos previously was the Ethiopian Attorney General before the position again was renamed to the Minister of Justice.

== Life ==
Born on January 1, 1978, in Addis Ababa, Gedion’s passion for law was evident from an early age. He pursued an LL.B. from Addis Ababa University. Furthering his studies at the Central European University, Gedion earned advanced degrees, including an LL.M. and an S.J.D. in Comparative Constitutional Law.

Gedion Timothewos successively held the positions of State Attorney of Ethiopia and then the Attorney General. As of 2 November 2021, he held the position of Minister of Justice. 18 October 2024, the Office of Prime Minister appointed Timothewos as Minister of Foreign Affairs, succeeding Taye Atskeselassie. This appointment was made alongside the appointment of Hanna Arayaselassie, the wife of Gedion Timothewos, as the Minister of Justice.

== Personal life ==
Gedion Timothewos is married to Hanna Arayaselassie who is Ethiopia's Minister of Justice and former Chief Commissioner of the Ethiopian Investment Commission (EIC).
