= Hanna Arayaselassie =

Ethiopian politician, academic and public servant

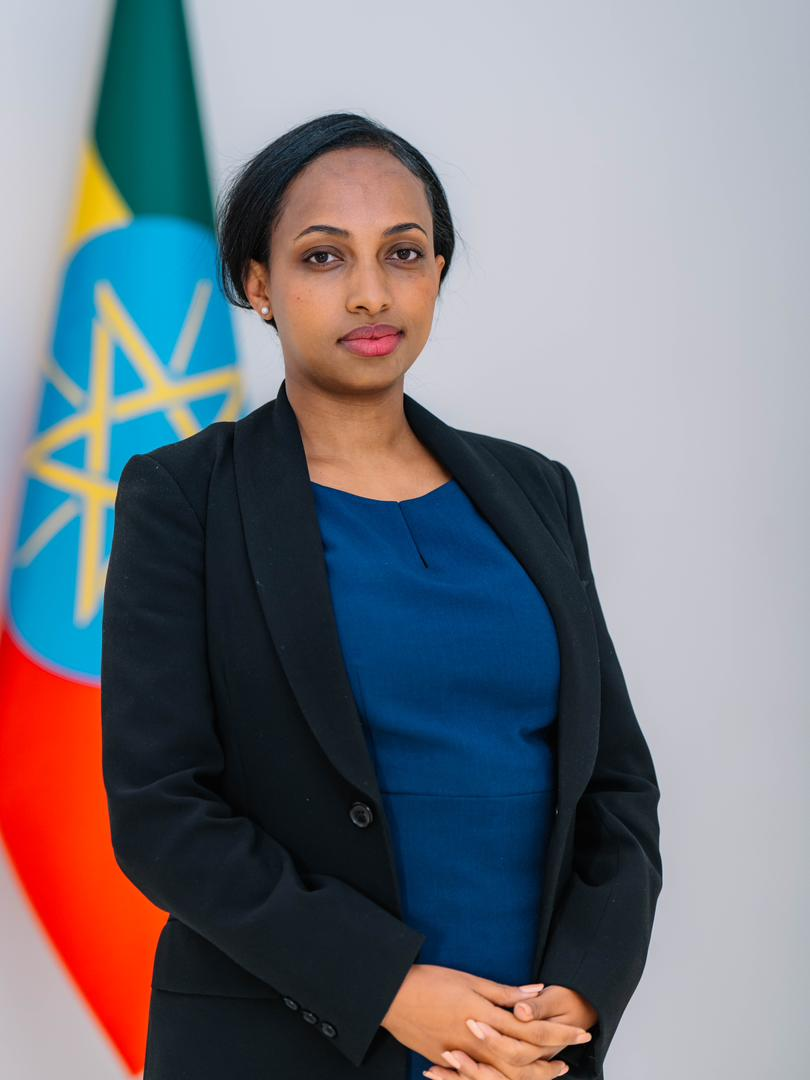

Minister of Justice
- Incumbent
- Assumed office 18 October 2024
- Prime Minister: Abiy Ahmed
- Preceded by: Gedion Timotheos

Commissioner of the Ethiopian Investment Commission
- In office 25 January 2024 – 18 October 2024
- Preceded by: Abebe Abebayehu

Deputy Commissioner of the Ethiopian Investment Commission
- In office 22 January 2023 – 25 January 2024

CEO of the Ethiopian Postal Service
- In office March 2020 – 17 January 2023
- Prime Minister: Abiy Ahmed

Personal details
- Born: 26 December 1989 (age 36) Addis Ababa, Ethiopia
- Spouse: Gedion Timotheos
- Education: Addis Ababa University
- Occupation: Politician; academic; public servant

Hanna Aryaselassie (Amharic: ሐና አርዓያሥላሴ, born 26 December 1989) is an Ethiopian politician, academic, and public servant who has served as the Minister of Justice since 2024. Hanna was appointed Deputy Commissioner of the Ethiopian Investment Commission (EIC) in 2023 and was appointed Commissioner of EIC in 2024. Previously, she was the CEO of the Ethiopian Postal Service from 2020 to 2023.

== Life and career ==
Hanna Arayaselassie was born on 26 December 1989 in Addis Ababa, Ethiopia. She graduated Addis Ababa University and pursued educational career in New York City, achieving higher academic performance. Hanna was a lecturer at Addis Ababa University School of Law. In March 2020, Hana worked as the CEO of the Ethiopian Postal Service. While at Postal Service, Hanna orchestrated significant institutional reforms, enhancing its service quality. The transformation increased its revenue and earned the prestigious Postal Excellence Award of 2023 from the Universal Postal Union for the Africa Region. On 22 January 2023, Prime Minister Abiy Ahmed appointed her as the Deputy Commissioner of the Ethiopian Investment Commission (EIC). She was elevated to new commissioner of the EIC in January 2024.

On 18 October 2024, Hanna replaced her husband Gedion Timotheos post as Minister of Justice by the Office of Prime Minister.
