= Ministry of Justice (Ethiopia) =

Government ministry of Ethiopia

Ministry of Justice of Ethiopia
- የኢትዮጵያ የፍትህ ሚኒስቴር
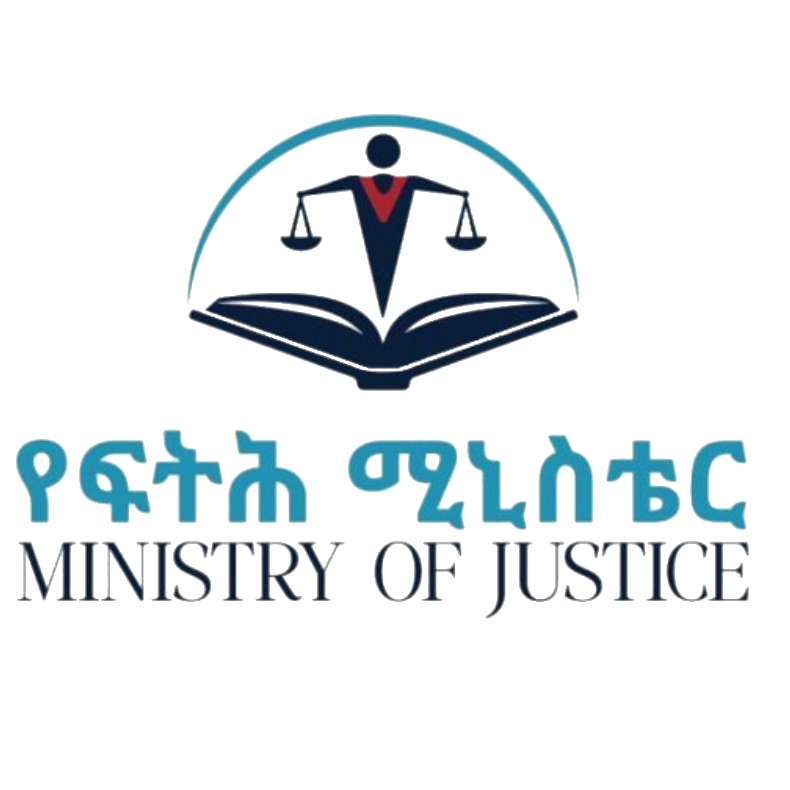

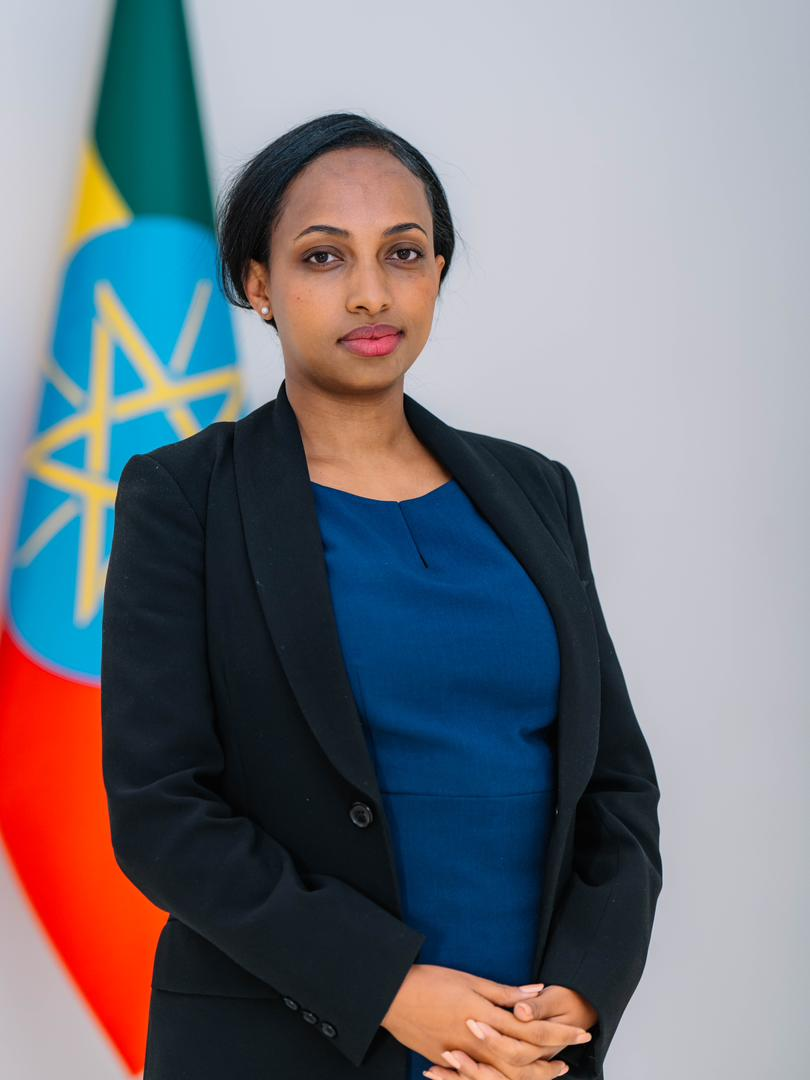
- Incumbent; Hanna Arayaselassie since 18 October 2024
- Member of: Abiy Ahmed cabinet
- Seat: Equatorial Guinea St, Addis Ababa, Ethiopia
- Appointer: Prime Minister
- Inaugural holder: 1939
- First holder: Ayele Gebre
- Salary: 198,295–230,912 birr
- Website: www.eag.gov.et/am-et/

The Ministry of Justice of Ethiopia (Amharic: የኢትዮጵያ ፍትህ ሚኒስቴር) is the government department that has the authority of federal prosecution and had possessed executive and judicial powers. The ministry was a part of the federal branch of the government, and prosecuted cases that fell within the federal jurisdiction. In 1995, the responsibility for the federal police force and prisons was transferred to the Ministry of Justice after the Ministry of Internal Affairs was abolished. In 2017, it was announced that the Ministry of Justice's affairs would be transitioned into the Federal Attorney General's Office.

== Creation and legal basis ==
According to Article 16 of Proclamation 691/2010, the Ministry of Justice had the following powers:

- Is chief advisor to the Federal Government on matters of law; Represents the Federal Government in criminal cases falling under the jurisdiction of the Federal Courts; withdraw criminal charges for good causes; follow up the execution of decisions of the courts
- Orders the conduct of investigation where it believes that a crime the adjudication of which falls under the jurisdiction of the federal courts has been committed; orders the discontinuance of an investigation or instructs further investigation on good cause; withdraw criminal charges in accordance with the law;
- Undertakes legal reform studies; carry out codification and consolidation of federal laws, collect Regional State laws and consolidate as necessary
- Assist in the preparation of draft laws when so requested by federal organs and regional states;
- Undertake or order the conduct of investigation where it believes that a crime the adjudication of which falls under the jurisdiction of the federal courts has been committed; direct and supervise the process of the investigation; allow plea bargain; upon the existence of good cause, decide on the discontinuance of an investigation or the carrying out of additional investigation;
- Studies the causes of and the methods of crime prevention; devise ways and means of crime prevention; coordinate the relevant government organs in crime prevention;
- Ensure that witnesses to a criminal case are accorded protection, as necessary;
- Assists victims of crimes or violations of human rights in civil proceedings to claim damages where such victims are unable to institute such claims in federal courts and to follow up the proceeding on their own;
- Institutes or cause the institution of suits or intervene at any stage of the proceedings of such suits before federal and regional state courts, any judicial body or arbitration tribunal where the rights and interests of the public and of the Federal Government so require;
- Registers religious organizations, nonprofit making foreign organizations and, unless specific power is given to other government organs, non-governmental organizations and associations operating in the cities of Addis Ababa and Dire Dawa or in more than one Regional State;
- Follows up, as necessary, the handling of civil suits and claims to which the federal government organs are parties; cause reports-to be submitted to it on same, and ensure that competent staff is assigned for the purpose;
- Issues, supervises and revokes licenses advocates for practicing before federal courts;
- Provides legal education through the use of various methods with a view to raising public legal consciousness in relation to the protection of human rights; cooperate with the appropriate bodies regarding legal education and training;

== History ==
In 2016, Getachew Ambaye was successively the Minister of Justice and then Attorney General under the administrative renaming of the position.

== List of ministers (post-occupation in 1942) ==
Justice Minister			Term of office		Prime Minister
#	Portrait	Name	Took office	Left office	Prime Minister
1		Ayele Gebre	1939	1942	Betwoded Wolde Tzaddick
2		Aie-Masfin Andargatchew Massai	1943	1948	Betwoded Wolde Tzaddick
3		Wolde Giyorgis Wolde Yohannes	1949	1955	Ras Betwoded Makonnen Endelkachew
4		Abiye Abebe	1958	1961	Ras Abebe Aregai
5		Dejazmatch Zewdie Gebre-Salassie	1961	1963	Tsehafi Taezaz Aklilu Habte-Wold
6		Mammo Tadesse	1966	1967	Tsehafi Taezaz Aklilu Habte-Wold
7		Akale Worq Habte Wold	1969	1974	Tsehafi Taezaz Aklilu Habte-Wold
8		Belachew Asrat	1975	1975	Post Abolished (12 September 1974–10 September 1987) by the Derg
9		Amanuel Amde-Mikael	1975	1978	Post Abolished (12 September 1974–10 September 1987) by the Derg
10		Zegeye Asfaw	1978	1979	Post Abolished (12 September 1974–10 September 1987) by the Derg
11		Zegeye Asfaw	1980	1980	Post Abolished (12 September 1974–10 September 1987) by the Derg
12		Getachew Kibret	1980	1983	Post Abolished (12 September 1974–10 September 1987) by the Derg
13		Emanuel Amde Michael	1984	1986	Post Abolished (12 September 1974–10 September 1987) by the Derg
14		Wondayen Mehretu	1986	1991	Fikre Selassie Wogderess
15		Shiferaw Wolde-Michael	1991	1992	Tamrat Layne
16		Mehitma Solomon	1992	1998	Meles Zenawi
17		Wolde Werede	1998	2001	Meles Zenawi
18		Harka Haroyu	2001	2005	Meles Zenawi
19 Assefa Kessito 2005 to 2008		20 Berhan Hailu	2008	3 June 2013	Meles Zenawi
21		Getachew Ambaye	4 June 2013	11 May 2016	Hailemariam Desalegn
22		Ato Birhanu Tsegaye (Attorney General)	October 2018	March 2020	Abiy Ahmed
23		Adanech Abebe (Attorney General)	12 March 2020	18 August 2020	Abiy Ahmed
24		Gedion Timotheos	6 October 2021	18 October 2024	Abiy Ahmed
24		Hanna Arayaselassie	18 October 2024	Incumbent	Abiy Ahmed

== See also ==
- Justice ministry
- Politics of Ethiopia
