= Marchuwa =

Currency used by Kingdom of Wolaita

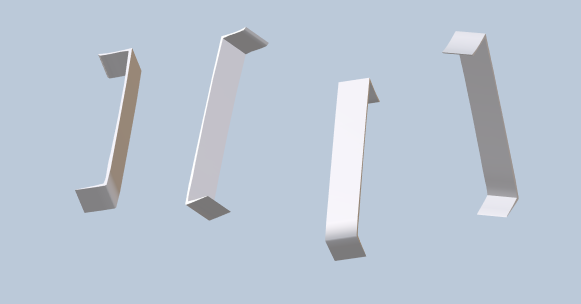
- Marchuwa, a model.

Units of account
- Symbol: Marchuwa (Latin Script) ማርጯ (Ge'ez)

Demographics
- User(s): Kingdom of Wolaita, Hadiya, Kambatta, Sidama, Dawuro, Gamo, and Gofa

Issuance
- Central bank: Kingdom of Wolaita

Valuation
- Value: 0.50 USD
- This infobox shows the latest status before this currency was rendered obsolete.

Marchuwa (Geʽez: ማርጯ, Wolaytta: Marccuwa) was a currency used by the Kingdom of Wolaita. Marchuwa was a bundle of thin metal strips one cubit long, used as trading currency. Marchuwa was equal to 18 Maria Theresa Thalers or 0.50 US dollars.

== History ==
As Chauncey Hugh Stigand states, the Welayta people had developed the art of weaving and wearing cloths made up of cotton prior to any other Ethiopian communities. The importance of cotton to the Welayta was more than clothing. Shalluwa, a kind of thread spun by women, and cotton products like Karretta Sinna, a black colored thread made of cotton, were used as a currency. When different parts of Africa used the barter system (exchanging of goods), the state of Wolaita spread this form of currency throughout its region. As Remo Chiatti highlighted in 1903, one Marchuwa was equal to 18 Maria Theresa Thalers or 0.50 USA dollars.

Oral tradition claim that there was the storehouse of Marchuwa at Dalbo palace established by one of the kings of the Wolaita Tigre dynasty. Thus, the state of Wolaita had developed the banking system prior to other states of Ethiopia. Sources proved that until the Menelik II's conquest of the south Hadiya, Kambatta, Sidama, Dawuro, Gamo, and Gofa had used this Marchuwa as currency.

By the time Welayta people were incorporated into the Ethiopian Empire by Menelik II, Marchuwa was replaced by the Maria Theresa thaler and blocks of salt called "Amole tchew", which are assumed to be the first currency of the Ethiopia.

== See also ==
- List of rulers of Welayta
- Kingdom of Wolaita
