= Adanech Abebe =

Ethiopian politician; Mayor of Addis Ababa since 2021

- አዳነች አቤቤ
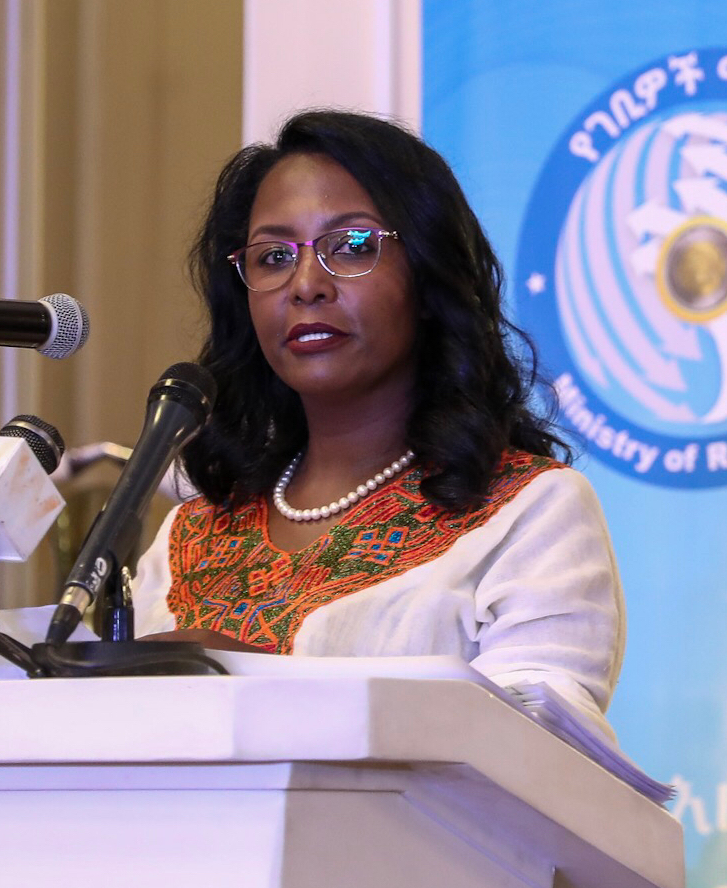
- Adanech in 2019

32nd Mayor of Addis Ababa
- Incumbent
- Assumed office 28 September 2021
- President: Sahle-Work Zewde; Taye Atske Selassie
- Prime Minister: Abiy Ahmed
- Deputy: Jantirar Abay
- Preceded by: Takele Uma Benti

Deputy Mayor of Addis Ababa
- In office 18 August 2020 – 28 September 2021
- President: Sahle-Work Zewde
- Prime Minister: Abiy Ahmed
- Preceded by: Takele Uma Banti
- Succeeded by: Jantirar Abay

Attorney General
- In office 12 March 2020 – 18 August 2020
- Preceded by: Berhanu Tsegaye
- Succeeded by: Gedion Timothewos

Minister of Revenue and Customs Authority
- In office 20 October 2018 – 12 March 2020
- Preceded by: Beker Shale
- Succeeded by: Lake Ayalew

Personal details
- Born: Arsi Province, Ethiopia
- Party: Prosperity Party
- Children: 2
- Education: Ethiopian Civil Service University; Greenwich University

Adanech Abiebie (Amharic: አዳነች አቤቤ, Oromo: Adaanach Abeebee) is an Ethiopian politician who is serving as the thirty-second mayor of Addis Ababa since 2021. She served as deputy mayor from 2020 until 2021. She previously was the Minister of Revenue and Customs Authority from 2018 to 2020, when she became the first female to assume the role of the Federal Attorney General of Ethiopia. She is the first woman to hold the mayorship since it was created in 1910.

== Early life ==
Born in Arsi Province, Adanech has little familial disclosure, according to her education background documents. But it was widely known Abebe Deso is her father. She is the only daughter of six children. Abebe's prominence in the province led to establishing Ireecha Primary School in 1977, where Adanech was received as the first female student. Adanech independently taught herself for the sake of her father based on child marriage. Inspired by her deeds, Abebe progressively admitted the violence against women and criticized parents who did not want to allow their female children to attend school. Initially, five girls enrolled the school, but only Adanech passed the 6th Grade National Exam (Ministry Exam).

== Education ==
Adanech completed undergraduate studies at Law in the Ethiopian Civil Service University in 2001, and attended a graduate program in leadership from Greenwich University in the United Kingdom.

== Political career ==
Adanech's early career was as an elementary school teacher before becoming the administrative director of the school. Her capability for leadership at both federal and regional levels led her to enter politics.

In 2001, Adanech served as attorney of the Oromia Justice Bureau. In the 2005 general election, she won a seat in the House of Peoples' Representatives Aseko constituency. Then, she took a director position at the Oromia Development Association (ODA), where she served for five years. During the position, Adanech reformed the status of the association and becomes the mayor of Adama. She was the first female in the position and embarked on significant changes during her administration, including the reduction of corruption within the city.

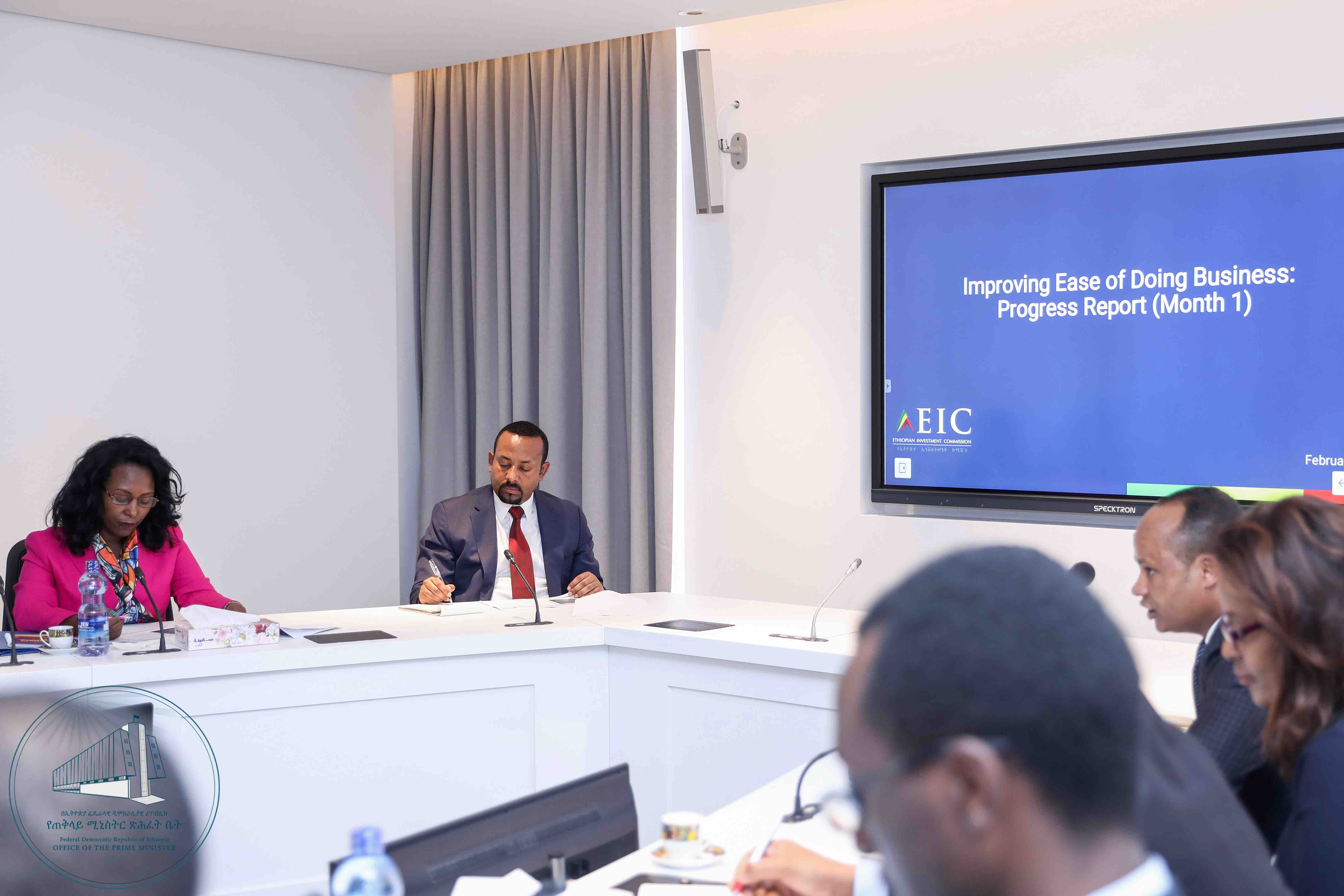
Adanech with other cabinet ministers meeting at Office of Prime Minister in 2019

She served as minister of the Revenue and Customs Authority from 2018 to 2020, reinstating corruption and bribery investigations. After serving two years, she was appointed to Federal Attorney General of Ethiopia under the premiership of Abiy Ahmed on 12 March 2020. On 18 August 2020, she was appointed as Deputy Mayor of Addis Ababa, with 138 voices. Adanech included two individuals from her cabinet. In September 2021, Adanech was elected mayor of the city.

=== Mayor of Addis Ababa ===
Adanech is the first woman in the mayor position of Addis Ababa since 1910. Adanech was known for corruption fighting by undertaking significant reforms in Ethiopia, and involved in mobilizing resource to support the government against the rebel TPLF amidst the Tigray War. In November 2021, Adanech visited injured ENDF soldiers at Armed Forces Comprehensive Specialized Hospital in Bishoftu. She donated 15 million birr of medical equipment and other clothes to the military in the course of "law enforcement operation". In October 2021, Adanech visited a cluster wheat farm in Hitosa District in Arsi along with other government officials. At the event, she highlighted to ensure food security and witnessing 680 hectares of land covered with food crop in the current harvest season. Adanech also expressed anti-American stance on the intervention of the war; during March 2021 pro-government rally, she supported the government by underlying "America and its associates, without understanding the ways of the TPLF forces ways and disastrous acts, they are interfering in our domestic affairs by imposing travel sanctions and prerequisites which can by no means be accepted".

== Personal life ==
Although Adanech never shared her personal life via public media, she revealed her husband Teshome Abebe on a Seifu on EBS talk show episode. Adanech also told she has two children, a boy, and a girl.

== See also ==
- Council of Ministers of Abiy Ahmed
