= Ogato Sana =

King of Wolaita from 1759 to 1799

- King

King of the Kingdom of Wolaita
- Reign: 1759-1799
- Predecessor: Sana Tube
- Successor: Amado Ogato
Names
- Kawo Ogato Sana
Regnal name
- King Ogato
- Dynasty: Wolaita Malla Dynasty
- Father: Sana

Ogato Sana, also known as Kawo Sana Ogato in the Wolaitta language, was one of the most renowned kings of the Tigre dynasty along with the Kingdom of Wolaita. King Ogato had acquired all of the regions, not only by battle, but also through deception and the employment of spys among the Gamo, Gofa, Kucha, and Kambata tribes. During his reign, the pre-colonial Wolaita kingdom's agricultural modernization effort included expanding acreage, installing irrigation canals, and improving cattle breeds in order to implement modern dairy farming. King Ogato Sana was 10th rulers of the Wolaita kingdom under the Tigre dynasty. King Ogato had erected his palace at top of the Damot hills, driven the Hadiya people out of the present-day Humbo and Abaya in the north, and captured other provinces. To protect himself from intruders, he erected a fortification around his castle on Damot hill, as well as a defense trench surrounding Sore Mashedo.
