= Endrias Geta =

Ethiopian politician

- Geeta Inddiraasa
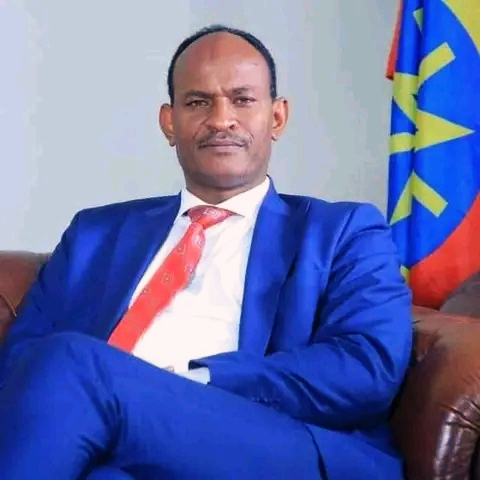
- Endrias Geta 2021

Assistant Professor at Haramaya University
- In office March 2012 – May 2014

Dean of Wolaita Sodo Agricultural College
- In office May 2014 – October 2016

Director General of the SNNPR Agricultural Research Institute
- In office December 2018 – November 2021

Chief Adiminstrator of Wolayita Zone
- In office 28 August 2020 – 9 October 2021
- Preceded by: Dagato Kumbe
- Succeeded by: Akililu Lemma

State Minister of Ministry of Irrigation and Lowlands
- Incumbent
- Assumed office October 9, 2021

Personal details
- Education: Haramaya University

Endrias Geta Baldada is an Ethiopian politician serving as State Minister of Ministry of Irrigation and Lowlands. Endrias is from the Wolaita people and he served as chief administrator of Wolayita Zone after SNNPR Prosperity Party ousted Dagato Kumbe from his position in August 2020.

== Career ==
Endrias has served as the Director General of the SNNPR Agricultural Research Institute. Prior to his transfer to the regional institute, Endrias served as Dean of Wolaita Sodo Agricultural College and Director of the Areka Agricultural Research Center. He was also chief administrator of Wolayita Zone for a year from August 2020. From 2021 to present Endrias is serving as State Minister of FDRE Ministry of Irrigation and Lowland Areas.
