= List of rulers of Welayta =

Historically, the Kingdom of Wolaita was ruled by more than fifty kings.q The rulers used the title Kawo. Legendarily, ~1251 is the year of Welayta's founding. (In traditional oral sources, where the state of Wolayta also existed during the Aksumite empire, or even earlier, with more than 42 dynasties. The Mala and Tigre dynasty are the most recent ones).

The exact number of kings in each dynasty varies depending on the source.

The following were the rulers of the Wolayta kingdom and province in present-day southern Ethiopia.

Rulers of Welayta until 1900
Tenure	Incumbent	Notes
First Wolaita Malla dynasty
Unknown Dates	Bito	
Unknown Dates	Bidinto	
Unknown Dates	Hanise	
Unknown Dates	Hadiyo	
Unknown Dates	Yate	
Unknown Dates	Worde	
Unknown Dates	Wode	
Unknown Dates	Sagada	
Unknown Dates	Bure	
Unknown Dates	Haruro	
Unknown Dates	Halala	
Arujia dynasty These kings are portrayed in oral tradition as harsh, rude and killers. Some sources state 12 kings made up this dynasty.
Unknown Dates	Bada'a	
Unknown Dates	Badila	
Unknown Dates	Gadila	
Unknown Dates	Godira	
Unknown Dates	Bayuwa	
Unknown Dates	Burana	
Unknown Dates	Bade	
Unknown Dates	Gonga	
Unknown Dates	Dangula I	
Unknown Dates	Dangula II	Last king defeated in battle by the Malla dynasty.
Second Wolaita Malla dynasty (restored); Some sources state that 15 kings ruled in this dynasty.
Unknown Dates	Sana or Sene	
Unknown Dates	Sabora	
Unknown Dates	Sagula	
Unknown Dates	Samora	
Unknown Dates	Sassa or Saso	
Unknown Dates	Saamm	
Unknown Dates	Sata	
13th century	Motolam or Motolomi	Son of Saso. (Likely legendary)
Unknown Dates	Mota	
Unknown Dates	Ocha	
Unknown Dates	Lacha or Leche	Dynasty ended with the Oromo migrations
Tigre dynasty
c. 1560	Mikael or Shume, Kawo	
16th century	Girma Ketema, Kawo	
17th century	Gazenja, Kawa (Gazenya)	
17th century	Addaye Gazayna, Kawa	
18th century	Kote Adaye, Kawo	
18th century	Libana Kote, Kawo	
1707 to 1748	Sana Tube, Kawo	
? to 1761	Tube Libana, Kawo	Died in office
1761 to 1800	Ogato Sana, Kawo	
1800 to 1835	Amado Ogato, Kawo	
1835 to 1845	Damote Amado, Kawo	
1845 to 1886	Gobe Damote, Kawo	
1886 to c.1890	Gaga Gobe, Kawo	
1890 to 1896	Tona Gaga, Kawo	Warlike, the last and greatest king.
Waylata conquered by Menelik II and incorporated into Ethiopia 1894
October 1894 to 1900	Tekle Haymanot, Negus	

== Bibliography ==
- Beckingham, C.F.; Huntingford, G.W.B. (1954). Some Records of Ethiopia, 1593–1646. London: Hakluyt Society.

== See also ==
- Monarchies of Ethiopia
- Rulers and heads of state of Ethiopia
