= Sodo Zuria =

District in South Ethiopia Regional State, Ethiopia

Coordinates: 6°50′N 37°45′E

Sodo Zuriya: Sooddo Yuushuwa Allaanaa (Wolaytta); ሶዶ ዙሪያ ወረዳ (Amharic)
- Woreda
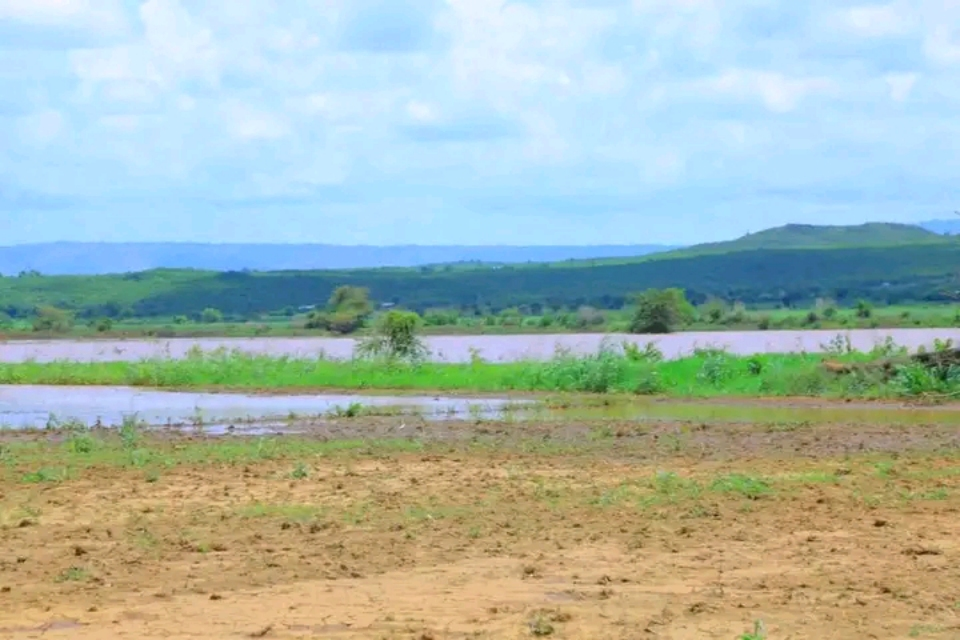
- Sodo Yushuwa swamp area
- Interactive map of Sodo Zuriya
- Country: Ethiopia
- Region: South Ethiopia Regional State
- Zone: Wolaita
- Seat: Sodo

Government
  - Chief Administrator: Hailesilas Biramo (Prosperity Party)

Population (2019)
  - Total: 200,911
  - Male: 98,824
  - Female: 102,087
- Time zone: UTC+3 (EAT)

Sodo Zuria (Amharic "Greater Sodo Area") is one of the woredas in the South Ethiopia Regional State of Ethiopia. Part of the Wolayita Zone, Sodo Zuria is bordered on the southwest by Offa, on the west by Kindo Koysha, on the northwest by Damot Sore, on the north by Boloso Sore, on the northeast by Damot Gale, on the east by Damot Weyde, on the west by Bayra Koysha and on the southeast by Humbo. Sodo City is the administrative center for Sodo Zuria Woreda.

According to a 2004 report, Sodo Zuria had 22 kilometers of asphalt roads, 104 kilometers of all-weather roads and 48 kilometers of dry-weather roads, for an average road density of 380 kilometers per 1000 square kilometers. In 2006 the Woreda Agriculture and Rural Development Office announced that they had begun development projects that included the creation or maintenance of 105 kilometers of road in 34 kebeles of Sodo Zuria woreda. This would cost 2.5 million Birr.

== History ==
Sodo Zuria was selected by the Ministry of Agriculture and Rural Development in 2004 as one of several woredas for voluntary resettlement for farmers from overpopulated areas, becoming the new home for a total of 1268 heads of households and 5072 total family members.

The World Bank approved funding in November 2007 for a project sponsored by World Vision Ethiopia to restore forest to 1,000 to 2,000 hectares in Soddo Zuria and 3,000 to 4,000 hectares in Humbo using native species, a program which would be funded with funds from carbon offset purchases.

== Demographics ==
Based on the 2019 population projection conducted by the CSA, this woreda has a total population of 200,911, of whom 98,824 are men and 102,087 women. The majority of the inhabitants were Protestants, with 66.67% of the population reporting that belief, 26.83% practiced Ethiopian Orthodox Christianity, and 5.28% were Catholic.

The 1994 national census reported a total population for this woreda of 200,866 of whom 99,979 were men and 100,887 were women; 36,287 or 18.07% of its population were urban dwellers. The five largest ethnic groups reported in Sodo Zuria were the Welayta (92.81%), the Amhara (2.6%), the Gamo (0.85%), the Dorze (0.77%), and the Silt'e (0.76%); all other ethnic groups made up 2.21% of the population. Welayta is spoken as a first language by 93.14%, 4.17% Amharic, 0.65% Gamo, and 0.58% speak Dorze; the remaining 1.46% spoke all other primary languages reported. The majority of the inhabitants practiced Ethiopian Orthodox Christianity, with 52.03% of the population reporting they held that belief, while 43.06% were Protestants, 2.4% were Roman Catholic, and 1.61% were Muslim.
