= Harka Haroyu =

Ethiopian politician

Minister of Justice
- In office 2001–2008
- Prime Minister: Meles Zenawi
- Preceded by: Wolde Werede
- Succeeded by: Berhan Hailu

Personal details
- Born: 1959 (age 66–67) Hagereselam, Tigray Province, Ethiopian Empire

Harka Haroyu (born 1959) is an Ethiopian politician who was the Minister of Justice of Ethiopia from 2001 to 2008.

Born in Hagereselam, Haroyu was a member of Parliament for the Hagere-Selam constituency. He lost the seat on 15 May 2005 and won the seat again after a later election.
