= Koysha Seta =

Ethiopian singer (1971–2018)

- Seeta Koysha (Wolaytta)
- Born: 3 July 1971; Damot Gale, Shewa Province, Ethiopian Empire (now Wolaita Zone, Southern Nations, Nationalities, and People's Region, Ethiopia)
- Died: 14 May 2018 (aged 46); Addis Ababa, Ethiopia
- Notable work: Bali Helele

Koysha Seta Debena (3 July 1971 – 14 May 2018) was an Ethiopian singer, known for his 1985 album Bali Helele. In the mid-1980s, he was involved in promoting Welayta people traditional music.

== Career ==
In 1984, the music on cassette that was made public by the Ethio Music House introduced the music and culture of the people of Wolayita. Koysha was a master of its cultural music. His most well-known song was "AYE Esis abo, Haya wola lomite". Koysha was the first musician from Wolaita to release an album. Koysha was known not only for his music but also for his dances on the stage, which he dances in times of sorrow and joy.

He was trying to release an album of new music and promote his work to the public before his death.

== Discography ==
=== Albums ===
- Bali Helele (1985)
