= Getachew Ambaye =

Ethiopian politician

- ጌታቸው አምባዬ

Attorney General
- In office 17 May 2016 – 23 April 2018
- President: Mulatu Teshome
- Prime Minister: Abiy Ahmed
- Preceded by: post established
- Succeeded by: Berhanu Tsegaye

Minister of Justice
- In office 4 June 2013 – 11 May 2016
- President: Girma Wolde-Giorgis; Mulatu Teshome
- Prime Minister: Hailemariam Desalegn
- Preceded by: Berhan Hailu
- Succeeded by: Birhanu Tsegaye

Getachew Ambaye (Amharic: ጌታቸው አምባዬ) is an Ethiopian politician who had served with various major governmental positions, notably, the Minister of Justice (2013–2016) and attorney general (2016–2018).

== Career ==
Getachew Ambaye has been deputy mayor of Addis Ababa. On 4 June 2013, Getachew was appointed by Prime Minister Hailemariam Desalegn as minister of justice, succeeding Berhan Hailu. On 17 May 2016, he was appointed by the Ethiopian parliament as the first attorney general.

On 23 April 2018, he was replaced by Berhanu Tsegaye amidst Prime Minister Abiy Ahmed new cabinet.
