= Attorney General of Ethiopia =

National prosecutor of the Ethiopian government

- Amharic: የኢትዮጵያ ጠቅላይ ዐቃቢ ህግ

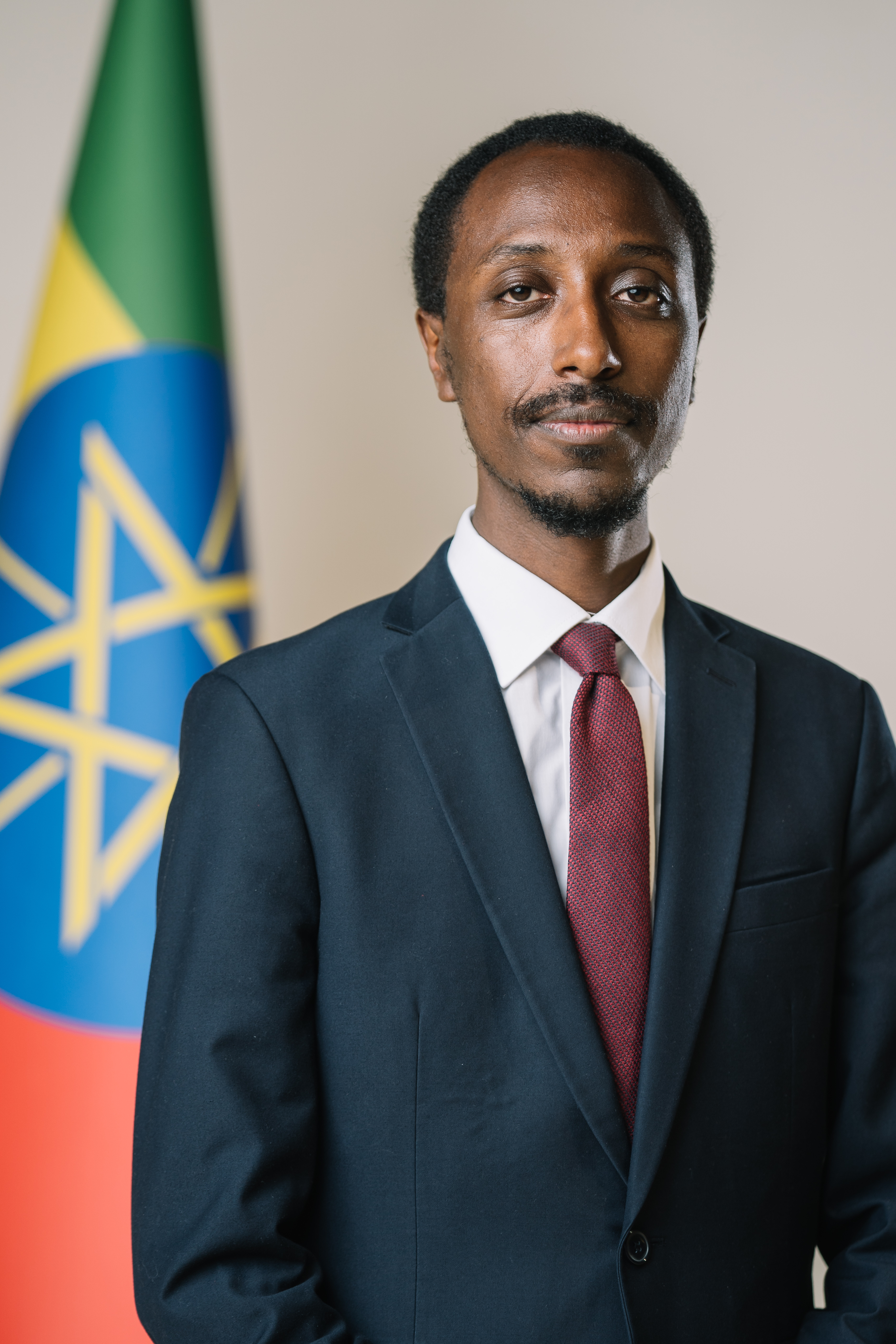
- Incumbent; Gedion Timotheos since 2 November 2021
- Residence: Jomo Kenyatta St, Addis Ababa, Ethiopia
- Appointer: House of Peoples' Representatives
- Formation: 2016
- Website: www.eag.gov.et/am-et/

The Attorney General of Ethiopia (Amharic: የኢትዮጵያ ጠቅላይ ዐቃቢ ህግ) is a law official that ensures law and prosecutes criminal investigation under Council of Ministers Proclamation No.943/2016. It was established in 2016 with Getachew Ambaye serving as the first attorney general from 2016 to 2018. The Attorney General is appointed by the House of Peoples' Representatives (HPR) and the deputy Attorney General is appointed by the Prime Minister.

The current Attorney General is Gedeon Timotheos since 2 November 2021.

== Overview ==
The Attorney General position was created in 2015 when the Ministry of Justice transformed into the Federal Attorney General Office regulated by the Council of Ministers' Proclamation No.260/2012. Under cited Federal Attorney General Proclamation No.943/2016, Attorney General is the head of Federal Attorney General appointed by the House of Peoples' Representatives (HPR) and the deputy Attorney General is appointed by the Prime Minister. The Federal Attorney General is located in Addis Ababa and empowered to ensure law and order by investigating criminal investigations. Under the legal framework, the office of Attorney General is fully political appointee and superficial part of cabinet fully responsible for the head of the government. The office performs two major functions; giving legal advice to the government and prosecuting crimes. The Ethiopian constitution does not mention the Attorney General is fully independent, instead it is accountable for political institution.

The first Attorney General was Getachew Ambaye, who previously served as the minister of Justice and the predecessor administrative of the Attorney General in 2016 until 2018. Former EPRDF veteran Berhanu Tsegaye had served as the second Attorney General until 2020. He was succeeded by Adanech Abebe, who served as acting attorney general from 12 March to 18 August. The current attorney general is Gedeon Timotheos since 2 November 2021. He was a priest of the Ethiopian Orthodox Tewahedo Church.

== List of officers ==
- Getachew Ambaye (17 May 2016 – 16 October 2018)
- Berhanu Tsegaye (23 April 2018 – 11 March 2020)
- Adanech Abebe (12 March 2020 – 18 August 2020) (acting)
- Gedeon Timotheos (2 November 2021 – present)
