= Wollo University =

Public university in Wollo, Amhara Region, Ethiopia

- ወሎ ዩნიቨርሲቲ
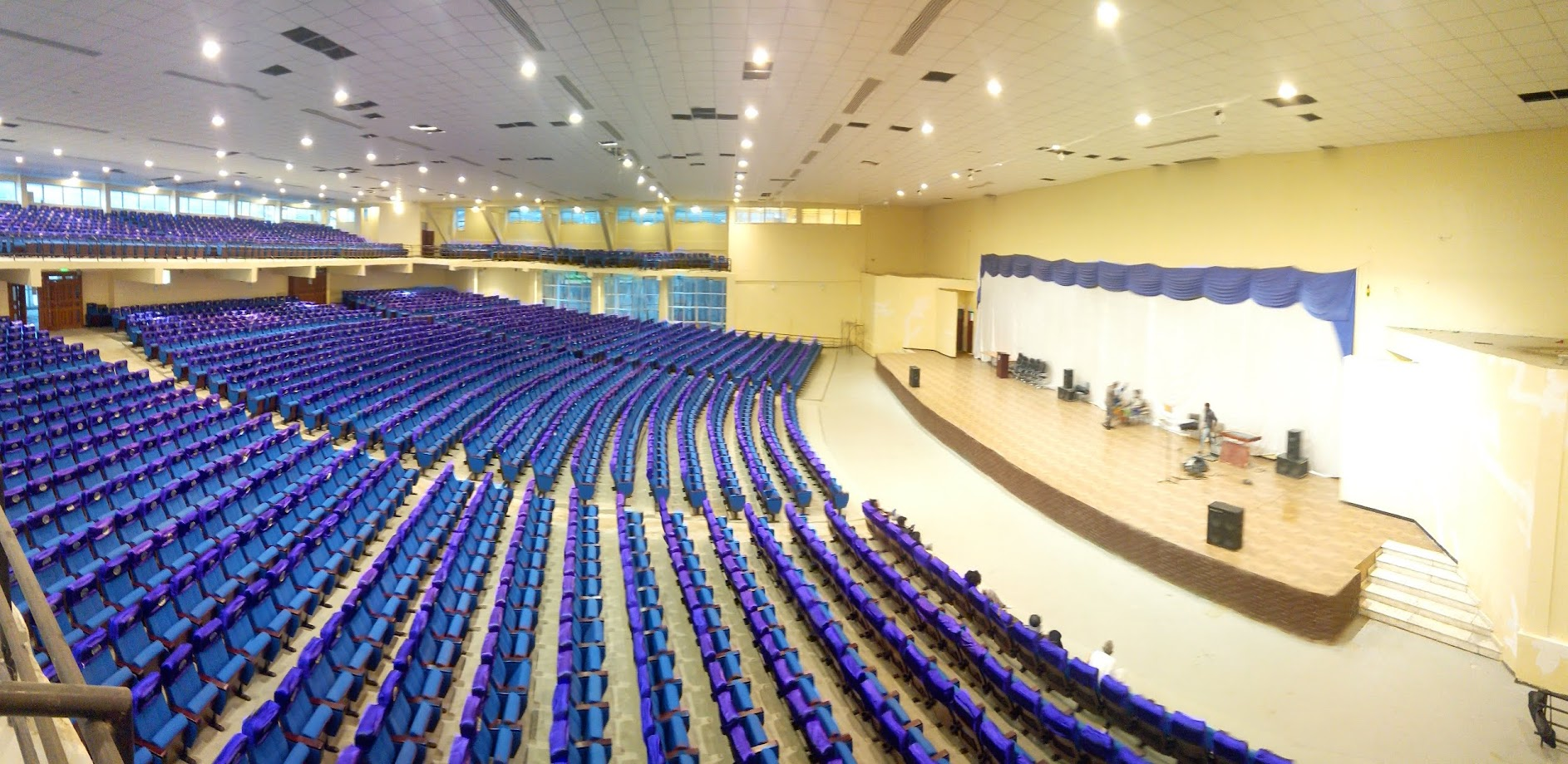
- Motto: Knowledge for Sustainable Development
- Type: Public
- Established: 2007
- President: Dr. Awol Seid
- Academic staff: 1,200+
- Administrative staff: 2,000+
- Students: 25,000+
- Location: Dessie, Amhara Region, Ethiopia; 11.1830°N 39.6330°E
- Campus: Urban
- Website: wu.edu.et
- Location in Ethiopia

Wollo University (Amharic: ወሎ ዩኒቨርሲቲ) is a public university located in the cities of Dessie and Kombolcha, within Ethiopia's Amhara Region and established in 2007

== History ==
Wollo University was established in 2007.

== Campuses ==
Wollo University operates two primary campuses:

- Dessie Campus: Located in the city of Dessie, this campus hosts colleges such as Agriculture, Business and Economics, Medicine and Health Sciences, Natural Sciences, and Education.
- Kombolcha Campus: Based in Kombolcha, this campus includes the College of Engineering and Technology, the College of Informatics, and the School of Textile and Fashion Design.

== Academics ==
Wollo University offers a broad spectrum of undergraduate and postgraduate programs. Its academic structure comprises the following colleges and schools:

- College of Agriculture
- College of Business and Economics
- College of Engineering and Technology
- College of Informatics
- College of Medicine and Health Sciences
- College of Natural Sciences
- College of Social Sciences and Humanities
- School of Law
- School of Textile and Fashion Design
- Institute of Teacher Education and Behavioral Sciences

As of 2025, the university offers over 50 undergraduate and 20 postgraduate degree programs.

== Research and community engagement ==
The university is engaged in applied research focused on addressing regional and national development challenges. Its research priorities span agriculture, health sciences, engineering, education, and the social sciences. Wollo University also provides community services such as healthcare outreach, agricultural extension, and civic education.

== Administration ==
The president of Wollo University is Awol Seid, appointed in 2024 by Ethiopia’s Minister of Education, Berhanu Nega.

== Partnerships and collaborations ==
Wollo University maintains partnerships with local and international institutions. These collaborations support research, knowledge exchange, capacity building, and staff and student mobility.

== See also ==
- List of universities and colleges in Ethiopia
- Education in Ethiopia
