= Lasho =

Town in Wolaita, Ethiopia

Lasho: Laashsho Ambbaa (Wolaytta); ላሾ (Amharic)
- Town
- Location within Wolayita Lasho within Ethiopia
- Coordinates: 6°47′N 37°28′E
- Country: Ethiopia
- Region: South Ethiopia Regional State
- Zone: Wolaita
- Woreda: Kawo Koysha
- Time zone: UTC+3 (EAT)

Lasho (Geʽez: ላሾ, Wolayttattuwa: Laashsho) is a town in Wolayita Zone of the South Ethiopia Regional State, Ethiopia. The approximate distance from Wolaita Sodo to Lasho is about 79 kilometres (49 mi) to Northwest via B52. And also the distance from Addis Ababa to Lasho is 388 km (241 mi) via Butajira-Worabe-Wolaita Sodo to Southwest. Lasho town is used as an administrative capital of Kawo Koysha district of Wolaita Zone. It is located at an elevation of 2,130 metres (6,990 ft) above sea level. Lasho is a populated place in South Ethiopia Regional State. The amenities in the town are 24 hours electric light, pure water service, kindergarten, primary and high schools, health center, everyday public market and others. Lasho lies between about 6°47'02" North 37°28'22" East
