= Damot Sore =

District in South Ethiopia Regional State

Damot Sore: Daamoota Soore Allaanaa (Wolaytta); ዳሞት ሶሬ ወረዳ (Amharic)
- Woreda
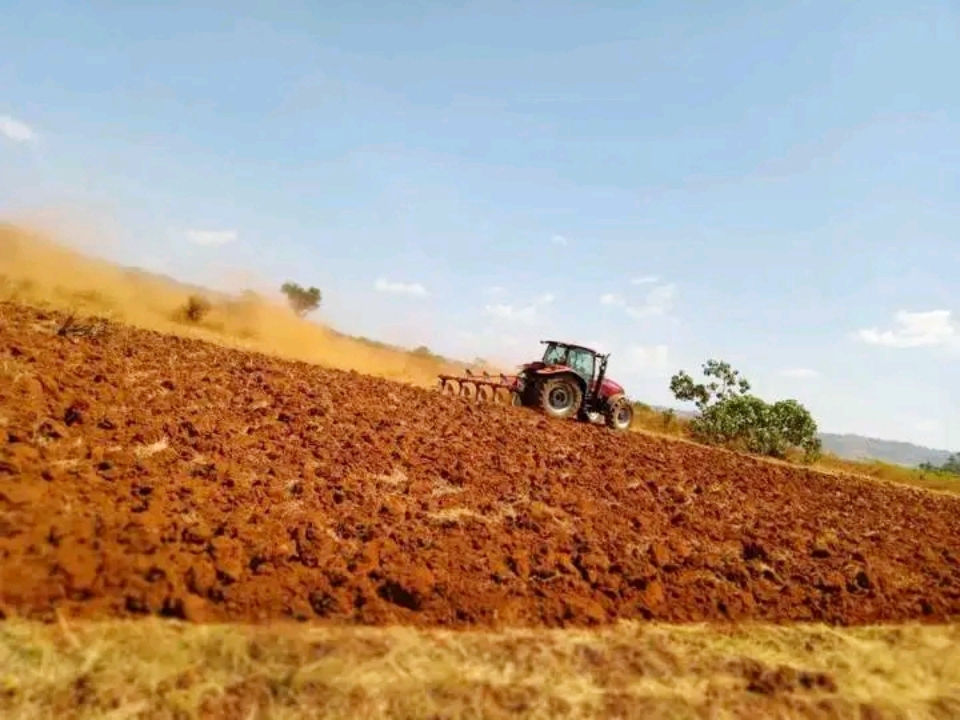
- Damota Sore wide farmland
- Interactive map of Damot Sore
- Country: Ethiopia
- Region: South Ethiopia Regional State
- Zone: Wolaita
- Seat: Gununo

Population (2019)
  - Total: 131,078
  - Male: 63,845
  - Female: 67,233
- Time zone: UTC+3 (EAT)

Damot Sore is a woreda in South Ethiopia Regional State of Ethiopia. Part of the Wolayita Zone Damot Sore is bordered on the southeast by Sodo Zuria, on the west by Kindo Koysha, on the northwest by Boloso Bombe, and on the north by Boloso Sore. The administrative town of the wereda is Gununo. Damot Sore was separated from Boloso Sore woreda.

== Demographics ==
Based on the 2019 population projection conducted by the CSA, this woreda has a total population of 131,078, of whom 63,845 are men and 67,233 women; 6,124 or 6.08% of its population are urban dwellers. The majority of the inhabitants were Protestants, with 62.47% of the population reporting that belief, 31.15% practiced Ethiopian Orthodox Christianity, and 5.47% were Catholic.
