= Ethiopian Shipping Lines =

Djibouti-based Ethiopian shipping company

Ethiopian Shipping Logistics

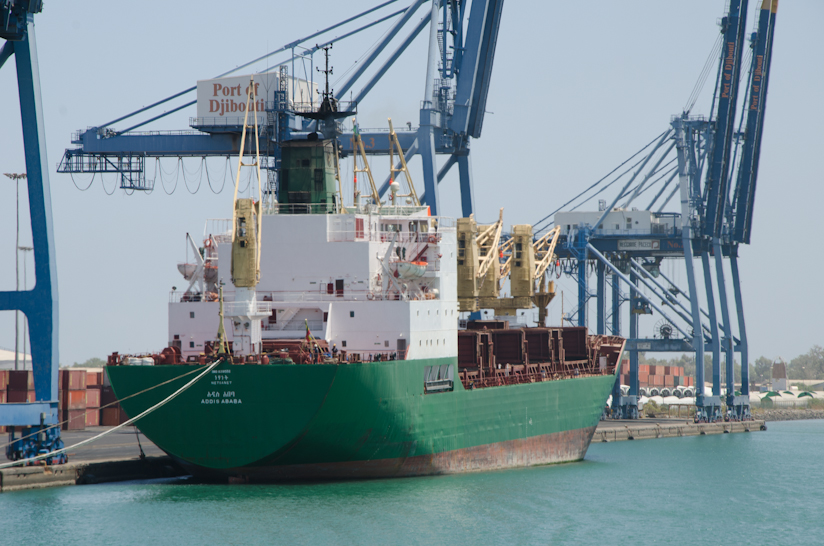
- ESL cargo ship at Port of Djibouti
- Type: Subsidiary
- Industry: Transport
- Founded: 21 March 1964; 62 years ago
- Headquarters: Addis Ababa; Port of Djibouti,
- Area served: Red Sea, Mediterranean, Far East, the Gulf states and Indian subcontinent
- Key people: Roba Megersa (CEO); Mekonen Abera (General Manager)
- Services: Sea freight Cross trade Port and terminal services Warehousing; Container terminal services Multimodal transport Stevedore and shore-handling Human resources development and training
- Revenue: 57 billion birr (2024)
- Operating income: 46.8 billion birr (2024)
- Owner: Ethiopian Investment Holdings
- Website: www.eslse.et

The Ethiopian Shipping and Logistics Services Enterprise (ESLSE), known commercially as the Ethiopian Shipping and Logistics, is the national cargo shipping company of Ethiopia. Established in 1964, it has continued to operate despite Ethiopia having become a landlocked country in 1993; its main base is now the Port of Djibouti and Berbera in Somaliland. Ethiopian Shipping and Logistics Services Enterprise is a subsidiary of Ethiopian Investment Holdings (EIH), the sovereign wealth fund of Ethiopia.

== History ==
Ethiopia regained a coastline on the Red Sea when Eritrea was federated with Ethiopia in 1952. However, it was not until 1965 that the Ethiopian Shipping and Logistics was established as a joint venture with the American company Towers Perrin. A Dutch company was contracted to manage the line along the lines of the then-ongoing arrangement with TWA to manage the flag carrier airline Ethiopian Airlines.

Operations commenced in 1966 with three ships called Queen of Sheba, Lion of Judah and Lalibela. The line quickly faced serious challenges when the Suez Canal was closed in 1967. Until Suez Canal was opened again, the vessels had to go all around the Cape. The size of the ships was not appropriate for such long voyages, and the company ran into a loss. Since then, the ESL has focused mainly on domestic import and export, to promote foreign trade. It has generally been profitable.

== See also ==
- List of largest container shipping companies
- Messina Line
- Ocean Network Express
