= Kingdom of Damot =

Medieval kingdom in southern Ethiopia from 900 to 1317

Coordinates: 9.39°N 37.56°E

- c. 10th/13th century–c. 16th century
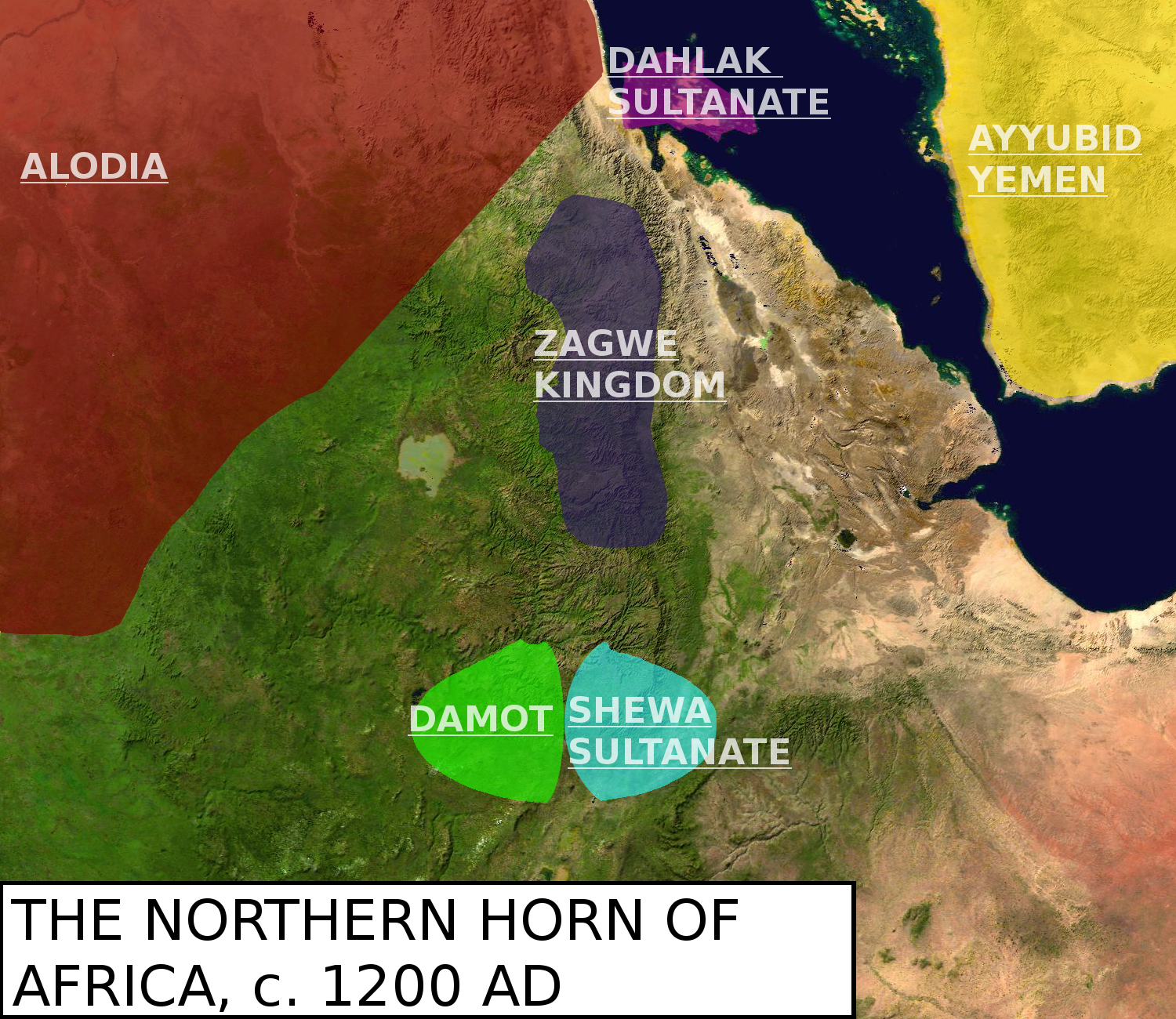
- The kingdom of Damot and its neighbours circa 1200 AD
- Capital: Maldarede
- Common languages: Gonga, and other North Omotic languages
- Religion: Paganism, Christianity
- Government: Monarchy
- Motalami
- History
  - Established: c. 10th/13th century
  - Conquered by Ethiopia: c. 1316
  - Dissolution (By the 16th century, Damot was further fragmented and ultimately overrun during the Oromo expansion): c. 16th century
Succeeded by
Ethiopian Empire; Ennarea
- Today part of: Ethiopia

The Kingdom of Damot was a medieval kingdom in what is now western Ethiopia. The territory was positioned below the Blue Nile. Possibly formed in the 10th century, it was a powerful state by the 13th century that forced the Sultanate of Shewa to pay tributes. It also annihilated the armies of the Zagwe dynasty that were sent to subdue its territory. Damot conquered several Muslim and Christian territories. The Muslim state Showa and the new Christian state under Yekuno Amlak formed an alliance to counter the influence of Damot in the region.

Some academics have proposed that Damot was equivalent to the Kingdom of Wolaita, with the most famous ruler of Damot, Motolomi Sato, coming from the Wolaita Malla dynasty which ruled from the 13th to 16th centuries, before being replaced by the Tigre Malla dynasty amid the Oromo expansion. Part of the kingdom's former northern territory continued to be under Ethiopian rule as the province of the same name around Gojjam.

== History ==
Possibly formed in the 10th century, Damot was a powerful state by the 13th century that forced the Sultanate of Showa to pay tribute. The kings of Damot, who bore the title motalami, resided in a town which, according to the hagiography of Tekle Haymanot, was called Maldarede. The hagiography also states the kingdom was likely bordered on the north by Bete Amhara according to E. A. Wallis Budge. Zena Petros failed a campaign he led against Damot to extract tribute. 14th-century Arab historian Ibn Khaldun mentions the ancestors of Walasma (Ifat Sultanate) were once tributary to the kingdom.

Damot was conquered by Emperor Amda Seyon in 1316/7. His royal chronicle recounted that "all the people of Damot [came] into my hands; its king, its princes, its rulers, and its people, men and women without number, whom I exiled into another area." Amda Seyon seemingly left the Damotian royal family in power, for the title motälämi continued to be used until the 15th century. Al-Mufaddal ibn Abi al-Fada'il in the 14th century writes that Damot alongside Harla Kingdom were forced to pay tribute to Abyssinia.

Damot was originally located south of the Abay River and west of the Muger River. However, the kingdom’s decline began in the 14th century, as suggested by some sources, such as Paulos Milkias, who argues that the Oromo conquest of Damot may have started earlier than widely believed. This earlier timeline helps explain why Aba Bahrey, writing in the 16th century, provides little detail about Damot’s fall—it had already been displaced or weakened long before his time. Instead, Aba Bahrey focuses on how the Oromos used the "west," once part of Damot’s territories, as a base for military campaigns, crossing the Abay River to invade the Kingdom of Ennarea in the "southwest" (modern-day Jimma). In the medieval period gold and slaves were acquired by Muslim traders to the Kingdom of Damot and the Hadiya Sultanate, who were known for slave raiding, to the Christian Amhara who (during that time) opposed castration.

By the late 16th century, under the leadership of Mula'ata Lubas (1586–1594), the Macha Oromo overran Ennarea amid the Oromo expansion and forced its clans to flee across the Abay River into Gojjam. Many of these displaced populations settled in the sub-provinces of Bure Damot and Daga Damot, though the Oromos pursued them until they were fully subdued. Unlike other conquering groups, the Oromos incorporated the people they defeated, requiring them to adopt Oromo culture and language. This practice boosted their numbers and facilitated their expansion into the highlands.

Paulos Milkias suggested that areas like Walal (near Mount Tullu Walal in Qelem, Wallaga) were inhabited by Kafa-descended people known as Busase or Bushasho before the Oromo conquest. Following the fall of Damot, a Christian temple in the region was converted into a church, and descendants of the Busase people continue to inhabit parts of Anfilo, producing coffee for both local and export consumption.

Their territory extended east beyond the Muger as far as the Jamma. The province of Damot remained part of the Ethiopian Empire well after the Zemene Mesafint began, unlike other southern regions. The ruler of Damot was typically from Gojjam and held the title Ras.

== Religion ==
The population of Damot adhered to its own religion dominated by a deity called Däsk. This continued on even well after being conquered by the Christian Ethiopian Empire, which repeatedly led to conflict between the locals and the Christian garrison troops. Parts of the population seemingly remained pagan until the late 16th century.

In the Hagiography of Tekle Haymanot he managed to convert the ruler of Damot to Christianity.
