= Ethiopian Postal Service =

National postal service of Ethiopia

- የኢትዮጵያ ፖስታ አገልግሎት

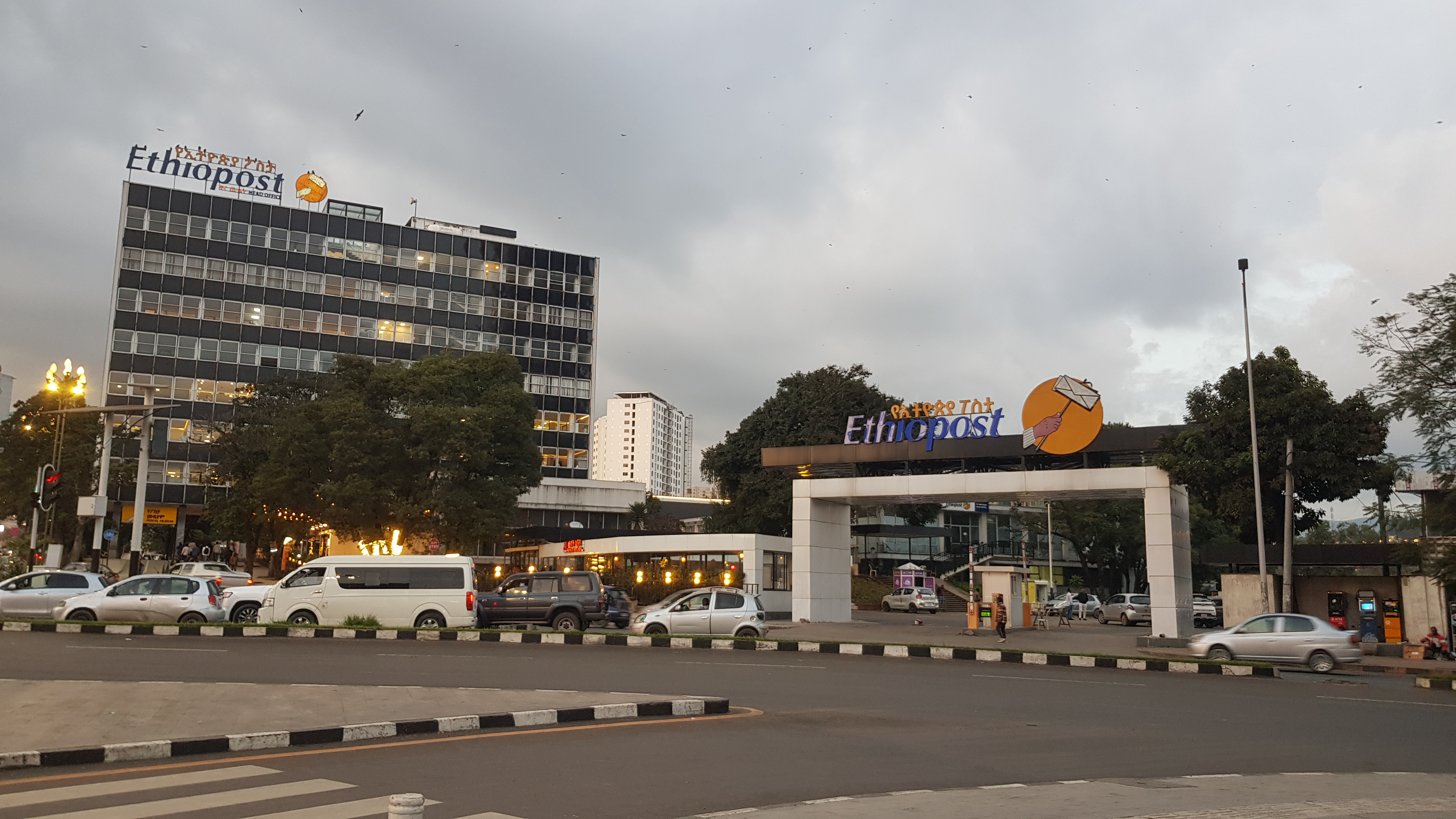
- Headquarters of Ethiopost in Addis Ababa
- Established: 9 March 1894; 132 years ago
- Founder: Emperor Menelik II
- Type: National postal service
- Headquarters: Nigeria St, Addis Ababa, Ethiopia
- Coordinates: 9.024°N 38.760°E
- CEO: Dagmawi Hailiye
- Revenue: 74.8 million birr (2022)
- Staff: over 2,300
- Website: www.ethiopostal.com

The Ethiopian Postal Service (Amharic: የኢትዮጵያ ፖስታ አገልግሎት), known as Ethiopost, is the national postal service of Ethiopia established in 1894 by Emperor Menelik II.

== History ==
The Ethiopian Postal Service was founded by Emperor Menelik II on 9 March 1894; the postal stamps were printed in Paris which sold in Harar in early 1895, later reaching to Dire Dawa, Entoto and Addis Ababa. It had valid inland postage of Ethiopia and was not a member of the Universal Postal Union (UPU). On 1 November 1908, the Emperor sent letter to UPU and Ethiopia became the member.

The UPU then issued new Ethiopian stamp with bilingual form, and out of seven denominations, the four were designed Menelik's sculpture depicting wearing his golden crown and Lion of Judah. The second stamps warranted until 1919 and 15 new stamps were incremented in from that year.

== Objectives ==
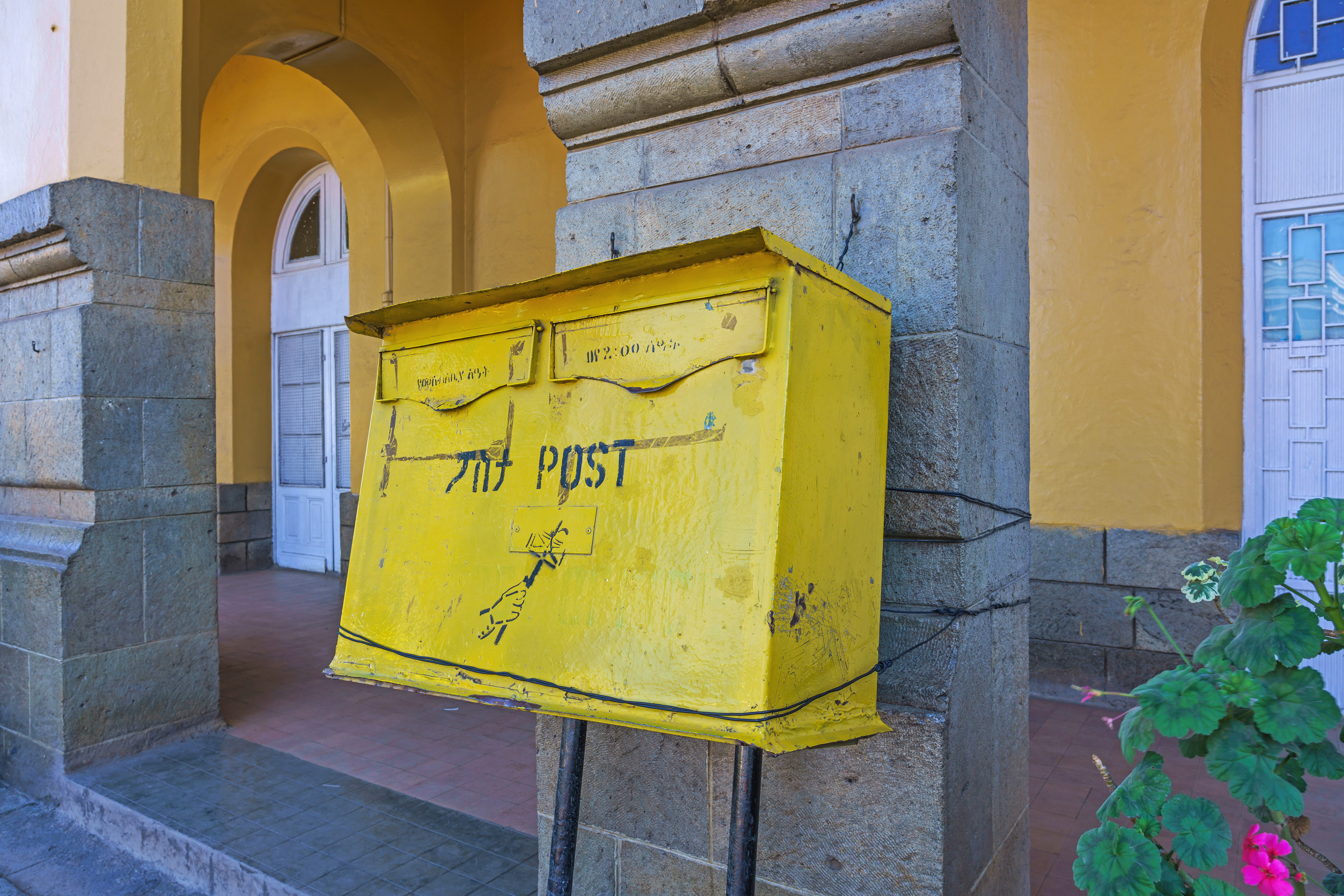
A post box in Addis Ababa

The purpose of the Ethiopian Postal Service is to allow a portal for mail acceptance, transfer deliveries and other postal services for its customers. The act of allowing these services to take place initially started as a need for the Ethiopian people to communicate on a nationwide scale. Ethiopost was created by law with the view to establish and promote Postal Services based on the development.

== Audience ==
- The general public
- Embassies and consulates
- International organizations

== Rebranding ==
As part of the reform process, the name of the organization has been changed from 'Ethiopian Postal Service Enterprise' to "Ethiopost" in 2019.

== See also ==
- List of national postal services#Africa
