= Dire Dawa Free Trade Zone =

Ethiopian trade and logistics area

- Free Trade Zone
- Country: Ethiopia
- City: Dire Dawa
- Established: August 2022

Area
  - Total: 1.5 km^{2} (0.58 sq mi)
- Time zone: UTC+3 (EAT)

The Dire Dawa Free Trade Zone is an Ethiopian trade and logistics area launched in August 2022.

It is located in Dire Dawa, a chartered city in eastern Ethiopia, with access to the Djibouti border, the Addis Ababa–Djibouti Railway, and regional highways.

== Overview ==
The Dire Dawa Free Trade Zone (DDFTZ) was established by the Government of Ethiopia with the aim of improving trade efficiency, reducing logTheistics costs, and enhance industrial development. It also reflects the government's broader objective to strengthen the economy, lower import-export costs, and attract foreign investments.

The zone was launched on an initial area of 150 hectares, with future expansion planned to reach up to 4,000 hectares. It is intended to serve as a regional logistics and industrial hub, taking advantage of Dire Dawa's location to facilitate import-export activities. The government also views the zone as a tool to help reduce inflationary pressures, create employment opportunities, and combat illicit trade by promoting regulated commerce and security.

== Features and infrastructure ==
The Dire Dawa Free Trade Zone was developed in collaboration with the Ethiopian Investment Commission (EIC), the Ministry of Transport and Logistics, and the Ethiopian Shipping and Logistics Services Enterprise (ESLSE). It includes:

=== Proximity to key trade routes ===
Located approximately 348 kilometers from the Port of Djibouti and 507 kilometers from Berbera Port. It is also 2.8 kilometers from the Dire Dawa dry port and 25.2 kilometers from Dire Dawa International Airport.

=== Transport connectivity ===
Linked to the Addis Ababa–Djibouti Railway and adjacent to major highways, supporting multimodal logistics operations.

=== Warehousing and logistics facilities ===
The site includes 15 factory sheds, a 4-hectare open storage yard, and 48 hectares of serviced land with utilities to support warehousing, value-added processing, and customs operations.

=== Administrative and auxiliary services ===
A one-stop service center is provided for administrative procedures. An area of 1,500 square meters is designated for financial, insurance, and related services. Additional infrastructure includes a waste treatment plant, showrooms, an exhibition hall, and residential housing (316 homes for expatriates).
