= Kawo Tona Gaga =

King of Wolaita from 1870 to 1896

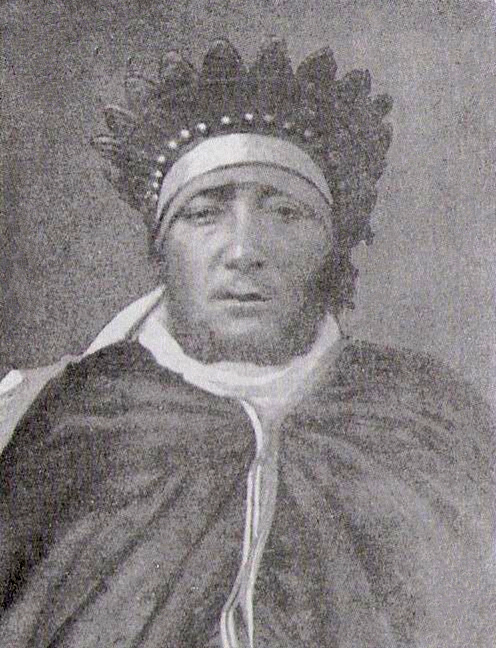

King of the Kingdom of Wolaita
- Reign: 1870–1896
- Predecessor: Gaga Gobe
- Successor: Annexation to the Ethiopian Empire

Kawo Tona Gaga was the last and most powerful king of the Kingdom of Wolaita. Tona Gaga was the 17th Kawo, or king, of the Tigre dynasty, the last independent dynasty of the Wolayta people.

== History ==
Upon succeeding his grandfather in 1890 he quickly built ties with the Kingdom of Jimma, a tributary of the Ethiopian Empire, marrying the daughter of Abba Jifar II. However, he refused to pay tribute to Shewa (unlike his predecessors, who were more of diplomats than warriors). He then tried to draw the smaller Omotic Kullo and Konta into his orbit as client states, however, Menelik's cousin Wolde Gyorgis successfully campaigned through both. After six times of failed protectorate attempts, Emperor Menelik II reached the border of Wolaita after a two weeks march from Addis Abeba, calling on the king to pay tribute and avoid the destruction of his kingdom. Tona prepared his fortifications and refused negotiation. Expertly dug defensive trenches and mounds crippled the initial assault, but Tona Gaga was eventually pushed out of his strongpoint and caught between the Ethiopians and Oromo auxiliaries sent by Abba Jifar II, who had betrayed Tona Gaga. After his capture in 1894, the ex-king was baptized as Tekle Haymanot and made the governor of his previous dominion. He would later assist Menelik II in multiple campaigns.

As some source reveals, as Menelik II failed to subdue the Kingdom of Wolaita, he had tried all his best to ask the Wolayita prisoners which were in prison at Addis Ababa, the secret behind the successfulness of the Tona's army and weakness of the army members. Using this secret as a weapon, Menelik II had gained a chance to fully control the Kingdom, though they continued to be ruled by their own king until the rise of Derg regime.

Preceded by Gaga Gobe	Kingdom of Wolaita; 1890 - 1896	Office abolished
