= Beklo Segno =

Town in Wolaita, Ethiopia

Beklo Segno: Baluqo Saynno (Wolaytta); በቅሎ ሰኞ (Amharic)
- Town
- Location within Wolayita Location within Ethiopia
- Coordinates: 6°49′54″N 37°38′30″E
- Country: Ethiopia
- Region: South Ethiopia Regional State
- Zone: Wolaita
- District: Bayra Koysha

Area
  - Urban: 7.55 km^{2} (2.92 sq mi)
- Elevation: 1,932 m (6,339 ft)
- Time zone: UTC+3 (EAT)

Beklo Segno or Baqulo Sagno (Geʽez: በቅሎ ሰኞ, Wolayttattuwa: Baluqo Saynno) is a town in Wolayita Zone, South Ethiopia Regional State, Ethiopia. The town is an administrative center of Bayra Koysha district of Wolayita Zone, Ethiopia. Beklo Segno is located about 327 km away from Addis Ababa to the south on and 18 km away from Sodo to the West, the capital of Wolaita Zone. The amenities in the town are, 24 hours electricity, pure public water, banks, schools, postal service, telecommunications services and others. Beklo Segno lies between 6°49"54" N and 37°38'30" E. The town is located at an elevation of 1,932 meters above sea level.

== Climate ==
In the months of January and February, temperature in the town of Beklo Segno is at around 29°c and average of 366.4615 hours of sunshine in a month. Whereas July and August are the coldest months with temperature at around 15°c. April and May receive most rainfall with precipitation count of 218.97mm.

Climate data for Beklo Segno
Month	Jan	Feb	Mar	Apr	May	Jun	Jul	Aug	Sep	Oct	Nov	Dec	Year
Mean daily maximum °C (°F)	28 (82)	28 (82)	30 (86)	26 (79)	23 (73)	22 (72)	18 (64)	21 (70)	21 (70)	23 (73)	25 (77)	27 (81)	24 (76)
Daily mean °C (°F)	23 (73)	23 (73)	25 (77)	22 (72)	20 (68)	19 (66)	16 (61)	19 (66)	19 (66)	20 (68)	21 (70)	23 (73)	21 (69)
Mean daily minimum °C (°F)	17 (63)	17 (63)	19 (66)	17 (63)	15 (59)	15 (59)	12 (54)	15 (59)	16 (61)	16 (61)	16 (61)	16 (61)	16 (61)
Average precipitation mm (inches)	19.48 (0.77)	37.28 (1.47)	108.60 (4.28)	218.97 (8.62)	189.23 (7.45)	148.77 (5.86)	174.74 (6.88)	175.23 (6.90)	189.11 (7.45)	127.83 (5.03)	63.96 (2.52)	23.52 (0.93)	1,476.72 (58.16)
Source: worldweatheronline.com
