= Motolomi Sato =

King of the Kingdom of Wolaita
- Reign: 1252 to 1298
Names
- Kawo Motolomi Sato
Regnal name
- King Motolomi
- Dynasty: Wolaita Malla Dynasty

Motolomi Sato or Kawo Motolomi Sato was the founder and one of the most famous kings of the Kingdom of Wolaita. He ruled part of present day Ethiopia in the 12th century under the Damot Kingdom under Wolayta malla dynasty. Kawo Motolomi was an expansionist king of Wolaita. The son of king Sato, he was of the indigenous and heroic Wolaitta-Malla family and his family can still be found in Wolaita. The governmental center of the Wolaita during the Motolami era was at the summit of a gorgeous mountain known as Damota, which ultimately became the name of the kingdom. The force of cavalry and infantry besieged Kawo Motolomi's palace, known as Xaazza Garuwaa.

== Military power ==
King Motolomi was a well-known military leader who possessed trained cavalry and infantry, his army, who camped in several caves around Damota Mountain. Kawo Motolomi’s period was the Golden Age of Wolaita history. The Wolaita was extremely powerful and dominated the whole region by the end of the 13th century.
