= Ministry of Revenues and Customs Authority (Ethiopia) =

Government ministry of Ethiopia

- ገቢዎች ሚኒስቴር

Agency overview
- Formed: 7 July 2008; 17 years ago
- Preceding agency: Ministry of Capacity Building
- Jurisdiction: Ethiopian government
- Headquarters: Addis Ababa, Ethiopia
- Minister responsible: Aynalem Nigussie
- Child agency: Ethiopian Customs Commission
- Website: www.mor.gov.et

The Ministry of Revenues and Customs Authority (Amharic: ገቢዎች ሚኒስቴር) is an Ethiopian government department responsible for collecting taxes and customs duties. It was established in 2008 under Proclamation No.916/2008 by reorganizing the former ministry Ministry of Capacity Building.

== Overview ==
The ministry was established under Proclamation No.916/2008 on 7 July 2008 with reorganization from the former Ministry of Capacity Building. Its envisaged to observe public service and complete its mission ethically by 2020, as well as contributing economic development and social welfare by promoting modern Tax and Customs Administration. In 2022/23 fiscal year, the ministry sought to secure 450 billion birr in tax revenue. The current minister is Aynalem Nigussie from 2020.
