= Kawo Koysha =

District in South Ethiopia Regional State

Kawo Koysha: Kawo Koysha Allaana (Wolaytta); ካዎ ኮይሻ ወረዳ (Amharic)
- Woreda
- Interactive map of Kawo Koysha
- Country: Ethiopia
- Region: South Ethiopia Regional State
- Zone: Wolaita
- Seat: Lasho

Government
  - Chief administrator: Daniel Mena (Prosperity Party)
- Time zone: UTC+3 (EAT)

Kawo Koysha is one of the woredas in the South Ethiopia Regional State of Ethiopia and part of the Wolayita Zone. Kawo Koysha is bordered on the south by Offa woreda, on the west by the Kindo Didaye, on the north and east by Kindo Koysha. Kawo Koysha woreda was established in 2019 from the surrounding woredas. The administrative center of this woreda is Lasho Town.
