= Kingdom of Wolaita =

1251–1894 kingdom in southern Ethiopia

- (Traditionally) c. 1251–1896
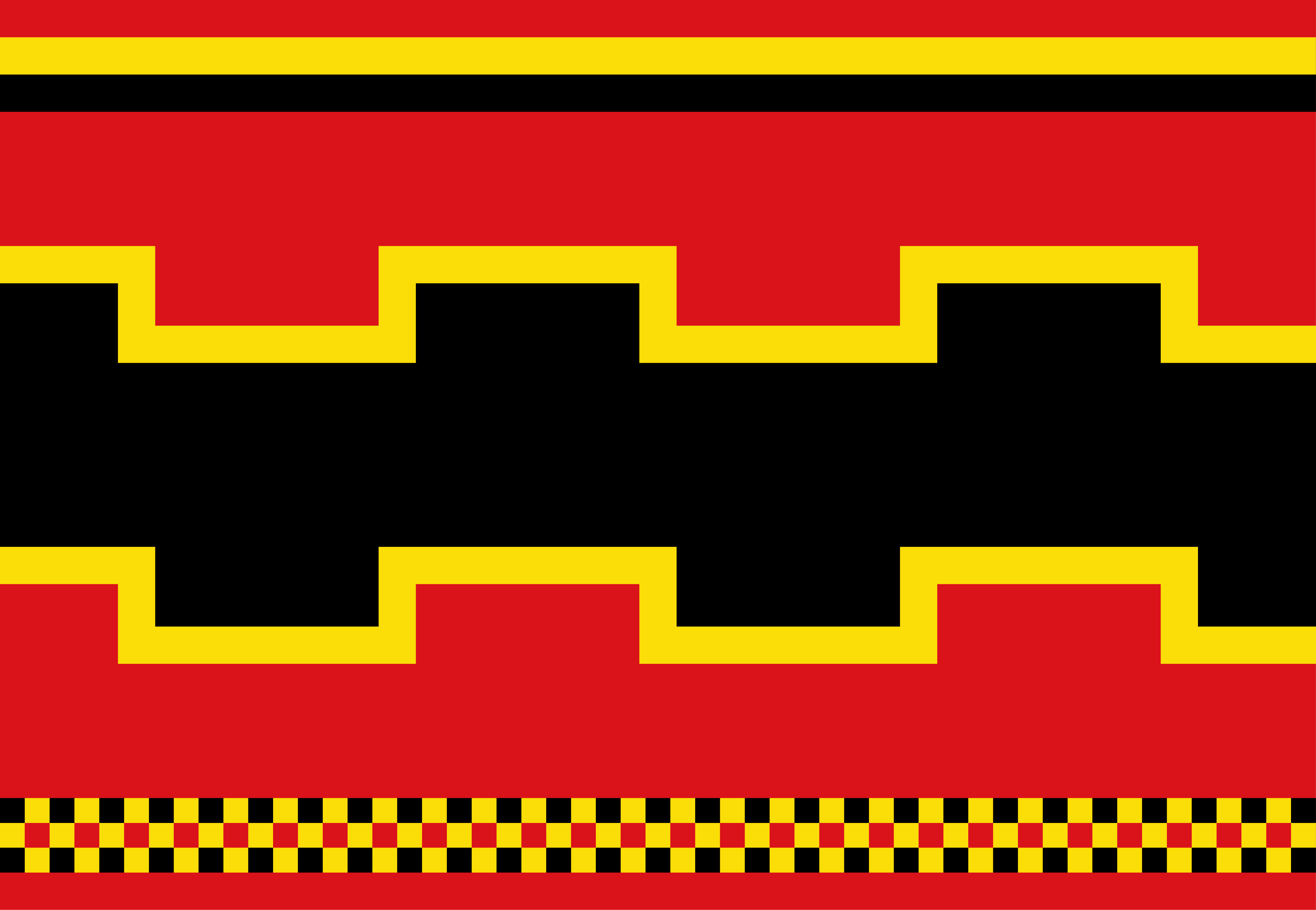
- Traditional Wolaita pattern
- Capital: Lasho, Dalbo, Sodo
- Common languages: Wolaitta and other Ometo languages
- Religion: Officially Christianity, Paganism
- Government: Monarchy
- Kawo (transl. Majesty or King)
  - 1251–1298 (first): Motolomi Sato
  - 1870–1896 (last): Kawo Tona Gaga
- Historical era: Middle Ages to Early modern period
  - Wolaita Malla Dynasty: (Traditionally) c. 1251
  - Tigre Malla dynasty: c. 16th century
  - Annexed by Ethiopian Empire: 1896
- Currency: Marchuwa
Preceded by	Succeeded by
Kingdom of Damot	Ethiopian Empire
- Today part of: Ethiopia

Kingdom of Wolaita, was a kingdom dominated by Wolayta people in today's southern Ethiopia from 1251 until conquest of Ethiopian Empire in 1896.

Some academics have claimed that Wolaita was equivalent to the Kingdom of Damot, a medieval kingdom that flourished from the 13th to 16th centuries until the Oromo expansion, during which the Wolaita Malla dynasty was replaced by the Tigre Malla dynasty.

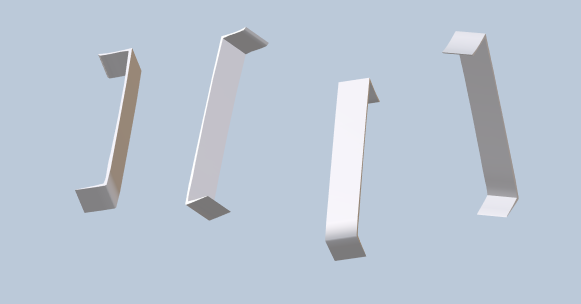
Illustrated example of Marchuwa currency symbol of the Kingdom of Wolaita

== History ==
Wolaita tradition refunds the kingdom being well organized and ruled by strong kings since the 13th century. In this tradition, the kingdom ruled vast territories from modern Wolaita up to the central and northern areas of the country. Kindo Didaye, one of the sixteen woredas of Wolaita Zone, is the area of origin of the people and the Wolaita kingdom. The Adalites maintained a temporary occupation of the kingdom in the sixteenth century; however, they subsequently retreated owing to the territory's inhospitable environmental circumstances, which the Adal chronicler Arab Faqih characterized as exceptionally marshy and waterlogged. Its territories diminished to the present area because of different factors among which the Oromo expansion and challenges from rival people and states were the main ones. In the 17th century, king Gazenja secured many victories over the Oromo. By 1830, the Wolaita were reduced to a tributary state of the Kingdom of Kaffa.

== Currency ==
In the early days of the trade, cotton thread known as shalwa was used as a currency before it was replaced by iron currency known as marchuwa. Shaluwa and marchuwa as a currency were used not only in Wolaita, but also among the societies that settled along this trade route as well.

== Conflicts ==
Kawo Tona Gaga, the last king of the Wolaita kingdom, was believed to be one of its greatest warriors and most powerful kings. Emperor Menelik II of Ethiopia initially ordered Ras Mengesha Atikem of Gojjam to campaign south in order to feed his men, which put the Wolaita Kingdom in his crosshairs. However, they had experience building fortifications due to conflict with the Oromo people and repulsed the invasion. The new king Tona Gaga then set about raising an army personally loyal to him from "deposed castes and royal slaves." Menelik later marched south, calling on the king to pay tribute and spare his kingdom after reaching the border of Wolaita. Tona prepared his fortifications and refused negotiation. He also relied mistakenly upon understandings with the Oromo. Expertly dug defensive trenches and mounds crippled the initial assault, but encircling sweeps by Menelik's forces drove Tona Gaga onto the slopes of Mount Damota and he was soon caught between the Ethiopians and Oromo auxiliaries led by Ras Wolde Gyorgis, having been captured by a soldier of Negus Mikael. Abba Jifar II had sent the auxiliaries, betraying Tona Gaga.

== Rulers ==
Wolaita had different dynasties, as well as different rulers. They ruled the kingdom using the title "Kawo."

== See also ==
- Gifaata
