= Ethiopian Investment Commission =

Ethiopian non-governmental organization

- የኢትዮጵያ ኢንቨስትመንት ኮሚሽን
- Formation: 1992; 34 years ago
- Type: Government agency
- Headquarters: Addis Ababa, Ethiopia
- Region served: Ethiopia
- Commissioner: Zeleke Temesgen
- Deputy Commissioner: Dagato Kumbe
- Deputy Commissioner: Zinabu Yirga
- Revenue: 103 million USD (2019)
- Website: www.invest-ethiopia.com

The Ethiopian Investment Commission (Amharic: የኢትዮጵያ ኢንቨስትመንት ኮሚሽን, EIC) is an Ethiopian autonomous government organization established in 1992 to promote private investment, mainly working for foreign direct investment in Ethiopia.

== Background ==
The Ethiopian Investment Commission (EIC) was established in 1992 to foster private investment sector in Ethiopia. EIC is responsible for offering one-stop services to investors, issuing investment permits, registering technology transfer agreements and facilitating the acquisition of land, utilities and other service for investor. EIC act as liaison between investor and government agencies and offers informative and motivative information and guidelines for opportunities. EIC is administered by a commissioner who is a member of board. The commissioner reports to the Prime Minister.

On 2 September 2020, EIC has published an update of its regulatory structure under Regulation No. 474/2020 based on liberalization of Ethiopian economy for foreign investors, while retaining joint venture with the government and domestic investors. Under the regulation, the EIC directs every aspect of foreign investments such as permit application and national content requirements.

== List of commissioners ==
- Mekonnen Manyazewal (1992–1995)
- Tefera Walwa (1995–1998)
- Kassahun Ayele (1998–2002)
- Abi Woldemeskel (2002–2006)
- Belachew Mekuria (2006–2012)
- Mohammed Seid (2012-2013)
- Fitsum Arega (February 2013 – 25 April 2018)
- Belachew Mekuria (25 April 2018 – 11 September 2018)
- Fitsum Arega (5 November 2018 – 24 December 2018)
- Abebe Abebayehu (26 December 2018 – June 2020)
- Lalise Neme ( June 2020 - January 2024)
- Hanna Arayaselassie (January 2024 – October 2024)
- Zeleke Temesgen(PhD) (October 2024 - Present)
