= Ethiopian First League =

Ethiopian association football league

EFF League one
- Country: Ethiopia (32 teams)
- Confederation: CAF
- Number of clubs: 55
- Level on pyramid: 3
- Promotion to: Ethiopian Higher League
- Domestic cup(s): Ethiopian Cup; Ethiopian Super Cup
- Current: 2020–21 Ethiopian First League

The Ethiopian Football Federation League One (EFF League one) (Amharic: የኢትዮጵያ አንደኛ ሊግ) is the third division of Ethiopian football. The league is run by the Ethiopian Football Federation.

== Teams ==
2021-22 The 2021-22 (2013 E.C.) edition of the league, 48 clubs were split into three different groups each in a designated host city.

=== Group 1: Host City - Wolaita Sodo and Bishoftu ===
Team	Home City
Boditi City	Boditi
Dire Dawa Police	Dire Dawa
Lideta Sub-city	Addis Ababa
Bule Horra City	Bule Hora
Wenji Suger	Wenji
Dukem City	Dukem
Meki City	Meki
Misrak Sub-city	Hawassa
Goba City	Goba
Limu Genet	Limu
Arada Sub-city	Addis Ababa

=== Group 2: Host City - Burayu and Welkite ===
Team	Home City
Holeta City	Holeta
Addis Addis Police	Addis Ababa
Hadya Lemo	Fonko
Metu City	Metu
Mojo City	Mojo
Nifas Silk Lafto Sub-city	Addis Ababa
Harar City	Harar
Durame City	Durame
Mekelakeye B	Addis Ababa
Varnero Woreda 13	
Jinka City	Jinka
Waliso FC	Waliso

=== Group 3: Host City - Asella and Burayu ===
Team	Home City
Areka City	Areka
Robe City	Robe
Angacha City	Angacha
Legetafo 01	Legetafo
Asosa City	Asosa
Gofa Barenche	Sawla
Bole Sub-city	Addis Ababa
Sululta City	Sululta
Addis Sub-city	Addis Ababa
Bishoftu City	Bishoftu
Nisir Club	
