= 2021–22 Ethiopian First League =

== 2021-22 ==
The 2021-22 (2013 E.C.) edition of the league, 48 clubs were split into three different groups each in a designated host city.

== Group 1: Host City - Wolaita Sodo and Bishoftu ==
Team	Home City
Boditi City	Boditi
Dire Dawa Police	Dire Dawa
Lideta Sub-city	Addis Ababa
Bule Horra City	Bule Hora
Wenji Suger	Wenji
Dukem City	Dukem
Meki City	Meki
Misrak Sub-city	Hawassa
Goba City	Goba
Limu Genet	Limu
Arada Sub-city	Addis Ababa

== Group 2: Host City - Burayu and Welkite ==
Team	Home City
Holeta City	Holeta
Addis Addis Police	Addis Ababa
Hadya Lemo	Fonko
Metu City	Metu
Mojo City	Mojo
Nifas Silk Lafto Sub-city	Addis Ababa
Harar City	Harar
Durame City	Durame
Mekelakeye B	Addis Ababa
Varnero Woreda 13	
Jinka City	Jinka
Waliso FC	Waliso

== Group 3: Host City - Asella and Burayu ==
Team	Home City
Areka City	Areka
Robe City	Robe
Angacha City	Angacha
Legetafo 01	Legetafo
Asosa City	Asosa
Gofa Barenche	Sawla
Bole Sub-city	Addis Ababa
Sululta City	Sululta
Addis Sub-city	Addis Ababa
Bishoftu City	Bishoftu
Nisir Club	

== Group A ==
Pos	Team	Pld	W	D	L	GF	GA	GD	Pts	Qualification
1	Mekelakeya B (Q)	4	3	0	1	8	5	+3	9	Knockout stage
2	Robe City (Q)	4	2	1	1	8	5	+3	7	Knockout stage
3	Holeta City	4	2	1	1	4	5	−1	7	
4	Gofa Barenche	4	1	0	3	3	5	−2	3	
5	Harar City FC (R)	4	0	2	2	4	7	−3	2	Relegation

Rules for classification: Tiebreakers
(Q) Qualified for the phase indicated; (R) Relegated

== Group B ==
Pos	Team	Pld	W	D	L	GF	GA	GD	Pts	Qualification
1	Durame City (Q)	4	3	0	1	8	5	+3	9	Knockout stage
2	Jinka City	0	0	0	0	0	0	0	0	Knockout stage
3	Bule Hora City	4	2	1	1	4	5	−1	7	
4	Sululta City	4	1	0	3	3	5	−2	3	
5	Angacha City (R)	4	0	2	2	4	7	−3	2	Relegation

Rules for classification: Tiebreakers
(Q) Qualified for the phase indicated; (R) Relegated

== Group C ==
Pos	Team	Pld	W	D	L	GF	GA	GD	Pts	Qualification
1	Boditi City (Q)	3	2	1	0	5	2	+3	7	Knockout stage
2	Addis ketema sub city (Q)	3	0	3	0	2	2	0	3	Knockout stage
3	Areka City	3	0	2	1	3	4	−1	2	
4	Dukem city	3	0	2	1	3	5	−2	2	

Rules for classification: Tiebreakers
(Q) Qualified for the phase indicated

{{Football box

== Group D ==
Pos	Team	Pld	W	D	L	GF	GA	GD	Pts	Qualification
1	Dire Dawa Police (Q)	3	2	1	0	6	1	+5	7	Knockout stage
2	NSL Sub city (Q)	3	1	2	0	4	3	+1	5	Knockout stage
3	Arada Sub city	3	1	0	2	2	3	−1	3	
4	Lideta Sub city	3	0	1	2	1	6	−5	1	

Rules for classification: Tiebreakers
(Q) Qualified for the phase indicated

{{Football box
