= Wolaita Dicha U-20 FC =

Association football club in Ethiopia

- Full name: Wolaita Dicha U-20 Football Club
- Nickname: The Bees of Tona
- Ground: Sodo Stadium; Sodo, Ethiopia
- Capacity: 30,000
- League: Ethiopian U-20 Premier League
- Website: http://wolaittadsc.org/
Home colours	Away colours

Wolaita Dicha U-20 F.C. or ወላይታ ዲቻ ከ20 ዓመት በታች እግር ኳስ ክሌብ is Ethiopian football club at an under-20 age level and is controlled by the Ethiopian Football Federation. Wolaita Dicha u-20 is a football club known for producing young players. Because of this the club makes a significant contribution to strengthen main Wolaita Dicha football team. During the 2021 tournament, the team was disbanded due to a lack of budgets. However, the club was reorganized the following year and won Ethiopian Under-20 Premier League title for the second time. The team typically contender in U-20 Premier League tournament in Ethiopia.

== Stadium ==
Wolaita Dicha U-20 F.C. uses Wolaita Sodo Stadium for its home matches and training. During 2018/19 season Wolaita Sodo Stadium is under improvement and because of this the club used Boditi Stadium.

== Competition and titles won ==
Wolaita dicha u-20 football club is most successful team which won Ethiopian u-20 premier league. The club also able to won 2022 premier league season after reorganizing itself from disbandment in preceding year.

== See also ==
- Wolaitta Dicha S.C.
- Wolaita Dicha Volleyball Club
