= Ari Zone =

Zone in the South Ethiopia Regional State

Coordinates: 5°58′N 36°36′E

Ari Zone Ari
- Zone
- Interactive map of Ari Zone
- Country: Ethiopia
- Region: South Ethiopia Regional State
- Capital: Jinka

Government
  - Chief Administrator: Afedo Worku (Prosperity Party)
- Time zone: UTC+3 (EAT)

Map of the regions and zones of Ethiopia

Ari is an administrative zone in South Ethiopia Regional State. Until August 2023, Ari was a part of the South Omo Zone. It is named for the Aari people, whose homeland is in the zone. Ari is bordered on the south by South Omo Zone, on the Northeast by the Gofa Zone and North by the Basketo Zone. The administrative centre of Ari Zone is Jinka.

== Administrative division ==
Ari Zone has four districts and three city administrations.

districts and town administrations in Ari Zone
Number	Districts	Seat
1	Baka Dawla Ari	Arkisha Kaysa
2	Debub Ari	Gazer*
3	North Ari	Gelila*
4	Woba Ari	Boyka
5	Gelila City Administration	Gelila
6	Gazer City Administration	Gazer
7	Jinka City Administration	Jinka

* Town administrations, which are considered as district for all administrative purposes. Jinka which is the seat of the Zone is also considered as a town administration.
