= Wolaita Tussa SC =

Association football club in Ethiopia

Wolaita Tussa
- Full name: Wolaita Tussa Sport Club
- Founded: 1988; 37 years ago
- Ground: Wolaita Sodo Stadium; Wolaita Sodo, Ethiopia
- Capacity: 30,000
Home colours

Wolaita Tussa Sports Club (Amharic: ወላይታ ቱሳ እግር ኳስ ክሌብ), also known as Wolaita Tussa, is a professional football club based in Wolaita Sodo, Ethiopia. The club was founded in 1988 by known pop of catholic missioner Gino Benanti. After its formation the club was well known and popular in southern region. They were a member of the Ethiopian Football Federation and now participating in Ethiopia U-20 Premier league. But latter on after playing the first round Wolaita Zone Youth and Sport department declared that Wolaita Tussa would not continue the second round because of budget deficit.

== Title won ==
Wolaitta Tussa Sport Club, together with Hawassa City Sport Club and St. George Sport Club, flourished in the international competition. As it was, the club had a fierce competition with Addis Ababa Clubs. Wolaita Tussa won Ethiopian Cup in 1997. Wolaita Tussa, first ever club represented Ethiopia in CAF Confederation Cup from south before any other clubs playing in the southern region next to Hawassa Flour FC.

== Stadium ==
Wolaita Tussa uses Wolaita Sodo Stadium and also Hawassa international stadium as well.
