= Boditi Stadium =

Stadium in Wolaita, Ethiopia

- Boditte Ambbaa Toho Kuwaasiya Dembbaa
- Interactive map of Boditi Stadium
- Full name: Boditi City Stadium
- Location: Boditi, Ethiopia
- Coordinates: 6.9552°N 37.8615°E
- Owner: Boditi City Administration
- Capacity: 1500

Tenants
- Boditi City F.C. Wolaitta Dicha S.C. Ethiopia national football team (selected matches)

Boditi Stadium or Boditi City Stadium is a stadium in Southern Ethiopia within Wolayita Zone. The stadium is multipurpose stadium based in Boditi city, Northeastern part of Wolayita Zone. It is primarily used for concerts and also serves as Boditi City F.C.'s home stadium. And it used by Wolaita Dicha sport club for matches of Ethiopian Premier League as home stadium when Sodo Stadium is under renewal and enlargement in 2007 and 2008 Ethiopian calendar. The full capacity for seated spectators enjoying a football match at Boditi Stadium is about 1,500. The stadium geographical location lies on the 6°57'19" N and 37°51'37" E. And also elevation of the stadium is 2038 meters above the sea level.
