= Dawit Abebe =

Ethiopian contemporary artist

Dawit Abebe is an Ethiopian contemporary artist. Dawit's goal as an artist is to raise awareness of Addis Ababa's contemporary art scene as well as its society and history. He believes that in order for humans to progress, it is essential that a nation and its citizens understand how the past has shaped present life through his art.

== Career ==
Dawit Abebe graduated with a degree in painting, sculpture, graphics, photography, and industrial design from the Alle School of Fine Art and Design program in Addis Ababa University in 2001. His use of vivid, cheerful colors contrasted with the somber subject matter of his art focuses on modern environmental issues such as urbanization and the idea of human progress. Abebe's work reflects a variety of everyday experiences—the progression or regression of life—or interactions in politics, society, and technology; his inspiration and message to tackle such everyday issues through his art. Abebe paints with pure instincts and is very freehanded, allowing it to lead him through his art; this is where his emotions are most accurately conveyed to not only society but himself as a raw, organic piece of work.

Dawit Abebe established the Habesha Studio in Ethiopia in 2001, and he continues as an artist-in-residence there full-time. He has made a large sum of sales from the studio. Some of his famous pieces such as "Mutual Identity", "Background 1", "Background 2", and "X Privacy" brought more awareness to contemporary art and struck his audience with their complexities and expression.

He collaborated with the charitable organization United Nations International Children's Emergency Fund (UNICEF) to provide workshops for poor children in Arba Minch, Jinka, and Addis Ababa.

== Exhibitions ==
Solo Exhibitions:

- ‘EDIT’, Kristin Hjellegjerde Gallery, London (2020)
- Mutual Identity, Addis Fine Art Gallery, Addis Ababa (2018)
- Liminal in the age of Mobile-ty, 68 Projects, Berlin (2018)
- “Quo Vadis?”, Kristin Hjellegjerde Gallery, London (2017)
- Background 2, Kristin Hjellegjerde Gallery, London (2015)
- Background 1, Lela Gallery, Addis Ababa (2014)
- X Privacy, Alliance Ethio-Française, Addis Ababa (2012)

Group exhibitions:

- Karachi Biennial (2019)
- 1:54 Contemporary African Arts Fair, London (2019)
- Kubatana, Vestfossen Kunskaboratorium, Norway (2019)
- 1:54 Contemporary African Arts Fair, London (2018)
- Background 1, Lela Gallery, Addis Ababa (2014)
- X Privacy, Alliance Ethio-Française, Addis Ababa (2012)
- Imago Mundi, Trieste, at Salone degli Incanti, Italy (2018)
- VOLTA13, Markthalle, Basel (2017)
- Everything Exists Now, Kristin Hjellegjerde Gallery, London (2017)
- Art Dubai, with Kristin Hjellegjerde Gallery, Dubai (2017)
