= Wolaita Dicha Volleyball Club =

Volleyball team from Ethiopia

- Short name: Wolaita Dicha VC
- Nickname: Bees of Tona
- Founded: 2009
- Ground: Sodo Stadium
- League: Ethiopia Men's Volleyball Premier League
- Website: Club home page

Wolaita Dicha Volleyball Club or in short Wolaita Dicha VC is a volleyball team from Ethiopia, based in Sodo. It is the member of Ethiopian Volleyball Federation. The club was founded in 2009. Wolaita Dicha VC plays their home games in the Wolaita Sodo Stadium.

== Titles Won ==
Wolaita Dicha is a team that is representing Ethiopia in the African champions' winning competition, having repeatedly lifted the domestic Cup of the Year. In 2017 league competition Wolaita Dicha Volleyball club became champion of Ethiopian men's volleyball premier league. In 2022 season of Ethiopian volleyball premier league, which was held between 7 clubs Wolaita dicha VC won the league title by having 32 points. Following this result, the club confirmed it would take part in next year's African volleyball tournament.

== See also ==
- Wolaitta Dicha S.C.
- Wolaita Dicha U-20 F.C.
