= Wolaita Liqa School =

School in Wolaita, South Ethiopia Regional State, Ethiopia

- ወላይታ ሊቃ ትምህርት ቤት; Wolaytta Liqaa Luxetta Keettaa (Wolaytta)
- Wolayita Zone; Wolaita Sodo

Information
- Mottoes: Center of Excellence
- Established: 2000
- Founder: Wolaita Development Association
- Director: Barok Baytale
- Language: English
- Website: wolaitaliqaschool.org

Wolaita Liqa School is a school in Ethiopia based in Wolaita Sodo. The school is a recognized community model school in the community. Wolaita Liqa School was established by the Wolaita Development Association in Sodo Town in 2000, funded by Japan's grant-in-aid for grassroots human security projects. After a while, the school was expanded to provide secondary education. Wolaita Liqa School is the leading school in the SNNPR with a prominent record in the national exam. The school has its own vision and mission, that is to produce talented and creative students and to advocate and spread the value of education among those who are deprived of it.

== School facilities ==
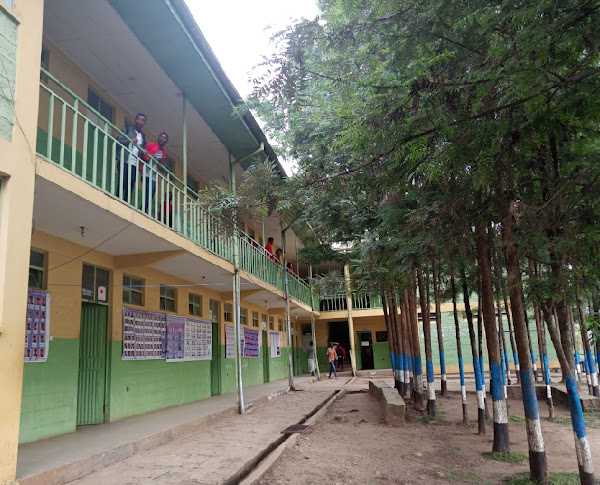
Wolaita Liqa School classes

The Teaching & Learning of the school is modeled in activity-based learning (ABL) by employing ICT, Science Laboratories & STEM center. Wolaitta Liqa School also provides boarding service for both WODA beneficiary & Cost sharing students. The school has many students who graduated from domestic and international colleges & Universities, organized into alumni groups.
