= Alfred Ilg =

Swiss engineer

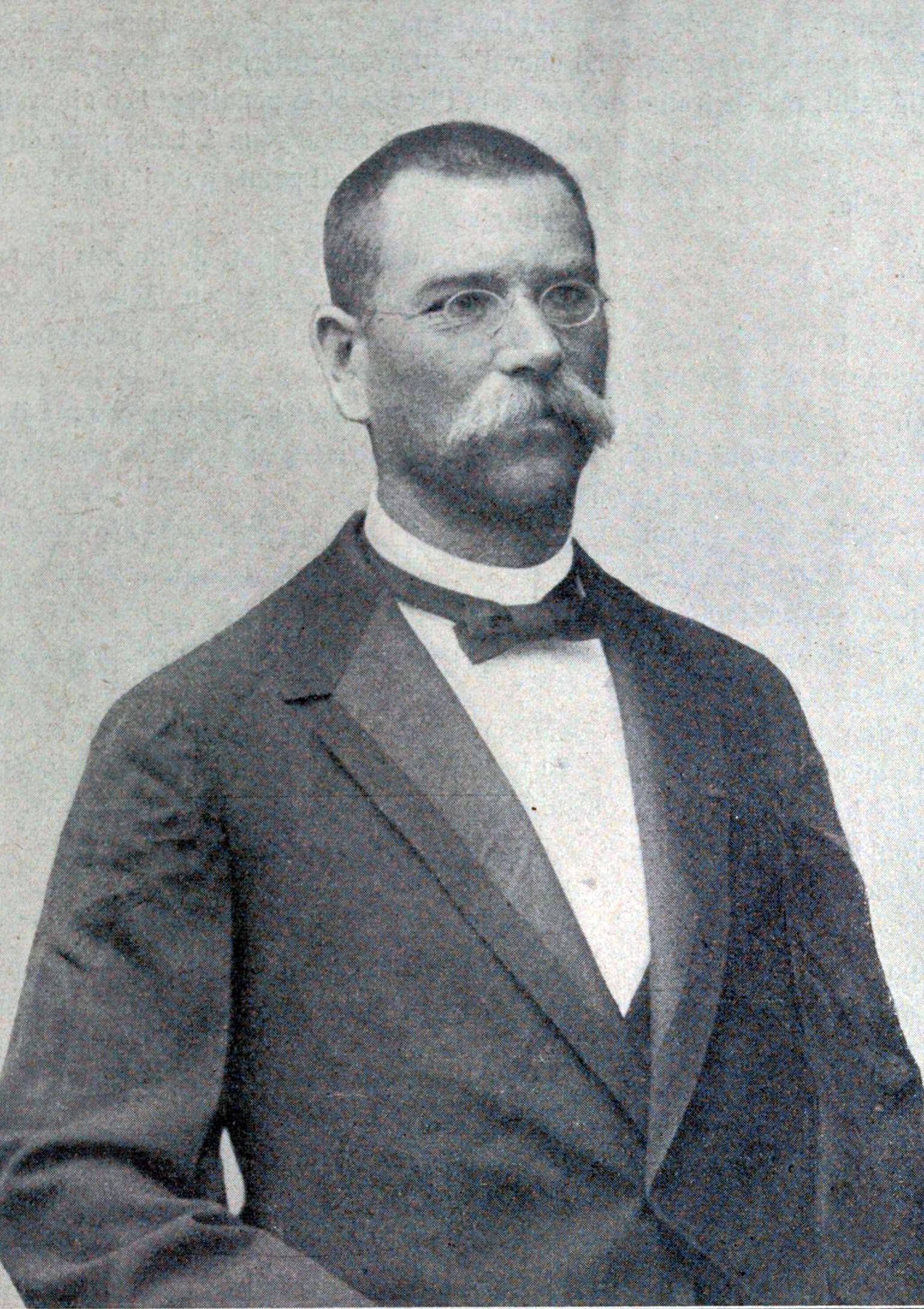

Alfred Heinrich Ilg (30 March 1854 – 7 January 1916) was a Swiss engineer and First Minister of State to Ethiopian Emperor Menelik II. He was born in Frauenfeld, Switzerland and died in Zurich.

== Early life ==
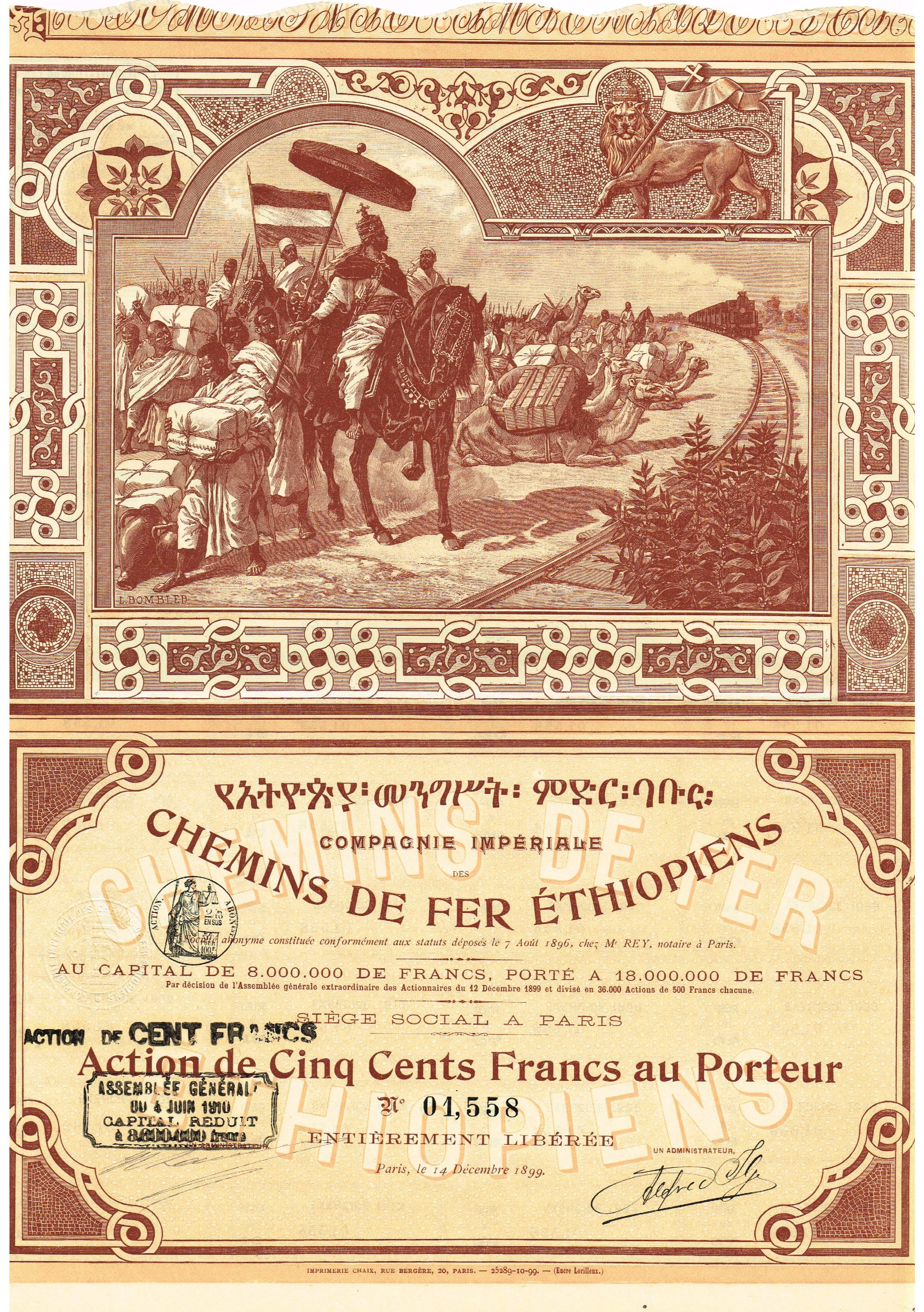
Share of the Compagnie Impériale des Chemins de Fer Éthiopiens, issued 14. December 1899, signed by Alfred Ilg; The share shows emperor Menelik II, waiting together with his royal suit for the arrival of the first train.

In 1854, Ilg was born into a poor household in Frauenfeld. After his stepfather died, he began to train as a mechanic. Later he studied to become an engineer at the Federal Institute of Technology in Zürich. He was not interested in a career in Switzerland, preferring a foreign country, and he soon became aware of a job in Abyssinia. Menelik II was inspired in hiring Alfred Ilg by the technical development Sudan made with help of the Swiss General Governor Werner Munzinger. Menelik preferred a Swiss technician, not one of a colonial power who he did not trust. The Swiss merchants of Furrer & Escher served as intermediaries between the two and in May 1878 Ilg left Zurich for Aden (present day Yemen). After having crossed the Red Sea on the African continent, he was detained four months in Zeila, Somalia. After his release, he traveled with camel forty-five days until he reached Ankober on the 1 January 1879.

== In Ethiopia ==
He received a warm welcome by Melinek II who at the time was the King of Shewa. Ilg soon learned Amharic, and was involved in all sorts of technical issues. He built houses and waterworks or was involved in the construction of Addis Ababa. A major work of his was the construction of a bridge over the river Awash in 1886. He was also entrusted with diplomatic missions to Europe and managed to get hold of a factory for ammunition production, which gave Menelik greater independence from the colonial powers. Following this, Menelik expanded his territory defeating the tribes to the east and southwards and after the Ethiopian Emperor Yohannes IV died in 1889, he became his successor. In 1889, Ethiopia and Italy agreed on the Treaty of Wuchale which made them friends and allies and in which Italy assured to refrain from expanding into Ethiopian territory. However, a slight distinction was made, in which Art. 17 of the Amharic version ensured Ethiopian sovereignty, while the Italian one made Ethiopia into an Italian protectorate. According to Helmut Stadler, this was pointed out to the Ethiopians by Alfred Ilg, who then sent him to Europe and inquire on the position of the other European powers. Ilg advised Menelik to prepare for war, when he learned Italy was planning an expedition into Ethiopia, attempting to force it to accept a status of Italian protectorate. In 1896, the Ethiopian army defeated the Italians at the Battle of Adwa and Italy acknowledged Ethiopian sovereignty in the Treaty of Addis Ababa.

Menelik II rewarded Ilg with the title counselor in the range of an excellency in 1897 and, furthermore, named him minister of foreign affairs for the years 1897 to 1907. He showed his competence as an engineer when planning and implementing the railway line from Djibouti to the capital. He was also responsible for supervising the design and construction of the first piped water supply to the capital and for installing electrical power in the imperial palace in 1905. Ilg was leading in the construction of several public buildings and worked as chef de protocole and secretary for the emperor, receiving the highest medal available, the Star of Ethiopia. Ilg married twice in Ethiopia, first to an Ethiopian woman named Walatta Maryam from Bulga, with whom he had four children before she died. After her death, he married a Swiss woman named Fanny Gattiker from Zurich in 1895, with whom he had four more children including a son named Menelik.

Further achievements worth mentioning are the creation of a unified national currency system and the erection of a postal system. When Friedrich Rosen, an orientalist and leader of an official German delegation established several treaties between Ethiopia and Germany on 7 March 1905, Ilg's influence at court began to dwindle. He could not (or did not want to) do anything against several intrigues at court; which led to his resignation in 1907.

=== Later life ===
Alfred Ilg returned to Switzerland and settled in Zürich where he died at the age of 61.

Ilg was a contemporary of the French poet Arthur Rimbaud, and was a frequent correspondent of him.

== Exhibitions ==
His collection of 300 Ethiopian artifacts which included pottery, weaponry or musical instruments was displayed in a variety of Swiss localities in 1891 and 1892. In 2003 it was again exhibited in the Ethnographic Museum in Zürich.

== Bibliography ==
- Elisabeth Biasio: Prunk und Pracht am Hofe Menilek, Verl. NZZ, Zürich, 2004, ISBN 3-03823-089-8
- Conrad Keller: Alfred Ilg, sein Leben und sein Wirken als schweizerischer Kulturbote in Abessinien, Huber, Frauenfeld, 1918
- Heribert Küng: Staatsminister Alfred Ilg (1854–1916), ein Thurgauer am Hof Kaiser Menelik II. von Äthiopien, Thesis-Verl., Zürich, 1999, ISBN 3-908544-34-3
- Willi Loepfe: Alfred Ilg und die äthiopische Eisenbahn, Atlantis-Verl., Zürich, 1974, ISBN 3-7611-0446-4
- Bairu Tafla (Hrsg.): Ethiopian records of the Menelik era, Harrassowitz, Wiesbaden, 2000, ISBN 3-447-04258-3
- Hugues Fontaine: Un Train en Afrique. African Train. Centre Français des Études Éthiopiennes / Shama Books. Édition bilingue français / anglais. Traduction : Yves-Marie Stranger. Postface : Jean-Christophe Belliard. Avec des photographies de Matthieu Germain Lambert et Pierre Javelot. Addis Abeba, 2012, ISBN 978-99944-867-1-7.

== Films ==
- Alfred Ilg - Der weiße Abessinier a film by Christoph Kühn (Switzerland, 2003)
