= Boditi City FC =

Association football club in Ethiopia

Boditi City
- Full name: Boditi City Football Club ቦዲቲ ከተማ እግር ኳስ ክለብ
- Nickname: ዳታዎቹ
- Ground: Boditi Stadium; Boditi
- Capacity: 15,000
- League: Ethiopian Higher League
Home colours

Boditi City Football Club (Amharic: ቦዲቲ ከተማ እግር ኳስ ክለብ) is a professional Ethiopian football club based in Boditi. They are a member of the Ethiopian Football Federation and play in the Ethiopian Higher League, the second division of Ethiopian football.

== History ==
Earlier in 2019, Boditi City Football Club, which represented Wolayita Zone in the Southern Nations, Nationalities, and Peoples' Region (SNNPR) Championship in Jinka, ended its season with a victory. Meanwhile, the Boditi City Football Team has once again represented Wolayita Zone in the All Ethiopian Football Clubs' Championship held in Hawassa. It is the Boditi football club that made history by participating in the Southern Clubs Championship and defeating the rival Wendo Genet City 3–0.

== Stadium ==
The club plays its home matches at Boditi Stadium in Boditi, Ethiopia.
