= Wolaita Sodo City FC =

Association football club in Ethiopia

Sodo City S.C.
- Full name: Wolaita Sodo City Sport Club ዎላይታ ሶዶ ከነማ
- Nicknames: Motolomis ሞቶሎሚዮቹ
- Founded: 2011; 14 years ago
- Ground: Sodo Stadium; Wolaita Sodo, Ethiopia
- Capacity: 15,000
- League: Ethiopian Higher League
Home colours	Away colours

Wolaita Sodo City Sport Club (Amharic: ዎላይታ ሶዶ ከነማ እግር ኳስ ክለብ) or in short Sodo City Sport Club is an Ethiopian football club based in Wolaita Sodo.Sodo City S.C. was officially established in 2011. The club is a member of the Ethiopian Football Federation and plays in the Ethiopian Higher League, the second order professional football competition in Ethiopia. Sodo City S.C. is one of the leading clubs in Wolayita Zone, which is known for recruiting young football players.

== History ==
In 2021/22 season the club board solved the financial problems in the club, which created the survival of the club in the league in question. They worked in adjusting the goal to transforming re-recruiting new players from youth project. After the problem solved the team has battled in the second round, and this helped the club to survive in the Ethiopian Higher League.

== Stadium ==
Wolaita Sodo City Football club Uses Sodo Stadium which is located in Wolaita Sodo, Ethiopia for its home matches.
