= Woba Ari =

District in South Ethiopia Regional State

Woba Ari: ዎባ አሪ ወረዳ (Amharic)
- Woreda
- Country: Ethiopia
- Region: South Ethiopia Regional State
- Zone: Ari Zone
- Seat: Boyka

Population (2020)
  - Total: 66,466
  - Urban: 2,846
  - Rural: 63,620
- Time zone: UTC+3 (EAT)

Woba Ari is woreda located in Ari Zone of the South Ethiopia Regional State, Ethiopia. Administratively, the woreda is divided into ten rural and one urban kebeles. The administrative center of this district is Boyka town.

== Demographics ==
The total population inhabited in this woreda is 66,466. From this 63,620 rural and 2,846 urban.
