= Awash rail disaster =

1985 railway disaster in Ethiopia

On 13 January 1985, an express train derailed on a curved bridge over the gorge of the Awash River in Awash, Ethiopia. The official death toll was 428, with more than 500 injuries.

== Accident ==
On 13 January 1985, an express train was travelling from Dire Dawa to Addis Ababa on the rail line from Djibouti. It was overcrowded with approximately 1,000 passengers. Crossing the curved 40 feet (12 m) bridge over the ravine at Awash, four of the train's carriages derailed, beginning with the rear carriage. All fell into the ravine.

Initial reports were that as many as 449 had been killed; Ethiopian radio later reported 428 deaths. More than 500 were said to have been injured.

The accident was the deadliest train crash in Africa, and was at the time the third-deadliest train accident worldwide.

== Cause ==
The Ethiopian Ministry of Transportation blamed the crash on excessive speed on the curve; the driver was arrested.
