= Legehar train station =

Main railway station in Addis Ababa, Ethiopia

Coordinates: 9°00′34″N 38°45′12″E

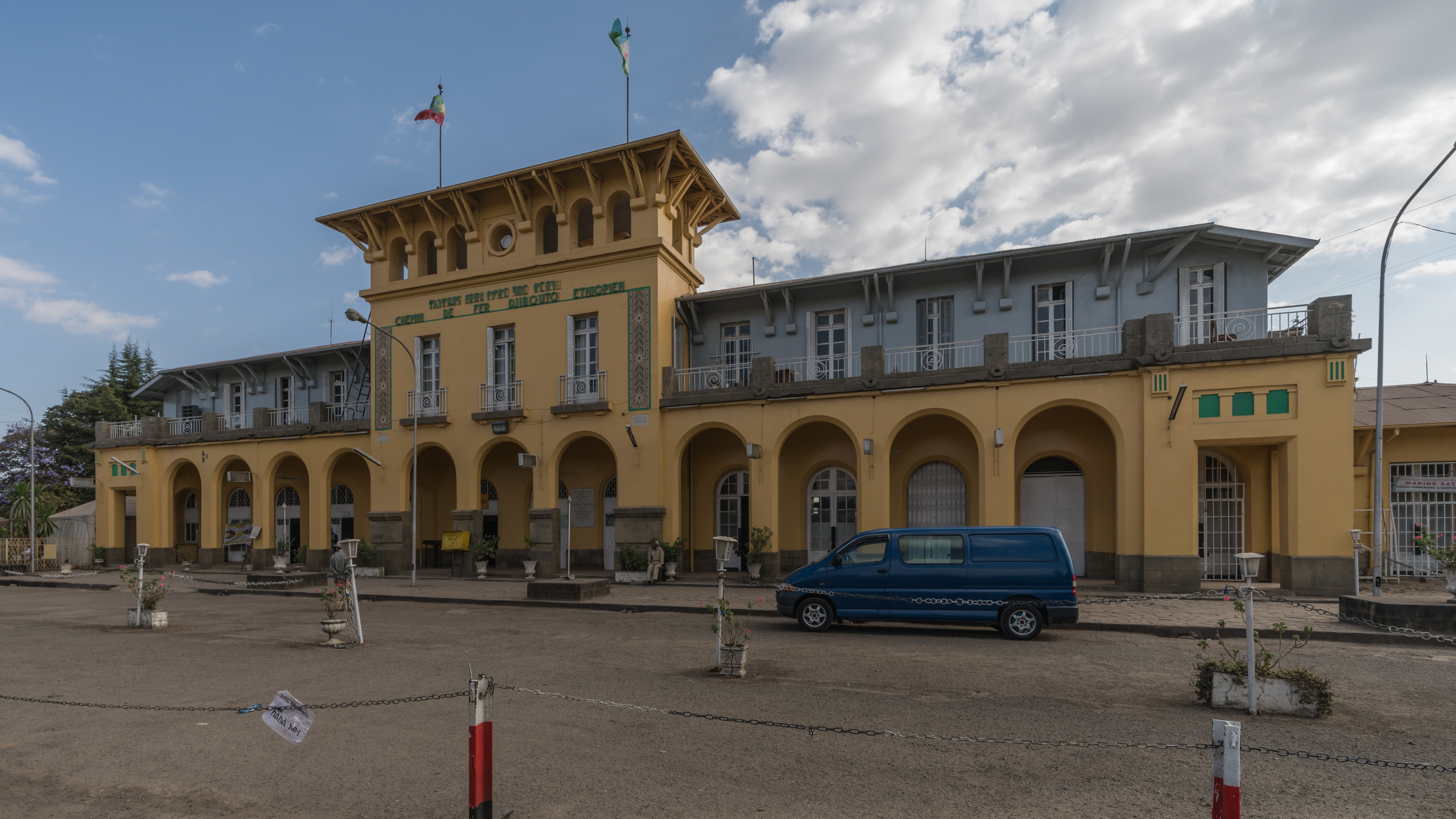
Legehar train station, front side

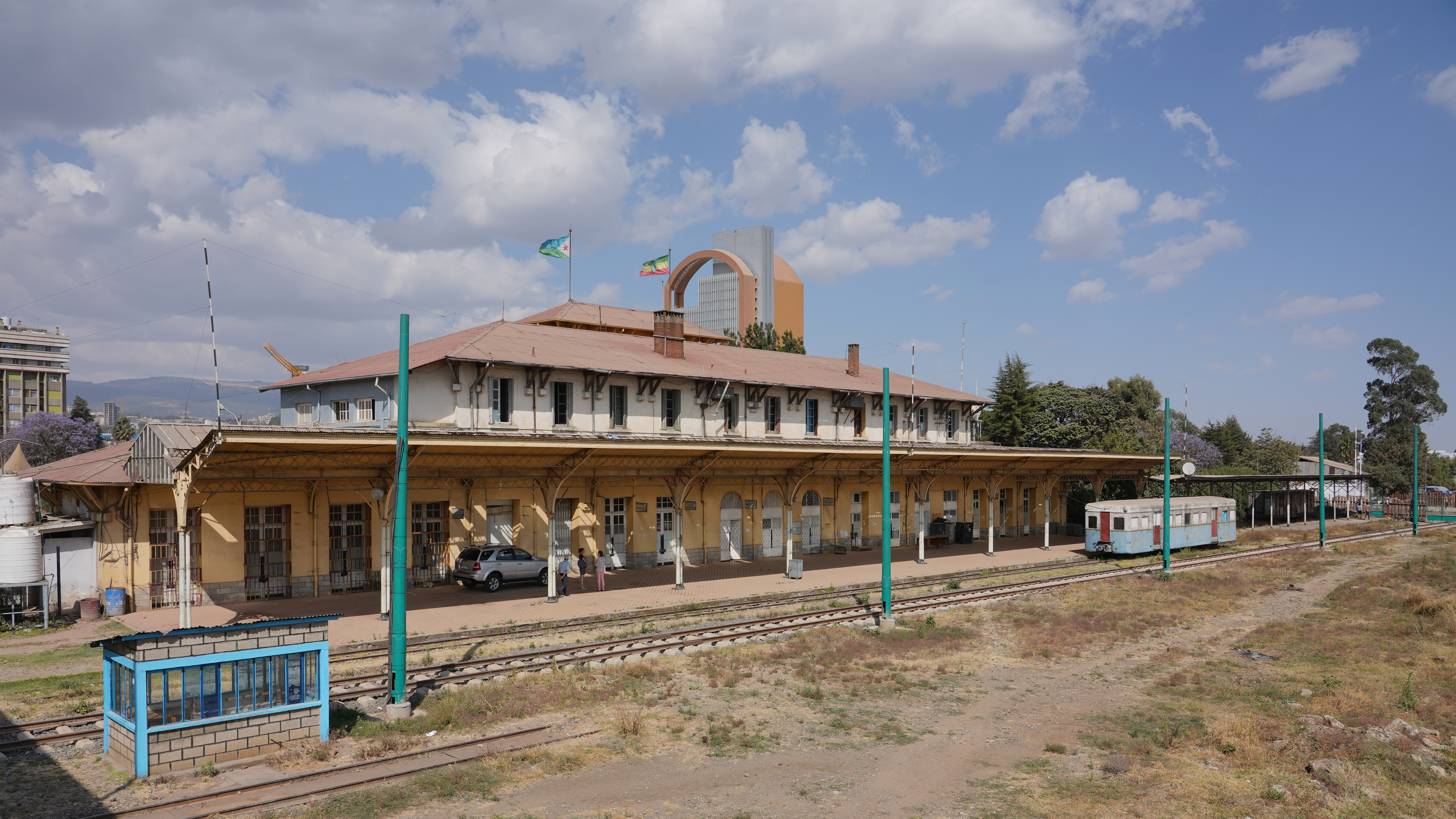
Track side

Legehar (from French: La Gare) was the main railway station in Addis Ababa, Ethiopia, the terminal station of the metre-gauge Ethio-Djibouti Railway that connected Ethiopia's capital to the Port of Djibouti. Completed in 1917, the station was a central part of the city and the main source of traffic into the city. The style of the station is French, reflecting the nationality of its builders. The station is no longer in operation, as the metre-gauge railway has been largely superseded by the standard-gauge Addis Ababa–Djibouti Railway completed in 2017. The standard-gauge station is located in the outskirts of Addis Ababa.
