= Debub Ari (woreda) =

- District
- Location within Ethiopia
- Country: Ethiopia

Debub Ari is a district of Southern Nations, Nationalities, and Peoples' Region in Ethiopia.

This is one of the 9 districts in the South Omo Zone. It is the nearest to the capital of the zone, Jinka. The capital of the woreda, Gazer, is 17 km away from Jinka.

The district has a total of 50 kebeles, and a total population of 168,225, which is about 35% of the zone population. The distance of these kebeles from Jinka town ranges from 4 to 83 km, with an average distance of 37 km. Of all kebeles, only 24 (48%) are accessible by car using dry weather roads. In this woreda, there is one indigenous ethnic community called Ari with its own language and culture. All the communities are settled farmers.

== See also ==
- Districts of Ethiopia
