= Areka City F.C. =

Association football club in Ethiopia

- Full name: Areka City Football Club አረካ ከነማ እግር ኳስ ክለብ
- Nickname(s): Twins መንትዮቹ
- Founded: (2000 E.C.)
- Ground: Areka Stadium; Areka, Ethiopia
- Capacity: 10,000
- League: Ethiopian First League
| Home colours | Away colours |

Areka City Football Club (Amharic: አረካ ከነማ እግር ኳስ ክለብ) is an Ethiopian club based in Areka. Areka City F.C. was officially established in 2000. They are a member of the Ethiopian Football Federation and play in the Ethiopian First League, the third division of Ethiopian football.

== Honors ==
In the 2021/22 Ethiopian First League, Areka F.C. was assigned to group C, in which the competition was completed on Friday, April 8, 2022, in Burayu. The team ended with a total of 37 points in the competition, and Areka F.C. triumphed in the Ethiopian first League's Group C.

== Stadium ==
The club plays its home matches at Areka Stadium in Areka, Ethiopia.
