= Léon Chefneux =

Léon Chefneux (15 January 1853 at Piatra Neamț, Romania – 31 May 1927 at Grasse, France) was a French explorer, businessman, and arms dealer.

== Biography ==
From 1877, he travelled to Ethiopia with Pierre Arnoux for the Franco-Ethiopian Commercial Society, and later with Paul Soleillet for the French Society.

In 1882, he set up in Shewa as an arms trader and became friends with Arthur Rimbaud. In 1885, he was in charge of delivering weapons to Négus Menelik and, together with Henry Audon, traversed Dankali and Choa, where they met Paul Soleillet. After a hunting accident, Audon was injured and had to have a limb amputated.

Upon learning of the massacre of the explorer Léon Barral and his wife on 24 February 1886, he went to the sources of Amoïssa and found the unrecognisable bodies, which had been devoured by hyenas and birds of prey. He found the expedition's rifles and baggage.

He was the manager of the Lake Assal Society (1896–1897), having received the concession in 1887, and in 1896 he founded, with Alfred Ilg, the Imperial Company of Ethiopian Railways. As Ethiopia's consul general, Léon Chefneux was involved in establishing the railway between Djibouti and Addis Ababa.

Chefneux left Ethiopia and returned to France in 1922, and he died in Grasse in 1927.

== Bibliography ==
David H. Shinn, Thomas P. Ofcansky, Historical Dictionary of Ethiopia, 2013, p. 386
