= Semen Ari (woreda) =

District in Southern Nations, Nationalities and People's Region, Ethiopia

- Woreda
- Location within Ethiopia
- Country: Ethiopia

Semen Ari is a woreda in Southern Nations, Nationalities, and Peoples' Region in Ethiopia.

== See also ==
- Districts of Ethiopia
