= Gofa =

Gofa may refer to:

- Gofa people of Ethiopia
- Gofa language
- Gofa Zone, named after them
