= Wolaitta Dicha SC =

Association football club in Ethiopia

Wolaitta Dicha
- Full name: Wolaitta Dicha Sport Club
- Nickname: The Bees of Tona
- Founded: 2009; 17 years ago
- Ground: Wolaita Sodo Stadium; Wolaita Sodo, Ethiopia
- Capacity: 30,000
- Chairman: Asefa Osisa
- League: Ethiopian Premier League
- 2025–26: 7th
- Website: http://wolaittadsc.org/
Home colours	Away colours	Third colours

Wolaitta Dicha Sport Club (Amharic: ወላይታ ድቻ ስፖርት ክለብ, Wolayttatto Doonaa: Wolaytta Dichaa Ispporttiyaa Citaa) is a professional football club based in Sodo, Ethiopia. They play in the Ethiopian Premier League, the top division of Ethiopian football.

== History ==
=== Establishment ===
The club was established in 2009 by the Welayta Development Association. The club is partly funded by local government. They are the champions of the 2017 Ethiopian Cup. After being established by the Wolaitta Development Association in 2009, the club was promoted several times until they finally entered the top division in the 2013–14 season.

=== Domestic and African success (2013–present) ===
The club has enjoyed moderate success in the top division avoiding relegation in each of the last 4 seasons. In the 2016–2017 season the club had its most successful run in the Ethiopian Cup, winning the trophy for the first time in its short history. The current coach Zenebe Fisseha was hired in November 2017.

By virtue of winning its first domestic cup in 2017, the club qualified for the 2018 CAF Confederation Cup. In the first round of the competition Wolaitta Dicha were matched up against Tanzanian side Zimamoto F.C. The first leg ended in a draw in Tanzania, but on the return leg they were able to get a narrow 1–0 victory in front of a home crowd in Hawassa helping them win 2–1 on aggregate and advance to the round of 16. In the round 16 they were drawn against Egyptian giants Zemalek SC, five times former champions of Africa. First leg saw Wolaitta Dicha edged out Zamalek in a hard-fought 2–1 win at Hawassa Stadium in Ethiopia. The return leg at El Salam stadium in Cairo ended 2–1 in regulation in the favor of Zemalek making the teams level on aggregate (2–2) and leading to a penalty shootout. The underdog Wolaitta Dicha side eventually went on to win on penalties 4–3, eliminating Zemalek in the process and producing one of the biggest shocks in the competition's history. They were eliminated in the next round of the tournament by Tanzanian side Young African S.C. 2–1 on aggregate.

In January 2021, Dellegn Dechassa was sacked as head coach after a poor start to the season.

== Name and logo ==
The team name is from two words in the Wolaytta language ("Wolaitta" = the name of the ethnic group and "Dicha" = development. Literally meaning, development of Wolaitta or the team runs the development of Wolaitta.

The Wolaitta Dicha Club logo is a blue badge with a soccer ball at its center and the traditional Wolaitta colors of black, red and yellow running as a stripe through the bottom third of the badge. The badge also shows an enset, a typical leafy plant native to the SNNPR and very common in Wolayita Zone.

== Stadium ==
Currently the team plays at the Sodo Stadium. The team also uses Hawassa International Stadium in the city of Hawassa, Ethiopia especially during continental competitions like during the 2018 CAF Confederations Cup. In October 2018 the team announced that Soddo Stadium would undergo renovations during the 2018–19 season requiring the team to use another stadium, Bodeti, during part of the season.

== Support ==
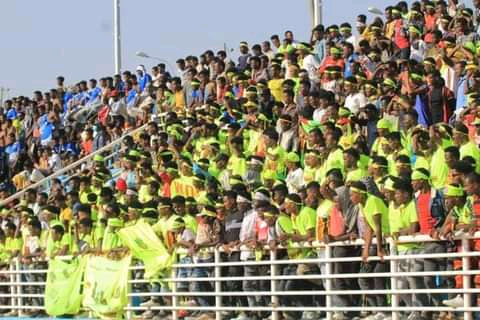
Dicha fans

Wolaitta Dicha fans are distinguished by their fervent display of Wolaitta culture through cultural clothing and dance. Fans often wear intricately designed black, yellow and red colored scarves made by the Wolaitta people and dance in the traditional styles of the Wolaitta people as well. The players on the team often feed on this energy before and after matches with some dancing along with the fans as they enter and leave the stadium.

== Departments ==
Wolaita Dicha SC has different sporting departments, such as Wolaita Dicha Volleyball team and Wolaita Dicha U-20 Football team. In 2021 the U20 team was disbanded due to budgetary constraints on the club. However, it was returned to the league competition for 2021/22 tournament.

== Honors ==
=== Honours ===
Wolaita Dicha S.C. honours
Type	Competition	Titles	Seasons
Ethiopian Cup	Domestic	2	2017, 2025

=== African ===
- CAF Confederation Cup: 1 appearance

2018 – Group stage

== Players ==
=== First-team squad ===
As of 25 July 2023 Note: Flags indicate national team as defined under FIFA eligibility rules; some limited exceptions apply. Players may hold more than one non-FIFA nationality.

No.	Pos.	Nation	Player
1	GK	ETH	Biniam Genetu
30	GK	ETH	Wondesen Ashenafi
31	GK	ETH	Endashawu Eshetu
13	GK	ETH	Abinet Yishak
16	DF	ETH	Anagew Badeg
2	DF	ETH	Abinet Demisse
27	DF	ETH	Yonatan Elias
18	DF	ETH	Fitsum Girma
5	DF	ETH	Kennedy Kebede
26	DF	ETH	Anteneh Gugsa (captain)
44	DF	ETH	Natinael Nasero
4	MF	ETH	Tsegaye Birhanu
24	MF	ETH	Azarias Abel
19	MF	ETH	Abebayehu Hajiso
22	MF	ETH	Asnake Amtatew

No.	Pos.	Nation	Player
15	MF	ETH	Melkamu Bogale
6	MF	ETH	Samuel Jagiso
28	MF	ETH	Kidus Kirkos
37	MF	ETH	Daniel Mulukun
14	MF	ETH	Mesay Nikola
8	MF	ETH	Indris Seid
12	MF	ETH	Bizuayehu Seid
21	MF	ETH	Eyob Tesfaye
4	MF	ETH	Tsegaye Balcha
10	FW	ETH	Biniam Fikre
7	FW	ETH	Bisrat Bekele
23	FW	ETH	Natan Gashaw
9	FW	ETH	Baye Gezahegn
11	FW	ETH	Fikadu Mekonin
17	FW	ETH	Zelalem Abate

== Club officials ==
General Manager: (Ethiopia) Wondimu Samuel Herano

Technical Director: (Ethiopia) ...

Fan Union President: (Ethiopia) Mikael Wadan

=== Coaching and medical staff ===
Head coach: (Ethiopia) Tsegaye Kidane-mariyam

Assistant coach: (Ethiopia) Tassew Tadesse

Goalkeeper coach: (Ethiopia) Zelalem Mathiwos Ade

Medical BSC : (Ethiopia) Abera Mena Aga

Condemnation : (Ethiopia) Barka Bakalo Badacho

== Former players ==
The following are some of the players who have played for Wolaita Dicha in the past and have played and currently playing for their national team.

- Mubarek Shikur
- Chernet Gugesa

== See also ==
- Wolaita Dicha U-20 F.C.
- Wolaita Dicha Volleyball Club
