= Bule Hora (town) =

Town in Oromia Region, Ethiopia

Bule Hora Bulee Horaa (Oromo) ሀገረ ማርያም (Amharic)
- Town
- Location within Ethiopia Bule Hora (Africa)
- Coordinates: 5°35′N 38°15′E
- Country: Ethiopia
- Region: (Oromia Region) Oromia
- Zone: West Guji

Population (2022)
  - Total: 57,700
  - Rank: 15th in Ethiopia
- Time zone: UTC+3 (EAT)

Bule Hora (Oromo: Bulee Horaa; Amharic: ሀገረ ማርያም) is a town in southern Oromia Region, Ethiopia. Located on the paved Addis Ababa-Moyale highway, in the West Guji Zone, it is the largest town in this zone mainly inhabited by the Guji Oromo. It has a latitude and longitude of 5°35′N 38°15′E and an altitude of 1716 meters above sea level.

== History ==
An orthodox church dedicated to Mary (Mariam) was built in the early 1900. Bule Hora name changed Hagere Mariam and introduced by the Amhara sometimes before 1934. In 1936 Kenyazmach Tekle Giyorgis, a nephew of Ras Desta Damtew, was the chief of the town. It was occupied by the Italians on 22 July 1936, who renamed it "Alghe". They rebuilt the village and constructed a fort nearby; the Italians also bestowed honors and powers to a local Guji chief.

In the following decades, Bule Hora became isolated: a group of Swedish missionaries traveling to the Burji in March 1950 brought the first motorized vehicles seen in the town since the Italian occupation. A Norwegian Evangelical Mission was established at Hagere Mariam on 15 August of the same year, with the goal of reaching the Guji. Its founding leader was Karl Bogetvedt who worked from a little rented house inside the town, with dwelling, school and clinic in the same building. The mission station in Hagere Mariam continued into the 1980s. Guji zone is known by Geda System, which is thought to be source of democracy.

== Demographics ==
Bule Hora is the largest town in West Guji Zone.

The 2007 national census reported a total population of 27,820 for Bule Hora Town, of whom 14,519 were men and 13,301 were women. 6,507 households and 6,246 housing units were counted. The town was divided into three urban Araddaa.

Based on figures from the Central Statistical Agency in 2005, Bule Hora had an estimated total population of 22,784 of whom 12,046 were men and 10,738 were women.

The 1994 national census reported this town had a total population of 12,718 of whom 6,533 were males and 6,185 were females. In 1984 there were 1984 7,300 inhabitants in the town, in 1967 3,707 inhabitants were counted.

== Bule Hora University ==
The foundation stone of Bule Hora University was laid on 28 November 2008. The university was officially established by proclamation No 213/2011 (213/2003 E.C) as one of the Ethiopian government higher education institutions.

Since the construction of Bule Hora University was delayed beyond its expected completion time, the university started functioning in the campus of Bule Hora College of Teacher Education in the 2011/12 academic year, and transferred to its own campus in September 2012.

Currently, Bule Hora University has 206 programs (104 undergraduates, 81 Masters and 21 PhD), with 1153 academic staff and 3239 admin staff, under eight colleges, one school and one institute.
