= Dukem =

Town in central Oromia Region, Ethiopia

Dukem Duukam (Oromo)
- Town
- Location within Ethiopia Dukem (Africa)
- Coordinates: 08°48′N 38°54′E
- Country: Ethiopia
- Region: Oromia
- Zone: Oromia Special Zone
- Time zone: UTC+3 (EAT)

Dukem (var. Dukam, Duukam; Oromo: Duukam) is one of the three sub cities in Bishoftu city Oromia Region, Ethiopia. Dukem has a latitude and longitude of 08°48′N 38°54′E and an elevation of 1950 meters above sea level. It is the administrative center of Akaki woreda.

Dukem is situated along the Addis Ababa–Adama Expressway and is a station on the Ethio-Djibouti Railway. It is also the location of an industrial park covering 40 hectares owned and developed by East African Group (Ethiopia), Ltd.

Based on figures from the Central Statistical Agency in 2005, Dukem has an estimated total population of 8,704 of whom 4,095 are men and 4,609 are women.
