= Jinka =

Town in South Ethiopia Regional State

Jinka ጂንካ
- Town
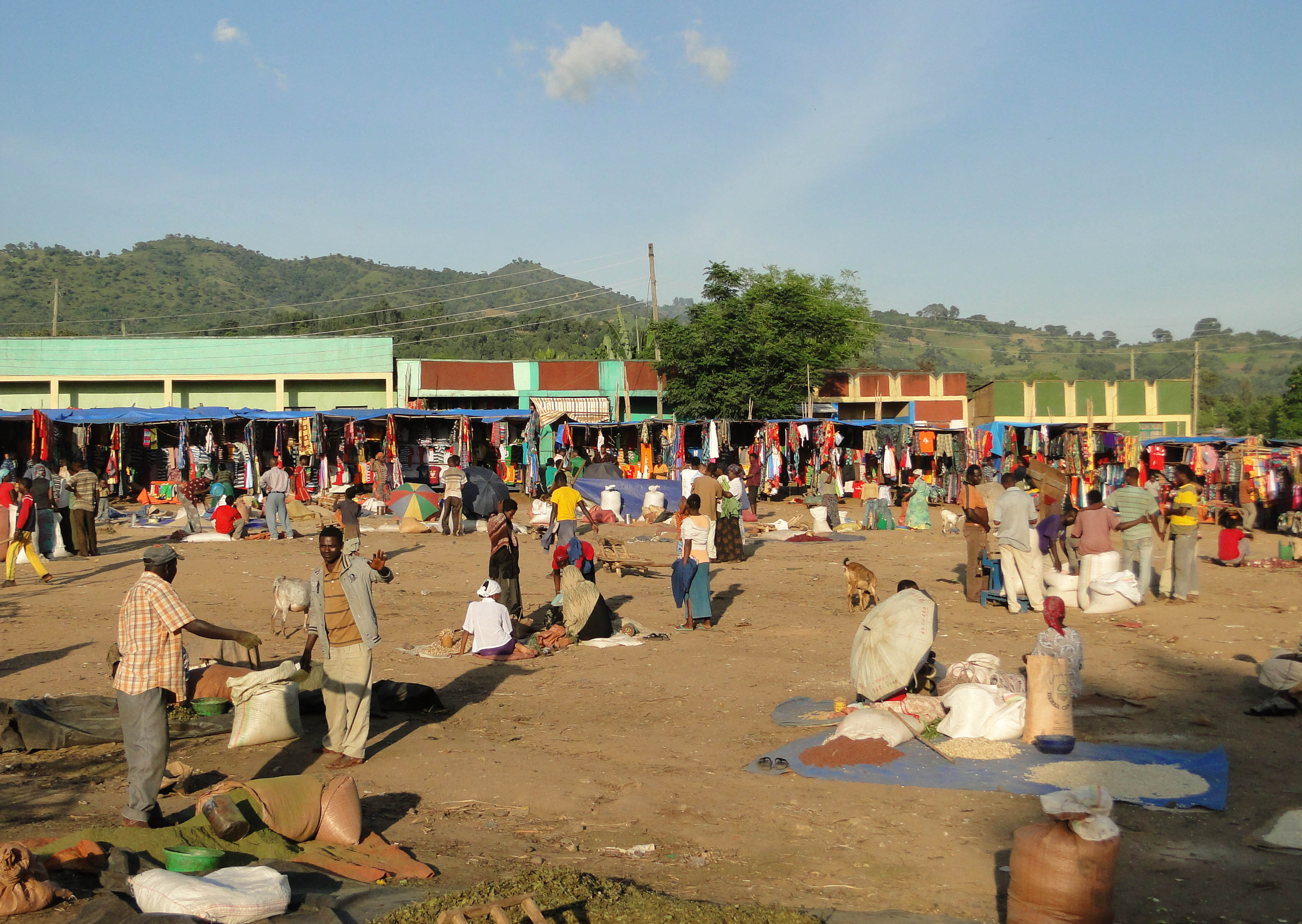
- Market in Jinka

- Location within Ethiopia
- Coordinates: 5°47′N 36°34′E
- Country: Ethiopia
- Region: South Ethiopia Regional State
- Zone: Ari Zone
- Elevation: 1,490 m (4,890 ft)

Population (2005)
  - Total: 30,249
- Time zone: UTC+3 (EAT)
  - Summer (DST): UTC+3 (not observed)
- Climate: Aw

Jinka (Amharic: ጂንካ) is a market town in southern Ethiopia. Located in the hills north of the Tama Plains, this town is the capital of the Ari Zone of the South Ethiopia Regional State. Currently Jinka is the center of Jinka town administration. Jinka has a latitude and longitude of 5°47′N 36°34′E and an elevation of 1490 meters above sea level. It is one of the most famous tourist destinations in the country. It is also an important center for at least sixteen indigenous ethnic groups as well as others from the rest of the country.

== Overview ==
Jinka is home to the German-funded South-Omo Museum and Research Center and an airstrip (IATA code BCO). Postal service is provided by a main branch; electricity and telephone service are also available. Its market day is Saturday. The Mago National Park, 40 kilometers south by unpaved road, is a nearby attraction.

The local clinic was reported in 1996 to be in the process of upgrading to hospital status, which would become the first in the south omo Zone. According to the SNNPR's Bureau of Finance and Economic Development, as of 2003 Jinka's amenities include digital telephone access, postal service, electricity provided by a diesel generator, a bank and a hospital. Jinka increased its electrical service from 16 to 24 hours a day in May 2009 when the town obtained additional generators.

== Demographics ==
Based on figures from the Central Statistical Agency in 2005, Jinka has an estimated total population of 22,475 of whom 11,774 are men and 10,701 are women. Previous population figures vary: the 1994 national census reported this town had a total population of 12,407 of whom 6,519 were men and 5,888 were women; another source states in 1993 there were a total of 9,520 inhabitants.

== Climate ==
Climate data for Jinka, elevation 1,430 m (4,690 ft), (1971–2000)
Month	Jan	Feb	Mar	Apr	May	Jun	Jul	Aug	Sep	Oct	Nov	Dec	Year
Mean daily maximum °C (°F)	29.7 (85.5)	30.0 (86.0)	29.8 (85.6)	26.8 (80.2)	25.5 (77.9)	24.7 (76.5)	24.3 (75.7)	24.7 (76.5)	25.4 (77.7)	26.0 (78.8)	26.9 (80.4)	29.0 (84.2)	26.9 (80.4)
Mean daily minimum °C (°F)	14.2 (57.6)	15.3 (59.5)	16.6 (61.9)	16.6 (61.9)	16.2 (61.2)	15.6 (60.1)	15.3 (59.5)	15.3 (59.5)	15.4 (59.7)	15.9 (60.6)	14.2 (57.6)	13.6 (56.5)	15.4 (59.6)
Average precipitation mm (inches)	47.0 (1.85)	71.0 (2.80)	107.0 (4.21)	178.0 (7.01)	167.0 (6.57)	107.0 (4.21)	94.0 (3.70)	120.0 (4.72)	130.0 (5.12)	169.0 (6.65)	126.0 (4.96)	29.0 (1.14)	1,345 (52.94)
Average relative humidity (%)	60	63	68	72	76	76	62	59	62	78	57	67	67
Source: FAO
