= Sodo Stadium =

Stadium in Wolaita, Ethiopia

- Full name: Wolaita Sodo Stadium
- Location: Sodo, Ethiopia
- Owner: Sodo City Administration
- Capacity: 30,000

Tenants
- Wolaitta Dicha SC; Sodo City FC; Ethiopia national football team (selected matches)

Sodo Stadium or Wolaita Sodo Stadium is a multi-use stadium located in Wolaita, Southern Ethiopia. It is primarily utilized for sporting events and acts as Wolaita Dicha and Wolaita Sodo City F.C.'s home stadium. In addition to hosting sport competition the stadium also used for organizing different mass conferences and holydays like Gifaataa. Wolaita Sodo Stadium can accommodate the maximum capacity for spectators watching a football match is 30,000.
