= Sodo =

Capital of South Ethiopia Regional State, Ethiopia

Wolaita Sodo Wolayttattuwa: Wolaytta Sooddo Amharic: ወላይታ ሶዶ
- Capital city
- Sodo
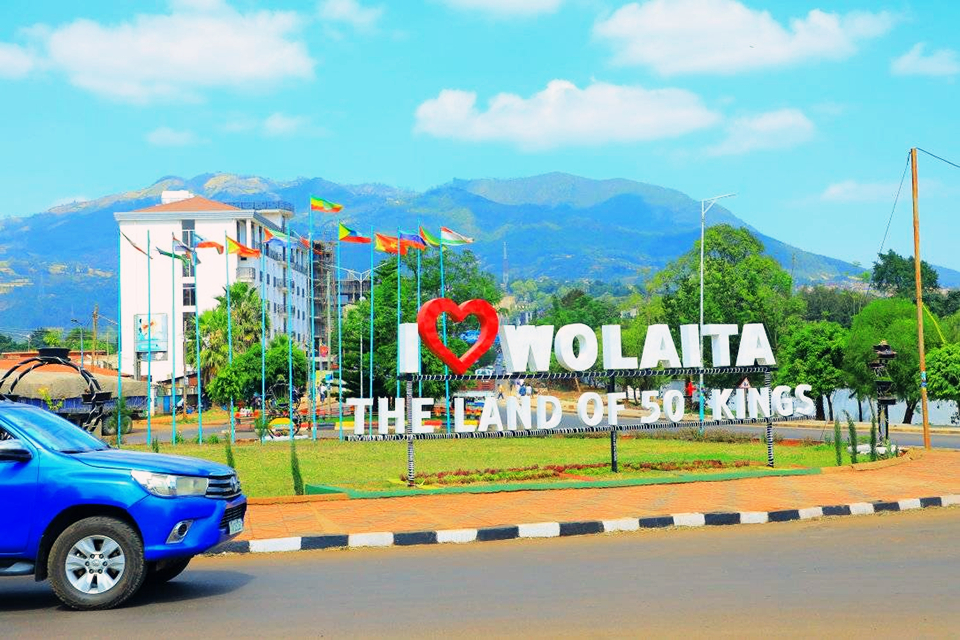
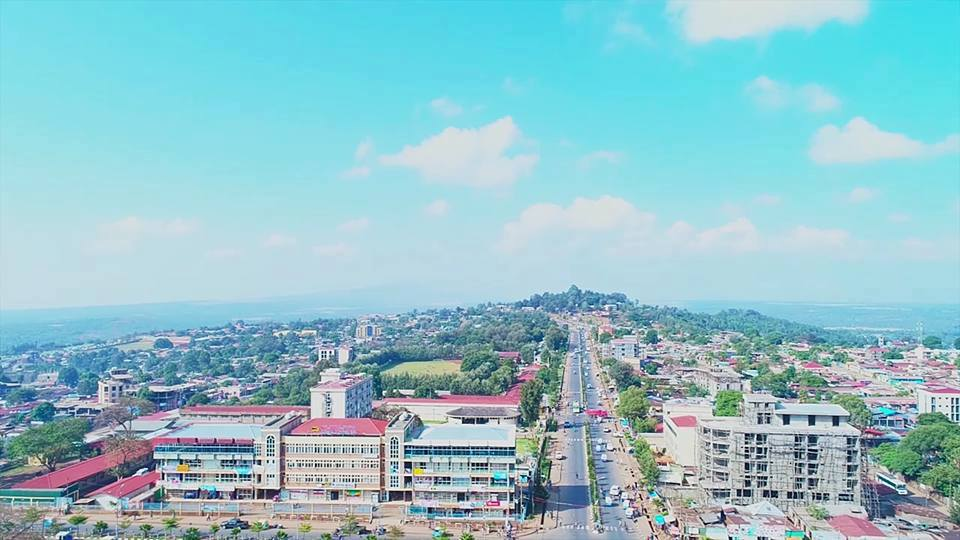
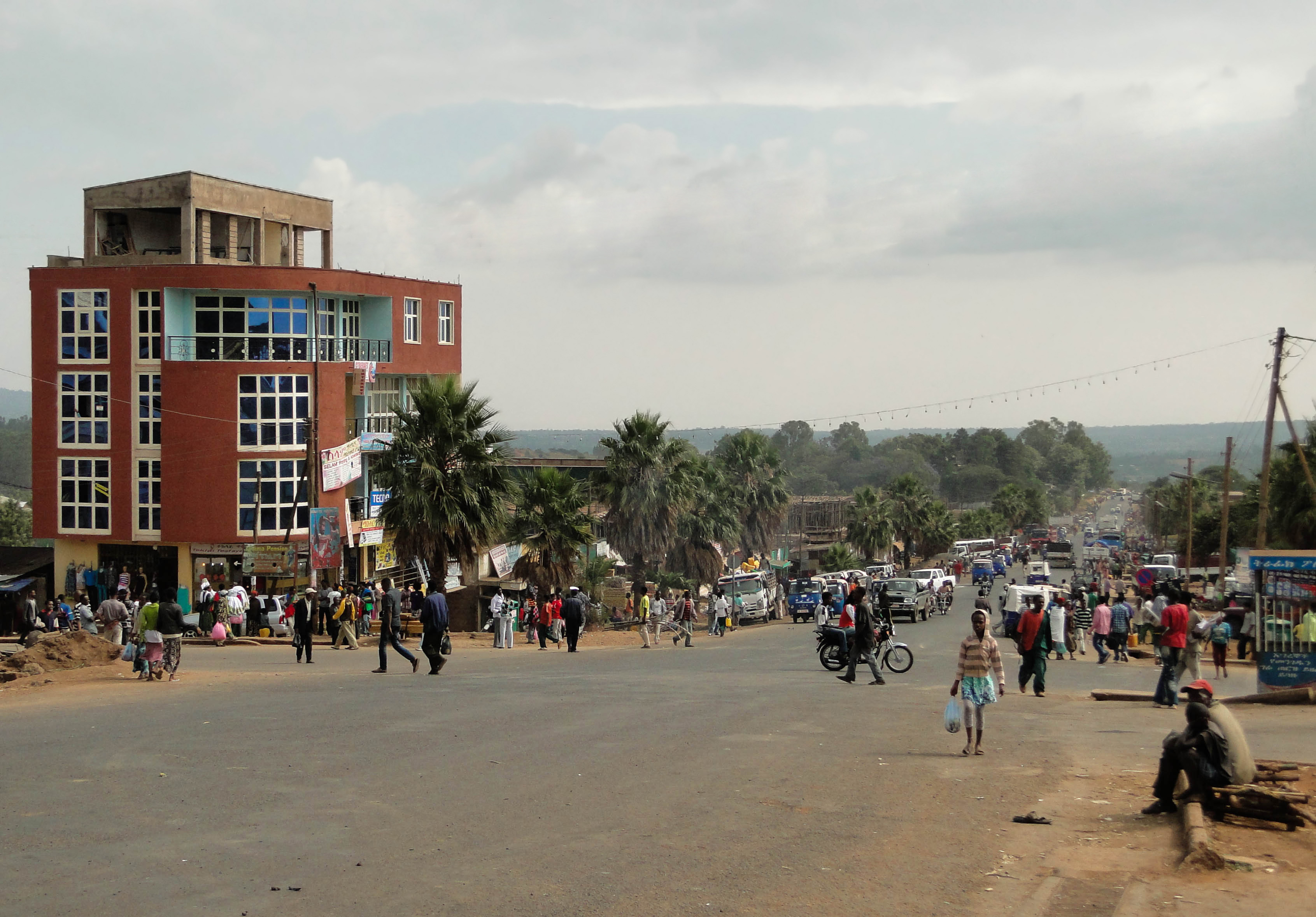
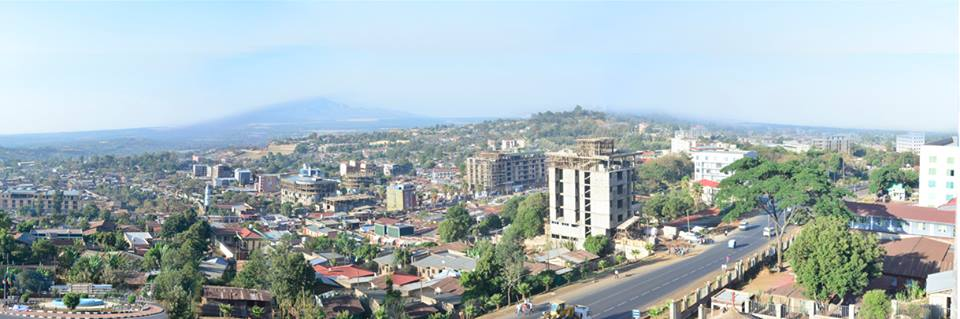
- From top: Wolayta Sodo city view, Tona Roundabout, Wolaita Sodo 2017, Street of Sodo, Sodo center view 2018
- Nickname: Land of King Motolomi
- Location within Wolayita Zone Location within Ethiopia Location within the Horn of Africa
- Coordinates: 6°51′18″N 37°46′51″E
- Country: Ethiopia
- Region: South Ethiopia Regional State
- Zone: Wolaita
- Sub cities: List: Arada; Dil Begerera; Fana Womba; Larena Amba; Mehal Amba; Merkato Yushuwa; Wadu Amba

Government
  - Mayor: Etagegn Hailemariam

Area
  - Total: 344 km^{2} (133 sq mi)
- Elevation: 1,600 m (5,200 ft)

Population (2024)
  - Total: 512,498
  - Density: 1,490/km^{2} (3,860/sq mi)
- Time zone: UTC+3 (EAT)
- ZIP Code: 4620
- Website: https://sodo.gov.et/

Sodo (Amharic: ሶዶ) or officially Wolaita Sodo (Amharic: ወላይታ ሶዶ, Wolaytta: Wolaytta Sooddo) is a city in south Ethiopia. The city is a political and administrative center of the Wolaita Zone and South Ethiopia Regional State. It has a latitude and longitude of 6°54′N 37°45′E with an elevation between 1,600 and 2,100 metres (5,200 and 6,900 feet) above sea level. It was part of the former Sodo woreda which included Sodo Zuria which completely surrounds it.

Sodo is a center of major health and education institutions in Ethiopia. Soddo Christian Hospital has one of the 10 surgical training centers in Africa. The hospital provides a full range of medical, and surgical services, including Orthopedic and General, Maternity, and Pediatrics. Wolaita Sodo University Teaching Referral Hospital is also located in this town and it serves around two million people. The total number of beds in the hospital was 200; out of which 60 beds were in Obstetrics and Gynecology department.

Sodo's amenities include digital and mobile telephone access, postal service, 24 hour electrical service, two banks, and a hospital. Sodo is also the seat of the Roman Catholic Apostolic Vicariate of Sodo-Hosaena.

== History ==
In the early 1930s, Sodo was described as the only locality in Wolaita district deserving to be called a town. It had a Saturday market, a telephone line to the capital, and a weekly mail courier. Italian ground troops captured Sodo on 27 January 1937; it was there that two Italian generals with their divisions – Liberati with his 25th Division, and Bacarri with his 101st Division – surrendered on 22 May 1941, after a minimum of resistance. The British also captured the remnants of the 21st Division, who had escaped around the north end of Lake Abijatta. The loot included more than 4,000 officers and men, 6 medium tanks, 4 light tanks, 100 machine guns, ammunition and supplies.

By 1958 Sodo was one of 27 places in Ethiopia ranked as First Class Township. A branch of the Commercial Bank of Ethiopia was established between 1965 and 1968. The administrator of Sodo Zuria woreda and one-time student activist, Melaku Gebre Egziahber, was arrested in 1975 for encouraging peasants and the urban poor to rise up against "exploiters" in the town. In 1984, a refugee camp was established in the town for the victims of that year's famine.

On 6 November 1999, police arrested two teachers in Sodo for objecting to the use of a new language in school textbooks. Student demonstrations against the arrests led to widespread week-long protests and riots. Special police units were brought in to suppress the demonstrations, and killed as many as 10 people, injured hundreds and arrested up to 1,000 others. A former YMCA camp outside Sodo was used as a temporary detention facility for hundreds of demonstrators.

Prior to the Ethiopian 2005 General Elections, Amnesty International reports that some members of the United Ethiopian Democratic Forces political party were amongst 200 people reportedly detained under vagrancy laws in Sodo on 22 February 2005. Amnesty International included this incident as one of a series of government intimidation of opposition party activists.

== Demographics ==
Based on the 2007 Census conducted by the CSA, this city has a total population of 76,050, of whom 40,140 are men and 35,910 women. The majority of the inhabitants were Ethiopian orthodox tewahido, with 54.60% of the population reporting that belief, 38.43% practiced Protestant or pintay, 4.76% were Muslim, and 1.28% were Catholic. The 1994 national census reported this city had a total population of 36,287 of whom 18,863 were men and 17,424 were women. In 2024, the city’s population exceeded 512,498, and its area expanded to 344 km².

== Education ==
Established in 2007, Wolaita Sodo University (WSU) is a non-profit public higher education institution located in Sodo. WSU offers courses and programs leading to officially recognized higher education degrees in several areas of study. The university has campuses in different areas, including Dawuro Tarcha Campus. The city has numerous secondary schools of which the prominent ones are Wolaita Sodo Secondary & preparatory school, Bogale Walelu Secondary and Preparatory School and Wolaita Liqa School.

== Transportation ==
Sodo is served by an airport. A 166-kilometre (103 mi) road connecting Sodo with Chida, whose construction had started in 1994, was completed by early 1999. Featuring an 80-metre (260 ft) Bailey bridge across the Omo river and five other bridges, this road cost 255 million Birr, and reduced the distance between Awassa and Mizan Teferi to 400 kilometres (250 mi). According to the SNNPR's Bureau of Finance and Economic Development, as of 2003

== Sport ==
Wolaitta Dicha S.C. is an Ethiopian football club based in Sodo. The club now is playing premier league which is first level division. The club won their first domestic cup in 2017, and qualified for the 2018 CAF Confederation Cup, in which the club beat Zamalek SC and passed to the quarter-final. Wolaita Dicha Men Volleyball Team which is known in Ethiopian volleyball competition is also based on this city.

Sodo Kenema S.C. is an Ethiopian football club based in Sodo. The club now is playing super league which is second level division.

Wolaita Sodo University women's volleyball club is also based in this city. The club was established in 2020 and it was founded by Debrework Tesfaye and his colleagues teaching in Wolaita Sodo University department of Sport Science. The club won the Ethiopian Volleyball Federation knockout tournament in the same year and automatically qualified for CAVB women's club championship in 2021. The club also finished the league as a runner up in the same season. The club then won Ethiopian Women's Volleyball premier League in 2022.

The 30,000-capacity Sodo Stadium is located in Sodo. It is the largest sports venue by capacity in the city.

== Climate ==
Located in the tropics at high altitude, Sodo possesses a well-moderated Subtropical highland climate (Koppen Cwb), with a pronounced pattern of wet summers and dry winters. Despite being located in the Northern Hemisphere, Sodo is actually cooler in the "summer" than the "winter" due to much higher rainfall in the high-sun season, a phenomenon common to Sodo's region.

Climate data for Sodo, elevation 2,020 m (6,630 ft)
Month	Jan	Feb	Mar	Apr	May	Jun	Jul	Aug	Sep	Oct	Nov	Dec	Year
Mean daily maximum °C (°F)	29.1 (84.4)	29.7 (85.5)	28.8 (83.8)	28.1 (82.6)	26.3 (79.3)	24.2 (75.6)	22.0 (71.6)	22.5 (72.5)	25.5 (77.9)	27.2 (81.0)	29.2 (84.6)	29.0 (84.2)	26.8 (80.3)
Daily mean °C (°F)	21.2 (70.2)	21.8 (71.2)	21.3 (70.3)	20.7 (69.3)	19.7 (67.5)	18.6 (65.5)	17.2 (63.0)	17.3 (63.1)	19.2 (66.6)	20.1 (68.2)	21.1 (70.0)	21.0 (69.8)	19.9 (67.9)
Mean daily minimum °C (°F)	13.3 (55.9)	14.0 (57.2)	13.8 (56.8)	13.5 (56.3)	13.1 (55.6)	12.8 (55.0)	12.3 (54.1)	12.1 (53.8)	12.8 (55.0)	12.8 (55.0)	13.0 (55.4)	12.8 (55.0)	13.0 (55.4)
Average precipitation mm (inches)	29 (1.1)	39 (1.5)	86 (3.4)	147 (5.8)	156 (6.1)	150 (5.9)	218 (8.6)	187 (7.4)	123 (4.8)	130 (5.1)	42 (1.7)	26 (1.0)	1,333 (52.4)
Average relative humidity (%)	62	60	65	75	77	80	80	77	81	71	70	58	71
Source: FAO

== Twin towns ==
Wolaita Sodo is twinned with

- Bracciano, Italy

== Notable people ==
- Chernet Gugesa, an Ethiopian professional who plays for Ethiopian Premier League club Saint George and the Ethiopia national team
- Dagato Kumbe Former Wolaita Zone chief administrator and currently deputy commissioner of Ethiopian Investment Commission.
- Getahun Garedew (Dr), former state minister of ministry of Education Ethiopia
- Hailemariam Desalegn, former Prime Minister of Ethiopia who served from August 2012 until April 2018. He was also Governor of the Southern Regional State for six years..
- Samuel Urkato, Minister of Science and Higher Education, Ethiopia.
- Teshome Toga (ambassador), is politician
- Senait Mario (Dr), International fashion Designer and Model, Founder of Da Mario's Fashion and Technology institute, Addis Ababa, Ethiopia, Former Founder of one peace fashion, italy, Senait Mario stokes up African pride with travel fashion show
