= Boditi =

City in Wolaita, Ethiopia

Boditi: Bodditte (Wolaytta); ቦዲቲ (Amharic)
- City
- Map showing Boditi within Wolayita Map showing Boditi within Ethiopia
- Coordinates: 6°56′N 37°50′E
- Country: Ethiopia
- Region: South Ethiopia Regional State
- Zone: Wolaita
- Woreda: Damot Gale
- Established: 20 November 1959

Government
  - Mayor: Eshetu Tadesse (Prosperity Party)

Area
  - Total: 15,255 ha (37,700 acres)
- Elevation: 1,774 m (5,820 ft)
- Highest elevation: 2,964 m (9,724 ft)
- Lowest elevation: 1,612 m (5,289 ft)

Population (2023)
  - Total: 67,861
  - Male: 32,941
  - Female: 34,920
- Time zone: UTC+3 (EAT)

Boditi, (Amharic: ቦዲቲ) or (Wolayttattuwa: Bodditte) is a city and separate district in south central Ethiopia. The city is located in the Wolaita Zone of the South Ethiopia Regional State. This city has a latitude and longitude of 6°56′N 37°50′E with an average elevation of 2050 meters above sea level. It is the administrative center of Damot Gale district. The city is bounded by Shasha-Gale Kebele to the north, Ade-Koisha Kebele in the south, Chawkare Kebele to the east and Sibaye-Korke kebele to the west. It is located in East Rift valley at a distance of 180 miles (290 km) to the south of Addis Ababa and at about 86 miles (138 km) to the west of Hawassa.

As of 2006 permanent postal service is available, as well as electricity and telephone service, more colleges and higher educational institutions are currently being developed as the number of school-aged children increases. The map attached to C. W. Gwynn's account of his 1908/09 triangulation survey of southern Ethiopia shows Boditi, with the note that it had a market. During the early 1930s, the market was held on Tuesdays and was very important. In 1969, a group of Swedish architectural students surveyed Boditi, and presented their findings to the University of Lund.

== Demographics ==
The 1994 national census reported this city had a total population of 13,400 of whom 6,479 were men and 6,921 were women. Boditi is one of densely populated areas in South Ethiopia Regional State. Total population of the city as conducted by central statistical agency of Ethiopia in 2023 is 67,861. Among these males count 32,941 and females count 34,920.
