= List of burials of prominent people at Holy Trinity Cathedral (Addis Ababa) =

This is a list of burial of prominent people at Holy Trinity Cathedral in Addis Ababa, Ethiopia. The table arranged each entry by name, occupation, date of burial and reference.

| Name | Occupation | Burial date | Ref. |
|---|---|---|---|
| Alemayehu Eshete | Singer | 7 September 2021 | |
| Meles Zenawi | Politician; Prime Minister of Ethiopia from 1995 to 2012 | 2 September 2012 | |
| Tilahun Gessesse | Singer | 23 April 2009 | |
| Sylvia Pankhurst | Scholar of Ethiopian studies | 1960 | |
| Richard Pankhurst | Scholar of Ethiopian studies | 21 February 2017 | |
| Haile Selassie | Emperor of Ethiopia from 1930 to 1974 | 5 November 2000 | |
| Menen Asfaw | Empress consort of Ethiopia | 1962 | |
| Abuna Takla Haymanot | Patriarch of the Ethiopian Orthodox Tewahedo Church | 1988 | |
| Abune Paulos | Patriarch of the Ethiopian Orthodox Tewahedo Church | 23 August 2012 | |
| Afewerk Tekle | Painter | 15 April 2012 | |
| Girma Wolde-Giorgis | President of Ethiopia from 2001 to 2013 | 19 December 2018 | |
| Mesfin Woldemariam | Academic and human rights activist | 6 October 2020 | |
| Abebech Gobena | Humanitarian | 6 July 2021 | |
| Seble Tefera | Actress | 15 September 2015 | |
| Tamrat Desta | Singer-songwriter | 19 April 2018 | |
| Tesfaye Sahlu | Actor, comedian, singer and author | 2 August 2017 | |
| Madingo Afework | Singer | 29 September 2022 | |
| Asfaw Meshesha | Journalist and television host | 22 January 2024 | |
| Netsanet Workneh | Actor, filmmaker and TV personality | 18 January 2026 | |
