= Women in education in Ethiopia =

Women role in the education of Ethiopia remains progressive over time. Over the last 20 years, the national government made an effort to comfort equitable opportunities for females in public education. Many female students have limited access to education, which may cause negative economic impact in the country. In Ethiopia, women constitute 50% of the population that could contribute to subsistence production. According to World Data Atlas analysis in 2015, women enrollment in primary and secondary education was increased to 48.5% from 45.2% in 1992, growing at annual rate of 0.42%.

Gender difference and discrimination against women is prevailing in every educational level with many experiences' sexual violence and emotional harassment, combined with traditional attitude toward woman status. The government recently improved gender balance policy participating women in every facility of university and college academic staffs.

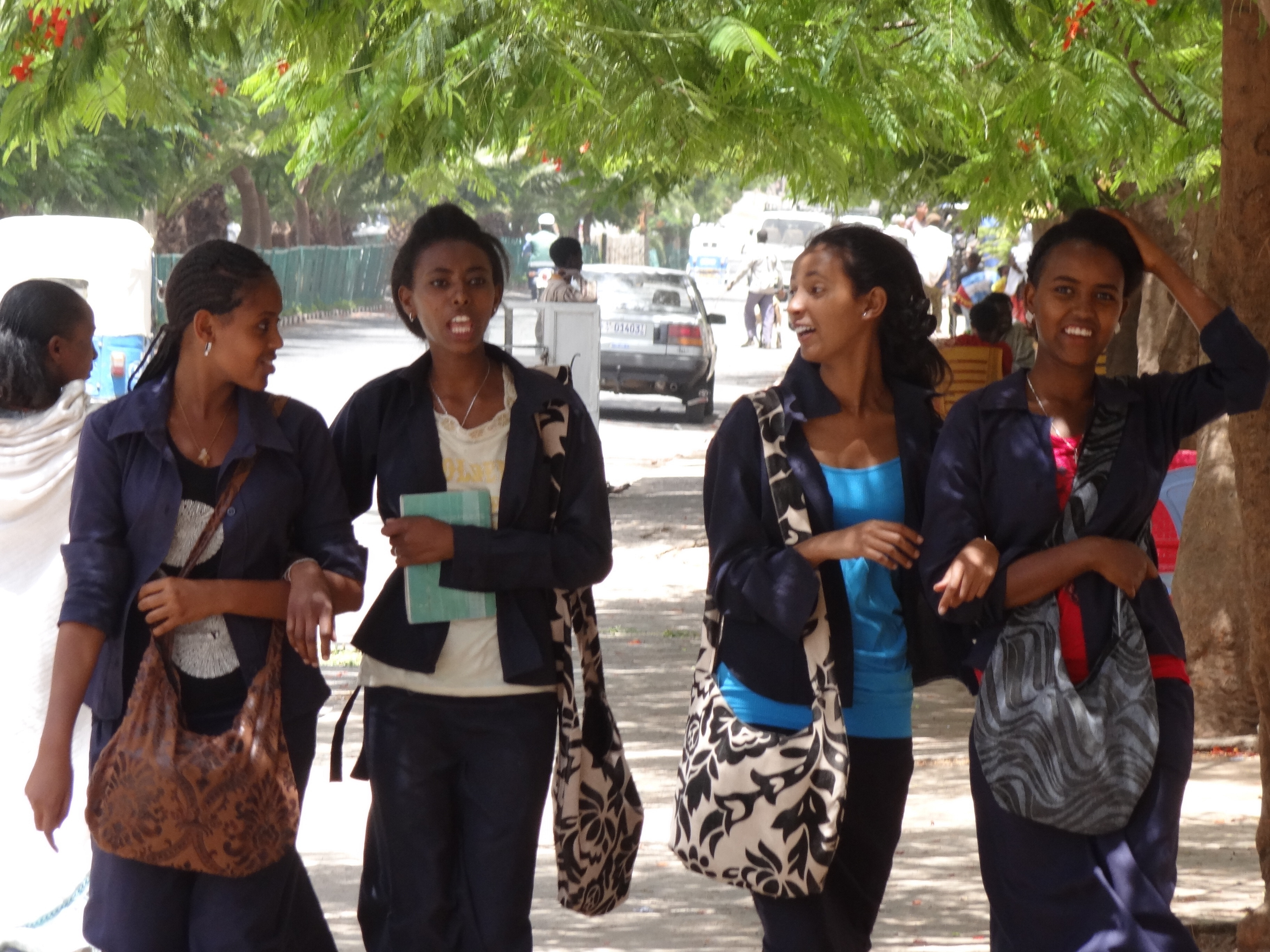
Female students in Axum, 2013

== In primary and secondary education ==
The first girls' school was opened in 1931. In 1967/1968, only 29.7% of primary schools' students, 26.7% of junior secondary students, and 18.3% of senior secondary students were girls. Of these years, 30.4% of first grade were female students. In 1982/1983, 64.5% of all students were male whereas 35.5% constitute female students. Ethiopia has made a reform on girls' education with net primary enrollment rate from 51% in 2003/2004 to 95% in 2016/2017. Meanwhile, 53% only had completed primary school, 25% of secondary, and 10% attended college. In November 2018, UNICEF in cooperation with the Ministry of Education proposed a funding program for gender oriented education to assist the educational improvements and quality.

UNICEF fund program
Type of beneficiary	2016–2018
Number of schools and students experiencing improved gender clubs	1,090 primary schools
Number of schools with new mechanisms in place to improve reporting on SRGBV	580 primary schools
Number of schools experiencing improved gender-sensitive sanitation facilities	170 primary schools
Number of woredas participating in C4D interventions that combat harmful social norms	42 woredas
Number of pastoralist girls attending UNICEF supported ABE	124,549 pastoralist girls

Funding gap (2018–2020)
Activity	Estimated funding gap (2018–2020)
"Upgrading" ABECs to offer the full set of primary courses	US$ 1,000,000
Strengthening SRGBV prevention and response, including child marriage prevention activities	US$ 2,150,000
Life skills education	US$ 350,000
Teachers' capacity building on gender responsive pedagogy	US$ 250,000

According to government statistics, in 2019–2020, while most female students enrolled primary school, only 53% progressed from lower primary education (Grade 1–4) to upper primary education (Grade 5–8). Accordingly, 68% of these could complete primary education. In most rural areas, boys' enrollment has been increased although this trend is lowering in Addis Ababa, Amhara and Tigray Region. This could be as a result of rural-urban migration among female students. Female students also encounter sexual harassment and experience victimization in high school life: with 68% young students encountered in one instance. 52% of young women victimized by sexual offense, 56% by sexual assaults, 25% by sexual coercion, and 15% by sexual aggression.

In 2015, the World Data Atlas analysis reported that female students in Ethiopia's education was 48.5%, increased from 45.2% in 1992, growing at an average annual rate of 0.42%.

== In higher education ==
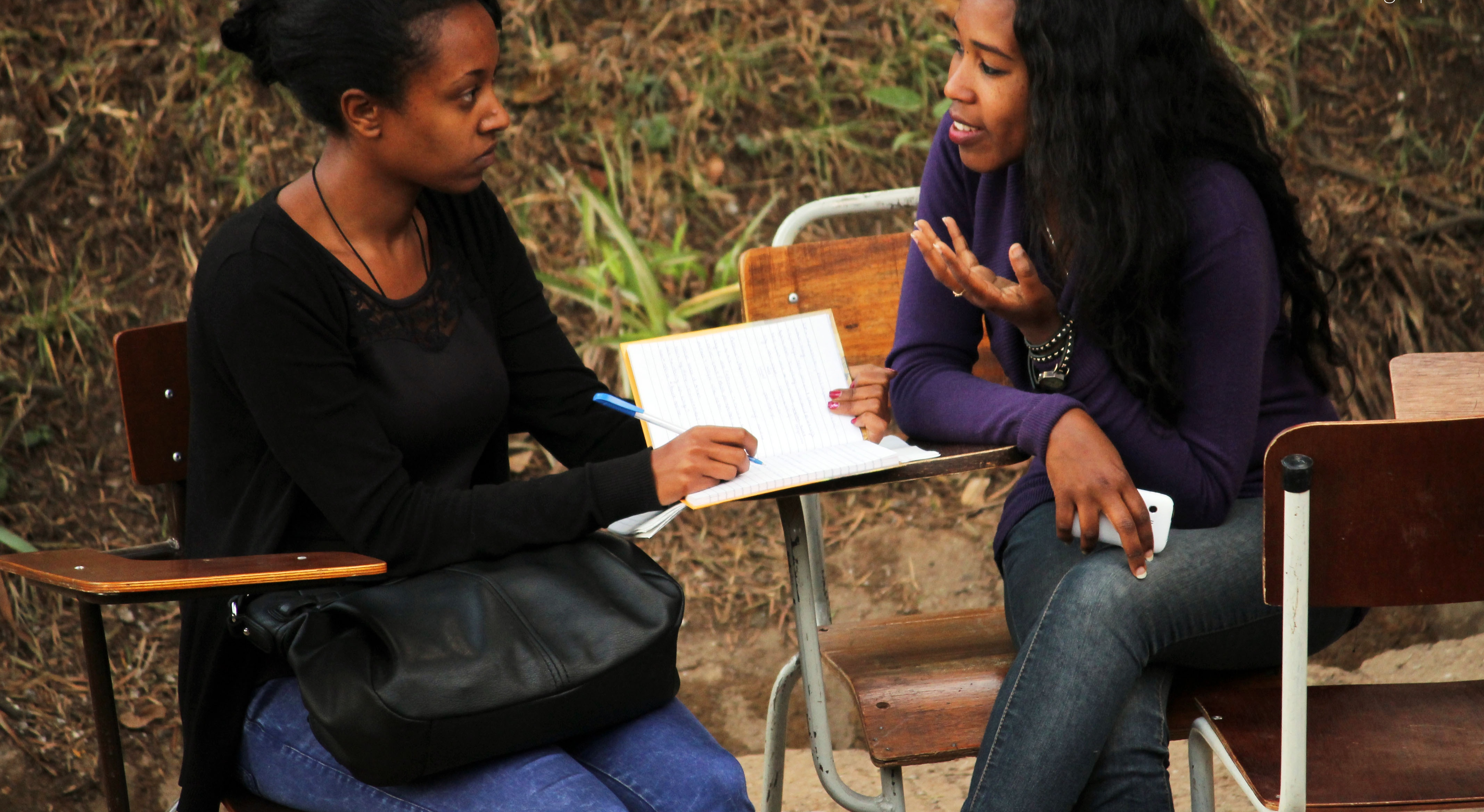
Female higher education students meeting, 2015

In the 2010–11 academic year, there were 18 million primary, 1.8 million secondary, and approximately a half million undergraduate students in education. Females only made up of 27% in the university population, a quarter of whom dropped out before graduation. This has been seen as critical for development. The gross enrollment rate for primary education was 31% for boys and 20% for females.

The gender gap of 2011 educational system was about 4% in primary school, from about 15% in 2000. From 2010 to 2014, the higher education gender gap ranking remained unchanged in Ethiopia; 127th in 2010 out of 134 countries and 136th in 2014 out of 142 countries. The 2014 World Economic Freedom reported revealed that the female enrollment ratio was 0.32 in tertiary education. By 2017, the enrollment of women in public universities increased to 12.6%, and the Ministry of Science and Higher Education Hirut Woldemariam promoted women in decision-making positions at universities.

Moreover, the government brought female students' academic staffs to 3,904; the comprising share of female academic staffs is 12.6% in 2016/2017 session. Female students also vulnerable to sexual violence in higher education. A study conducted from 1 January 2000 to 1 June 2020 meta-analysis showed that sexual violence recur throughout a year in female students was 49.4% and 36.02% respectively.

== Gender discrimination ==
Gender discrimination against women in Ethiopia is the main problem in their everyday lives compared to other women in different parts of the world. Women do have access to schooling and employment, despite being hindered by harmful traditional practices such as female genital mutilation and child marriage. Women tend to travel long distances to transport water and firewood. In addition to that, they are highly vulnerable to sexual harassment, rape, domestic and political violence, and emotional harassment.

In 1976, the National Democratic Revolution of the Derg government established the Revolutionary Ethiopian Women's Association (REWA) to prepare women in appropriate positions in society. Meanwhile, the policy only interested for its socialist revolutionary intention, despite equally treated them. In one study in Jimma University, awareness toward the existence of gender discrimination in campus diverge between male 30% and female 64%. The university signified that it has the lowest female enrollment in every type of facilities and academic staffs.
