= 2023 Ethiopian crackdown on the hospitality industry =

Anti-LGBT crackdown by the Ethiopian government against hospitality industry

- Date: 10 August 2023
- Type: Anti-LGBT crackdown
- Outcome: Hotels, bars, restaurants and other venues were shut down. Hotel owners were arrested for alleged connection of homosexual activities.

The Ethiopian government launched a crackdown on hotels, bars, restaurant and pubs in Addis Ababa for alleged homosexual activities on 10 August 2023. Security forces raided guest houses to shut them down and arrested managers linked to such acts. The Addis Ababa Peace and Security Administration Bureau stated that they were taking measures "against hotels, restaurants, guest houses, and other entertainment venues suspected of involvement in homosexual acts". The House of Guramayle, an LGBT advocacy group, is concerned that the LGBT community is being suppressed and that many self-identified gay, lesbian and transgender people are under attack on online platforms such as TikTok.

== Event ==
On 10 August 2023, the Ethiopian government launched crackdowns on venues in the hospitality industry, such as hotels, bars, restaurants and pubs in Addis Ababa for alleged homosexual activities. In an Addis Ababa Peace and Security Administration Bureau statement, the operation is discreet from the public, guest houses have been raided and their managers were arrested. The Bureau called for the public to report such incidents. Human rights groups said that LGBT people are still under persecution and stigma in Ethiopia and their identities are strongly prohibited from being exposed to society.

House of Guramayle, an LGBT advocacy group, is concerned that TikTok is the main platform for LGBT Ethiopians to be harassed by having their names, photographs and online profiles shared. On 2 August, a TikTok user called for gay men to be stabbed in their buttocks and a young man was threatened by saying "We should find them and kill them before stumbling with his foot". Many LGBT Ethiopians feel threatened and abused by TikTok users engaging in coordinated online harassment.

== See also ==
- LGBTQ rights in Ethiopia
