= Corruption in Ethiopia =

Several sectors are contributing to corruption in Ethiopia, where businesses are particularly vulnerable. Land distribution and administration is a sector where corruption is institutionalized, and facilitation payments as well as bribes are often demanded from businesses when they deal with land-related issues.

Corruption also occurs when businesses obtain permits and licenses due to complicated bureaucracy. Public procurement is also seriously hampered by corruption, and different types of irregularities exist, such as non-transparent tender processes and awarding contracts to people with close connections to the government and ruling party.

Corruption has also been linked to human rights violations, which have been reported to cause widespread unrest in Ethiopia since 2015. A change in the country's leadership in 2018 saw some arrests and was hoped to bring a change to the status quo. However, The Reporter opines that sustained anti-corruption efforts have not translated to judicial arrests and closure of cases till the very end.

On Transparency International's 2025 Corruption Perceptions Index, Ethiopia scored 38 on a scale from 0 ("highly corrupt") to 100 ("very clean"). When ranked by score, Ethiopia ranked 96th among the 182 countries in the Index, where the country ranked first is perceived to have the most honest public sector. For comparison with regional scores, the best score among sub-Saharan African countries (Note: Angola, Benin, Botswana, Burkina Faso, Burundi, Cameroon, Cape Verde, Central African Republic, Chad, Comoros, Côte d'Ivoire, Democratic Republic of the Congo, Djibouti, Equatorial Guinea, Eritrea, Eswatini, Ethiopia, Gabon, Gambia, Ghana, Guinea, Guinea-Bissau, Kenya, Lesotho, Liberia, Madagascar, Malawi, Mali, Mauritania, Mauritius, Mozambique, Namibia, Niger, Nigeria, Republic of the Congo, Rwanda, Sao Tome and Principe, Senegal, Seychelles, Sierra Leone, Somalia, South Africa, South Sudan, Sudan, Tanzania, Togo, Uganda, Zambia, and Zimbabwe.) was 68, the average was 32 and the worst was 9. For comparison with worldwide scores, the best score was 89 (ranked 1), the average was 42, and the worst was 9 (ranked 181, in a two-way tie).

The Ethiopian Federal Ethics and Anti-Corruption Commission (FEACC) is an anti-corruption institution that was established in 2001. It is accountable to the Prime Minister and has the power to register the assets of government officials.

== Corruption cases ==
Ethiopia has witnessed significant corruption cases, accompanied by human rights violations and unrest. Corruption is in all forms: clientelism, kleptocracy, rent-seeking, and state capture. Even though the FEACC was established to combat corruption cases, its implementation is highly inadequate, as the malpractice abides in the judiciary and legislature.

Facilitation payments and bribes in the government are rampant where land is leased to the state in order to obtain government contracts. The Ethiopian Federal Ethics and Anti-Corruption Commission contains the Revised Federal Ethics and Anti-Corruption Commission Establishment Proclamation and the Revised Anti-Corruption Law that decriminalized all forms of corruption, including active and passive bribery, bribing foreign officials, and money laundering. The intervention of facilitating payment to the civil servants as a means of a gift offer is illegal and deemed to influence their decisions.

== In judiciary ==
Corruption in Ethiopia's judicial body greatly affects companies and business enterprises by overturning judges' decisions using favoritism. Although the judiciary of Ethiopia shall be independent, judges are primary targets of high-ranking officials to favor them.

Some companies indicated that they are frustrated by the court system preventing them from conducting their businesses. On average, enforcing contracts takes place in 530 days, which is faster than the regional average.

== In law enforcement ==
Corruption is highly prevalent in the police force, becoming the main issue. According to a 2016 survey, half of the respondents believe the police are corrupt, with over half of the companies saying they paid for their own security. Bribery among police officers is widespread.

In January 2015, the Dire Dawa High Court convicted four police officers for misappropriating sisa drugs in 240 carton boxes while on duty. According to Afrobarometer (2024), about one-third (32%) of respondents said that the police force is corrupt. The majority (57%) said they trust the police in a certain manner.

== In public service ==
Corruption within government public provision threatens companies, with petty corruption, extortion, fraud, embezzlement, nepotism, cronyism, and bribery common in public service. Businesses are involved in such cases of corruption in order to undertake them quickly. Participating as a member of the civil service often required affiliation with the ruling party.

Foreign companies blamed the Ethiopian Electric Power as the most corrupt electricity provider. Starting a business and obtaining a construction permit in Ethiopia usually takes a twofold duration and a longer duration.

== In land administration ==
Corruption is the most prevalent in land administration in Ethiopia, where property rights are poorly protected by the government. The corruption includes bribery and land grabbing, causing a lack of transparency, resources, and poor policy in strong institutions. With the absence of private ownership, the government owned and leased the land for up to 99 years as a means of eminent domain.

In 2016, the government revoked the ownership of 3,000 investors of a 510-hectare parcel, for not developing the land due to not starting production in the agreed time

== In tax administration ==
Corruption in tax administration includes bribery, irregular and facilitation payments. Tax regulation is the major obstacle to business, impeding investment and economic growth in Ethiopia. About 78% of respondents said corruption is extremely prevalent in tax revenue.

The Ethiopian Revenues and Customs Authority is perceived to be the most corrupt institution. In 2018, the World Bank ranked Ethiopia 178th of 200 surveyed countries in a report based on the 2017 TRACE Bribery Risk Matrix.

== In custom administration ==
Corruption in customs administration involves bribery, where the Ethiopian Revenues and Customs Authority is frequently cited as the most corrupt institution. These corruptions are committed at the border, during the import process, and with tariffs. Corruption lags the customs procedures, which impacts its efficiency in terms of time. Additionally, state-owned business firms often take advantage of the private sector by using high-level government officials in order to quickly access customs clearances, distorting domestic and foreign investor enterprises.

In response to such malpractice, Prime Minister Abiy Ahmed established a national anti-corruption committee in November 2022 to tackle and identify the corruption problem in the customs authority.

== In legislation ==
Corruption in Ethiopia's legislature includes clientelism, kleptocracy, rent-seeking, and state capture. The Revised Federal Ethics and Anti-corruption Commission Establishment Proclamation and the Revised Anti-Corruption Law criminalized any form of corruption, though there is no known prosecution of such cases in the private sectors.

The Assets and Property Registration Law is solely responsible for collecting assets of government officials and has the power to deny the registry. Article 444 of the Criminal Code protects the rights of whistleblowers, but not private whistleblowers in reality.

== In civil society ==
Civil society is facing frequent censorship by the government. Although freedom of expression and press are guaranteed in the Constitution, there are instances of the Criminal Code limiting the rights in favor of controlling obscene communication and defamation of public officials. Journalists often face persecution.

For instance, during the 2016 nationwide protests, a state of emergency was declared that led to harassment, detention and prosecution of journalists by the government forces. Ethiopia became the worst jailer in Africa, with conviction of terrorism, according to the Committee to Protect Journalists (CPJ) report in 2024.

== See also ==
- Ethiopian Federal Ethics and Anti-Corruption Commission
