= Fryat Yemane =

Ethiopian actress, television host, and fashion model

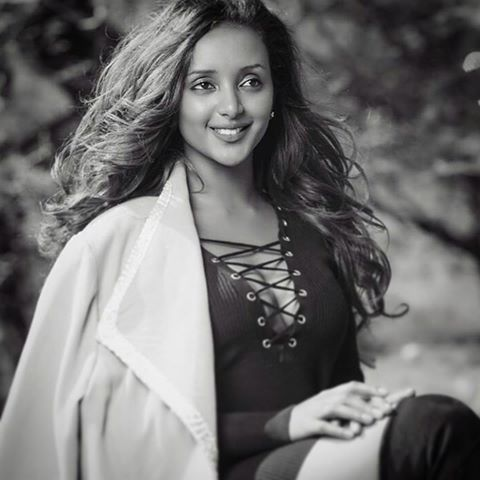
- Born: 1 October 1991 (age 34); Gondar, Ethiopia
- Education: Business Management, Hawassa University
- Alma mater: Hawassa University
- Occupations: Actress, television host
- Years active: 2014–present
- Notable work: Wefe Komech

Fryat Yemane (Tigrigna: ፍርያት የማነ; born 1 October 1991) is an Ethiopian actress, television host and model. Fryat was nominated best actress of the year on Leza Art Award for her performance on Wefe Komech, 2016 film. Fryat has been nominated best actress of the year on Ethio Zodiac Award for her performance in the film Maya (2017) and recently awarded for best independent actress on Hollywood Africa Prestigious Award (2017) for her performance in the film titled Begize. Fryat made her screen debut in Gudegna Nech (2014).

== Personal life ==
Born in Ethiopia, Fryat is the daughter of Yemane Gebremeskel and her mother Sesen. Her parents used to reside in Gondar, where they lived due to work. Fryat was born and stayed in Gondar until they moved back to their hometown Mekelle. Fryat has a Bachelor of Art degree in Business Management from Hawassa University. Currently Fryat lives in Addis Ababa, where she works and runs a restaurant with foreign and native cuisine.

== Career ==
Fryat's performance in Gudegna Nech brought her initial attention.

From 11 September 2017, Fryat appeared on TV show on EBS TV where she co-hosts with Asfaw Meshesha. She also recently started her own business in traditional clothing sector called DirMug by Fryat.
