= Hawassa University =

University in Hawassa, Sidama Region, Ethiopia

- ሀዋሳ ዩኒቨርሲቲ
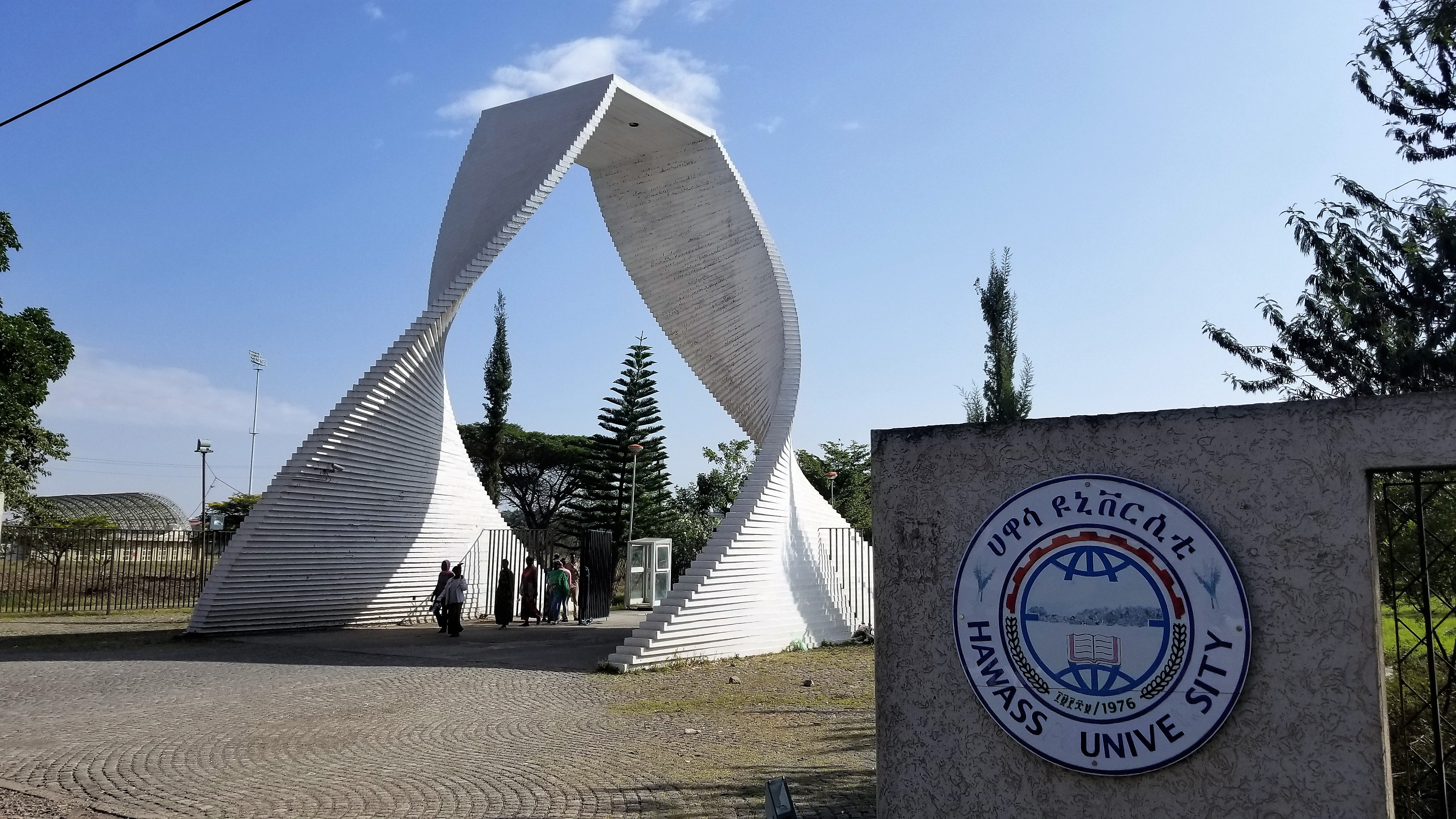
- The main gate of the university
- Type: National
- Established: 1999
- President: Dr. Ayano Berasso Hula
- Academic staff: 1,325
- Total staff: 1,909
- Students: 48,558
- Undergraduates: 23,537
- Location: Hawassa, Sidama Region, Ethiopia; 7°03′10″N 38°29′58″E
- Campus: Residential
- Language: English
- Website: www.hu.edu.et

- Location in Ethiopia

Hawassa University (HU) (Amharic: ሀዋሳ ዩኒቨርሲቲ) is a residential national university in Hawassa, Sidama Region, Ethiopia. It is approximately 278 kilometres (173 mi) south of Addis Ababa, Ethiopia. The Ministry of Science and Higher Education admits qualified students to Hawassa University based on their score on the Ethiopian Higher Education Entrance Examination (EHEEE).

== History ==
The origin of Hawassa University was the establishment of Debub University ("South" University) on 22 December 1998 via a government proclamation. Debub University originally consisted of Awassa College of Agriculture, Wondo Genet College of Forestry, and Dila Teachers' Education and Health Science College.

Debub University was renamed Hawassa University on 17 February 2006.

Hawassa University was reestablished on 23 May 2011 in the heart of Hawaasa City in Sidama Regional state.

== Academics ==
HU offers 81 undergraduate programs, 108 Masters programs, and 16 PhD programs. In March 2018, the student population was 48,558.

HU operates seven campuses.

- Hawassa College of Agriculture
- College of Law and Governance
- College of Social Sciences and Humanities
- College of Natural and Computational Sciences
- College of Business and Economics
- College of Medicine and Health Science
- Wondo Genet College of Forestry and Natural Resources
- Institute of Technology
- College Of Education
- School of Graduate Studies
- School of Continuing Education

== Notable alumni ==
- Samuel Urkato, Minister of Science and Higher Education and was student of the university.
- Fryat Yemane, actress, television host and model, was a student at the university.
- Fitsum Assefa, Ethiopia Minister of Planning and Development Commission, taught at the university.
- Mekdes Daba Feyssa, Ethiopia Minister of Health.

== See also ==
- List of universities and colleges in Ethiopia
- Education in Ethiopia
