= 2019 anti-LGBTQ protests in Ethiopia =

June 2019 anti-LGBT protests in Ethiopia

2019 anti-LGBT protests in Ethiopia
- Date: 25 May 2019 – June 2019
- Location: Ethiopia
- Caused by: Tour announcement by LGBT organization Toto Tours in May 2019; Illegality of homosexuality in Ethiopia
- Goals: Tour cancellation by Toto Tours
- Methods: Using variety propaganda tools to suppress the tour, often combined with religious integrity; Preaching against homosexuality (especially in every Ethiopian Orthodox Tewahedo Church communities)
- Result: Tour cancelled in June 2019

In early June 2019, a nationwide anti-LGBTQ protests were occurred in Ethiopia following announcement of a Chicago-based LGBTQ organization Toto Tours to visit Ethiopia, and posted to visit religious site like Lalibela in October of that year.

On 25 May 2019, the company owner, Dan Ware, announced to visit Ethiopia while touring Bulgaria and Romania, and precaution was recommended by some Ethiopian gay activists via email to stop visiting Ethiopia. Ware also faced death threat from Ethiopian religious and communal sects after posting in social media.

The planned announcement has been condemned by various religious and governmental groups, mostly from the Ethiopian Orthodox Tewahedo Church. Speaking at press conference on 3 June, Dereje Negash, a vice chairman of Sileste Mihret Church United Association, denounced the announcement and said that "the government’s indifference on the issue is helping the LGBTQ movement in the East African country."

== Background ==
Toto Tours, a Chicago-based LGBTQ organization was founded in 1990 by Dan Ware. On 25 May 2019, while escorting a group through Bulgaria and Romania, Ware received a warning from Ethiopian gay email that "...there is a campaign against you and your clients by some so called ‘activists’ in Ethiopia, for being an inclusive tour company and I thought you should know about the matter, for the safety of your employees and clients." In addition, Ware announced in social media that they would visit religious site such as Lalibela in October of that year. The post included a "light-hearted play on word" saying "We will rock you," in reference to the song by music group Queen. Just trying to be clever. Just to have a saying. It didn't mean anything other than this experience of seeing this incredible place will change your life." Ware also reported death threat and hate messages for posting on social media.

Under Ethiopian Criminal Code Article 629, homosexuality is illegal and punishable up to 15 years in prison. This applies for national and foreign citizens.

== Event ==
Nationwide organized anti-LGBTQ protests were held in early June 2019, and numerous religious groups repeatedly denounced the proposed plan to visit Ethiopia. At the government sponsored event, Mayor of Addis Ababa Takele Uma Banti announced that Toto Tours would be unwelcome in the city in response to a question from the audience. The Patriarch of the Ethiopian Orthodox Tewahedo Church Abune Mathias made a video statement for condemning the tour.

On 10 June, Ware wrote an appeal for Ministry of Culture and Tourism for "...a formal declaration about the permissibility of our planned tour in October 2019. If we are banned, we feel it is only fair that you provide us with the legal foundation for that decision. If we are welcome, it is necessary for you to be on the record so that the people will know they must treat us in a civil and respectful manner." Similar appeal likewise was requested for the Prime Minister Office, which neither been rejected.

== Response ==
Numerous groups affiliated with the Ethiopian Orthodox Tewahedo Church condemned the tour. At press conference on 3 June, Dereje Negash, vice chairman of Sileste Mihret United Association, an Ethiopian Orthodox Tewahedo organization, denounced that tour quoting that "the government’s indifference on the issue is helping the LGBTQ movement in the East African country."

Tagay Tadele of the Inter-Religious Council of Ethiopia said "[LGBT] tour programmes and dating programmes that try to use our historical sites and heritage should be immediately stopped by the Ethiopian government."
