= LGBTQ rights in Ethiopia =

- Ethiopia
- Legal status: Illegal
- Penalty: Up to 15 years to life imprisonment
- Gender identity: No
- Military: No
- Discrimination protections: No

Family rights
- Recognition of relationships: No recognition of same-sex unions
- Adoption: No

Lesbian, gay, bisexual, transgender, and queer (LGBTQ) people in Ethiopia face significant challenges not experienced by non-LGBTQ residents. Both male and female types of same-sex sexual activity are illegal in the country, with reports of high levels of discrimination and abuses against LGBTQ people. Ethiopia has a long history of social conservatism and same-sex sexual activity is considered a cultural taboo.

The majority of Ethiopians remain hostile towards LGBTQ identities and believe them to be a "Western perversion of their societal values". Homosexual men are suspected of causing the HIV/AIDS epidemic. Discrimination and stigma are therefore commonplace with some Ethiopian LGBTQ people suppressing their identity or fleeing as asylum seekers. According to the 2007 Pew Global Attitudes Project, 97 percent of Ethiopians believed that homosexuality is something society should not accept. This was the second-highest rate of non-acceptance in the 45 countries surveyed.

Gay and lesbian people do not openly serve in the army despite the lack of a law regarding service in the military. Booshtee is a derogatory term for a gay person in Ethiopia, often interchangeably used as an insult for despicable being.

== History ==
It has been claimed by scholars Wendy Belcher and Michael Kleiner that same-sex activity in Ethiopia was referenced in the hagiography "The Life and Struggles of Our Mother Wälättä P̣eṭros" (1672), particularly noting a scene where certain nuns were "depicted as 'lustful' towards each other", which caused Walatta Petros to be enraged. In a September 2020 academic article, Dr. Yirga Gelaw Woldeyes criticized this translation, arguing that ይትማርዓ/ይትማርሐ (yətmarrəˁa, yətmarrəha, [feminine]) means "guiding each other" in its immediate context, not necessarily implying lust.

In 2008, LGBTQ people became increasingly visible in Ethiopia when hundreds of homosexuals signed a petition for equal rights and appealed to the prime minister Meles Zenawi. However, the appeal was blocked en route to the prime minister's office. In the same year, an unofficial gay marriage took place in Sheraton Addis. In the early 2010s, some media outlets with the cooperation of the government imposed restrictions over the discussion of "LGBTQ ideology". These policies of censorship have yet to be enacted into law.

=== Gender roles in Maale culture ===
Donald Donham suggested that a small minority of Maales who are apparently male occasionally adopt feminine societal roles, donning typically female attire and occasionally having sex with men.

=== Gender fluidity and acceptance in Nuer society ===
Nuer researcher Brian MacDermot initially believed same-sex relations didn't exist. However, he encountered a transgender woman accepted by the village. This person, formerly a man who dressed as a woman, received spiritual approval to change status and marry a husband. This suggests precolonial Nuer society had some acceptance of gender fluidity.

=== Same-sex practices among the Harari ===
Traveling in Ethiopia in the 1920s, Bieber encountered "Uranism" among the Harari and noted that "sodomy is not foreign to the Harari". He also noted mutual masturbation of both sexes, of all ages and between peoples, and specified that among the Harari "Uranism" was practiced as often between adult men as between men and boys.

=== Sexual behavior among the Amhara and Qemant peoples ===
According to David F. Greenberg, shepherd boys of the Amhara and Qemant developed homosexual relationships with one another, engaging in anal and intercrural intercourse up until the time they married.

== Legality of same-sex sexual activity ==
The previous Penal Code of the country, enacted in 1957, encompassed a dedicated chapter addressing "sexual deviations." Contained within this chapter, Article 600 prescribed punitive measures for engaging in sexual acts or any other conduct deemed "indecent" with a person of the same sex. The prescribed penalties ranged from imprisonment for a period of 10 days to three years. The current Penal Code, enacted in 2004, continues to proscribe same-sex sexual activity as a criminal offense. As per the provisions outlined in Article 629, individuals found involved in such activities may face imprisonment, with a minimum sentence of one year, as explicitly delineated in Article 630. Additionally, under Article 630(1)(b), “making a profession” of such acts aggravates the penalty to up to 10 years.

In Ethiopian law, the wording of the penal code treats a homosexual act as an act of an aggressor against a victim. Consequently, the offense of the aggressor is considered aggravated, when it results in the suicide of the victim for reasons of "shame, distress or despair".

=== Enforcement of criminalizing provisions ===
ILGA World has documented multiple cases in Ethiopia where police arrested and detained people based on their perceived sexual orientation. Documentation shows police conducted residential searches without warrants following neighbor complaints. In 2014, police arrested a gay man who, according to ILGA World's report, was denied access to legal counsel while in detention. The report states other inmates physically and sexually assaulted him during his detention. Court records show no trial proceedings, and subsequent investigations have not determined his location. ILGA World's documentation indicates additional arrests based on individuals' appearance. The reports describe physical abuse during detention. In January 2021, two individuals were released from detention, after which police disclosed their sexual orientation to their families. One of these individuals died by suicide following this disclosure.

In July 2021, German authorities issued a deportation order for a trans woman originally from Qatar but with Ethiopian citizenship. According to her testimony, while previously in Ethiopia, someone discovered that she was registered as male in her passport and reported this to Ethiopian authorities after attempting extortion. She reported being held in an Ethiopian men's prison for approximately one year, where she experienced physical and sexual abuse from both staff and other inmates. Her lawyer distanced himself from the case, possibly fearing accusations of homosexuality and legal consequences. German officials argued that she would be safe in Ethiopia because she could "pass" as cisgender, citing the absence of explicit laws regarding gender identity as justification for deportation.

=== Zim Anlem anti-gay campaign ===
Zim Anlem (Amharic: ዝም አንልም) is an anti-gay organisation which campaigns against the government's efforts to decriminalize homosexual acts. The campaign was originally founded around 2014 by Dereje Negash, who is affiliated with the Ethiopian Orthodox Tewahedo Church. The movement gained publicity in 2019 after telecasting incidents of child-rape.

== Public opinion ==
Traditional attitudes around sex and sexuality are prevalent in Ethiopia, with many Ethiopians holding that homosexuality is a choice and not innate. Arguments are made of it being an import from the West and that Ethiopian society should not accept it as a legitimate orientation. A 2007 Pew Global Attitudes Project found 97% of Ethiopian residents said that homosexuality should be rejected by society. This was the second-highest percentage among the countries surveyed, exceeded only by Mali.

Ethiopians tend to be disapproving of homosexuality, but attitudes vary by regions depending on the local cultural norms. Opposition is generally greater in predominantly Christian regions such as among the Habesha people of the Ethiopian highlands. This is because of the historical influence of the Ethiopian Orthodox Church and its teachings. Ethiopian Muslims such as the Harari, Afars and Somalis are also generally hostile to the LGBTQ community.

The US Department of State's 2011 Human Rights Report found that,

There were some reports of violence against lesbian, gay, bisexual, and transgender (LGBT) individuals; however, reporting was limited due to fears of retribution, discrimination, or stigmatization. Persons did not identify themselves as LGBTQ due to severe societal stigma and the illegality of consensual same-sex sexual activity. In early December 2011, Christian and Muslim religious leaders attempted to derail a seminar on sexual health that was targeted at men who have sex with men. The government intervened, and the seminar went ahead, although at a different location. The AIDS Resource Center in Addis Ababa reported that the majority of self-identified gay and lesbian callers, the majority of whom were male, requested assistance in changing their behavior in order to avoid discrimination. Many gay men reported anxiety, confusion, identity crises, depression, self-ostracism, religious conflict, and suicide attempts.

The same report found that stigma and discrimination toward persons living with HIV/AIDS impacted residents' ability to receive an education, find employment and integrate into the community. In 2017, the US Department of State reported that there was certain violence toward LGBTQ people across the community, but was unable to conduct deep research due to feared discrimination and retribution.

== Living conditions ==
Since 2008, human rights campaigners have increasingly shown concern for the wellbeing of LGBTQ people in Ethiopia. According to a 2008 Human Rights Watch report, there was widespread violence against people who identified as gay, lesbian or bisexual. The US Department of State accused the Ethiopian government of unlawfully killing citizens, as well as carrying out acts of torture and arbitrary detention. According to several surveys and reports, homosexuality caused a moral panic in Ethiopian society and many Ethiopians felt "it was brought by the West to pervert society". Ethiopians who hold traditional views or are religious devotees, especially Ethiopian Orthodox Tewahedo followers and Muslims, are generally intolerant of LGBTQ people. This leads LGBTQ people to face social stigma amongst the broader population. Internet censorhip has limited the ability of LGBTQ people and their allies to organize campaigns and petitions.

In December 2008, nearly a dozen Ethiopian religious figures (including the leader of Ethiopian Muslims and the heads of the Orthodox, Protestant and Catholic churches) adopted a resolution against homosexuality, urging Ethiopian lawmakers to endorse a ban on homosexual activity in the constitution. This included Ethiopian Catholic Archbishop Berhaneyesus Demerew Souraphiel.

They also held homosexuality responsible for the rise in sexual attacks on children and young men. Abune Paulos, the patriarch of the Ethiopian Orthodox Tewahedo Church, said, "This is something very strange in Ethiopia, the land of the Bible that condemns this very strongly. For people to act in this manner they have to be dumb, stupid like animals. We strongly condemn this behaviour. They (homosexuals) have to be disciplined and their acts discriminated, they have to be given a lesson."

In 2012, a pro-gay conference was scheduled to be held in Addis Ababa. The conference was cancelled due to pressure from fundamentalist Christians and religious groups, who protested against the conference and called its organisers "missionaries of evil".

In June 2012, an anti-gay conference was held at the headquarters of the African Union concerning the alleged "consequences of homosexuality as a causative agent for HIV/AIDS, sexually transmitted disease and several psychological disorders".

Dr Seyoum Antoniyos, President of United for Life and influential activist, organised a national conference in 2013 attended by politicians and religious leaders. He argues that homosexuality is the result of a "deep psychological problem", often caused by abuse or some form of "social crisis".

According to a report published by ILGA World in 2021, fear of stigmatization and discrimination deters many LGBTQ individuals in Ethiopia from reporting incidents involving arrests, violence, or mistreatment. The report states that instances of mob violence have occurred in Addis Ababa, where individuals perceived to be LGBTQ were physically attacked. ILGA World notes that such incidents are often not reported to police, citing concerns over lack of protection or legal recourse. The report attributes this to the absence of anti-discrimination legislation and limited institutional support for LGBTQ individuals.

=== 2014 proposed anti-gay bill and rally ===
In March 2014, the Ethiopian Council of Ministers endorsed an anti-gay bill put forward by lawmakers. This bill would have placed homosexuality on a list of 'non-pardonable' offences by the Ethiopian president, and was initially scheduled to be put up to a vote in March.

In early April, two groups (the Addis Ababa Youth Forum and a church group associated with the Ethiopian Orthodox Tewahedo Church) planned an anti-gay rally for 26 April in Addis Ababa amidst discussion of the proposed bill. Speaking to a news conference, the groups claimed that 'homosexual acts' had 'reached an alarming rate'. Dereje Negash, chairman of the latter group, said:

Children are being raped by gay people in this country. Just yesterday we have met a woman whose boy was raped by two other men. All in all, gay acts are against health, the law, religion and our culture, so we should break the silence and create awareness about it.

However, the Ethiopian government later cancelled both the planned rally and the proposed bill by the Council of Ministers. Redwan Hussien, a government spokesman, said the anti-gay rally 'was on certain groups' agenda, but not the government's'. As for the proposed bill, he said that "[Homosexuality] is not a serious crime...The government thinks the current jail term is enough", confirming that homosexuality would not become an unpardonable offence. Dereje Negash said that the rally was cancelled after the Ethiopian Orthodox Tewahedo Church asked the government to do so, alleging that he had been "threatened by the gay community for organising the rally".

=== 2019 anti-LGBTQ protests ===
In June 2019, a Chicago-based LGBTQ community, Toto Tours, announced its visit to Ethiopia, specifically to Bahir Dar and Lalibela from October. The tour incited objections from Ethiopians and the diaspora abroad, who organized protests in response. The organisation's owner Dan Ware said the controversy began in May 2019 when the group posted plans on social media. On 8 September, Dereje Negash denounced "the government's indifference to helping the LGBTQ movement in the East African country." An anonymous LGBTQ activist told Associated Press of his concern that there are wide misconceptions in the country that gay people may be culpable for the increasing incidence of rape.

=== 2023 crackdown on hospitality ===
On 10 August 2023, the Ethiopian government raided venues in the hospitality industry in order to crack down on alleged homosexual activity in Addis Ababa. Security forces raided guest houses to shut them down and arrested managers linked to such acts. The Addis Ababa Peace and Security Administration Bureau stated that they were taking measures "against hotels, restaurants, guest houses, and other entertainment venues suspected of involvement in homosexual acts". The Bureau called for the public to report such incidents. Human rights groups said that LGBTQ people in Ethiopia still face persecution and stigma and are strongly prohibited from exposing their identities to society.

The House of Guramayle, an LGBTQ advocacy group, expressed concerns about the LGBTQ community being suppressed and self-identified gay, lesbian and transgender people experiencing online harassment on platforms such as TikTok. On 2 August, a TikTok user called for gay men to be stabbed in their buttocks, and a young man was threatened by an individual who said "We should find them and kill them before stumbling with his foot".

== LGBTQ organizations ==
In 2007, an LGBTQ group named 'The Ethiopian Gays, Lesbians, Bisexual & Transgender Committee' was formed with the intention of campaigning for recognition and rights for LGBTQ people in Ethiopia.

In 2013, an LGBTQ advocacy group named the 'DANA Social Club' was founded by Beki Abiy. The group has a goal of supporting self-stigmatized and discriminated gays and lesbians to freely express their sexual orientation and to campaign for transgender people's rights to sex reassignment surgery. The group chiefly operates via online campaigning and they maintain an archive called the Ethiopian Gay Library.

== Summary table ==
| Same-sex sexual activity legal | No (Penalty: Up to 15 years imprisonment) |
| Equal age of consent | No |
| Anti-discrimination laws in employment only | No |
| Anti-discrimination laws in the provision of goods and services | No |
| Anti-discrimination laws in all other areas (incl. indirect discrimination, hate speech) | No |
| Same-sex marriages | No (Statutory ban since 2009) |
| Recognition of same-sex couples | No |
| Step-child adoption by same-sex couples | No |
| Joint adoption by same-sex couples | No |
| Gays and lesbians allowed to serve openly in the military | No |
| Right to change legal gender | No |
| Access to IVF for lesbians | No |
| Commercial surrogacy for gay male couples | No (Illegal for all couples regardless of sexual orientation) |
| MSMs allowed to donate blood | Yes No explicit restrictions. |

== See also ==
- Human rights in Ethiopia
- LGBTQ rights in Africa
