= Rape in Ethiopia =

Sexual violence in Ethiopia

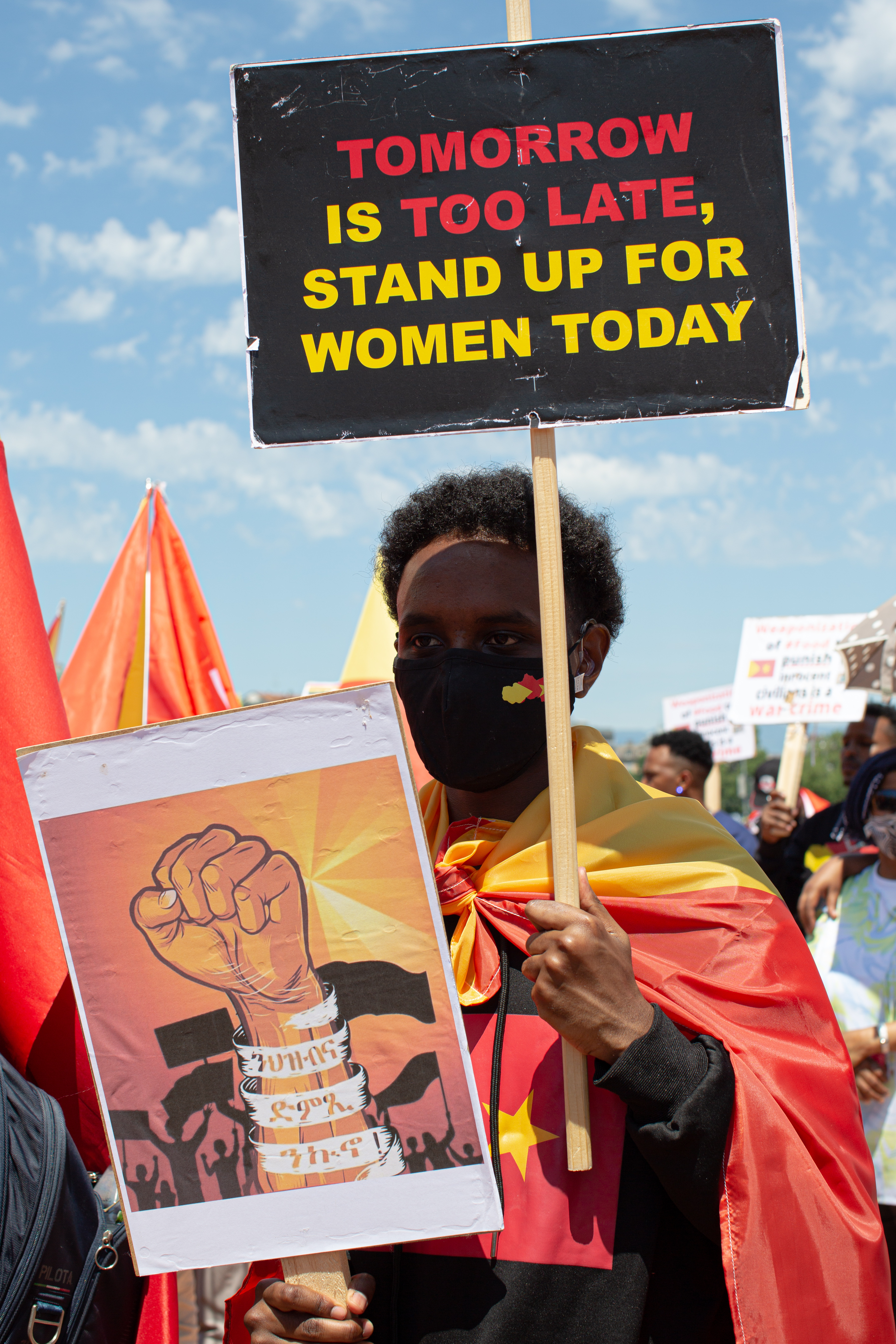
A man holding poster to denounce the sexual violence in the Tigray War

Rape in Ethiopia is highly prevalent, despite the case is still underreported due to fear, and shame of violence, especially in women. There are variety factors that contribute rape, and is controversial topic. Major factors that cause rape include societal norms encompassing masculinity, gender inequality, anger, sadism of the rapists as well as poverty. The Ethiopian society generally tolerated such violence and defend the value. They thought that women would tend to follow Westernized culture, even this notion is supported by educated people. There are also abduction, child marriage, and sex works in urban areas.

Under Article 620 of Ethiopian Criminal Code, rape is punishable by law. Recently rape is appearing during the war, especially in the Tigray War. Since beginning of the war in November 2020, nearly 1,300 rape cases were reported to authorities, many of whom were underreported.

== Status ==
=== Causes ===
Although varied motivation associated with rape and is almost controversial topic, the most known causes of rape in Ethiopia is cultural basis based on gender inequality, anger, sadism of the rapists. Evidence revealed that sexual aspect of rape is of secondary practice as married man and men with partner who had forced themselves on other women or children.

There are complex factors the cause rape in Ethiopia, especially with highly traditional, violent, and poor communities.

==== Culture ====
Talking about the culture, men often forced to dominate women where rape cases believed to be increased over time. There is also a defense mechanism in societies in Ethiopia, and Ethiopians proud of their culture and social system, resisting any changes to them. Even when women raised the issue of violations in their rights, society told them that they are "westernized", even those by educated people.

Men in twenties responded that rape is justified for desiring women and or born children because of their empowerment. Another case is directed to sexual frustration, lack of self-awareness, lack of self-esteem, and due to combination of family and environmental factors. Ethiopian society upholds the justification of sexual violence against women and girls, involving abduction and child marriage.

==== Poverty ====
Poverty is another factor that prompts women to engage in sex workers and prostitution, which routinely causing abuse and rape. Women who are subjected to premature marriage would migrate to urban areas and hired as domestic workers, which routinely involved to sex work. They do not often rape rather than engage in prostitution at streets and home where they serve as a worker.

=== Criminal offense ===
Under the Criminal Code of Ethiopia Article 620, the rape is punishable by the following measures:

(1) Whoever compels a woman to submit to sexual-intercourse outside wedlock, whether by the use of violence or grave intimidation, or after having rendered her unconscious or incapable of resistance, is punishable with rigorous imprisonment from five years to fifteen years. (2) Where the crime is committed:

a) on a young woman between thirteen and eighteen years of age; or b) on an inmate of an alms-house or asylum or any establishment of health, education, correction, detention or internment which is under the direction, supervision or authority of the accused person, or on anyone who is under the supervision or control of or dependent upon him; or c) on a woman incapable of understanding the nature or consequences of the act, or of resisting the act, due to old-age, physical or mental illness, depression or any other reason; or d) by a number of men acting in concert, or by subjecting the victim to act of cruelty or sadism, the punishment shall be rigorous imprisonment from five years to twenty years.

(3) Where the rape has caused grave physical or mental injury or death, the punishment shall be life imprisonment. (4) Where the rape is related to illegal restraint or abduction of the victim, or where communicable disease has been transmitted to her, the relevant provisions of this Code shall apply concurrently.

=== Statistics ===
A study conducted in 2020 that the prevalence of sexual violence was 22%, the pooled prevalence was 14.1% for attempted rape, 8% for rape, and 33.2% for sexual harassment. The pooled prevalence indicated that the incident was the highest in female university staffs accounting 49%, and among commercial sex workers 28%. This shows that the prevalence of sexual violence and harassment is higher in workplaces.

Due to embarrassment and victimization, rape cases almost underreported in Ethiopia. In 1998, research was done in Addis Ababa among high-school students, founded that 5% of students reported being victims of completed rape in their lifetime, 74% reported unwanted sexual harassment, 10% attempted rape and 26% of respondents encountered rape more than twice.

According to study published in July 2019, 17.5% reported physical beatings within last year and 15.2% reported rape since they started selling sex. Female sex workers greater than 35 age are less exposed to physical beatings than those aged 15–24.

== Tigray War ==
Women and children typically targeted for rape and other sexual violence in the Tigray War, committed by the Ethiopian and Eritrean troops and the Tigray rebels. Since the beginning of the war in November 2020, there were 1,300 rape cases reported to authorities, many of whom were underreported. The majority rape incidents occurred between November 2020 and June 2021, appeared to be committed by the Ethiopian and Eritrean military forces.
