= Netsanet Workneh =

Ethiopian actor and filmmaker (1983–2026)

- ነፃነት ወርቅነህ
- Born: 11 April 1983; Addis Ababa, Ethiopia
- Died: 16 January 2026 (aged 42)
- Resting place: Holy Trinity Cathedral, Addis Ababa
- Education: Addis Ababa University
- Occupations: Actor; filmmaker; comedian; TV personality
- Years active: 2000s–2026
- Notable work: City Boys; Salnegirat; Yanchaw Leba 2 Mr. X Chombe
- Children: 3

Netsanet Workneh (Amharic: ነፃነት ወርቅነህ; 11 April 1983 – 16 January 2026) was an Ethiopian actor, filmmaker, and television personality. He worked on several major Ethiopian films, primarily within the comedy genre.

Netsanet began his acting career with a stage performance in the play Ye Dawit Enzira. He later gained wider recognition for his role in Fresh Man while performing at the Hager Fikir Theatre. During his early career, he also appeared in numerous sketch comedy productions before transitioning into the film industry.

He went on to feature in several successful Ethiopian films, including City Boys, Salnegirat, Yanchaw Leba 2, Mr. X, and Chombe, establishing himself as a prominent figure in contemporary Ethiopian cinema.

From 2017, Netsanet produced and hosted the game show Yebeteseb Chewata, which aired on EBS TV.

Netsanet died on 16 January 2026 following an unspecified illness. He had reportedly experienced long-term health complications that required hospitalisation prior to his death. News of his death was widely circulated in the media and was met with shock and tributes from fans, colleagues, and members of the Ethiopian entertainment community. He was buried at Holy Trinity Cathedral in Addis Ababa on 18 January 2026.

He is survived by three children.

== Life and career ==
Netsanet was born on 11 April 1983 in Addis Ababa. He developed an interest in the performing arts during high school, where he became known for portraying female characters in stage performances. He later studied theatre arts at Addis Ababa University . He later gained wider recognition, particularly for his portrayal of the Fresh Man character.

He subsequently built a career in Ethiopian cinema, working primarily in comedic roles and contributing both as an actor and assistant in film production. His major film credits include City Boys, Salnegirat, Yanchaw Leba 2, Mr. X, and Chombe.

In 2017, he produced and hosted Yebeteseb Chewata (English: Ethiopia’s Family Game), a family-oriented game show that combined entertainment with his distinctive comedic style. The programme aired on EBS TV.

On 16 January 2026, Netsanet died after a prolonged illness. Ethiopian media reported that he had been receiving specialised medical treatment prior to his death. He is survived by his wife and three children.

Tributes were widely shared across Ethiopian media and social media platforms. Prime Minister Abiy Ahmed expressed condolences, recalling Netsanet’s performance at the 2023 New Year’s Eve programme held at the Grand Ethiopian Renaissance Dam.

Funeral arrangements were organised by his family and colleagues at EBS TV, and on 18 January 2026, he was laid to rest at Holy Trinity Cathedral in Addis Ababa. The funeral was attended by family members, colleagues, fans, and government officials.

== Filmography ==
Source: Yageru
Title	Year
FBI	2010
Yanchiw Leba	2011
Mr. X	2011
FBI 2	2012
YaKen	2012
Balekelem Hilmoch	2012
City Boyz	2012
Taschershignalesh	2013
Sostegna Wegen	2015
Salnegrat	2015
Chombe	2015
Common Course	2015
Yanchiw Leba 2	2017
FBI 3	2017
Fikir Min Agebaw	2018
Classmate	2020
