= Madingo Afework =

Ethiopian singer (1978–2022)

Background information
- Born: Tegene Afework; 16 August 1978; Azezo, Gondar, Begemder Province, Socialist Ethiopia (now Amhara Region, Ethiopia)
- Died: 27 September 2022 (aged 44) Addis Ababa, Ethiopia
- Genres: Ethiopian music; Tizita
- Occupation: Singer
- Instrument: Vocals
- Years active: 1997–2022
- Labels: Nahom Records

Tegene Afework (Amharic: ተገኔ አፈወርቅ; 16 August 1978 – 27 September 2022), known professionally as Madingo Afework (Amharic: ማዲንጎ አፈወርቅ), was an Ethiopian singer. Born in Gondar, he moved to military barracks nearby in the region where he was given his name "Madingo" by soldiers. There, Madingo joined the military band Zema Leras.

Afework was widely known for his albums Siyame Atahulat (1999), Ayderegim (2005) and Swedlat (2015).

== Life and career ==
Afework was born in Azezo town in Gondar, Ethiopia on 16 August 1978 from his mother Hagernesh Wassie and Afework Mengistu. His family then moved to Debre Tabor to enroll him into primary education. During his childhood, he was influenced by several famous singers at the time, notably Elias Tebabel, Muluken Melesse, Meles Edeshe and Ephrem Tamiru, and many fans admired that Madingo had a capability to imitate these artists' songs.

At the age of 10, Afework moved to a nearby garrison where soldiers nicknamed him "Madingo". At the garrison, he was enticed to join the military band, Zema Lastas. Madingo released his debut album called Siyame Atahulat in 1999. In 2005, he released widely acclaimed album Ayderegim. After years long, Madingo came back with another album titled Swedlat in 2015.

== Death ==
On 27 September 2022, Madingo died after being hospitalized at a clinic near his home from an unspecified illness. It was stated that he drove to hospital where he was given some painkillers before he died at the scene. Prime Minister Abiy Ahmed expressed his condolences over his death, saying "I am deeply saddened by the death of artist Madingo Afework. He contributed enormously to his country [Ethiopia] in his life." Madingo's death was announced in the Ethiopian Press Agency. According to sources, his friend named EPD expressed grief to his death and condolences towards his family, friends, and close relatives. On 28 September, Embassy of Russia expressed condolences over his death, stating "He was not only a talented artist, but also a true patriot of his country. His work helped to strengthen the spirit of soldiers who were defending Ethiopia from its adversaries."

On 28 September, police investigation was launched over his cause of death. According to state media, he was driving to a private clinic in Lemi Kura sub-city of Addis Ababa around 7:30 am (local time). He encountered a physician to complain about his breathing problem. He died at 9:30 am where the police believed the physician gave him a painkiller. The police also announced that they would investigate the death circumstance surrounding a medical error.

A funeral service took place on 29 September in Addis Ababa. The farewell ceremony was conducted at Friendship Square accompanied by the country's public figures, government officials, families and fans. Mayor of Addis Ababa Adanech Abebe paid tribute to him after his death. His body was laid to rest at the Holy Trinity Cathedral with high profile government officials, public figures, and residents attending the funeral.

== Discography ==
Title	Year	Label
Siyame Atahulat	1999	
Ayedergem	2005	Nahom Records
Swedlat	2015	Nahom Records
