= Samuel Urkato =

Ethiopian politician

- ሳሙኤል ኡርቃቶ

Commissioner of the Ethiopian Federal Ethics and Anti-Corruption Commission
- Incumbent
- Assumed office 9 October 2021
- President: Sahle-Work Zewde; Taye Atske Selassie
- Prime Minister: Abiy Ahmed
- Preceded by: Tsega Arage

Minister of Science and Higher Education
- In office 18 August 2020 – 6 October 2021
- President: Sahle-Work Zewde
- Prime Minister: Abiy Ahmed
- Preceded by: Hirut Woldemariam

Ministry of Mines and Petroleum
- In office October 2018 – 18 August 2020
- President: Sahle-Work Zewde
- Prime Minister: Abiy Ahmed
- Preceded by: Melese Alemu
- Succeeded by: Takele Uma Banti

President of Wolaita Sodo University
- In office 2016 – October 2018

Personal details
- Education: Hawassa University; Mekelle University; Kangwon National University; Addis Abeba University; University of Massachusetts Boston

Samuel Urkato Kurke (Ge'ez: ሳሙኤል ኡርቃቶ ኩርኬ) is an Ethiopian politician who is serving as the commissioner of the Federal Ethics and Anti-Corruption Commission since 2021. He was president of Wolaita Sodo University in 2016 before becoming Ministry of Mines and Petroleum in 2018, and has been Minister of Science and Higher Education (MoSHE) from August 2020 until the ministry merge into Ministry of Education on 6 October 2021.

== Background ==
Samuel was born in Wolaita Sodo. He has a Bachelor of Arts in Economics from Hawassa University, Master of Arts in Economics (Development Policy Analysis) from Mekelle University, and attended a PhD exchange student program in Resource and Agricultural Economics at Kangwon National University, in South Korea. He attended a PhD exchange study at University of Massachusetts Boston in McCormack Graduate School of Policy and Global Studies, and completed his Doctor of Philosophy in the Addis Ababa University Department of Conflict Resolution, Human Security, and Global Governance.

Samuel became president of Wolaita Sodo University in 2016, before his direct nomination as Minister of Mines and Petroleum in October 2018 following national reform that held by Prime Minister Abiy Ahmed. On 18 August 2020, he became the Minister of Science and Higher Education following reshuffle of cabinet ministers. On 9 October 2021, he was elected as Commissioner of the Federal Ethics and Anti-Corruption Commission.

== See also ==
- List of Ethiopian politicians
