= Ethiopian Federal Ethics and Anti-Corruption Commission =

Ethiopian government agency

- የኢትዮጵያ የፌዴራል የስነ-ምግባርና የፀረ ሙስና ኮሚሽን
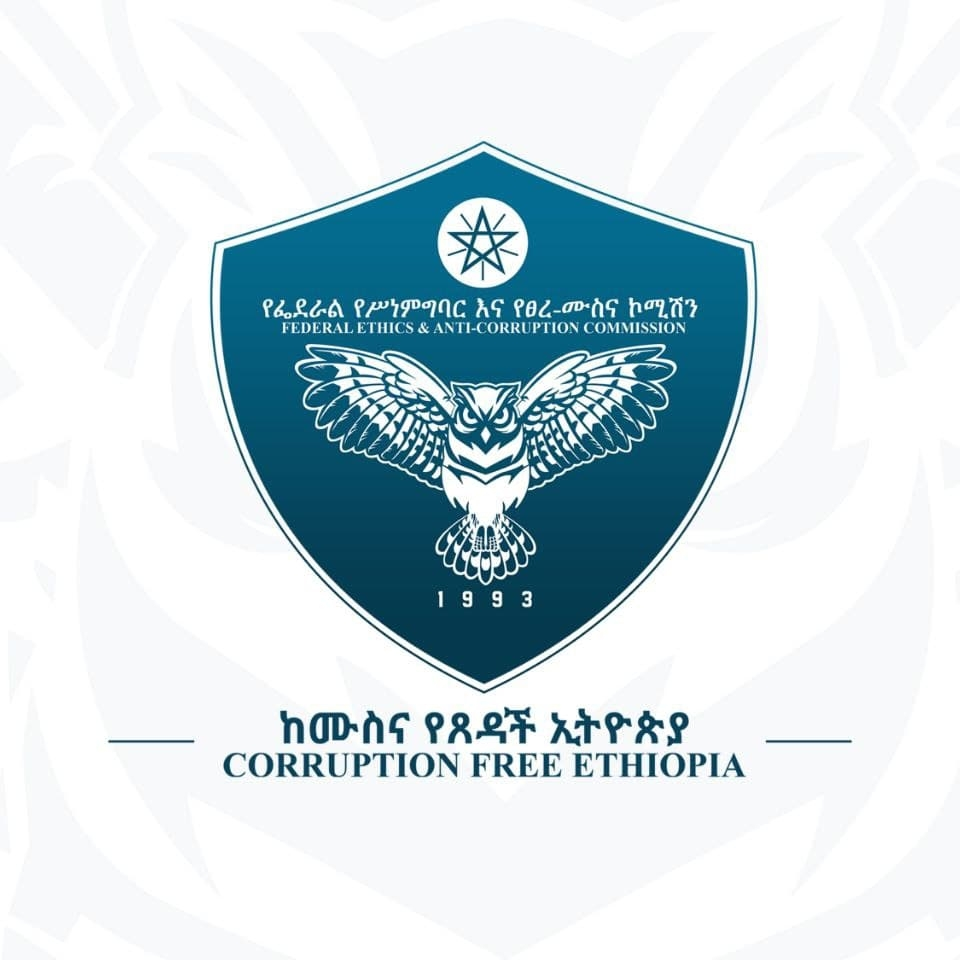

Agency overview
- Formed: 2001
- Jurisdiction: Ethiopia
- Headquarters: Addis Ababa, Ethiopia; 9.0169°N 38.7653°E
- Agency executive: Samuel Urkato
- Website: www.feacc.gov.et

The Ethiopian Federal Ethics and Anti-Corruption Commission (Amharic: የኢትዮጵያ የፌዴራል የስነ-ምግባርና የፀረ ሙስና ኮሚሽን; FEACC) is an Ethiopian government agency responsible for preventing and combating corruption and maintaining ethical governance. It was established in 2001 by Proclamation No. 235/2001.

== Task ==
The Ethiopian Federal Ethics and Anti-Corruption Commission (FEACC) duty is to prevent corruption in Ethiopia and is accountable to the prime minister of Ethiopia. The Proclamation No.1236-2020 promulgates the institution shall tackle corruption as means of tool for good societal moral and ethical value and sustain peace and democratic process.

In 2013, FEACC was charged the role with government officials, businessmen and high courts until this role is transferred to Federal Police Commission and the Ministry of Justice. The FEACC has power to register assets and disclose to revoke registry assets of government officials. The power is defined in Proclamation No.668/2010, where the President and the Prime Minister are obligated to register their assets to FEACC and visiting their headquarters.

== Structure ==
The FEACC is composed of various Directorates and three Services. The Directorates are as follows:

- Public and International Relations
- Ethics Liaison and Corruption Prevention
- Ethics building and Public Participation Coordination
- Training Study and Research
- Asset Disclosure and Registration
- Anti-Corruption legal Advice
- Implementation and Experience Formulation
- Regional Affairs Coordination
- Change Management and Capacity Building
- Plan and Budget Administration
- Human Resource Administration
- Procurement
- Finance and Property Administration
- Information Communication Technology
- Internal Audit
- Women and Children Affairs and General Services

The Commissioner's Office and the Deputy Commissioner's Office are also part of the Organizational set-up.

== See also ==
- Corruption in Ethiopia
