= Aregash Adane =

Ethiopian politician

Aregash Adane is an Ethiopian politician.

Despite the official policy of the regime and the efforts of the Revolutionary Ethiopian Women's Association to engage and integrate women in the political system during the Derg, she was in effect one of very few women in top political positions during the regime. In 1984, she was elected the only woman into the 29-member Central Committee of the TPLF, and remanined its sole woman member for 17 years until 2001.

She served as vice president of the Tigray State regional government as deputy of Gebru Asrat.
