= Tesfaye Sahlu =

Ethiopian author and comedian (1923–2017)

- Born: 27 June 1923; Kedu, Bale Province, Ethiopian Empire
- Died: 31 July 2017 (aged 94); Addis Ababa, Ethiopia
- Resting place: Holy Trinity Cathedral, Addis Ababa, Ethiopia
- Children: 2

Comedy career
- Years active: 1955–2004
- Medium: Television; radio; book
- Genres: Heritage comedy; stand-up comedy
- Subjects: Ethiopian culture; Ethiopian folklore; Ethiopian history

Tesfaye Sahlu (Amharic: ተስፋዬ ሳህሉ; 27 June 1923 – 31 July 2017) also known as Ababa Tesfaye, was an Ethiopian comedian, children's storybook author, and former singer. He provided entertainment for the Ethiopian troops of the Kagnew Battalion serving in the Korean War. He received awards from Emperor Haile Selassie, the Ethiopian Fine Art and Mass Media Prize Trust. He was most widely known for his children's television program on the Ethiopian national broadcaster EBC, where he coined the catchphrase, "Lijoch Yezare Abebawoch Yenege Freywoch" (roughly translated as "Children! Today's flowers, tomorrow's fruit!").

== Early life ==
Tesfaye Sahlu was born on 27 June 1923 in Kedu, a town in the Bale province of southeastern Ethiopia, to Egerssa Bedane and Yewenzwork Belete. He grew up in Harar during childhood years while attending French Mission School. He later moved to the capital Addis Ababa by the age 14, and enrolled Kokebe Tsibah School. His father, used to describe Tesfaye as "10 people in one" due to his multi-talented nature. Both of Sahlu's parents died during the Second Italo-Ethiopian War. Then, he joined City Hall Theatre along with Getachew Debalke, Getachew Mekuriya and Belay Meressa.

Tesfaye was one of few Ethiopian artists to go to Korea in 1951 and provided entertainment for Kagnew Battalion troops in the Korean War. For his work, he was given the military title of sergeant. Emperor Haile Selassie awarded him three times including a posthumous award for lifetime achievements from Ethiopian Fine Art and Mass Media Prize Trust in 1998.

== Career ==
With the opening of the Ethiopian National Theatre in 1955, Tesfaye comedic shows reached a broad audience. During this time he was involved in 70 stage productions and appeared on television. He played many roles, including female roles, reflecting a shortage of female actresses in theatre productions. For example, he played various characters in plays including Alula Aba Nega, Ha Hu Be Sidist Wor, King Oedipus, Dawitna Orion, Othello, Ya Zawntoch Kebeb and Enat Alem Tenu. In female position, he played prominent plays "Gonderew" and "Tela Shach" due to lack of female supporting role. Tesfaye also used musical instruments like washint, krar, begena, trombone, and accordion. In addition, Tesfaye also released single titled "Anchi Alem" and "Tsehay". Tesfaye's reputations and popularity increasingly grew in the theatre with audience share.

In 1962, Tesfaye run his children television program called Ababa Tesfaye's Storytime in Ethiopian Television. With presenting himself, it features folktales, comedy kits, dance, jigging and pantomime: by intimating people, mimicking animal sounds of various species. Tesfaye gained prominence with its catchphrase "Lijoch Yezare Abebawoch Yenege Freywoch" (translated as "children! Today's flowers, tomorrow's fruit").

Tesfaye published his first two children's books Lijoch, Ye Zare Abebawotch, Yenege Frewoch (1972) and Ke'Abbatoch Lelijjoch (1986), so hits is the carer of tesfaye sahlu.

== Personal life ==
At the time of his death, he was survived by two children and five grandchildren. Getachew Debalke, wrote a biography of Tesfaye despite discouraged by family members to reveal information.

== Death ==
Tesfaye died of natural causes on 31 July 2017 at his home in Addis Ababa. His funeral was held at the Holy Trinity Cathedral, where he was interred on 2 August.

== Filmography ==
=== Television ===
Year	Title	Role	Notes
1962–2004	Ababa Tesfaye's Storytime	Host, narrator	Broadcast on ETV

== Other ==
=== Theater ===
- Alula Aba Nega
- Ha Hu Be Sidist Wor
- King Oedipus
- Dawitna Orion (David and Orion)
- Othello
- Ya Zawntoch kebeb
- Enat Alem Tenu

== Literature ==
=== Book ===
- "Children! Today's flowers, tomorrow's fruits" (Amharic: Lijoch, Yezare Abebawotch, Yenege Frewoch) (1972)
- From Fathers to Kids (Amharic: Ke'abbatoch Lelijjoch) (1986)
- Ababa Tesfaye and his Stories (Amharic: Ababa Tesfaye Ena Teretochachew) Volume 1-4 (2004)

== Awards ==
- Golden Watch Award by H.I.M. Haile Selassie
- Lifetime Achievement Award by Ethiopian Fine Art and Mass Media Prize Trust
