= Asfaw Meshesha =

Ethiopian journalist and media personality (1967–2024)

- አስፋው መሸሻ
- Born: 1967
- Died: January 2024 (aged 56–57); Washington, D.C., U.S.
- Resting place: Holy Trinity Cathedral
- Education: University of Missouri (BA)
- Occupations: Journalist; talk show host; producer
- Years active: 2000–2024
- Known for: Nuro Be America; EBS Sunday Show
- Spouse: Selamawit Assefa (died 2010)
- Children: 1

Asfaw Meshesha (Amharic: አስፋው መሸሻ; 1967 – January 2024) was an Ethiopian journalist, talk show host and producer best known for working in EBS TV.

== Life and career ==
Asfaw Meshesha was born in 1967, and grew up in a privileged and influential family during the Ethiopian Civil War. He attended a school in Addis Ababa and became a member of the school debate team. In 1996, he graduated from high school and received a scholarship to study journalism at the University of Missouri. He completed his bachelor's degree in 2000 and returned to Ethiopia to pursue his career.

Meshesha began his career as a reporter for the Ethiopian Herald, where he covered various topics. Later, he joined FM Addis 97.1 Irie Music at 2:00 PM, and became the most famous radio host and personality. Asfaw then moved to EBS TV, a first private television network in Ethiopia. He created and hosted Nuro Be America ("Life in America"). Upon returning to Ethiopia, he created the EBS Sunday Show, a weekly talk show that features celebrities and politicians.

== Personal life and death ==
Meshesha was married to Selamawit Assefa, a popular Ethiopian actress, and they have a son named Samson (Japi) Asfaw (born 2004). Selamawit died in 2010 in a car accident. As a memorial, Asfaw founded the Selamawit Assefa Foundation, a charitable organization that supports orphans, widows, and victims.

In October 2023, Asfaw suffered from a stroke and was diagnosed with brain cancer. He underwent chemotherapy and radiation therapy, but his condition became aggravated soon. With $200,000 medical help of EBS TV colleagues, he moved to George Washington University Hospital in Washington, D.C. for specialised care.

Asfaw died from the complication and the matter of death was resurfaced on 13 January 2024 via social media. He was survived by his friends and family members. On 22 January, Asfaw's funeral service was held at Holy Trinity Cathedral before his body was transported to Addis Ababa and a farewell program held at Millennium Hall.
