= Ministry of Science and Higher Education (Ethiopia) =

Former Ethiopian government department (2018–2021)

- የሳይንስ እና ከፍተኛ ትምህርት ሚኒስቴር

Agency overview
- Formed: 16 August 2018; 6 years ago
- Preceding agency: Ministry of Education
- Dissolved: 6 October 2021
- Superseding agency: Ministry of Education
- Jurisdiction: Ethiopia
- Status: Merged to Ministry of Education since October 2021
- Headquarters: Ring Roads, Addis Ababa, Ethiopia; 8.984848°N 38.784553°E
- Minister responsible: Samuel Urkato (2020–2021)
- Deputy Minister responsible: Samuel Kifle, State minister
- Website: www.moshe.gov.et

The Ministry of Science and Higher Education (Amharic: የሳይንስ እና ከፍተኛ ትምህርት ሚኒስቴር) was the Ethiopian government department established in 2018 which has a responsibility to lead the development of science, higher education, and the technical and vocational education and training (TVET) in the country. It established by proclamation number 1097/2018 in October 2018. Hirut Woldemariam is the prior by leading the ministry since its foundation to August 2020. Samuel Urkato was the Minister of Science and Higher Education from August 2020 to October 2021, when it was merged into the Ministry of Education.

== List of ministers ==
List of ministers since its formation in 2018
No	Name	From	To	Prime Minister	President
1	Hirut Woldemariam	October 2018	August 2020	Abiy Ahmed	Sahle-Work Zewde
2	Samuel Urkato	August 2020	May 2021	Abiy Ahmed	Sahle-Work Zewde
3	Berhanu Nega	October 2021	present	Abiy Ahmed	Sahle-Work Zewde
