= Revolutionary Ethiopian Women's Association =

The Revolutionary Ethiopian Women's Association (REWA) was a women's organization in Ethiopia, founded in 1974. It was the first lasting women's organization of any note in the country.

REWA was the first lasting organization for women's rights in Ethiopia. While women had been granted suffrage in 1955, the Empirical Constitution had defined women as second class citizens legally under the guardianship of men, and the previous women's groups had mainly been charities for upper class women.

REWA was a national organization. Its task was to organize and integrate women in to the political system, to give them political ideological training, to educate them in accordance with party ideology, and to mobilize them for state service after the 1974 revolution.

Despite the official support for gender equality however, there were very few women on top levels in the Party hierarchy. In 1984, Aregash Adane was elected the only woman into the 29-member Central Committee of the TPLF, and remanined its sole woman member for 17 years until 2001.
