= Sisa (drug) =

Psychoactive drug

Sisa or shisha (Greek: σίσα) is a stimulant drug that became popular in Greece around 2009. The word 'sisha' is related to the Persian 'shisheh' meaning glass (pipe). The basic ingredient is methamphetamine, with additives such as battery acid, engine oil, shampoo and salt. It is also known as speed, crystal meth or simply "meth". It is used by many homeless people in Athens, due to the low cost of manufacturing. The drug causes dangerous side effects such as insomnia, delusions, heart attacks, and violent tendencies, as it is a highly impure and adulterated drug. It also has a unique side effect of cardiomyopathy. Routes of administration include smoking, snorting, and intravenous injection.

== See also ==
- Flashblood
- Changaa
- Jenkem
- Whoonga
- Ya ba
