= Federal government of Ethiopia =

National government of Ethiopia

- Emblem of the Federal Democratic Republic of Ethiopia since 1995
- Formation: 21 August 1995; 31 years ago
- Country: Ethiopia
- Website: Official website

Legislative branch
- Legislature: Federal Parliamentary Assembly
- Speaker: Agegnehu Teshager (Federation); Tagesse Chafo (Peoples' Representatives)
- Meeting place: Addis Ababa

Executive branch
- Prime Minister: Abiy Ahmed
- Main body: Council of Ministers
- President: Taye Atske Selassie
- Appointed by: House of Peoples' Representatives
- Headquarters: Niger Street, Arat Kilo, Addis Ababa; 9.0311°N 38.7639°E

Judicial branch
- Court: Federal Supreme Court
- Seat: Addis Ababa

The federal government of Ethiopia (Amharic: የኢትዮጵያ መንግሥት, romanized: Ye-Ītyōṗṗyā mängəst) is structured in a framework of a federal parliamentary republic, whereby the prime minister is the head of government. Executive power is exercised by the federal government. The prime minister is chosen by the lower chamber of the Federal Parliamentary Assembly. Federal legislative power is vested in both the federal government and the two chambers of parliament. The judiciary is more or less independent of the executive and the legislature. They are governed under the 1995 Constitution of Ethiopia. There is a bicameral parliament made of the 108-seat House of Federation and the 547-seat House of Peoples' Representatives. The House of Federation has members chosen by the regional councils to serve five-year terms. The House of Peoples' Representatives is elected by direct election, who in turn elect the president for a six-year term.

== History ==
Ethiopia has always oscillated between centralisation of power, this was accelerated under the 19th century emperors Tewodros II (1855–68) and Yohannes IV (1872–89). This was replicated in modern times under the Derg regime, after the fall of the Derg, the federalism introduced in 1991 by the Tigray People’s Liberation Front (TPLF).

Historically, the Ethiopian Empire, known as "Abyssinia" and "Ze-Etiyopia" called prior to the mid-19th century, consisted mainly of the Amhara and Tigrayans. These are northern people who share a similar language, culture and customs, who now make up c. 24% and 6% respectively of modern Ethiopia. Tewodros II reunified Northern Ethiopia from 1855, while his successor Yohannes IV embarked on a series of military campaigns between 1880–1889 to conquer and annex the southern and eastern regions, namely western Oromo, Sidama, Gurage, Wolayta and other groups, leading largely to the current national borders.

The inhabitants of these Southern states had different languages and customs; mostly Muslim and Pagan, but particularly the most populous group, the Oromos, 34% currently, occupied valuable agricultural and developable lands which now contain the capital Addis Ababa, the heart of urban Ethiopia and its industrial hub on traditional Oromo lands.

The southern peoples incorporated into the expanding Ethiopian state during the late nineteenth century had diverse languages, customs and religious practices, including Islam and indigenous religions. The Oromo, who now comprise approximately 34% of Ethiopia's population, inhabited fertile agricultural lands, including areas that would later form the site of the capital Addis Ababa. The process of conquest was accompanied by widespread violence. Contemporary accounts and historical records document mass killings of combatants and civilians, the enslavement of captives, large-scale land confiscation, and in some areas forced conversion of Muslim communities to Ethiopian Orthodox Christianity, most systematically under Emperor Yohannes IV (1872-1889). Some scholars, including Mekuria Bulcha, have argued that certain episodes of this violence meet the criteria for genocidal killing, citing motives of religious nationalism, military control, and economic appropriation of land and livestock. The applicability of the term genocide to nineteenth-century Ethiopian expansion is debated among historians.

=== Derg government and subsequent transitional government (1974-1995) ===
The centralised Ethiopian Empire under Haile Selassie was abolished following the Ethiopian Revolution, the Mengistu and communist Derg coup of 1974, replaced by an equally centralised Marxist-Leninist system, including the continuation of the military campaigns started by Haile Selassie in 1961 against the resistance within Eritrea, annexed in 1961, which persisted until 1991, and against the Somali Ogaden invasion of 1977/78.

Following the dissolution of the Derg in 1991, by the TPLF, which ended the Ethiopian Civil War and established independence for Eritrea, Ethiopia formed a transitional government along federal lines which lasted until 1995.

=== Federal constitutional government (1995-present) ===
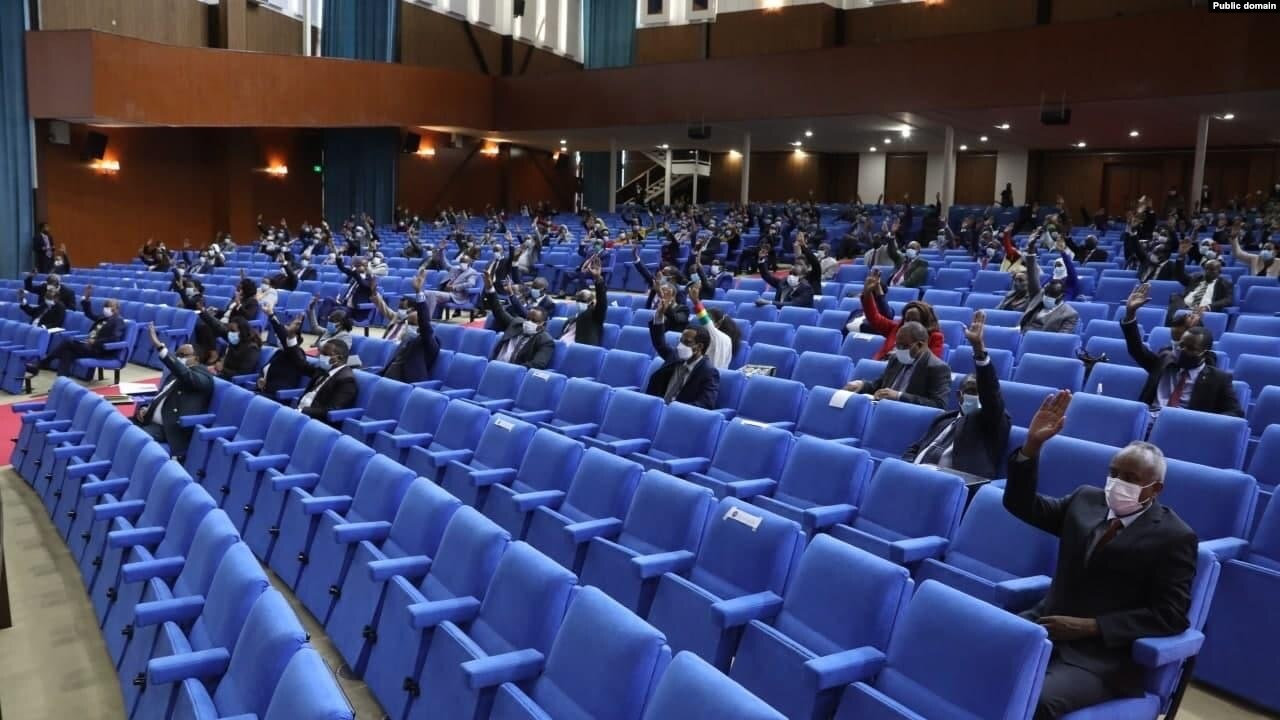
The House of Peoples' Representatives is the lower chamber of the Ethiopian legislature, as instituted by the 1995 constitution.

The 1995 Constitution of Ethiopia was promulgated by the Ethiopian People's Revolutionary Democratic Front (EPRDF), which enshrined a form of ethnic-based federalism, consisting of 11 ethno-linguistically defined regional states and 2 chartered cities. The states are: Afar; Amhara, Benishangul-Gumuz; Gambela; Harari; Oromia; Somali; the Southern Nations, Nationalities, and Peoples' Region; Tigray; Sidama; and South West Ethiopia. The chartered cities are Addis Ababa, the country's capital, and Dire Dawa. The federal structure was intended to alleviate the persistent historical ethnic tensions by establishing regional autonomy and a degree of self-rule. Article 39, Section 1 states: "Every nation, nationality and people has an unconditional right to self-determination including the right to section." Each ethnic territory was thus given the right to secede, which was welcomed by those federally-minded but proved controversial amongst supporters of Ethiopian nationalism and its diaspora, especially the previously dominant Amhara, who feared it would decentralise government and induce ethnic tensions.

After the 1995 general election, Meles Zenawi, chairman of the Tigray People's Liberation Front, was appointed as Prime Minister. His government reversed the communist policies of the Derg and progressively encouraged privatization of government companies, farms, lands, and investments. This socioeconomic and partial political liberalization within a federalist system, combined with a return of considerable foreign investment led to significant economic growth, double-digit in his last 9 years until his sudden death in 2012. His deputy Hailemariam Desalegn, assumed power, which was only confirmed by elections in 2015. Under the leadership of Hailemariam, the Tigray People's Liberation Front and EPRDF maintained the same policies until 2018, earning Ethiopia the status as the fastest-growing economy in Africa. While Meles introduced many social reforms, there was still a notable degree of political and media suppression, coupled with allegations of election meddling in 2005. The TPLF, drawn from only 6% of the population, was seen as unduly favourable to Tigrayans, with resentment from the majority Oromos (34%) and Amhara (27%), with ethnic clashes also involving Ethiopian Somalis (6%).

==== Recent reform ====
In order to combat corruption in the federal government and other factors, there have been several reforms to the lower-level organization of the Ethiopian federal government.

Since 2008, the federal government has adopted several techniques inherited from business management, such as business process re-engineering and the use of balanced scorecards, which have demonstrated little to no positive effect on the effectiveness of civil service.

== Legislative branch ==
The Federal Parliamentary Assembly has two chambers: the House of Peoples' Representatives (Yehizbtewekayoch Mekir Bet) with 547 members, elected for five-year terms in single-seat constituencies; and the House of the Federation (Yefedereshn Mekir Bet) with 112 members, one for each nationality, and one additional representative for each one million of its population, designated by the regional councils, which may elect them themselves or through popular elections.

== Judicial branch ==
The president and vice president of the Federal Supreme Court are recommended by the prime minister and appointed by the House of Peoples' Representatives; for other federal judges, the prime minister submits candidates selected by the Federal Judicial Administrative Council to the House of Peoples' Representatives for appointment. In May 2007, the Ethiopian Federal courts received the Technology in Government in Africa (TIGA) award that is provided by Economic Commission for Africa (ECA) and the Canadian e-Policy Resource Center (CePRC).

With regard to the legal profession, although organizations such as the Ethiopian Lawyers' Association (formerly the Ethiopian Bar Association) and the Ethiopian Women Lawyers Association (EWLA) are in existence, there is no clear indication as to how demographic groups, such as women, have fared in the legal field.

== Executive branch ==
Main office-holders
Office	Name	Party	Since
President	Taye Atske Selassie	Independent	7 October 2024
Prime Minister	Abiy Ahmed	Prosperity Party	2 April 2018

The House of Peoples' Representatives elects the president for a six-year term. The prime minister is designated by the party in power following legislative elections. The Council of Ministers, according to the 1995 constitution, consists of the Prime Minister, the Deputy Prime Minister, other Ministers and other members as determined and approved by the House of Peoples' Representatives. Among the ministries are the Ministry of Finance and Economic Development, the Ministry of Foreign Affairs, the Ministry of Agriculture and Rural Development, the Ministry of Water Resources, the Ministry of Health, and the Ministry of the Environment.

=== Civil servants ===
The federal government of Ethiopia employs over two million civil servants, constituting a large public sector. The public service system is organized into ministries, bureaus, and agencies. The Ethiopian Civil Service Commission (CSC) oversees the public sector.

== Administrative divisions ==
Map of the administrative divisions of Ethiopia, as of November 2023. In this map, "AA" refers to Addis Ababa and "DD" refers to Dire Dawa.

Ethiopia is divided into 12 ethno-linguistically based regional states and 2 chartered cities. The states are:

1. Tigray
2. Afar
3. Amhara
4. Benishangul/Gumaz
5. Somali
6. Oromia
7. Gambela
8. South West Ethiopia Peoples'
9. South Ethiopia Regional State
10. Central Ethiopia Regional State
11. Sidama
12. Harari

The chartered cities are Addis Ababa, the country's capital, and Dire Dawa.

== Corruption ==
The federal government of Ethiopia has received significant and corroborated allegations of corruption, such as in the tax revenue sector. Between 2004 and 2013, the federal government of Ethiopia lost 2.5 billion dollars in government revenue via illicit financial flows.

=== Federal Ethics and Anti-Corruption Commission ===
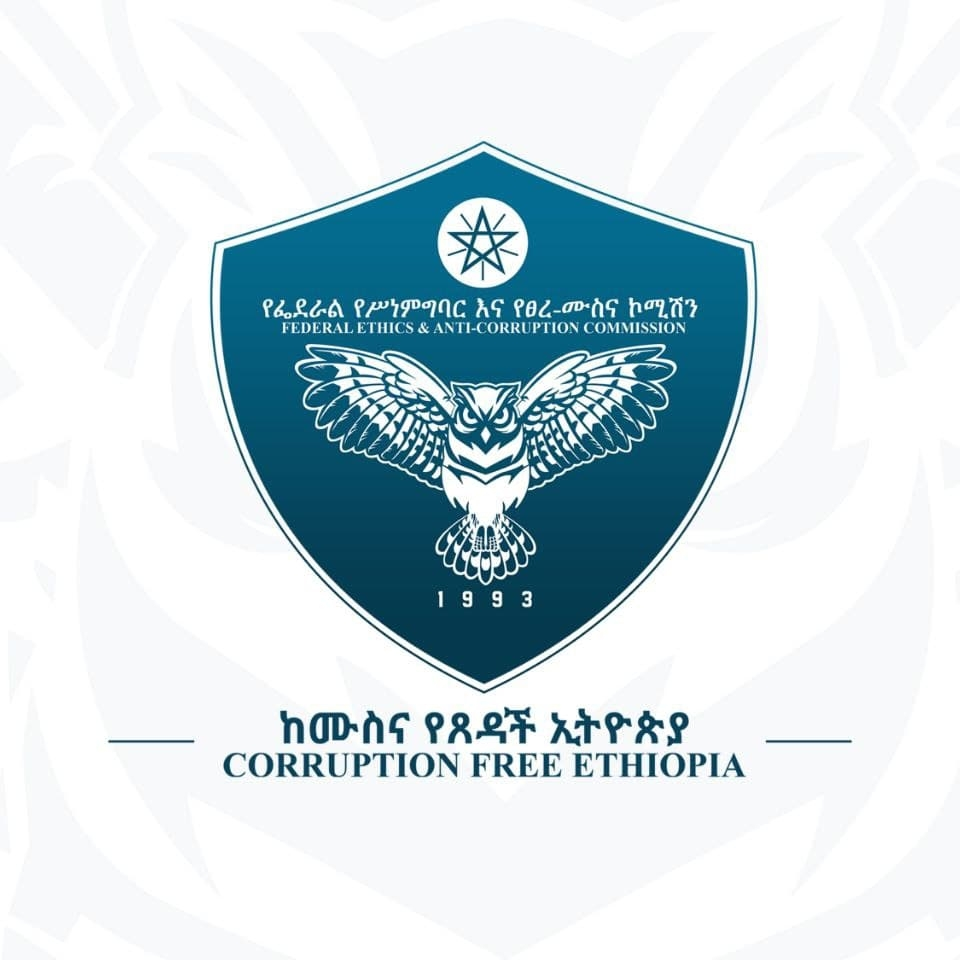
The Federal Ethics and Anti-Corruption Commission

Ethiopia established the Federal Ethics and Anti-Corruption Commission (FEACC) in 2001 which operated under the federal level with the multi-purpose role of prosecutorial and law enforcement powers, educating on corruption and prevention, investigation, prosecution, and asset recovery from corruption.

Ethiopia also implements the Revised Federal Ethics and Anti-corruption Commission Establishment Proclamation and Revised Anti-Corruption Law to crimininalize attempted corruption and extortion and Criminal Code 2004 for active and passive bribery, money laundering and bribing foreign official.
