= Ethiopian Criminal Code =

Criminal code of Ethiopia

The Ethiopian Criminal Code is the criminal code of Ethiopia. Stemmed from the 1957 Penal Code of the Ethiopian Empire, the FDRE regime repealed both the Ethiopian Empire and the Derg revised Proclamation in 1982 from 9 May 2005 and has 865 Articles. Furthermore, the Code obligated to ensure order, peace and security of the country, its people, and inhabitants for the public good.

== 1957 Penal Code ==
The Ethiopian Civil Code entered into legal phenomena from 1957 Penal Code. During this period, radical, political, economic and social changes have taken place in Ethiopia. Among the changes, the Constitution was ratified by international agreement that enshrined equality between, religion, nations, citizens and residents, human rights, and most of all, the rights of social groups like women and children.

The Penal Code did not addressed crime such as hijacking aircraft, cyberattacks and money laundering by early stages.

== FDRE Proclamation ==
Under FDRE Pro cited as "the Criminal Code of the Federal Democratic Republic of Ethiopia" in 2004, the new proclamation act repealed the 1957 Penal Code of the Ethiopian Empire, the Revised Special Penal Code of the Provisional Military Administration Council 1982 and Proclamation No. 214/1982 from 9 May 2005. The Criminal Code has 865 Articles.

The Article 3 of this Code shall not affect the application of special laws and regulations.

=== Objectives ===
The purpose of the FDRE Criminal Code is to ensure order, peace and the security of the country, its people, and inhabitants for the public good.

=== Principle of legality ===
The Ethiopian Criminal Code specifies various crimes and penalties and measure applicable to criminals. The Court, do not treat as a crime that are outside law measures, and do not impose penalty that is not prescribed by the law nor creating crime by analogy. These provisions shall not prevent the Court from interpreting the law. The Court allowed to interpret law according to its "spirit", and in accordance with legislative embodying to achieve the purpose of its view. The Code also obligated to not tried and punish a person again which already subjected to other measures and acquitted by final decision in accordance with the law.

=== Other penal legislation ===
The general principle embodied in the Code should be applicable to those laws and regulations except as otherwise expressly provided therein.

=== Equality before the law ===
These criminal law applies accordingly without any outer discrimination regards to persons, social conditions, race, nation, nationality, social origin, color, sex, language, religion, political or other opinion, property, birth or other status. These derived from immunities sanctioned by public international and constitutional law, or relate gravity, degree of crime and guilt, the age of circumstances or special personal characteristics of the criminal, and the social danger which he/she represents.
