= Holy Trinity Cathedral, Addis Ababa =

Cathedral of the Ethiopian Orthodox Tewahedo Church

Holy Trinity Cathedral
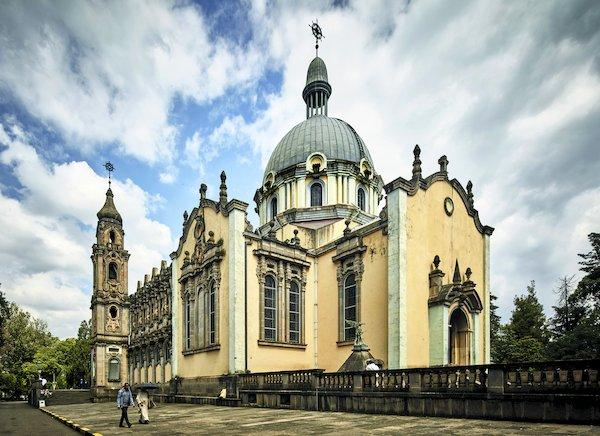

Religion
- Affiliation: Ethiopian Orthodox Tewahedo Church
- Rite: Alexandrian
- Status: Active

Location
- Location: Arat Kilo, Addis Ababa, Ethiopia
- Interactive map of Holy Trinity Cathedral
- Coordinates: 9.030799°N 38.766562°E

Architecture
- Type: Basilica
- Established: 22 December 1931; 94 years ago
- Completed: 1942

Holy Trinity Cathedral (Amharic: መንበረ ጸባኦት ቅድስት ሥላሴ), also known in Amharic as Kidist Selassie, is the highest ranking Ethiopian Orthodox Tewahedo cathedral in Addis Ababa, Ethiopia. It was initially built in 1931 under Emperor Haile Selassie before being disrupted by Italian invasion. It was completed in 1942 and built to commemorate the Ethiopian victory over Italian occupation.

It is an important place of worship in Ethiopia, alongside other cathedrals such as the Church of Our Lady Mary of Zion in Axum. The cathedral is noted for burial place of prominent people who did greater achievements from Ethiopia.

== Description ==
=== Background ===
The cathedral was established on 22 December 1931 under the guide of Emperor Haile Selassie. The construction was halted after Italian invasion of the country until 1942. Since then, the church was designated for commemoration of Ethiopian resistance fighters against the invasion. As with the building of any church, the construction of the cathedral was considered the spiritual duty of a person of wealth. Construction started with the blessing of a replica of the cathedral's Tabot, a replica of the Ark of the Covenant. The cathedral has a threefold division modelled on Solomon's Temple: The outer ring is where hymns are sung by the congregation; the middle circle is where holy communion is given; and the innermost circle, accessible only by the priests, contains the Tabot (ታቦት). The cathedral is an example of a square church, circular churches being the most common type.

Holy Trinity Cathedral bears the title Menbere Tsebaot ('Pure Altar'). It was built in 1942.

=== Cathedral complex ===
The cathedral complex also includes the 'Bale Wold' (Feast of God the Son) Church, which is also known as the Church of the Four Heavenly Creatures. This church served as the original Holy Trinity Monastery Church before the building of the cathedral and dates back to the reign of Emperor Menelik II. Other facilities include a primary and a secondary school, a monastery and the Holy Trinity Theological College, a museum and monuments housing the remains of those massacred in Addis Ababa by the Italians in 1937 in response to an assassination attempt against Marshal Rodolfo Graziani, Viceroy of Italian East Africa. In addition is the monument and tomb of the officials of the imperial government who were executed by the Communist Derg regime. Holy Trinity Cathedral is the official seat of the Orthodox Archdiocese of Addis Ababa. The Patriarchs of the Ethiopian Orthodox Tewahedo Church are enthroned at Holy Trinity Cathedral and all Bishops are consecrated there as well.

The church compound was the burial place for those who fought against the Italian occupation, or those who accompanied the Emperor Haile Selassie into exile from 1936 to 1941.

=== Imperial tombs and burials ===
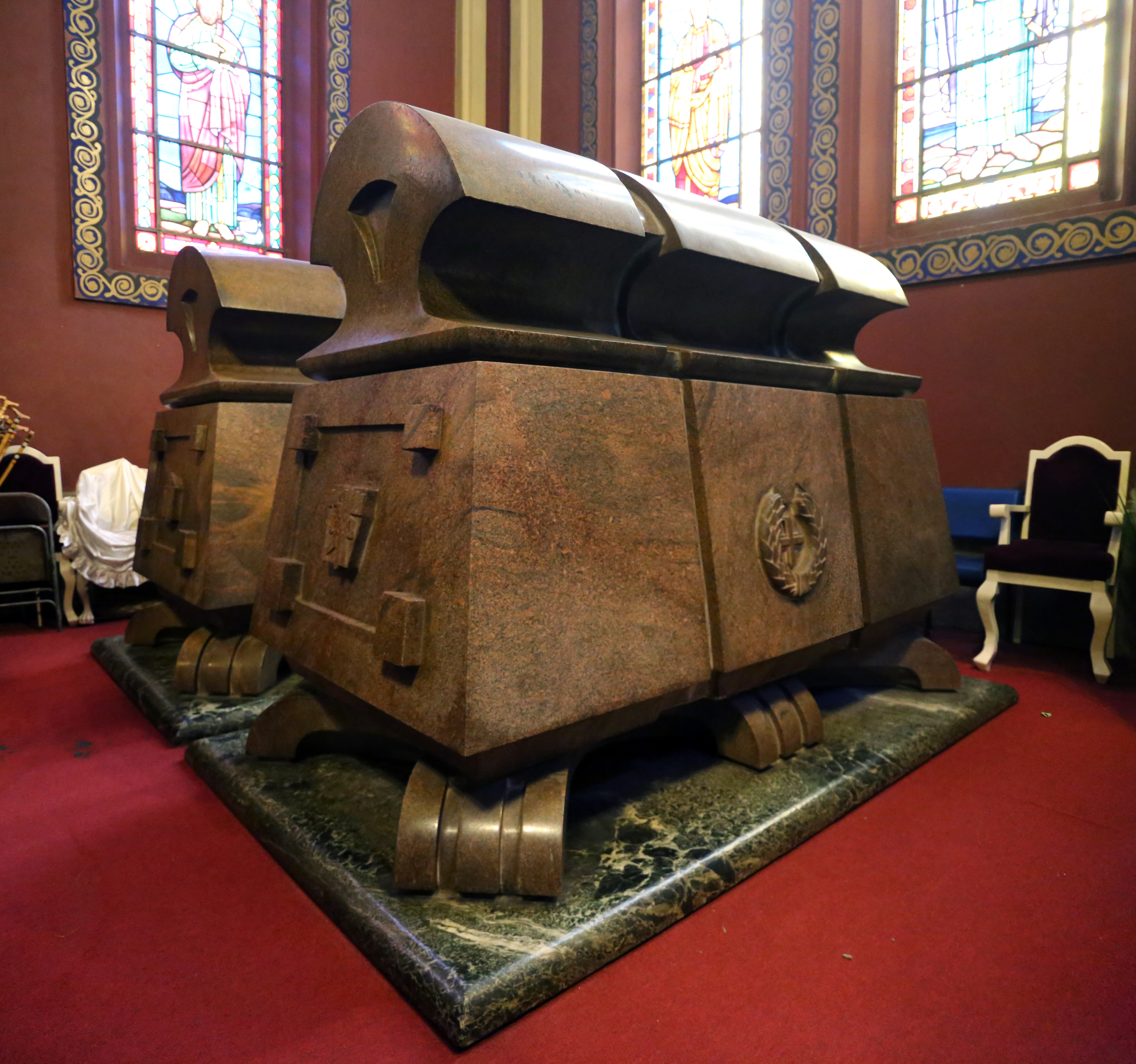
Sarcophagi of Haile Selassie and Menen Asfaw

The emperor and his consort the Empress Menen Asfaw are buried in the north transept of the cathedral. Other members of the Imperial Family are buried in the crypt. The High Altar of the cathedral is dedicated to 'Agaiste Alem Kidist Selassie' (Sovereigns of the World the Holy Trinity). The other two altars in the Holy of Holies on either side of the High Altar are dedicated to John the Baptist and to 'Kidane Meheret' (Our Lady Covenant of Mercy). In the south transept of the cathedral is the chapel of Archangel Michael, which houses the Tabot of St. Michael the Archangel, which was returned to Ethiopia in February 2002 after being discovered in Edinburgh. (Note: This relic was taken by British forces from the mountain citadel of Magdalla in 1868 during their campaign against Emperor Tewodros II.)

The tombs of Haile Selassie, Menen Asfaw, and other members of the Imperial Family are inside Holy Trinity Cathedral. Patriarchs, Abuna Takla Haymanot and Abune Paulos of the Ethiopian Orthodox Tewahedo Church, are buried in the churchyard, as is the famous British suffragette and anti-fascist activist Sylvia Pankhurst. Prime Minister Meles Zenawi and other prominent Ethiopians are also buried there.

== Gallery ==
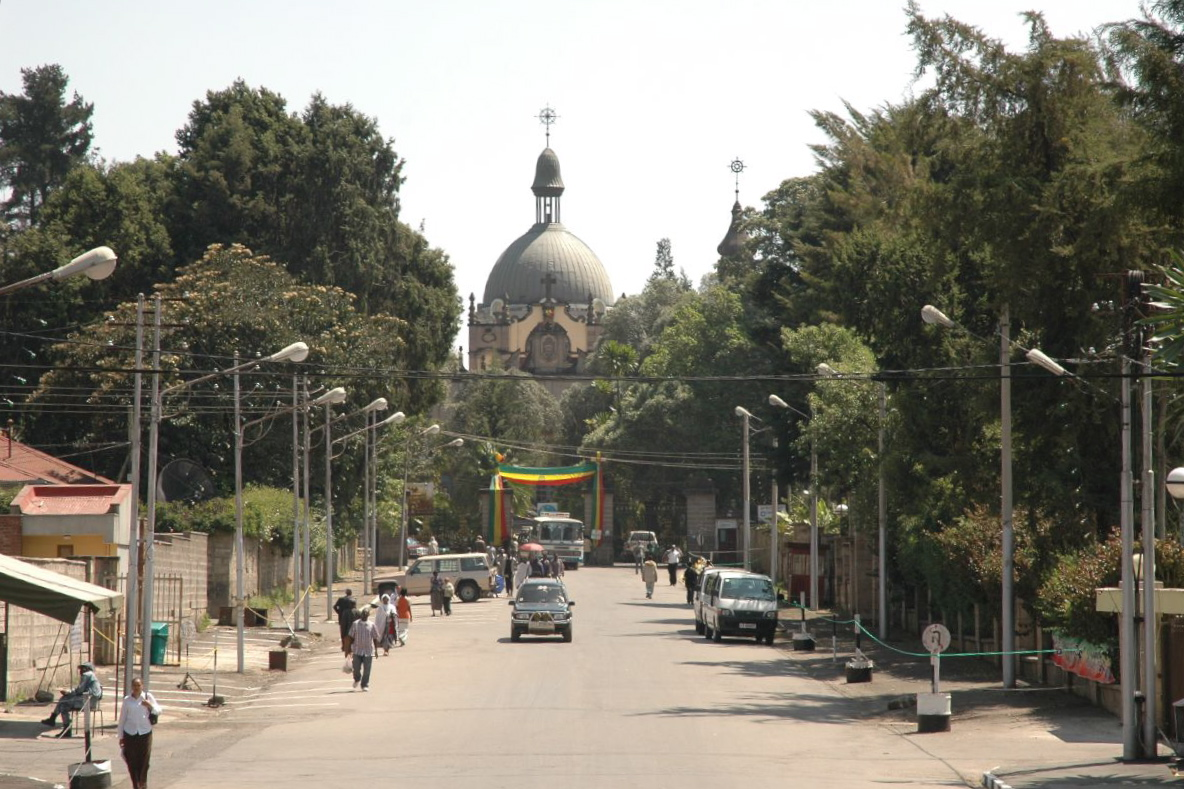
Entrance of the Holy Trinity Cathedral

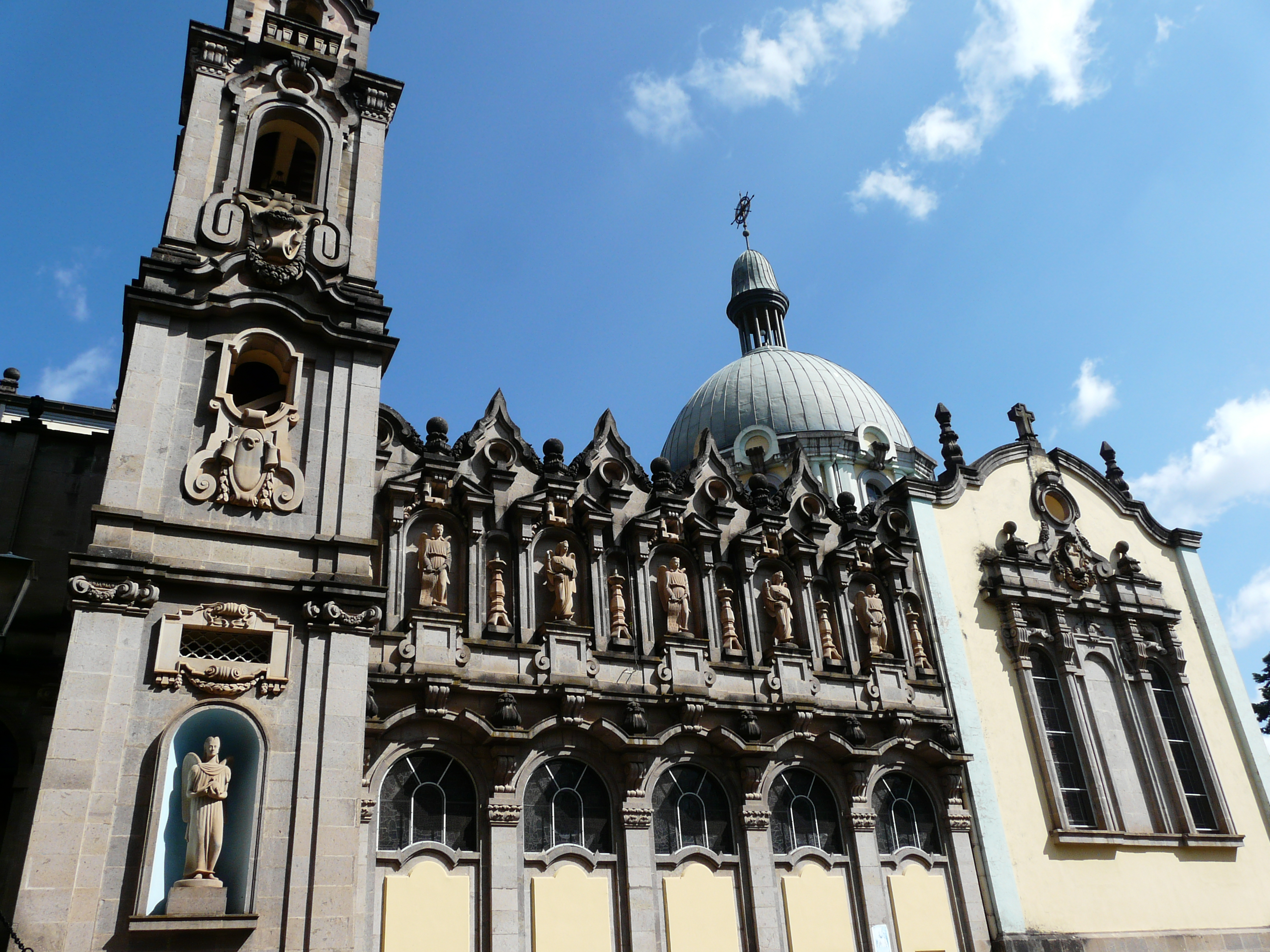
In closest view of the church

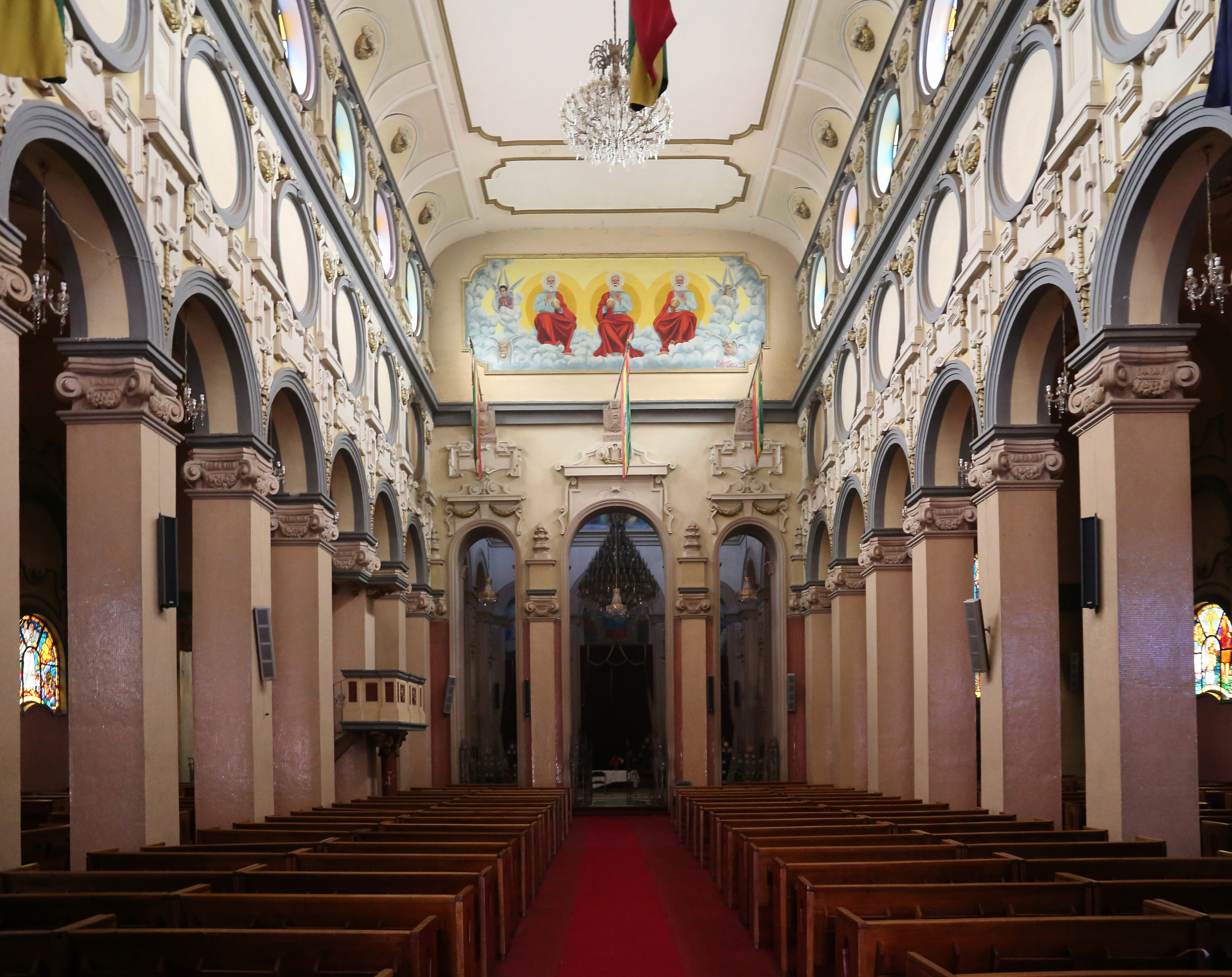
Interior of the cathedral

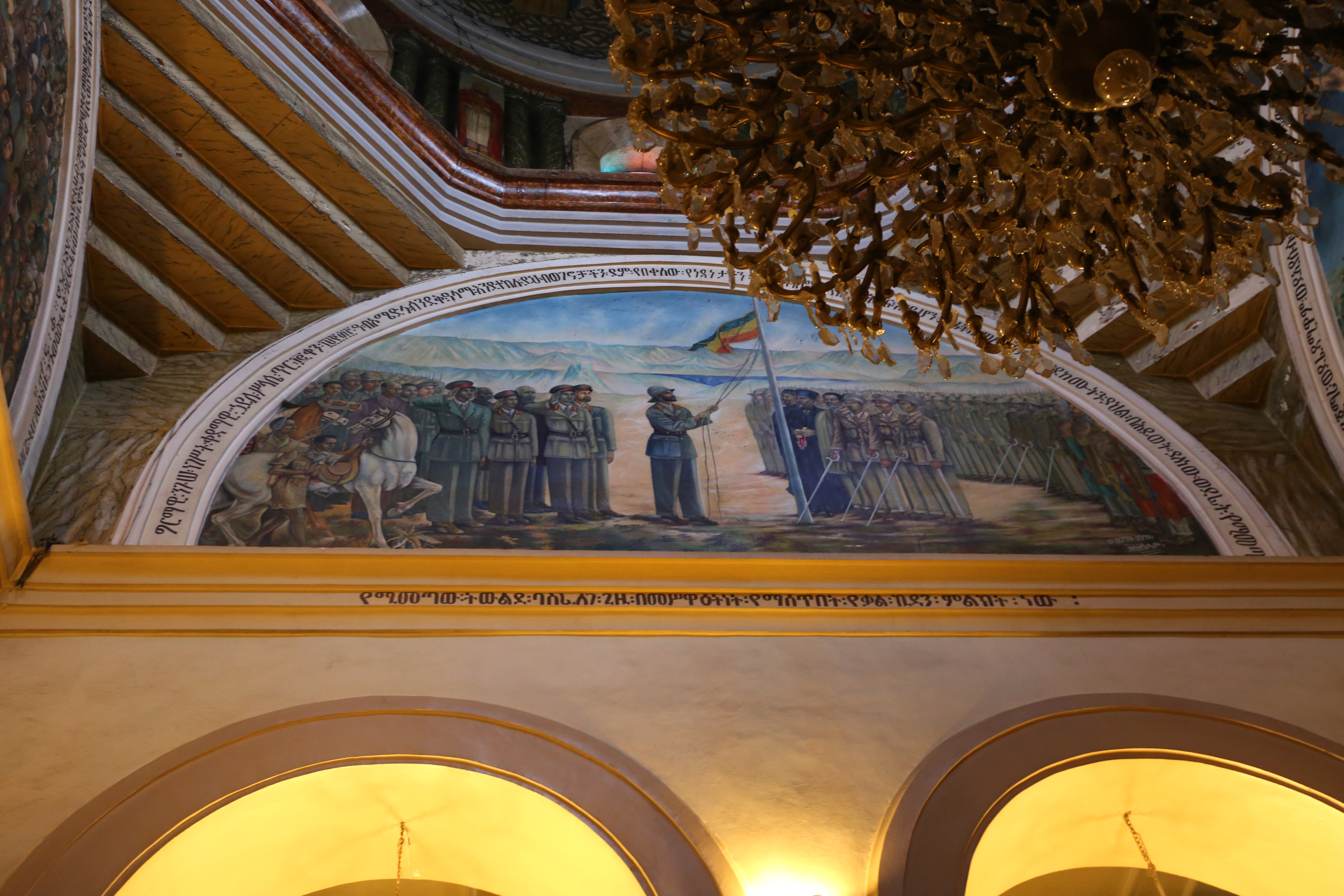
Interior painting showing Haile Selassie hoisting flag of Ethiopia

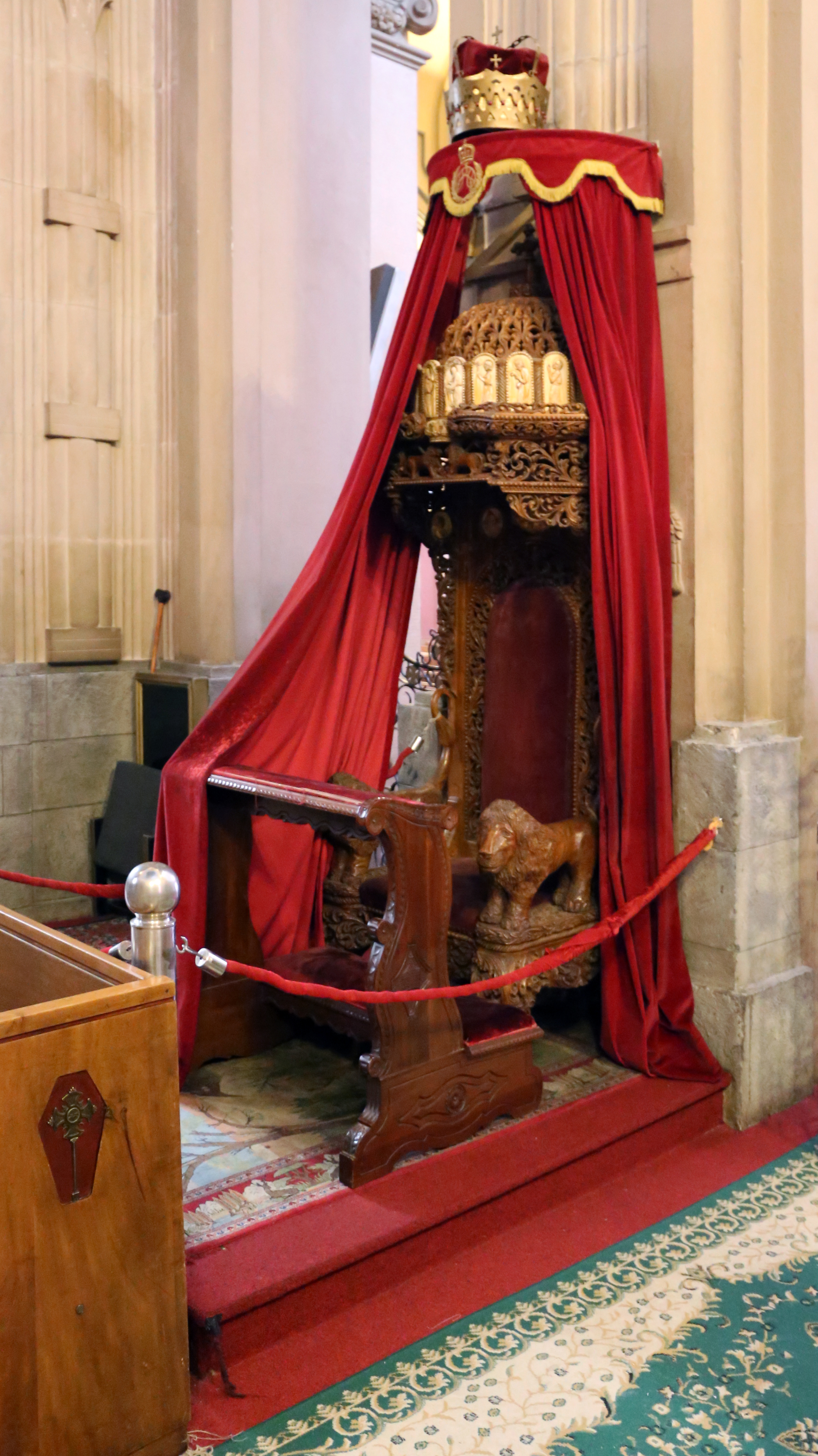
Throne of Haile Selassie and his wife Menen Asfaw

== Sources ==
- Prouty, Chris (1994). Historical Dictionary of Ethiopia and Eritrea (2nd ed.). Metuchen, New Jersey: Scarecrow Press. ISBN 0810826631.
- Prunier, Gérard; Ficquet, Éloi (2015). Understanding Contemporary Ethiopia. Oxford University Press. ISBN 978-1-84904-261-1.
