= Courts of Ethiopia =

Court structure and function in Ethiopia

Courts in Ethiopia are divided into three-level structures: the State Supreme Court (which also incorporates a cassation bench to review fundamental error of state law), High Courts and the First Instance Courts. State Courts are represented in every region of Ethiopia and have a seat in each capital city. The FDRE Constitution provides judicial review to the Federal Supreme Court, delegated by the State Supreme Court, Federal High Courts and Federal First Instance Courts respectively.

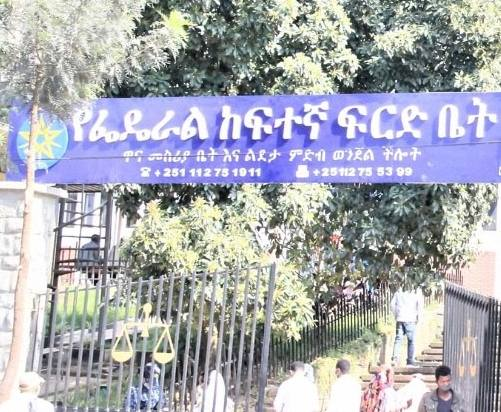
The Federal Supreme Court is the highest court in Ethiopia, delegated by the State Supreme Court, the Federal High Courts (headquarter pictured) and the Federal First Instance Courts respectively.

Municipal courts in chartered cities such as Addis Ababa have two courts exercising municipal function: the First Instance City Courts and Appellate Courts, establishing judicial divisions – the Labor Relations Board, Civil Service Tribunal, Tax Appeal Commission, and Urban Land Clearance Matters Appeal Commission. Likewise, the municipal jurisdiction also similarly followed by Oromia Regional State that has more than 10,000 people in its cities. There is no Supreme Court in municipal administration despite cassation bench included in Appellate Court.

Besides, the FDRE Constitution also guarantees religious courts defined in Article 34(5) and Article 78(5). Social courts in kebele level hear property and monetary claims up to 5,000 birr, and can be heard by the First Instance City Courts. For example, Sharia law has been enshrined in both federal and state levels, despite obligated to follow disciplinary rule of ordinary courts and receive their budgets from the state. In Ethiopia, customary courts generally unrecognized by laws embracing traditional and local customs. They are followed in rural areas such as in Amhara (Shemagelle), Tigray (Bayito and Abo Gereb) and Oromia (Luba Basa).

== State courts ==
=== Structure and jurisdiction ===
The FDRE Constitution provided three-level court structure: the State Supreme Court (which also incorporates a cassation bench to review fundamental error of state law), High Courts and the First Instance Courts. The State Courts are seated in every representative's capital city in states, having final judicial authority over matters of State law and jurisdiction. The State High Courts seat based on zonal regions of states while First Instance Courts seat at the administrative levels of states.

The FDRE Constitution delegates the State Supreme Court and State High Courts the jurisdiction of the Federal High Courts and Federal First Instance Courts respectively. In order to grant right of appeal of the parties to a case, decisions rendered by State High Court exercising the juridical of the First Instance Courts are appealable to the State Supreme Court while decisions rendered by State Supreme Court on federal matters are appealable to the Federal Supreme Court.

=== Accountability and administration ===
The state court jurisdiction is subjected to federal processes; the state government also established the Judicial Administration Commission that views and safeguards the independence and accountability of State Courts. The President and Vice President of the State Supreme Court are recommended by the President (Chief executive officer) of the states and appointed by the State Council; all other state judges are appointed by State Council, and recommended by the State Judicial Administration Commission. The authority of judge's tenure guarantee exists in State Judicial Administration Commissions.

== Municipal courts ==
The Addis Ababa City Charter creates two levels of city courts exercising in municipal function: First Instance and Appellate Courts. It also established two judicial bodies: the Labour Relations Board, Civil Service Tribunal, Tax Appeal Commission, and Urban Land Clearance Matters Appeal Commission.

There is no Supreme Court in municipal jurisdiction despite cassation bench is included within the Appellate Court. Cassation review of the Appellate Court decisions can be brought before the Federal Supreme Court, which can decide jurisdictional conflicts between the city and federal courts. The Addis Ababa City Courts have civil, criminal and petty offense jurisdiction. The Oromia Regional State also has similar municipal courts in cities more than 10,000 people.

== Religious courts ==
The FDRE Constitution also provides independent non-state or unofficial laws based on framework of customary and religious laws in some field of social activity. Article 34(5) defined that "This Constitution shall not preclude the adjudication of disputes relating to personal and family laws in accordance with religious and customary laws, with the consent of the parties to the dispute. Particulars shall be determined by law." Article 78(5) of the FDRE Constitution also stipulates that: "Pursuant to sub-Article (5) of Article 34 the House of Peoples’ Representatives and State Councils can establish or give official recognition to religious and customary courts that had state recognition and functioned prior to the adoption of the Constitution shall be organized on the basis of recognition accorded to them by this Constitution."

== Social courts ==
Social Courts with kebele status hear property and monetary claims up to 5,000 birr. Social Court appeals can be heard by the First Instance City Courts; if an appeal in Social Court finds fundamental errors of law in reviewing a First Instance City Court, it can be grounds to lodge cassation before the Appellate Court of the City.

Sharia law is fundamental Islamic law and has been officially enshrined at both the federal and state levels. They are obligated to follow procedural rules of ordinary courts and receive their budgets from the state.

== Customary courts ==
Despite constitutionally defined, customary courts are not part of laws, or recognized by law. The authority of these laws stem from traditional and local customs, evolved from traditional elder councils, which do not have legal authority. However, they can still carry out moral duty and observed in rural areas of Ethiopia such as Shemagelle in Amhara, the Bayito and Abo Gereb in Tigray, the Luba Basa in Oromia.

== See also ==
- Judiciary of Ethiopia
- State courts of Ethiopia
