= Judiciary of Ethiopia =

The judiciary of Ethiopia consists of dual system with parallel court structures: the federal and state courts having independent administration. The FDRE Constitution vested federal authority to the Federal Supreme Court which is cassation division and presides determining and overturning decisions made by the lower federal courts with itself has regular division assigned to review fundamental errors of law. Article 3, 4 and 5 stipulates the governance of federal courts over national and international aspects.

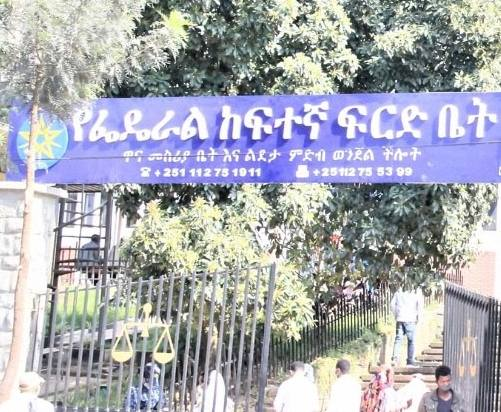
The Federal High Court seat in Addis Ababa

In recent years, the judiciary experienced lack of transparency and corruption and nepotism from several politicians and bureaucrats. This was observed during the 2005 general election which remained obscured to investigate the meddling. Despite remained low competency, the Ethiopian government fostered an improvement in the whole of judiciary bodies. Since Prime Minister Abiy Ahmed came to power in 2018, he initiated reforms including qualifying courts criteria and experienced judges, provision to courtrooms and drafting the Federal Court Proclamation and Federal Judicial Administration Proclamation.

== Structure ==
Ethiopia has dual judicial system with two equivalent court structures; the federal courts and state courts with independent structures and administration. The FDRE constitution vested federal judicial authority to the Federal Supreme Court and guarantees liability for the House of People's Representatives (HPR) to determine two-third majority vote for establishment subordinate federal courts, if necessary, extending in nationwide or in some part of the country. The Federal Supreme Court has a seat in Addis Ababa with national jurisdiction.

The Federal Supreme Court has established in five states where they may hold circuit hearings at any states and level or "area designated for its jurisdiction" if deemed "necessary for the efficient rendering of justice". Each High Court has civil, criminal and labor divisions consist of presiding judge with two other judges in each division. It has cassation division to determine the power and overturning decisions made by the lower federal courts; the Federal Supreme Court also has regular division assigned for fundamental errors of law. In addition, the decision of cassation division of Federal Supreme Court can be interpreted by federal and state courts.

The Federal Supreme Proclamation granted three principles to federal courts in subject matter decision: laws, parties and place, which stipulates the federal court governance over jurisdiction, first "cases arising under the Constitution, federal laws and international treaties", second over "parties specified by federal laws". Article 3(3) states the federal court authority over judicial system assigned by the Constitution and federal law. Similarly, Article 5 also codified the authority over civil law "cases to which a federal government organ is a party; suits between persons permanently residing in different regions; cases regarding the liability of officials or employees of the federal government in connection with their official responsibilities or duties; cases to which a foreign national is a party; suits involving matters of nationality; suits relating to business organizations registered or formed under the jurisdiction of federal government organs; suits regarding negotiable instruments; suits relating to patent, literary and artistic-ownership rights; and suits regarding insurance policy and application for habeas corpus."

Under Article 4, the federal courts uphold criminal jurisdiction; offenses over national and foreign state, international law, fiscal and economic policy of the federal government, counterfeit currency to emulate instruments of central government, security and freedom of communication operating regionally or internationally, aviation safety, foreigners defenses and victimization, illegal smuggling of drugs and hazardous substances and overall state and federal jurisdiction and connection of the government without responsibly and duties.

== Inefficiency of reliability ==
The Judiciary of Ethiopia has fallen into low levels of impartiality, integrity, and competency. Courts are subjected to long delays and intrusion from politicians and bureaucrats. According to a 2005 report on legal reforms, the judiciary was inaccessible, corrupt, politicized and under-funded. It lost independence in cases of state. For example, the Oromia Supreme Court judge Teshale Abera and federal judge Wolde-Michael Meshesha fled the country after call upon investigation on electoral fraud of the 2005 general election.

In 2006, Teshale told to BBC to plan appointment of loyalist judges, while Wolde-Michael said he received death threats to manipulate the death toll in the 2005 protests. Since 2000, the government aimed to reform the judicial system with the help of outside donor funds. In 2002, the Ministry of Capacity launched a Justice System Reform program which proposed a number of recommendations of 2005 baseline study report to all actors in the justice system.

Although consequent seminars were held for local and state judge, it did not yield the fundamental issues raised by baseline study. Henok Gabisa, a prominent Oromo activist from U.S., reported that the reform budget was used politically to intervene judges. Meanwhile, the judicial system has shown slight development.

== Recent reforms ==
Since 2018, the new Prime Minister Abiy Ahmed undertook reforms on judiciary body, political and economic sectors. According to diagnostic study by Legal and Justice Affairs Advisory Council, the previous government lacked freedom to participate the public and professional section. In the same year, the Advisory Council was established to oversee government strategy on the implementation of this reforms.

Under the Supreme Court President Meaza Ashenafi, three projects were carried out. The head of communication of the Supreme Court told the Ethiopian Insight that improvement are undergoing ranging from creating appropriate workplace and courtrooms to drafting the Federal Court Proclamation and Federal Judicial Administration Proclamation.

In the last fiscal year, the federal court planned to resolve 166,758 cases and gave judgments on 171,276 cases, surpassing their plan by 2.7%. This fiscal year showed an improvement on reduction of cases times earlier. The Supreme Court also allocated 4,000 federal court employee from the Civil Service Commission, drafting a relevant directive. According to Meaza Ashenafi press conference speech on 13 August 2021, the Supreme Court judiciary enjoyed 70% satisfaction rate among plaintiff.

Attorneys reported an improvement of judiciary and concerned the lack of service provision in the courts. Mulugeta Belay, best known for leading role in the TV series Chilot as a judge, told that the courts' neglected to he government and appointment and promotion of judges conducted without discretion.
