= Addis Ababa City Administration =

Municipal administration of Addis Ababa

Addis Ababa City Administration የአዲስ አበባ ከተማ አስተዳደር
- Formation: 1964
- State: Chartered city
- Country: Ethiopia
- Website: cityaddisababa.gov.et

Legislative branch
- Meeting place: Addis Ababa City Hall
- Mayor: Adanech Abebe
- Head: Mulugeta Tefera; Wossen Megra

The Addis Ababa City Administration (Amharic: የአዲስ አበባ ከተማ አስተዳደር, romanized: Ye’Ādīsi Ābeba Ketema Āsitedaderi) is a government executive organ of Addis Ababa, the capital of Ethiopia. It is governed by mayor, and the lowest administrative unit is the woreda, led by a woreda administrator. As a federal structure the woreda administration has an elected council.

== Administration ==
In Addis Ababa, the mayor is in charge of the administration of the city. The lowest administration in Addis Ababa is woreda, which is run by its administrators. Like the federal structure, the woreda administration has an elected council.

== Judiciary ==
There are three divisions of judiciary: the First Instance Court, High Court and Supreme Court, and Sharia Courts at both federal and regional levels having three divisions. Sharia courts are typically optional, and can be used for personal and civil case.

== Civil status ==
The civil status documentation requires essential component such as birth, marriage and death in the woreda of residence, where an individual can obtain birth certificate by registration of birth of a child. Residence identity card is strongly concerned for the same desk. The two documents are precedent to obtain national passport, which is issued by the Immigration Nationality and Vital Events Agency located at the city level. The fees of insurance is higher than for civil status, requiring 600 ETB, the latter one is nominal.

== Law enforcement ==
People sometimes have trouble calling police, which is the first point to report security incidents. Uniformed police often solve minor disputes and conflicts over farmland in the outskirts of the city, water and pasture and other communal assets. There is also police impersonation in Addis Ababa. In June 2022, two suspects were apprehended named Bayissa Gemechu and Merga Garuma in the fraudulent I.D. that is used to carry out acts of robbery Addis Ababa.

== Education ==
Primary and secondary education is the responsibility of Regional Education Bureaus. In each woreda, there are office departments that oversee/manage the education.

Enrollment in primary and secondary education is free at first, parents need to cover the cost of educational material and uniforms. From grade 1 and 4, the primary instructional languages are Amharic and Oromo. In grade 12, if students fail to enroll in university, they orient to vocational school based on curriculum based. A student can obtain certificate after one year of study and a diploma after three years.

At the level of tertiary education, certificates obtained through asylum have to go through an equivalent mechanism to be valid in Ethiopia. For foreign nationals, the admission of Ethiopian higher education is not automatically qualify, instead they undergo equivalent assessment or verification of foreign certificates with Education Relevance and Quality Agency (HERQA). Once the process is completed, a student will enroll to Addis Ababa or Ambo University.

They will have to sign a cost sharing commitment with the government for the tuition fee, 75% of whom covered by the government. Students assigned to any universities of the country by the Ministry of Education (MoE) after completion of grade 12 and scoring the minimum grade point average set by the MoE or through special placement exams.
