= Women in Ethiopia =

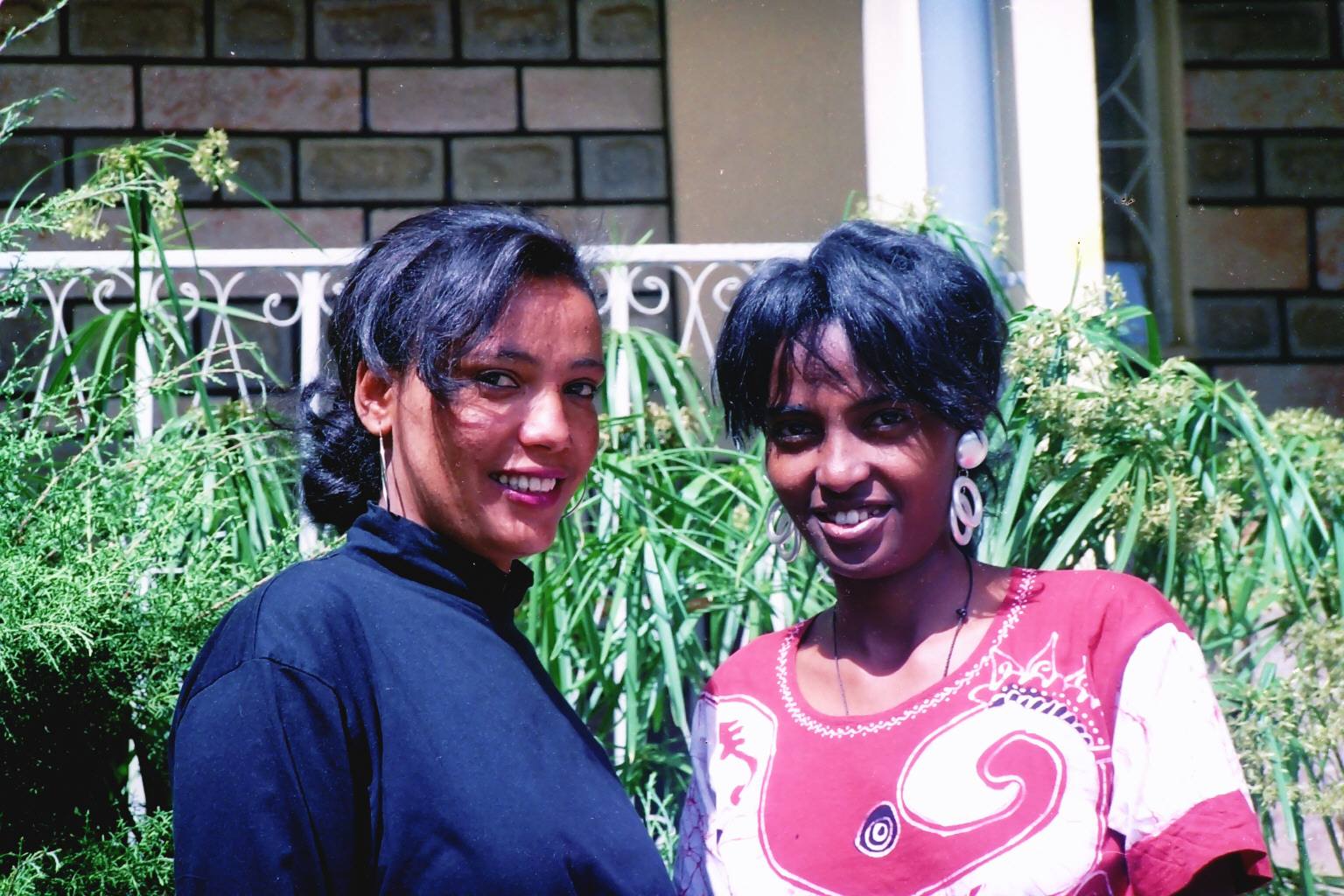
- Ethiopian women in Addis Ababa

General statistics
- Maternal mortality (per 100,000): 350 (2010)
- Women in parliament: 25.5% (2012)
- Women over 25 with secondary education: NA
- Women in labour force: 78.4% (2011)

Gender Inequality Index
- Value: 0.520 (2021)
- Rank: 129th out of 191

Global Gender Gap Index
- Value: 0.710 (2022)
- Rank: 74th out of 146

There have been several studies concerning women in Ethiopia. Historically, elite and powerful women in Ethiopia have been visible as administrators and warriors. This never translated into any benefit to improve the rights of women, but it had meant that women could inherit and own property and act as advisors on important communal and tribal matters. As late as the first part of the 20th century, Queen Menen, consort of Emperor Haile Selassie I, had a decisive role in running the Ethiopian Empire. Workit and Mestayit regents to their minor sons have been held responsible for their provinces. They owed their rights to landed property because of a special type of land tenure that expected tenants to serve as militia to overlords, irrespective of gender. In 1896, Empress Tayetu Betul, wife of Emperor Menelik II, actively advised the government and participated in defending the country from Italian invasion. Prominent and other landowning women fought against the second invasion in 1935–41. With the assistance of European advisors, women in the ensuing period were kept out of the army and politics, even as advisors. Instead, they were restricted to family and household work of raising children and cooking. With a steady increase in female representation in education, they have started to undertake nursing, teaching, and other similarly supportive roles. Over the 2018–2019 period, their gradual participation in state politics has been increasing at a steady pace.

== Social role of women ==
As in other traditional societies, in Ethiopia, a woman's worth is measured in terms of her role both as a mother and wife. Over 85 percent of Ethiopian women reside in rural areas, where households are engaged primarily in subsistence agriculture. In the countryside, women are integrated into the rural economy, which is often labor-intensive and exacts a heavy physical toll on all, including children. The Ethiopian Revolution had little impact on the lives of rural women. Land reform did not change their socioeconomic status, which was anchored in deep-rooted traditional values and beliefs. An improvement in economic conditions would improve the standard of living of women, but lasting change would also require a transformation in the attitudes of government officials and men regarding the roles of women.

Ethiopian women in traditional attire, 1966.

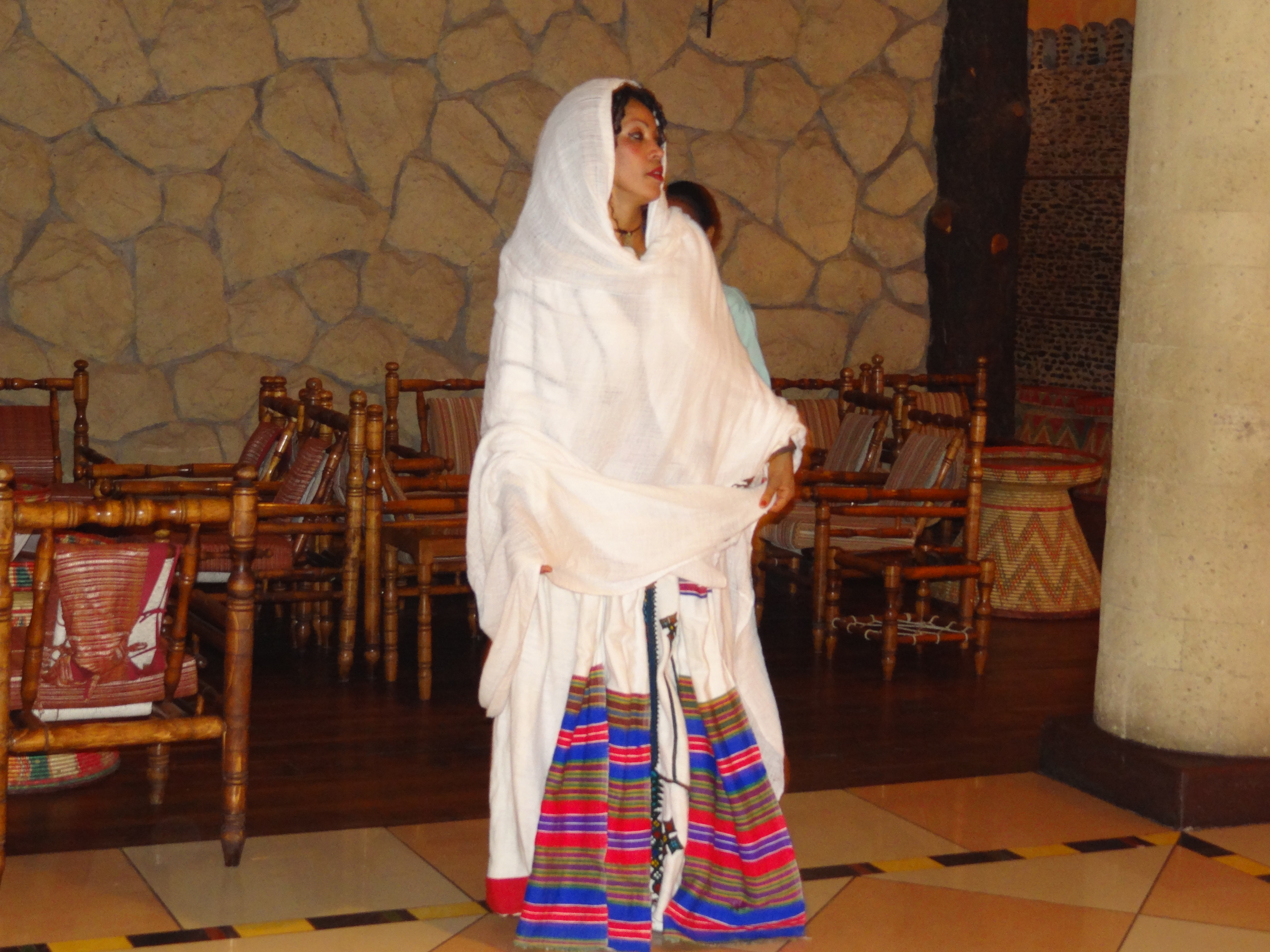
Ethiopian woman in traditional attire, 2011.

In urban areas, women have greater access to education, health care and employment outside the home. In 1976, around 40 percent of employed women in urban areas worked in the service sector, mainly in hotels, restaurants, and bars. A few women with higher education also found professional employment. Employment in production and related areas (such as textiles and food processing) accounted for 25 percent of the female work force, followed by sales, which accounted for about 11 percent. The survey also found that women factory workers in Addis Ababa earned about a quarter of the wages men earned for the same type of work. These differences existed despite a 1975 proclamation stipulating equal pay for equal work for men and women.

Following the Ethiopian Revolution, women made some gains in economic and political areas. The Revolutionary Ethiopian Women's Association (REWA), which claimed a membership of over 5 million, took an active part in educating women. It encouraged the creation of women's organizations in factories, local associations, and in the civil service. Some women participated in local organizations and in peasant associations and kebeles. However, the role of women was limited at the national level. In 1984, for example, the government selected only one woman as a full member of the Central Committee of the Workers' Party of Ethiopia. Of the 2,000 delegates who attended the party's inaugural congress in 1984, only 6 percent were women.

Under the Derg regime, the enrollment of girls in primary and secondary schools increased from about 32 percent in 1974/75 to 39 percent in 1985/86. The enrollment rate among girls in urban areas far exceeded that of girls in rural areas. The adult literacy rate also rose to 60 percent following a nationwide educational campaign. After the Derg's ouster, the adult literacy rate dropped to around 39 percent as of 2007; 28.9% for females and 49.1% for males. In response, the Ministry of Education launched a new educational campaign, which targets an eventual literacy rate of 95 percent and aims to educate 17 million adults.

As of 2008–2009, there was a steady increase in general enrollment and a decrease in gender disparity in access to education. The average annual growth rate of enrollment in all levels education was 27.2 percent for females and 33.7 percent for males, with an average annual growth rate of 29.7 percent for girls in Kindergarten, 13.4 percent for girls in primary school, 30.8 percent for girls in secondary school, 14.5 percent for women in TVET, and 21.4 percent for women in higher education.

After the formation of the Federal Republic in 1995, the Ministry of Women's Affairs was also established. As of October 2009, Muferiat Kamil serves as the Minister.

== Social issues ==
=== Women's health ===
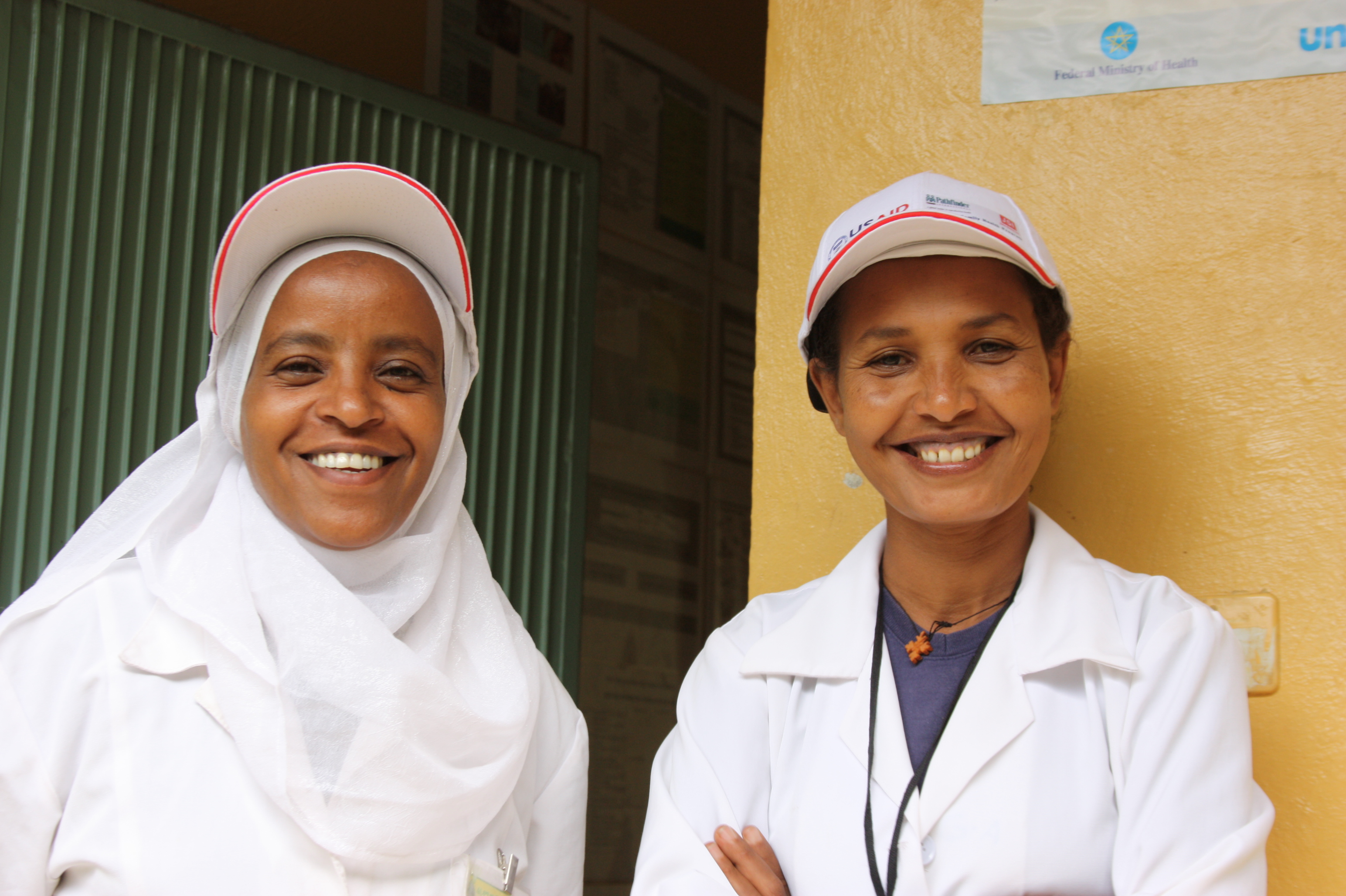
Community health care workers

The total fertility rate as of 2014 is 5.23 children born/woman. Although most women do not traditionally use contraception, there has been a marked increase in contraceptive use. Between 2000 and 2011, contraceptive prevalence increased from 8.2% to 28.6%. As of 2010, the maternal mortality is 350 deaths/100,000 live births.

The HIV/AIDS rate for both genders was estimated at 1.3% in 2012. More women are infected than men, and infections among women are partly due to their often lower socioeconomic status. Since sex between spouses is traditionally regarded as an obligation, the UNFPA argues that married women are at a greater risk of contracting HIV as they have less control over the frequency and nature of such relations.

=== Violence against women ===
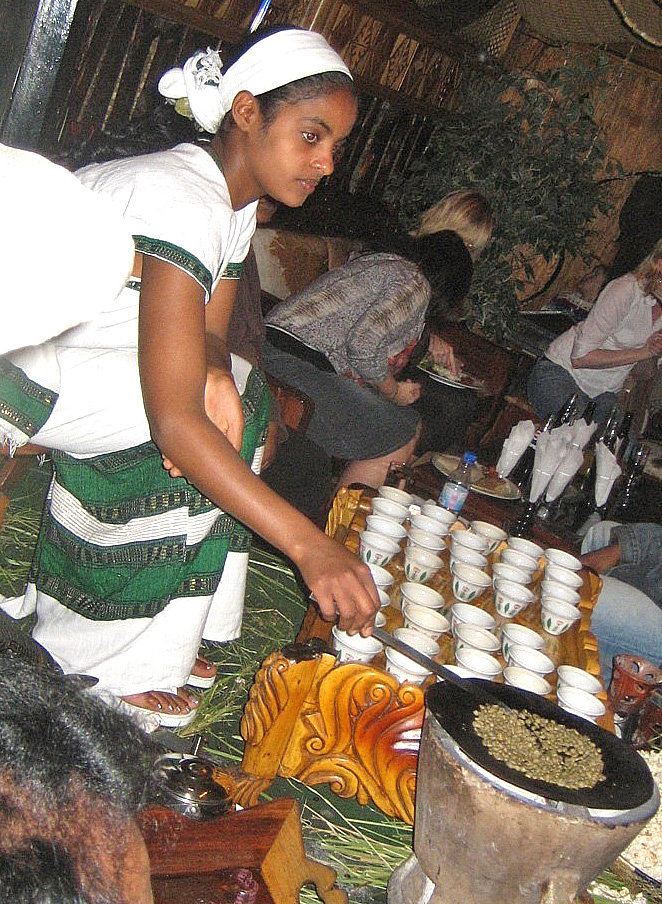
An Ethiopian woman preparing coffee at a traditional ceremony

An UN analysis of several international studies suggests that domestic violence against women is most prevalent in Ethiopia. Sexual violence is also reportedly common. Article 620 of the 2004 Criminal Code of Ethiopia, defines rape differently as compelled "sexual intercourse outside wedlock". Article 53 of the 2000 Revised Family Code of Ethiopia also stipulates that "they [the wife and husband] shall have with one another the sexual relations normal in marriage unless these relations involve a risk of seriously prejudicing their health".

This is interpreted as rendering marital rape a legally impossible concept. In a 2005 WHO study, 59% of women reported lifetime sexual abuse by a partner, while one third of women reported that during the past 12 months they were physically forced to have sex against their will with their partner. This was the highest prevalence of all countries surveyed.

During the war women get raped more often, according to Anger Callamard, "It’s clear that rape and sexual violence have been used as a weapon of war to inflict lasting physical and psychological damage on women and girls in Tigray". From February to April 2021, medical facilities in Tigray recorded 1,288 instances of gender-based violence. 376 instances of rape were reported at Adigrat Hospital between the start of the conflict and June 9, 2021.The TPLF soldiers are the ones raping these innocent women and children. There have been many instances of gang rape where women are beaten and raped throughout several days. A 21-year-old Bademe resident named Blen said that on November 5, 2020, she was kidnapped by soldiers from Eritrea and Ethiopia and held captive for 40 days together with an estimated 30 other women. Blen said that " They raped us and starved us. They were too many who raped us in rounds. We were around 30 women they took… All of us were raped". One woman said that she had been gang-raped in front of her kids.

=== Female genital mutilation ===
As of 2005, 74.3% of women aged 15 – 49 years had undergone female genital mutilation (FGM). The pre-marital custom is mainly endemic to Northeast Africa and parts of the Near East and has its ultimate origins in Ancient Egypt. Although legally proscribed under Articles 565 and 566 of the 2004 Penal Code, the procedure is still widely practiced, as it is deeply ingrained in the local culture. Encouraged and performed by women in the community, circumcision is primarily intended to deter promiscuity and to offer protection from assault.

According to Data from UNICEF, 25 million " In Ethiopia, 25 million girls and women have undergone FGM, the largest absolute number in Eastern and Southern Africa". Ethiopia has really high rate of female genital mutilation as it was a part of the culture for a long time. FGM risk varies according on a person's background traits. Greater danger applies to girls and women from rural regions and those with lower levels of education. In total, 65% of women and girls between the ages of 15 and 49 have experienced FGM. 47% of teenage girls between the ages of 15 and 19 have engaged in the activity. Ethiopia has made more headway toward eliminating FM than other high-prevalence nations in Eastern and Southern Africa. However, swifter action will be needed if FGM is to be eradicated by 2030. To achieve SDG objective 5.3, progress must be eight times quicker than that seen over the previous 15 years .

=== Bride kidnapping ===
Bride kidnapping is practiced by certain communities in Ethiopia, mainly in the Southern Nations, Nationalities and People's Region (SNNPR). According to surveys conducted in 2003 by the National Committee on Traditional Practices in Ethiopia, the custom's prevalence rate in the SNNPR was estimated at 92 percent. The 2004 Criminal Code criminalizes this practice, as well as other forms of abuse of women, such as child marriage, trafficking and sexual harassment, at Chapter III – Crimes Committed against life, person and health through harmful traditional practices (Articles 561–570) and also by other provisions (Articles 587, 597, 625, 635, 637, 648). Wife-beating is also illegal: Article 564 – Violence Against a Marriage Partner or a Person Cohabiting in an Irregular Union.

The 2014 gang rape and death of Hanna Lalango, as well as several other contemporaneous high-profile sexual assaults, prompted outrage from women in Ethiopia and internationally. The Yellow Movement was founded as a response to encourage women to speak out against sexual violence.

== Fighting for gender equality ==
Gender equality has been a problem in Ethiopia for decades but has had an improvement over the past three years since when Mulatu Teshome became president. The USAID is one of the worldwide countries that have done a lot in promoting women in Ethiopia and giving them an opportunity to live a better life without discrimination. Other international organizations working with Ethiopia include All African Women For Peace (AAWP) and many others part of the UN keeping their focus on advancing the participation of women in peacemaking and strive to stop early marriages and gender-based violence. In addition to the international help and participation, the Ethiopian government has also created some organizations such as the Ethiopian Women Association (EWA) which mainly focuses on stopping some dangerous cultural practises done against women and girls like FGM which involves removing some parts of their private parts and promoting their economic, social and legal rights.

Local organizations such the Women Fight in Harar, a small city in Ethiopia have been trying to fight any parents who keep their children from school and putting shame to men who attack, rape or try to rape girls and women. There are local organizations established in Addis Ababa, Setaweet; a feminist movement founded in 2014. Addis Powerhouse is a young women-led feminist knowledge production platform based in Ethiopia, which was founded in 2020.

Furthermore, Ethiopian girls and women's struggles and problems are mostly associated with social acceptance, access to education and child or forced marriages. To many, it seems the tragedy begins immediately when they are born because when a mother gives birth to a baby girl, the baby is considered as something unwanted but celebrations are made when a baby boy is born. Being regarded as vulnerable, parents give various excuses to keep their daughters at home doing housework instead of going to school.

A school-age girl is not allowed to attend school, with the excuse that she may be raped, abducted or harmed on the way to school. Boys are considered strong enough to protect themselves from any attack or harm. Girls cannot choose when and whom to marry. "Either the parents will choose the bride, or the groom will marry the girl of his choice" (Womankind). A woman who is a victim of rape will face humiliation starting from the police. Rape is not taken seriously and hence men are seen committing several atrocious violence against women, especially in villages. Although this practice is illegal, it is still happening.

=== Women's empowerment ===
Gender Equality and Women's Empowerment is a controversial topic in Ethiopia. More women in Ethiopia are committed to deal with everybody in the family and village/community. In Ethiopia, about 80% of the populace lives in rural zones and women are responsible for most of the agricultural work in these communities. Women are rarely perceived for their hard work, and most of the time a man figure in their lives confines their access to assets and network interest. One out of three women in Ethiopia have encountered sexual, physical, or mental viciousness, 65% of women have likewise experienced gender mutilation, and half of the young women who enroll into elementary schools never make it to grade five. Over the years women's shelters have begun operating in Ethiopia most prominently Association for Women's Sanctuary and Development which opened in 2003.

According to the director of the Ethiopian Women Lawyers Association Mahdere Paulos, "Empowering women begins with education". As young women get older, numerous things become less available, for example, education and scholastic support. Academic participation turns out to be progressively troublesome as it removes time from fundamental income creating activities. Undergraduate colleges in Ethiopia are composed of 35% women, and 5% are set to drop out during their first year. There are 11% of women educators in Universities making them disproportionately represented in the Ethiopian Academic System. A few different ways to better help women become compelling pioneers later on is to have a holistic educational program in their beginning phases of their education. For example, learning their reading skills early on, the association Reading for Ethiopia's Achievement Developed action centers around improving reading abilities in elementary schools.

=== Social norms relate to gender inequality ===
In the Ethiopian language there are certain feminized slurs and idiomatic expressions that contrast women with animals. Teferra expresses that this kind of language strengthens negative generalizations and depicts gender based violence on women as though it is admissible and on occasion important. Biased language use can influence uniformity for women, despite everything it places them on a lower proficient, social, and monetary level to men. To comprehend this issue and step forward, it will expect individuals to know about their language use and how it tends to be destructive and how it might influence a woman's prosperity.

Gendered Expectations can negatively affect women's sexual and reproduction wellbeing. Ewenat Gebrehana talks about how "the criminalization of child marriage and passage of a relatively lenient abortion law illustrates the progress made in designing legislative frameworks to improve women’s health." And tragically numerous Ethiopian families still practice arranged marriages at young ages. According to the Ethiopian Demographic And Health Survey 2016, the women's median for their first marriage is at 17 years of age and 15 years of age in the Amhara district, however it is 23 years of age for men. Society's desires for how a proper young women should behave and sociocultural standards about women sparing themselves until marriage.This signifies the many double standard guidelines related with sex and sexually transmitted diseases. Likewise, there are double standard norms related with women with socially sexually transmitted diseases not having the option to look for sexual and contraceptive wellbeing services. Health Care services are regularly not reasonable or open to ladies, this causes ladies with undesirable pregnancies or who furtively experience hazardous premature births to feel dread of judgment and the consequences of going astray from the standard.

=== Arranged marriages ===
Numerous women in Ethiopia are placed into arranged marriages when they're young. Fetura Mohammed, a 14-year-old in the Oromo region, had an organized marriage set by her dad, yet she just desired to "complete her education and have her own job before getting married." Many young women are uninformed of their rights in Ethiopia with regards to harmful traditional practices because of the absence of education women get. These harmful traditional practices can extend from child marriage, female genital mutilation and polygamous marriage. As indicated by specific tribes, for example, the Oromo tribe being married after the age of 16 is viewed as a taboo and carries disgrace to the young women and the family.

Komobolcha is the home of a Local Rights Programmers where ActionAid Ethiopia a grantee of the UN Trust Fund to End Violence against women, which is sharing knowledge among women to help anticipate child marriage/arranged marriages and other unsafe traditional practices. The program additionally gives data about lawful arrangements and enables women to get sorted out into watch groups. As women structure into watch groups they start to raise their voices and protest, spread open mindfulness, network with leaders, take legal actions, and form events for an after school clubs.

When ActionAid began in 2009 there was a total of 655 women who were prepared and sorted out into 78 watch groups in 10 regions in Ethiopia. The 17 women watch groups in Kombolcha have created that system and engaged with community leaders, school clubs and law requirement offices to dispose of child marriage, and breaking down religions and traditional beliefs that help support it. Through these courses of actions some men leaders who are traditional/old-fashioned that also use to rehearse these conventional convictions are currently taking a shot at abolishing it and playing a role in change.

=== Abortion ===
Binyam Bogale, Mekitie Wondafrash, Tizta Tilahun, and Eshetu Girma discuss how women in Ethiopia are always in a position where their opinions are voiced by someone else or not voiced at all in regards to the use of contraceptives. Usually these issues are either made or voiced by their partners, and can affect their reproductive lives more than their partners. By fixing this issue it can affect the relevance for planning contextually appropriate family planning interventions.

Modern family planning interventions in the area should be promoted by considering empowering of women on modern contraceptive use decision making. Mekitie Wondafrash, Tizta Tilahun, and Eshetu Girma come to a conclusion that to help empower women to make important decisions their needs to be a collective discussion addressing the issue to prevent pregnancy. According to Binyam Bogale, Mekitie Wondafrash, Tizta Tilahun, and Eshetu Girma, high level of current modern contraceptive practice with reduced urban-rural difference was found as compared to regional and national figures. Urban women had better power to make decisions on modern contraceptive than rural women."

== First female leaders in Ethiopia ==
=== First female president ===
On October 25, 2018, Sahle-Work Zewde was elected as Ethiopia's first female president. Before joining the Ministry of Foreign Affairs in 1988, she started her career in the Ministry of Education. She was accredited to Mali, Guinea, Guinea-Bissau, Cape Verde, and the Gambia prior to beginning her long diplomatic career as ambassador to Senegal. She spent ten years as the permanent representative to the Inter-Governmental Authority on Development (IGAD) as the ambassador in Djibouti. She was afterwards named Ethiopia's ambassador to France, Tunisia, and Morocco as well as the permanent representative to the UNESCO. Upon her return to Ethiopia, she was named director general for African affairs at the Ethiopian Ministry of Foreign Affairs as well as permanent representative to the African Union.

As the first African woman to hold the position of Special Representative of the United Nations Secretary-General (SRSG), Zewde joined the UN in 2009 and served as both the head of the UN Integrated Peace-building Office in the Central African Republic (BINUCA) and the SRSG.

=== First female supreme court president ===
Meaza Ashenafi was named president of Ethiopia's Federal Supreme Court by the Federal Parliamentary Assembly in November 2018 as the first female Supreme Court president in Ethiopia. Ashenafi worked as a women's rights advisor for the United Nations Economic Commission for Africa, headquartered in Ethiopian capital Addis Ababa.

=== First female mayor of Addis ===
Adanech Abiebie is the first female mayor of the capital city Addis Ababa.

== See also ==
- Polygamy in Ethiopia
- Human trafficking in Ethiopia
- Women in Africa
- Ethiopian feminists facing digital gender-based violence
