= Atsedeweine Tekle =

Ethiopian lawyer and jurist (born 1952)

- አፀደወይን ተክለ

Commissioner of drafting commission for the 1995 FDRE Constitution
- In office 1992–1994
- President: Meles Zenawi
- Prime Minister: Tamrat Layne

Personal details
- Born: 28 June 1952 (age 74) Asmara, Eritrea Province, Ethiopian Empire
- Citizenship: Ethiopian
- Education: Addis Ababa University (LLB)
- Occupation: Lawyer; Jurist; Women's rights activist

Atsedeweine Tekle Riggio (Amharic: አፀደወይን ተክለ ሪጎ) is an Ethiopian lawyer and jurist who was the country's first female judge, serving on both the High Court and the Supreme Court.

== Early life and education ==
Tekle was born in Asmara, Eritrea (then the Federation of Ethiopia and Eritrea) on 28 June 1952, one of six girls among seven children in the family. Due to their father's encouragement, all six girls completed university, which was highly unusual at the time. She graduated with an LLB from Addis Ababa University in 1978, one of the first female law graduates in Ethiopia, despite taking two years from her studies to fulfil the Derg government's national service requirement, "Zemecha".

== Career ==
Tekle was assigned to the Ministry of Justice supervising court administration. After three years, she was appointed as a High Court judge, then later as a presiding judge of the Supreme Court. She was the first female judge in the country. She resigned from the bench to practice law privately.

From 1992 to 1994, Tekle was one of three women members of the 1992-1994 Constitutional drafting commission for the 1995 Constitution of Ethiopia, and was responsible for the inclusion of strong language supporting the rights of women and overturning gender discrimination.

In 1995, she co-founded the Ethiopian Women Lawyers Association with Meaza Ashenafi and Maria Yusuf. She represents underprivileged women pro bono and has written and translated publications on women's rights and human rights.

== Publications ==
- Tekle, Atsedeweine (1978). Comparative analysis of the principles of marriage laws of Ethiopia to that of the people's Republic of China (Thesis). Addas Ababa University.

== Personal life ==
Tekle married shortly after completing her law degree and has four children.
