= State courts of Ethiopia =

In Ethiopia, there are three types of state courts: the State Supreme Court, State High Court, and State First-Instance Court. The FDRE Constitution guarantees the delegation of the state courts to the federal courts (the Federal First Instance, High and Supreme Courts).

The seats of the State Supreme Court are found in capital cities of the regions of Ethiopia, while the High Court found in zonal branches and the First Instance Court in woreda branches.

== Provision ==
Ethiopia has three level of state courts: the State Supreme Court, State High Court, and State First Instance Court. The highest authority, the State Supreme Court, incorporates cession bench to ensure fundamental errors of law in the state. The seats of the State Supreme Court are located in their respective capital cities; the High Court seats are found in zonal branches while the First Instance Court seats found in woreda level.

The Constitution guarantees the judicial delegation of State Supreme Courts and State High Courts to the Federal Supreme Court and Federal High Court. In this case, appellate rights of the State First Instance Court and State High Court cases and decisions are rendered to State Supreme Court, as the State Supreme Court cases appealed to the Federal Supreme Court in federal matter.

== List of regions with state courts ==
Regions	Seats location	Notes	Ref.
Addis Ababa	Addis Ababa	Federal chartered city	
Afar	Asaita		
Amhara	Bahir Dar		
Benishangul-Gumuz	Asosa		
Central Ethiopia Regional State	Butajira		
Dire Dawa	Dire Dawa	Federal chartered city	
Gambela	Gambela		
Harari	Harar		
Oromia	Addis Ababa		
Sidama	Hawassa		
Somali	Jijiga		
South Ethiopia	Sodo		
South West Ethiopia	Bonga		
Tigray	Mekelle		

== See also ==
- Courts of Ethiopia
