= Tronvoll =

Tronvoll is a surname. Notable people with the surname include:

- Kjetil Tronvoll (born 1966), Norwegian professor at the Norwegian Centre for Human Rights
- Mette Tronvoll (born 1965), Norwegian photo artist
- Olav Tronvoll (born 1986), Norwegian ski mountaineer
- Ove-Erik Tronvoll (born 1972), Norwegian ski mountaineer and cross-country skier
