= Customary law in Ethiopia =

Traditional unofficial laws in Ethiopia

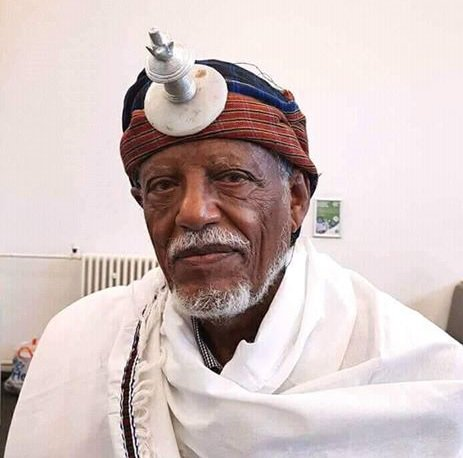
Professor Asmerom Legesse in Abbaa Gadaa cloth.

Customary laws, in line with official state laws, are based on age-old community customs and norms in Ethiopia. They are noticeable in regional states and become influential in the life of people more than the formal legal system. For example, in Amhara Region, they are called "Shemagelle", in Tigray "Bayito" and "Abo Gereb", and "Luba Basa" in Oromia.

== Oromo people ==
In Oromo culture, the gadaa system is portrayed as egalitarian system of governance in which every eight years one generation set (Luuba), consisting of a segment of one-fifth of the men of the same generation. It is therefore centerpiece for Borana society welfare through prayer and sacrifice. The Gadaa system has series of disciplinary rules where Gadaa officials are appointed in every eight years to act as arbitrators, lawmakers and ritual leaders.

It is "key word" and "social ideology" of Oromo society. There is controversy about the system that it follows political institutions rather than primarily a cultural and spiritual one. However, there is agreement that it plays a fundamental role of integrating clans, promoting peace, and mediating between human and divine worlds. The gumi gaayo (meeting of the multitude) held in every eight years and provides promulgations, adaptation or repealing the seera law and aadaa customs.

Clansmen are expected to settle issues friendly at meetings, and household headset involve arbitrate their views, with speaking experience are respected. Decisions are made after consensus, and references constantly made of the body of customary law called Aadaa Borena. Decisions and fines are made by councils or assemblies. If parties decision failed to reach consensus, it then passed to a clan assembly named Kora Gossa. If matter are still no resolve there, it would transfer to highest level.

The ultimate assembly is all Boran ("Gumi Gaayo"), which is held in every eight years at Gayu. However most matters in this level are generally resolved by councils based on locality (kora, olaa, kora deeda) or kinship (kora gossa). Inter-clan matters are resolved by the gadaa and qallu councils (yaa'a, gadaa, yaa'a qallu). The council rely on largely persuasion and the rhetorical threat of sanctions including fines and corporal punishments, which is not often implemented. The final sanction would be Nagaa Boran ("the peace of the Boran"), in which the person quarantined and bless, and not interact with social and ritual support. This might be "cursed" (abarsa).

== Amhara people ==
Customary laws in Amhara society is generally written orally, while some laws embodies in codified law of Ethiopia. For instance, the institution of family arbitration, equal sharing of property in inheritance by female descendants etc.

=== Abat ===
Local administration and judicial functions are both discharged by institution that is known as abat. Abat used when justice was found to be insufficient for community and the government inability to counter crime and insecurity prevailed in the region. It consists of a combination of respected elders elected to office at the general meeting of community.

Depending on the area and population, the community elect seven abats acting as lawmakers, arbitrary and executive powers. In general, abats are entrusted and useful tool for maintenance of laws, both criminal and civil laws based on customary tradition.

=== Yegobez Aleqa ===
The community decide to elect Yegobez Aleqa for maintenance of revolt because of the burden imposed by the government found incapable. Yegobez Aleqa empowered to lead elders in the community, and maintains peace and order, reinstitute property to those dispossessed or forcibly grabbed by special power.

=== Chiqa Shum ===
Chiqa Shum is another established administrative institution in the Amhara community that presides the locality. Chiqa Shum also empowered to adjudicate cases involving battering, divorce, trespass and other minor cases. Furthermore, chiqa shum also responsible to communicate with the government and collecting taxes. The office of chiqa shum is hereditary title in Wello, while it has privilege rotating in every year among all rest holders in the Gojjam and Gondar region, and in northern Shewa.

=== Yezemed Dagna ===
Yezemed Dagna is another important institution in the Amhara community, acting as a family arbitrator. The family arbitrator is useful for settling issues by bringing opposing parties together for mediation before they are heard by regular courts that probably lack cautious measures and potentially damage relationships.

The Amhara community regarded Yezemed Dagna as first instance courts.

== Somali people ==
Somalis in Ethiopia are herding people, keeping cattle, camel, and small livestock, as well as predominant traders in eastern Ethiopia. The Somalis have a clan-based political and social system, although clans do not necessarily represent permanent and homogeneous unit. Clans are organized into higher level units, usually called (by outsiders) clan families.

Somali society is patrilineal; most social relations are based on kinship links.

=== Ugaz ===
Each clan has famed and authoritative leader who is known in various regions as ugaz, garad or bagar. The reference to the clan leader does not mean that the Somali people have a single administrative authority, nor does each class have its own ugaz.

Some clans have ugaz who have the same functions and status, while others do not have anything.

=== Lineage leader ===
Lineage leader is classed in the next level. The word "lineage" refers to relations of its members and every person knows to which lineage the person belongs. The lineage leader governs the affairs of his lineage and represents them in administrative organs.

=== Dia-paying group leader ===
The dia-paying group consists of person with at most, in fourth and fifth generation. Therefore, the person in this position is liable to compensation such as blood money and able to discharge people obligation. Despite lacking a formal leader, it enforces law and order through its elders. As a result, the bond of blood relations can be constitute as dia-paying groups under political and territorial units.

=== Assembly of the people ===
The assembly of the people is the highest lawmaking organ. The basic principle in Somali society is "Life is redressed by life". The primary duty of the institution is to track down the offender who committed a crime and impose retributive action against the person or a close relative. If the crime is committed among the warring lineages, the issue is considered a family problem and passed to a higher level. This is called an inter-clan feud.

== Tigray people ==
The Tigrayan society has laws similar to those of the Amharas, based on oral tradition. According to Irob and other districts of Tigray Region, compensation is not made for crimes of other types.

== See also ==
- Courts of Ethiopia
