= Woldeyes =

Woldeyes is a surname. Notable people with the surname include:

- Asrat Woldeyes (1928–1999), Ethiopian surgeon
- Billene Seyoum Woldeyes (born 1982), Ethiopian politician
