= Maria Yusuf =

Ethiopian judge, women's rights activist

Maria Munir Yusuf
- Born: Addis Ababa, Ethiopia
- Education: Unity University (LLB)
- Occupation: Activist

Maria Munir Yusuf is founder and director of the Association for Women's Sanctuary and Development in Ethiopia. She also co-founded the Ethiopian Women Lawyers Association.

== Early life ==
Maria was born in Addis Ababa, Ethiopia to Harari parents. She became involved in charitable work while still in high school, and was able to raise relief funds for the Wollo famine in collaboration with the YWCA.

== Career ==
Maria began her career as a judge at the High Court of Ethiopia and following becoming a lawyer co-founded Ethiopian Women Lawyers Association (EWLA) in 1995 serving as board member with other Ethiopian women including Meaza Ashenafi and Atsedeweine Tekle.

In 2003 Maria founded the "Organization against Gender Based Violence" in Ethiopia which would later be renamed the Association for Women's Sanctuary and Development (AWSAD) in 2009, the organization was the first to provide shelter exclusively for vulnerable women in the country. In 2011 she met with Michelle Bachelet director of UN Women who paid a visit to AWSAD.

== Awards & accolades ==
Maria was presented with the AWiB's Women of Excellence award in 2015.
