= Kjetil Tronvoll =

Norwegian anthropologist (born 1966)

- Born: 2 March 1966
- Education: University of Oslo, London School of Economics
- Occupations: Professor, anthropologist
- Employer: Oslo New University College

Kjetil Tronvoll is a peace and conflict studies researcher, specialising in Eritrea, Ethiopia and Zanzibar. As of 2021, he is a professor of peace and conflict studies at Bjørknes University College and heads a consultancy firm Oslo Analytica.

== Childhood and education ==
Tronvoll was born on 2 March 1966 (age 60) He graduated with a master's degree at the University of Oslo and a PhD in political anthropology at the London School of Economics.

== Peace and human rights research ==
Tronvoll carried out anthropological studies in Eritrea, Ethiopia and Zanzibar, and has been involved in human rights, peace processes and research in Eritrea, Ethiopia and other African countries. He was the first non-Eritrean researcher to enter Eritrea in August 1991 after the Eritrean War of Independence in which the Eritrean People's Liberation Front (EPLF) and the Ethiopian People's Revolutionary Democratic Front (EPRDF) overthrew the Derg. He stayed in a highland village studying the relation between the villagers and the EPLF. Tronvoll was an observer in the 1993 Eritrean independence referendum.

In a 2009 report on human rights in Eritrea commissioned by the Oslo Center, Tronvoll stated that while drafts of Eritrean law codes prepared in 1997 were consistent with international principles of law, the new law codes had no real effect. He said that civil society organisations and independent newspapers briefly existed in Eritrea in 2001 following the 1998–2000 Eritrean–Ethiopian War, but were crushed from September to December 2001. He estimated the number of political prisoners in the range 10,000–30,000 and said that there was widespread and systematic torture and extrajudicial killings, with "anyone" for "any or no reason", including children eight years old, people over 80 years old and ill people, being liable to be arrested. Tronvoll summarised the situation stated that in 2009, Eritrea had "developed into one of the world's most totalitarian and human rights-abusing regimes".

Tronvoll has expertise in the law of Ethiopia.

Tronvoll was a professor of human rights at the University of Oslo until 2010. As of 2021, Tronvoll held the position of professor of peace and conflict studies at Bjørknes University College. He was also director of a consultancy firm Oslo Analytica.

== Harassment ==
During the Tigray War that started in November 2020, Tronvoll was the subject of a hate speech campaign, including death threats, that he said appeared to be based on misinformation spread by Ethiopian government agences, including the Information Network Security Agency (INSA). Tronvoll initially contacted Norwegian police to ask for a risk assessment, but was told that it was beyond the police's mandate. He requested the Ministry of Foreign Affairs to intervene. A Joint Council of Africa meeting in Norway planned for early February 2021 was cancelled as a result of the death threats, to avoid risks to the participants. The Stockholm Ethiopian Embassy claimed to be unaware of the death threats and of INSA accusations. The embassy stated that Tronvoll's analysis of the Tigray War and its context consisted of "unfounded criticism and baseless serious accusations against the Ethiopian government".
