= SoleRebels =

Ethiopian footwear manufacturer

SoleRebels is an International footwear company based in Addis Ababa, Ethiopia. The company was created by Ethiopian entrepreneur Bethlehem Tilahun Alemu in 2005. The business is recognized for its ethical production, including Fair Trade practices and the use of sustainable materials in its manufacturing, particularly its use of recycled tires for the soles of its shoes.

== History ==
Alemu started the company with a bank loan of 580,000 Ethiopian Birr ($33,000). Her shoes are all spun on eucalyptus looms with hand-cut and stitched soles with recycled materials.

She named the company as a nod to Ethiopian rebel soldiers who wore handcrafted rubber tire sandals.

As of 2016, the shoes were sold in more than 50 countries.

Called the "Fastest Growing African Shoe Brand" in 2014, the business sells its products directly to customers via its website and in retail outlets in North America, Europe, and Asia.

== Locations ==
In October 2014, soleRebels opened its first retail store in San Jose, California. As of 2016, they had retail outlets in Addis Ababa, the United States, Taiwan, Japan, Greece, Switzerland, Spain, Austria and Singapore. In August 2018, soleRebels opened its first retail store in Hamburg, Germany.

== Controversies ==
From 2021 to 2022, there have been numerous complaints against SoleRebels, citing undelivered orders and customers waiting over a year in some cases for their orders to be delivered. Others have stated, according to the SoleRebels Facebook page, that their emails and messages go without response. SoleRebels did not respond to accusations of theft regarding this issue and returned the attempt to begin a report by the Better Business Bureau.
