= Law of Ethiopia =

Since the new constitution of Ethiopia enacted in 1995, Ethiopia's legal system consisted of federal law with bicameral legislature. The House of Peoples' Representatives (HoPR) is the lower chamber of bicameral legislature of Federal Parliamentary Assembly with 547 seats and the House of Federation with 108 seats, the former vested on executive power of Prime Minister and the Council of Ministers, and the latter have authority to interpret federal law and oversees regional and federal decisions.

Emblem of Federal Democratic Republic of Ethiopia, since 1995

The Prime Minister, elected by members of HoPR, is an executive power whereas the president serves ceremonial power, only can approve new laws in HoPR. The judicial body of Ethiopia is independent with two structures: the federal and state courts, and the Federal Supreme Court is cassation division division that can overturn and review the lower courts of both federal and state level. The Ministry of Justice mandates the law enforcement under Article 23 Proclamation 471/2005, overseeing the Federal Police Commission.

== Federal legislature ==
The Constitution of Federal Democratic Republic of Ethiopia establishes two house parliament for the federal government; the lower chamber of bicameral legislature is House of Peoples' Representatives (HoPR) with 547 seats, and the upper chamber, the House of Federation (HoPR), has 108 seats. The highest legislative authority vested in the HPR— in comparable to first or lower chamber— served an interest of the federation as whole. The members of HoPR are elected in plural vote in every five years elections. HoPR retained 20 seats for minority group in order to secure their representation. However, they are seen as insignificant than others in the FDRE constitution, only declared them shall be determined by law.

Ethiopia follows parliamentary system wherein the largest political parties representing in HoPR can preside/approve over members of executive Council of Prime Minister and the Prime Minister. In addition, the HoPR also have authority to nominate or candidate the president, who would be accepted by two-third majority of both chambers. The President has minimal or limited power in executive legislature, but can sign new laws from HoPR, whereas the Prime Minister is executive power, similar to presidential systems.

Members of HoPR popularly elected for five-year term known as "first-past-the post" electoral system. The HPR roles are to enact laws on the matters assigned by federal jurisdiction and ratify national policy standard. Another roles including an appointment of federal judges, the ratification of international agreements, and supervision of members of the executive. The upper chamber, the House of Federation, serves representational institution for regional units of "Nations, Nationalities and People's". Each ethnolinguistic groups should have one representative in HOF, and necessarily, the representative would be fractured into extra for each population if population number given to consideration. Members of HOF are elected by state council in each regional state. The HOF vested power to interpret the federal constitution, and rights to decide self-determination of groups ultimately, secession, resolution happened between states, and determines the joint revenue of federal and state units.

== Federal executive ==
=== Prime minister ===
The Prime Minister and Council of Ministers are the highest executive power accountable to HoPR which is elected by members of HoPR, and not subject to term limit. The Prime Minister has the following functions:

- The Prime Minister is the Chief Executive, the Chairman of the Council of Ministers, and the Commander-in-Chief of the national armed forces.
- shall submit for approval to the House of Peoples’ Representatives nominees for ministerial posts from among members of the two Houses or from among persons who are not members of either House and possess the required qualifications.
- shall follow up and ensure the implementation of laws, policies, directives and other decisions adopted by the House of Peoples' Representatives.
- leads the Council of Ministers, coordinates its activities and acts as its representative.
- exercises overall supervision over the implementation of policies, regulations, directives and decisions adopted by the Council of Ministers.
- exercises overall supervision over the implementation of the country's foreign policy.
- selects and submits for approval to the House of Peoples’ Representatives nominations for posts of Commissioners, the President and vice-president of the Federal Supreme Court and the Auditor General.
- supervises the conduct and efficiency of the Federal administration and takes such corrective measures as are necessary.
- appoints high civilian officials of the Federal Government other than those referred to in sub-Articles 2 and 3 of this Article.
- In accordance with law enacted or decision adopted by the House of Peoples’ Representatives, he/she recommends to the President nominees for the award of medals, prizes and gifts.
- shall submit to the House of Peoples’ Representatives periodic reports on work accomplished by the Executive as well as on its plans and proposals.
- shall discharge all responsibilities entrusted to him/her by this Constitution and other laws.
- shall obey and enforce the Constitution.

=== Council of Ministers ===
The Council of Ministers has equivalent authority as Prime Minister, comprising The Prime Minister and its subordinates, the Deputy Prime Minister and Ministers that could be determined by law. The Council of Ministers has the following functions:

- The Council of Ministers ensures the implementation of laws and decisions adopted by the House of Peoples’ Representatives.
- shall decide on the organizational structure of ministries and other organs of government responsible to it; it shall coordinate their activities and provide leadership.
- shall draw up the annual Federal budget and, when approved by the House of Peoples’ Representatives, it shall implement it.
- shall ensure the proper execution of financial and monetary policies of the country; it shall administer the National Bank, decide on the printing of money and minting of coins, borrow money from domestic and external sources, and regulate foreign exchange matters.
- shall protect patents and copyrights.
- shall formulate and implement economic, social and development policies and strategies.
- shall provide uniform standards of measurement and calendar.
- shall formulate the country's foreign policy and exercise overall supervision over its implementation.
- shall ensure the observance of law and order.
- has the power to declare a state of emergency; in doing so, it shall submit, within the time limit prescribed by the Constitution, the proclamation declaring a state of emergency for approval by the House of Peoples’ Representatives.
- shall submit draft laws to the House of Peoples’ Representatives on any matter falling within its competence, including draft laws on a declaration of war.
- shall carry out other responsibilities that may be entrusted to it by the House of Peoples’ Representatives and the Prime Minister.
- shall enact regulations pursuant to powers vested in it by the House of Peoples' Representatives.

=== State institutions ===
The Federal Democratic Republic of Ethiopia consisted of eleven regional states and two chartered cities such as Addis Ababa and Dire Dawa. These regional states have legislative, executive and judicial power over state jurisdiction. With legislative scope, these state have the right to enact and execute state constitutions, which have authority over legislative, executive and judicial branch of state administration.

==== State legislature ====
All member states in the federation comprised a legislative organ called State Council. The State Council has authority over legislation under state jurisdiction, including drafting, and amending state constitution, and provide its members and their modalities in their election. Many states have unicameral house and parliamentary council functioned to enact and decide laws in the constitution, in spite of two second legislative bodies could determine the constitutional issues similar to House of Federation. As constitutional parliamentary body, they are called House of Nationalities.

==== State executive ====
It is the highest executive organ within the state administration. The state's administration has Chief Administrator, or Regional Administrator as its chief executive officer, and is elected by members of the political coalition of State Council which are a majority. The power vested to form state executive council and nominate member as the Chief Administrator, Deputy Administrator and other heads of various regional bureaus obligated to be confirmed by State Council. In general, the state executive council has the right to enact laws and policies enacted by the State Council or federal legislature, and its structure could be extended through third-level administrative units, such as Zones and woredas.

=== Judicial body ===
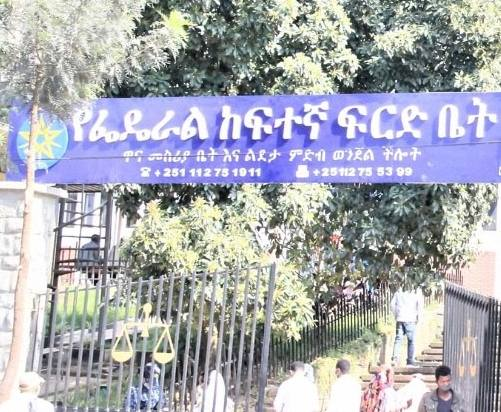
The Federal Supreme Court has judicial authority over lower courts of state and federal levels

The judiciary is totally independent with two court structures: the federal court and the state court, which have both vested in courts. The Constitution guarantees HoPR oversight of the federal judicial authority in Federal Supreme Court, if necessary, they would subordinate federal courts. There are Federal Supreme Court in Addis Ababa and developed recently; the Federal High Court and First Instance Courts are existing in the two chartered city, Addis Ababa and Dire Dawa. The Federal High Courts have established five states, which have ability to integrate within the state or "area designated for its jurisdiction" or if deemed "necessary for efficient rendering of justice".

Each court has civil, criminal and labor division that contain presiding judges along two other judges for each division. The Federal High Court is cassation division that completely have overturn or review decision by lower federal court or State Supreme Court containing fundamental errors of law. In addition, the judicial decision in cassation division of the Federal High Court during interpreting law associated the Federal and state courts. The Constitution stipulates the federal court control over constitutional or national jurisdiction, i.e. international matters; for example, the Article 3(3) state that the Federal Court Proclamation have judicial power on FDRE constitution or in federal law. Similar stipulation in Article 5 states the involvement of civil jurisdiction over federal government organ is party, their duties and official responsibilities. Article 4 also guarantees similar acts wherein the Federal Courts Proclamation affects in every aspects of national interests, including in economy or foreign relations.

== Accountability and administration ==
The FDRE Constitution guarantees the President and vice-president appointed by HoPR with recommendation of Prime Minister and other federal judges appointed by HOF, from list of candidates by the Federal Judicial Administration Commission (FJAC). The federal court prohibits any removal of judges until their retirement and violation of disciplinary rules, gross incompetence, or inefficiency, or illness that prevents the judge out of responsibility. The FJAC also authorized these disciplinary rules, appointment and promotion or condition of employment.

The FJAC consists of nine federal judges and three members of HoPR, composed by their sorts:

- The President of the Federal Supreme Court, Chairman
- The vice-president of the Federal Supreme Court
- Three members of the House of Peoples' Representatives
- The most senior judge of the Federal Supreme Court
- The President of the Federal High Court
- The most senior judge of the Federal High Court
- The President of the Federal First Instance Court

The FJAC also has the following powers and duties:

- To select those who qualify for judgeship in accordance with Article 8 of this Proclamation from among candidates nominated by members of the Commission
- To forward its opinion on the list of Regional Supreme and High Court candidate- Judges, submitted to it by a Regional Judicial Administration Commission pursuant to Article 81 (4) of the Constitution
- To issue the Disciplinary and Code of Conduct Rules for federal judges
- To decide on the transfer, salary, allowance, promotion, medical benefits and placement of federal judges
- To examine and decide in accordance with Article 79 (4) of the Constitution, matters presented to it pursuant to article 9 herein. It may suspend a judge until the decision is approved by the House of Peoples' Representatives, subject to details to be determined in the Disciplinary and Code of Conduct Rules.

=== State Courts ===
The Addis Ababa Charter established kebele (currently there are 200 kebeles). Social Courts used to hearing monetary and property claims by 5,000 ETB. These Courts decisions can be appealed through First-Instance City Courts.

=== Municipal Courts ===
The First Instance and Appellate Court is the cassation division in municipal jurisdiction of Addis Ababa. If needed, the Appellate Court decision brought to Federal Supreme Court, who terminate jurisdictional conflicts between federal or municipal levels. The Addis Ababa City Court have civil, criminal and petty offense jurisdiction, whereas the Oromia Region Government similarly implemented municipal court consisting 10,000 people.

== Law enforcement ==
=== Ministry of Justice ===
The Ministry of Justice has the largest executive power fallen under federal courts. The Article 23 Proclamation 471/2005 detailed about the power of Ministry of Justice:

- Is chief advisor to the Federal Government on matters of law;
- Represents the Federal Government in criminal cases falling under the jurisdiction of the Federal Courts;
- Orders the conduct of investigation where it believes that a crime the adjudication of which falls under the jurisdiction of the federal courts has been committed; orders the discontinuance of an investigation or instructs further investigation on good cause; withdraw criminal charges in accordance with the law;
- Studies the causes of and the methods of crime prevention; devise ways and means of crime prevention; coordinate the relevant government organs in crime prevention;
- Ensure that witnesses to a criminal case are accorded protection, as necessary;
- Assists victims of crimes or violations of human rights in civil proceedings to claim damages where such victims are unable to institute such claims in federal courts and to follow up the proceeding on their own;
- Institutes or cause the institution of suits or intervene at any stage of the proceedings of such suits before federal and regional state courts, any judicial body or arbitration tribunal where the rights and interests of the public and of the Federal Government so require
- Registers religious organizations, nonprofit making foreign organizations and, unless specific power is given to other government organs, non-governmental organizations and associations operating in the cities of Addis Ababa and Dire Dawa or in more than one Regional State
- Follows up, as necessary, the handling of civil suits and claims to which the federal government organs are parties; cause reports to be submitted to it on same, and ensure that competent staff is assigned for the purpose
- Assists in the preparation of draft laws when, so requested by federal and regional state organs
- Issues, supervises and revokes licenses advocates for practicing before federal courts
- Provides legal education through the use of various methods with a view to raising public legal consciousness in relation to the protection of human rights; cooperate with the appropriate bodies regarding legal education and training;
- Undertakes legal reform studies and carry out the codification and consolidation of federal laws; collect regional State laws and consolidate.

=== Federal Police Commission ===
The Federal Police Commission was established in 1995 under Proclamation No.313/2013, which is accountable for Ministry of Federal Affairs. The Federal Police Commission has the following duties and functions:

- Prevent and investigate crimes that fall under the jurisdiction of Federal Courts
- Prevent any activities in violation of the Constitution that may endanger the Constitutional order
- Prevent violence against public peace, hooliganism, terrorism, trafficking in and transferring of drugs
- Prevent crimes against the interests and institutions of the Federal Government
- Without prejudice to Sub-Article (2) of this Article, maintain law and order in any region in accordance with the order of the Federal Government when there is a deteriorating security situation beyond the control of the concerned region and a request for intervention is made by the region: or when disputes arise between two or more regions and the situation becomes dangerous for the Federal security
- Safeguard the security of borders, airports, railway lines and terminals, mining areas, and other vital institutions of the Federal Government
- Give security protection to higher officials of the Federal Government and dignitaries of foreign countries
- Execute orders and decisions of courts
- Execute orders issued by the Federal Public Prosecutor in regard to investigation of crimes
- Issue a certificate of no criminal record

=== Federal Prison Commission ===
The Federal Prison Commission also coded in Proclamation No. 365/2003 accountable to the Ministry of Federal Affairs. They have a role of disciplinary actions toward prisoners, providing rehabilitation to ease the prisoner's behavior and conduct. It has a power to most prison facilities.
