= Solomon Areda =

Ethiopian lawyer

Solomon Areda Waktolla
- ሰለሞን አረዳ ዋቅቶላ
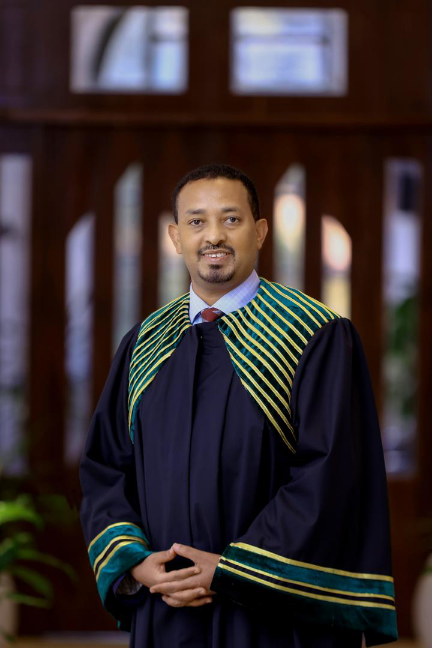

Judge of the United Nations Dispute Tribunal
- Incumbent
- Assumed office 1 July 2023

Vice-President of the Federal Supreme Court
- In office 1 November 2018 – 17 January 2023
- President: Sahle-Work Zewde
- Prime Minister: Abiy Ahmed
- Preceded by: Tsegaye Asemamaw
- Succeeded by: Abeba Embiale

Personal details
- Born: Garba Guracha, Salale, Ethiopia
- Spouse: Mulualem Girma
- Children: 4
- Education: Harvard Law School (LLM); Harvard Kennedy School of Government (MPA); Amsterdam University (LLM); Addis Ababa University (LLB)

Solomon Areda Waktolla (Amharic: ሰለሞን አረዳ ዋቅቶላ, Oromo: Solomoon Araddaa Waqtolaa) is a Harvard-trained international judge who previously served as the Deputy Chief Justice of Ethiopia from 2018 to 2023. Solomon is a prominent lawyer with 29 years of experience in the practice of law, public administration and policy research who is committed for seeing a free and independent judiciary in Ethiopia. Solomon had worked in the judiciary mainly as a judge for 20 years on different levels of the court in both regional and federal positions. In addition, he has been appointed to the membership of the Permanent Court of Arbitration (PCA) at The Hague, Netherlands for a six-year term to serve as an Arbitrator.

Solomon was appointed on 15 November 2022 by the UN General Assembly as a Half-time Judge of the United Nations Dispute Tribunal for a mandate starting on 1 July 2023 and ending on 30 June 2030. Furthermore, he has been appointed by the Board of Directors of the African Development Bank as a Judge of the Administrative Tribunal of the African Development Bank, effective from November 2023.

== Early life and education ==
Solomon Areda Waktolla born in the town of Garba Guracha, Salalee, North Shewa zone of Oromia regional state in Ethiopia.

He attended his elementary and high school education in a public school in the town of Garba Guracha. He then attended Addis Ababa University and obtained a bachelor's degree in law in 1997. He received a Master of Laws degree (LL.M) from Harvard Law School and Master of public Administration (MPA) from Harvard Kennedy School of Government. He obtained HIID Merit Scholarship award from Harvard University. At Harvard Kennedy School of Government, Solomon completed the fellowship of Edward S. Mason Program in public policy and management. In addition, he received Master of Laws (LL.M) in International Economic Law at the University of Amsterdam.

He is a member of the Harvard Alumni Association and currently serving as Harvard University Contact Person in Ethiopia. Solomon is a fellow of Golda Meir Mount Carmel International Training Center and an alumnus of the Center for American and International Law.

== Judicial career ==
After graduating from law school, Solomon began working as an assistant judge in the Oromia Region Supreme Court. After his clerkship, Solomon was appointed as a judge of the Regional High Court in West Shewa Zone of Oromia region in Ambo Town. During his years in the Ambo High Court, he served in both Civil and Criminal divisions of the court. In 2001, Solomon started his judgeship at the Federal First Instance Court of Ethiopia. From February 2003 to January 2009, Solomon served as a Federal High Court Judge and sat in Commercial, Criminal and Labor Divisions of the Federal High Court.

During his six-years tenure at the Federal High Court, Justice Solomon presided over the historical Ethiopian Red Terror genocide trial where the former Ministers and other Higher Officials that served during the Derg regime were prosecuted for genocide and crimes against humanity.

In January 2009, the Ethiopian House of Parliament appointed Solomon to serve as the Vice President of the Federal First Instance Court of Ethiopia.

== Private legal practice ==
After graduating from Harvard law School, in December 2014 Solomon started the private legal practice, establishing his own firm in Addis Ababa. Solomon Areda Law office offered a diversified expertise on various areas of the law; ranging from dealing in complex litigation and arbitration, corporate and commercial transactions, banking and finance, labor and employment, intellectual property, energy and infrastructure, mining and natural resources, construction law and Tax law. He advised both local, as well as global multi-nationals seeking to do business in Ethiopia and other African Countries

== Membership of the Permanent Court of Arbitration (PCA) ==
Solomon was appointed to the membership of the Permanent Court of Arbitration (PCA) for a term of six years as of December 2017 to serve as an arbitrator.

== Policy research ==
The Ethiopian Government in collaboration with UNDP hired an international consultant, Center for International Legal Cooperation (CILC), to conduct a study in order to identify the shortcomings of the Ethiopian legal system. In this study, Justice Waktolla worked with the group of International Experts and produced a Comprehensive Justice Sector Reform Program Base Line Study Report. The Ethiopian legal reform was initiated based on this study.

Solomon engaged in coordinating various projects with NGOs and Government offices geared towards promoting child justice through child friendly courts. He presented a research paper on 'the creation of child friendly courts in Ethiopia' on the UN Conference on the Convention of the Rights of the Child held in Geneva November 2009.

At Harvard Law School Solomon Waktolla, as a required written work, authored legal policy research on Land governance regime of Ethiopia. The research focuses on how to redesign the land governance system of Ethiopia by examining a wide range of other countries' collaborative arrangements between large-scale investors and local small-scale farmers and finally proposes what alternative inclusive business models and policy frameworks to be adapted in Ethiopia's context to address the current challenges.

== Appointment to the position of Deputy Chief Justice ==
On 1 November 2018, Prime Minister Abiy Ahmed announced the nomination of Meaza Ashenafi and Solomon Areda Waktolla to the Chief justice and Deputy Chief Justice position of the Federal Supreme Court of Ethiopia respectively in the Ethiopian Parliament. The House of People's Representatives (HPR) approved their appointment by unanimous vote. Some of the parliamentarians who spoke during the nomination have also praised the Prime Minister Abiy Ahmed for his picks based on meritocracy. Deputy Chief Justice Solomon Waktolla, serving alongside newly appointed Chief Justice Meaza Ashenafi, was engaged with reforming and modernizing the Ethiopian Judiciary since coming into office. He had also presided over one of the cassation benches of the Federal Supreme court. Furthermore, he served as a Deputy chair of the Council of the Constitutional Inquiry of Ethiopia.

On 17 January 2023, Meaza Ashenafi and Solomon Areda Waktolla resigned from their post. A letter of HoPR did not mention the reason behind their resignations.

== Appointment to the UN Dispute Tribunal ==
Solomon Areda Waktolla was appointed as a half time Judge of the United Nations Dispute Tribunal for the term 2023–2030 by the UN General Assembly in its 34th plenary meeting 77th session held on the 15th of November 2022 in New York. Solomon Waktolla won over Joanne Harrison, associate justice of supreme court in Australia, scoring the highest vote of 97 out of 190 member states of UN General Assembly meeting.

On June 15, 2023, Justice Solomon Waktolla was sworn into office by UN Secretary-General António Guterres at the United Nations headquarters in New York.

== Appointment to the Administrative Tribunal of the African Development Bank ==
Solomon Waktolla has been appointed by the Board of Directors of the African Development Bank as a Judge of the Administrative Tribunal of the African Development Bank, effective from November 2023.

== Personal life ==
Solomon is married to his wife Mulualem Girma Tadesse. They have two daughters and two sons.
