= Unity University =

Private university in Ethiopia

- ዩኒቲ ዩኒቨርስቲ
- Former names: Unity Language School Unity Law, Language, and Vocational Institute Unity College Unity University College
- Motto: Quality House
- Type: Private
- Established: 1991; 35 years ago
- Chairman: Mohammed Hussein Al Amoudi
- President: Dr. Arega Yirdaw
- Founder: Fisseha Eshetu
- Location: Addis Ababa, Ethiopia; 9°0′12.29″N 38°48′11.51″E
- Campus: Gerji, Addis Ababa, Ethiopia; CMC, Addis Ababa, Ethiopia; Keranio, Addis Ababa, Ethiopia; Adama, Ethiopia; Dessie, Ethiopia
- Language: English
- Nickname: Unity
- Website: www.uu.edu.et

Unity University (Amharic: ዩኒቲ ዩኒቨርስቲ) is a private university in Ethiopia established in 1991. It was founded by Fisseha Eshetu and Mohammed Hussein Al Amoudi has been the chairman of the university.

Headquartered in Gerji area, Addis Ababa, it has expanded its campuses into Adama and Dessie, becoming the first privately owned college in Ethiopia.

== History ==
Established in 1991, Unity language school. In March 1998 the institute was upgraded to a college level, following its achievements in education, becoming the first privately owned college in Ethiopia.

== Notable alumni ==
- Bethlehem Tilahun Alemu, businesswoman, class of 2004
- Maria Yusuf, activist

== See also ==
- Education in Ethiopia
- List of universities and colleges in Ethiopia
