= Tewodros Mihret =

Ethiopian lawyer

- ቴዎድሮስ ምህረት

President of the Federal Supreme Court of Ethiopia
- Incumbent
- Assumed office 17 January 2023
- President: Sahle-Work Zewde; Taye Atske Selassie
- Prime Minister: Abiy Ahmed
- Vice President: Abeba Embiale
- Preceded by: Meaza Ashenafi

Personal details
- Party: Prosperity Party
- Education: Addis Ababa University (PhD)
- Occupation: Lawyer; Legal advisor; academic

Tewodros Mihret (Amharic: ቴዎድሮስ ምህረት) is an Ethiopian lawyer and academic who is serving as the President of the Federal Supreme Court of Ethiopia since 17 January 2023, succeeding Meaza Ashenafi.

== Career ==
Tewodros was an assistant professor at the Legal Service Department of Addis Ababa University. In the 6th regular session of the House of Peoples' Representatives (HoPR) on 17 January 2023, Tewodros has been appointed as the President of the Federal Supreme Court of Ethiopia while Abeba Embiale appointed as the Vice President of the Federal Supreme Court.
