= Abeba Embiale =

Ethiopian judge

- አበባ እምብያለ

Vice President of the Federal Supreme Court of Ethiopia
- Incumbent
- Assumed office 17 January 2023
- President: Tewodros Mihret
- Prime Minister: Abiy Ahmed
- Preceded by: Solomon Areda

Personal details
- Education: Addis Ababa University
- Occupation: Judge

Abeba Embaile Mengiste (Amharic: አበባ እምብያለ መንግስቴ) is an Ethiopian judge who is currently serving as Vice President of the Federal Supreme Court of Ethiopia since 17 January 2023, she was appointed with Tewodros Mihret by the House of Peoples' Representatives (HoPR).

== Previous positions ==
Abeba has studied School of Law at Addis Ababa University and served in different positions in public services as well as she was elected in African Union as advisory board against Corruption on 17 July 2023, serving two years. In the 6th regular session of the House of Peoples' Representatives (HoPR) held on 17 January 2023, Abeba was appointed as Vice President of the Federal Supreme Court of Ethiopia, succeeding Solomon Areda. She was confirmed with unanimous vote at the parliament.
