= Human trafficking in Ethiopia =

In 2009 Ethiopia was a source country for men, women, and children subjected to trafficking in persons, specifically conditions of forced labor and forced prostitution. Girls from Ethiopia's rural areas were forced into domestic servitude and, less frequently, commercial sexual exploitation, while boys were subjected to forced labor in traditional weaving, gold mining, agriculture, herding, and street vending. Small numbers of Ethiopian girls were forced into domestic servitude outside Ethiopia, primarily in Djibouti and Sudan, while Ethiopian boys were subjected to forced labor in Djibouti as shop assistants and errand boys.

Women from all parts of Ethiopia are subjected to involuntary domestic servitude throughout the Middle East and in Sudan, and many transit through Djibouti, Egypt, Libya, Somalia, or Yemen as they migrate to labor destinations. Ethiopian women in the Middle East face severe abuses, including physical and sexual assault, denial of salary, sleep deprivation, confinement, incarceration, and murder. Many are driven to despair and mental illness; some commit suicide. Some women are exploited in the sex trade after arriving at their destinations, particularly in brothels and near oil fields in Sudan.

Small numbers of low-skilled Ethiopian men migrate to Saudi Arabia, Arab states of the Persian Gulf, and other African nations, where they are subjected to forced labor. During the year, the Somali Regional Security and Administration Office increased recruitment for Special Police Forces and local militias. It was reported that both government-supported forces and insurgent groups in the Degehabur and Fiq Zones unlawfully recruited children, though these allegations could not be conclusively verified.

The Government of Ethiopia does not fully comply with the minimum standards for the elimination of trafficking; however, it is making significant efforts to do so. The government made progress over the past year in addressing transnational trafficking through significantly increased law enforcement efforts. Due in part to the establishment of the Human Trafficking and Narcotics Section in the Organized Crime Investigation Unit of the Federal Police, there was an increased emphasis on investigation and prosecution of international trafficking crimes, although the continued lack of investigations and prosecutions of internal trafficking crimes remained a concern. The government maintained its efforts to provide assistance to child trafficking victims identified in the capital region.

The U.S. State Department's Office to Monitor and Combat Trafficking in Persons placed Ethiopia in "Tier 2" in 2017 and in 2023.

The country ratified the 2000 UN TIP (Trafficking in Persons) Protocol in June 2012.

In 2023, the Organised Crime Index gave Ethiopia a score of 8 out of 10 for human trafficking, noting that the Ethiopian-Tigray war and other armed conflicts have both limited the government’s work on preventing trafficking and boosted the number of vulnerable people in the country.

An independent report in 2023 noted that the Horn of Africa (especially Djibouti) is a major transit point for Ethiopians being trafficked to Saudi Arabia, with an average of 12,000 people travelling through the country each month.

== Prosecution (2009) ==
Though the Ethiopian government has increased its efforts to prosecute and punish transnational trafficking offenders, prosecution of internal trafficking cases remains nonexistent. Article 635 of Ethiopia's Criminal Code (Trafficking in Women and Minors) criminalizes sex trafficking and prescribes punishments not exceeding five years' imprisonment. Articles 596 (Enslavement) and 597 (Trafficking in Women and Children) outlaw slavery and labor trafficking, and prescribe punishments of five to 20 years' rigorous imprisonment.

These articles have rarely been used to prosecute trafficking offences. Instead, Articles 598 (Unlawful Sending of Ethiopians to Work Abroad) and 571 (Endangering the Life of Another) are more often used to prosecute cases of transnational labor trafficking. The Federal High Court's 11th Criminal Bench heard all cases of transnational trafficking, as well as internal trafficking cases discovered in the Addis Ababa jurisdiction. Between March and October 2009, the bench heard fifteen cases related to transnational labor trafficking, resulting in five convictions, nine acquittals, and one withdrawal due to missing witnesses. Of the five convictions, three offenders received suspended sentences of five years' imprisonment, two co-defendants were fined, and one offender is serving a sentence of five years' imprisonment.

Thirty-one cases remained pending before the High Court at the end of the reporting period, including one involving alleged internal trafficking. The court successfully concluded the other eight cases, securing eight convictions under Articles 598 and 571 and ordering punishments ranging from five to twelve years' imprisonment, with no suspended sentences. In 2009, the Supreme Court's Justice Professionals Training Center incorporated anti-trafficking training into its routine training programs.

== Protection (2009) ==
Although the government lacked the resources to provide direct assistance to trafficking victims or to fund NGO's to provide victim care, police employed victim identification and referral procedures in the capital, regularly referring identified child victims to NGO's for care. During the year, Child Protection Units (CPUs) - joint police-NGO identification and referral teams operating in each of the 10 Addis Ababa police stations - rescued and referred children to the eleventh CPU in the central bus terminal, which is dedicated exclusively to identifying and obtaining care for trafficked children.

In 2009, this unit identified 1,134 trafficked children, an increase of 235 victims over the previous year. It referred 116 trafficked children to NGO shelters for care and family tracing, and reunified 757 children with parents or relatives in Addis Ababa and outlying regions. Local police and officials in the regional administrations assisted in the return of the children to their home areas; the Ethiopian Telecommunications Corporation provided free long-distance telephone service and the assistance of its employees across the country to enable the CPU to make contact with local officials.

The Addis Ababa City Administration's Social and Civil Affairs Department reunified 26 trafficked children with their families in the regions and placed five in foster care. While police encouraged victims’ participation in investigations and prosecutions, resource constraints prevented them from covering travel costs or providing other material resources to enable such testimony. There were no reports of trafficking victims detained, jailed, or prosecuted in 2009.

Limited consular services provided to Ethiopian workers abroad continued to be a weakness in the government's efforts. It did, however, increase the number of officers at some of its missions by as much as 300 percent in 2009, and its consulate in Beirut resumed limited victim services, including the operation of a small safe house, mediation with domestic workers’ employers, and visitation of workers held in the detention center. In July and December 2009, the Ethiopian Consulate General secured the release and repatriation of 42 and 75 victims, respectively, who were being held in Lebanon for immigration violations.

The government showed only nascent signs of engaging destination country governments in an effort to improve protections for Ethiopian workers and obtain protective services for victims. Trafficked women returning to Ethiopia relied heavily on the few NGOs working with adult victims and psychological services provided by the government's Emmanuel Mental Health Hospital. In 2009, the Addis Ababa City Administration provided land for use by 10 female victims repatriated from Djibouti as a site for a self-help project.

In addition, the Ministries of Foreign Affairs and Women's and Children's Affairs provided assistance to 75 victims repatriated from Lebanon in 2009, and assisted 12 victims repatriated from Israel with starting a cleaning business. The January 2009 Charities and Societies Proclamation prohibits, among other things, foreign-funded NGOs from informing victims of their rights under Ethiopian law or advocating on their behalf; these restrictions had a negative impact on the ability of NGOs to adequately provide protective services.

== Prevention (2009) ==
Ethiopia's efforts to prevent international trafficking increased, while measures to heighten awareness of internal trafficking remained negligible. In November 2009, the Ministry of Labor and Social Affairs (MOLSA) convened the Inter-Ministerial Task Force on Trafficking for the first time in more than two years. As a result, MOLSA and the Ministry of Foreign Affairs hosted a “National Conference on Human Trafficking and Illegal Migration” in March 2010, which undertook the drafting of a national action plan. The government continued to ban its citizens from traveling to Lebanon, Syria, and Qatar for labor purposes.

In July 2009, the government signed a bilateral labor agreement with the Government of Kuwait, which included provisions for increased anti-trafficking law enforcement cooperation; the agreement will become binding once it is passed by the House of People's Representatives, signed by the President, and published in the Gazette. Between July and December 2009, MOLSA's two full-time counselors provided 5,355 migrating workers with three-hour pre-departure orientation sessions on the risks of labor migration and the conditions in receiving countries; data was not available for the first half of the year. MOLSA also partnered with IOM to establish a database to track employment agencies authorized to send workers abroad, as well as worker complaints.

Private Employment Agency Proclamation 104/1998, which governs the work of labor recruitment agencies and protects migrant workers from fraudulent recruitment or excessive debt situations, which could contribute to forced labor, prescribes punishments of five to 10 years’ imprisonment. In August 2009, the government passed an amendment to this proclamation, Employment Exchange Services Proclamation No. 632/2009, outlawing extraneous commission fees, requiring agencies or their local affiliates to maintain a shelter for abused workers in each destination country, increasing agencies’ cash and bond deposits as collateral in the event the worker's contract is broken, and mandating the establishment of labor attaché positions in diplomatic missions abroad.

By 2009 Parliament had not appropriated funds for MOLSA to establish these positions. During that year, the Southern Nations, Nationalities, and People's Region (SNNPR) regional government provided free radio time to a local NGO to air anti-trafficking outreach programming. Ethiopia's primary school textbooks include instruction on child labor and trafficking. The government did not undertake efforts to reduce demand for commercial sex acts or forced labor during the reporting period. Before deploying soldiers on international peacekeeping missions, the government trained them on human rights issues, including human trafficking.

== See also ==
- Human rights in Ethiopia
- Women in Ethiopia
