= Meaza Ashenafi =

Ethiopian lawyer and judge (born 1964)

- መዓዛ አሸናፊ
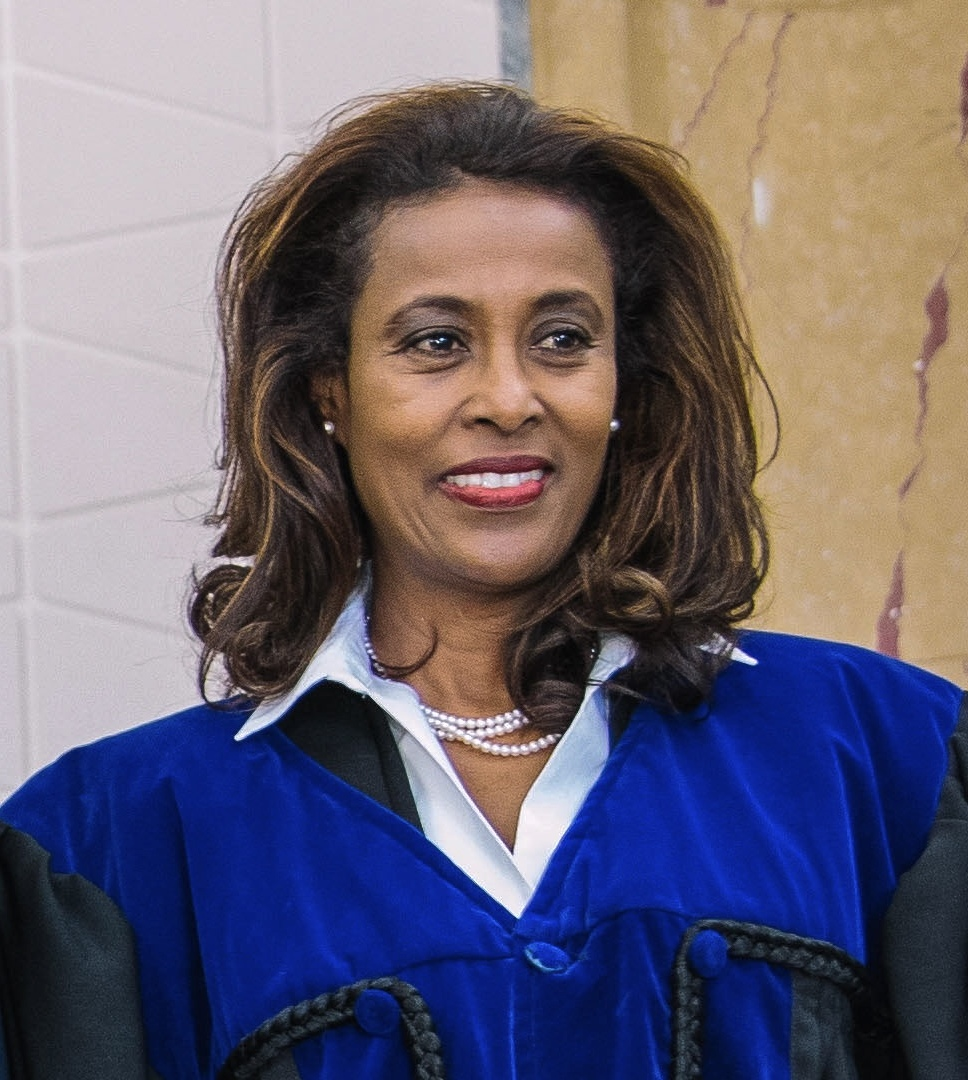
- Meaza in 2018

President of the Federal Supreme Court
- In office 1 November 2018 – 17 January 2023
- President: Sahle-Work Zewde
- Prime Minister: Abiy Ahmed
- Deputy: Solomon Areda
- Preceded by: Dagne Melaku
- Succeeded by: Tewodros Mihret

Judge of Federal High Court of Ethiopia
- In office 1989–1992

Legal Adviser Committee on 1995 Ethiopian Constitution

Founding Executive Director Ethiopian Women Lawyers Association
- In office 1996–2005

Founder and Chairperson of Enat Bank
- In office 2013–2017

Adviser on Gender and Women's Rights United Nations Economic Commission for Africa (UNECA)
- In office 2012–2018

Personal details
- Born: 25 July 1964 (age 62) Asosa, then in Gojjam Province, Ethiopian Empire (now in Benishangul-Gumuz Region, Ethiopia)
- Spouse: Araya Asfaw
- Children: 2
- Education: University of Connecticut (MA); Addis Ababa University (LLB)
- Occupation: Women's rights activist; Lawyer

Meaza Ashenafi (Amharic: መዓዛ አሸናፊ; born 25 July 1964) is an Ethiopian lawyer, jurist, and women's rights activist. In November 2018, she was appointed by the Federal Parliamentary Assembly as President of the Federal Supreme Court of Ethiopia until her resignation on 17 January 2023.

== Personal life and education ==
Meaza was born in Asosa, then in the Ethiopian Empire. She attended both elementary and high school in Asosa and join Addis Ababa University Law department. She received a Bachelor of Laws (LL.B.) from Addis Ababa University and Master of Arts (M.A.) degree in international relations and gender studies from the University of Connecticut. She is married to Dr. Araya Asfaw, Professor of Physics at Addis Ababa University, and they have two daughters together.

== Career ==
Meaza served as a Judge of the Federal Supreme Court of Ethiopia between 1989 and 1992. In 1993 she was appointed by the Ethiopian Constitution Commission as a legal adviser. In 1995, Meaza founded the Ethiopian Women Lawyers Association (EWLA) with Atsedeweine Tekle and Maria Yusuf, she would become its executive director. Through her legal contacts, she has been instrumental in campaigning for women's rights in Ethiopia; her Fighting For Women's Rights In Ethiopia group had approximately 45 graduate lawyers working for it in 2002.

Meaza has held a position with the United Nations Economic Commission for Africa. She played a part in the development of the first women's bank in Ethiopia, Enat Bank, which was established in 2011; as of 2016, she was chairing its board of directors. On 1 November 2018, Meaza appointed unanimously by HoPR as the President of the Supreme Court, being the first woman in the cabinet of Prime Minister Abiy Ahmed. After serving four years, she resigned that position with vice president Solomon Areda on 17 January 2023. The Ethiopian parliament appointed Tewdros Mihret as the president and Abeba Embiale as deputy president of the Supreme Court on behalf of Meaza and Solomon respectively.

== Political positions ==
In a 2009 speech Meaza was outspoken on the stereotypes that women face in Ethiopian society, making mention of Amharic proverbs for the way women are perceived, portraying them mostly as delicate and weak. The communications tradition over time has used these proverbs to advance men and degrade women. Some of the ideas given by these proverbs are that a woman's place is only in domestic duties and that women in general lack common sense and are irresponsible.

== Recognition ==
In 2003, Meaza became a Hunger Project Award laureate, winning the Grassroots Ethiopian Women of Substance Africa Prize, Two years later, she was nominated for the Nobel Peace Prize. Her most famous case was turned into the 2014 Ethiopian film Difret, which was promoted by Angelina Jolie as executive producer and went on to win the World Cinematic Dramatic Audience Award at the 2014 Sundance Film Festival.

== See also ==
- Women in Ethiopia

== Sources ==
- Woldeyes, Billene Seyoum (2014). Transformative Spaces: Enabling Authentic Female Leadership Through Self Transformation – the Association of Women in Business. LIT Verlag Münster. ISBN 978-3-643-90502-4.
