= Ethiopian Women Lawyers Association =

Women public association in Ethiopia

- Ethiopian Women Lawyers Association
- Abbreviation: EWLA
- Formation: 1995
- Purpose: Advancement of women
- Headquarters: Addis Ababa, Ethiopia
- Website: www.ewla-et.org

Ethiopian Women Lawyers Association (EWLA) is a women's public association. The organization has up to 12,000 annually volunteering women.

== History ==
EWLA was established in 1995 by Ethiopian women lawyers which included Maria Yusuf, Atsedeweine Tekle and Meaza Ashenafi among others. One of its main objectives is to tackle prejudice against women.
