= Murder of Hanna Lalango =

Kidnapping and murder of Ethiopian student

Death of Hanna Lalango
- Native name: ሀና ላላንጎ
- English name: Hana lalango
- Date: 1–11 October 2014
- Time: 4 pm (local time)
- Location: Addis Ababa, Ethiopia
- Type: Gang rape, kidnapping
- Deaths: Hanna Lalango
- Missing: 1 October 2014
- Suspects: 5
- Convicted: Kidnapping; Gang rape; Sexual abuse
- Trial: 14 days
- Sentence: Suspect Samson Sileshi and Bezabhi Gebremariam sentenced life imprisonment without parole; Bekalu G. Medihin, Aphrem Ayele and Temesgen Tsegaye have been sentenced to 17, 20 and 18 years in prison without the possibilities of parole

Sixteen-year-old Ethiopian school girl Hanna Lalango died on 1 November 2014, succumbing to injuries from a brutal kidnapping and gang rape by five men. Hanna was kidnapped and held captive for several days in Addis Ababa.

One of six children, she attended a private high school in Ayer Tena neighbourhood.

== Event ==
On 1 October, Hanna reportedly left school around 4 p.m. local time and entered a share taxi that already had a couple of passengers.

On 11 October 2014, Hanna was found unconscious in an abandoned area in the suburb of the city, near Qeranyo, and taken to hospital. For the next few days, the family took her to various referral hospitals, and waited to be admitted. Among other injuries, Hanna suffered from rectovaginal fistula and died 19 days after she was found. She reportedly identified three of the five suspects from her hospital bed.

== Arrests and trial ==
On 19 November 2014, police brought five suspects before the First Appearance Court in Addis Ababa. During a hearing attended by journalists and women's rights groups, one of the suspects pleaded guilty and all five denied the allegations, telling the court their initial confessions were obtained under duress. The police denied torturing the suspects and asked for 14 days to conduct further investigation. In that month, the final trial was heard in The Third Criminal Bench of the Lideta Federal High Court. The first suspect Samson Sileshi and Bezabhi G. Mariam was sentenced to life in prison without parole. The latter three, the 3rd, 4th and 5th defendants, Bekalu G. Medihin, Aphrem Ayele and Temesgen Tsegaye have been sentenced to 17, 20 and 18 years life in prison the same way.

== Reaction ==
The violence of the attack and the extent of her injuries caused a flood of outrage in Addis Ababa that found expression on social media. The incident and death of Hanna has thrown a spotlight on how cultural attitudes could have facilitated this act of violence. There was mass reaction from Facebook, protests were persisted in a Twitter page called #JusticeForHanna was formed thereafter.

== See also ==
- List of kidnappings
