= Billene Seyoum =

Ethiopian politician (born 1982)

- ቢለኔ ስዩም
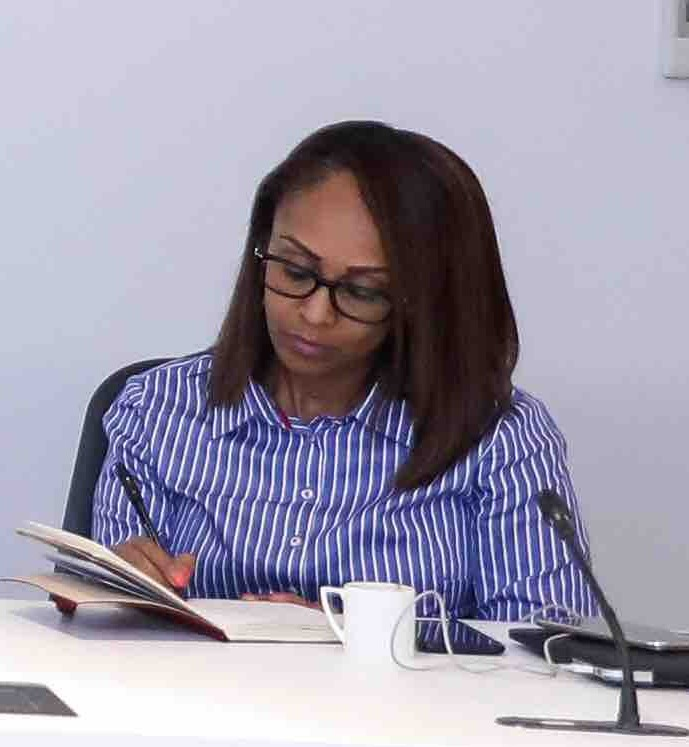
- Blilene in 2019

Foreign Press Secretary for the Office of Prime Minister of Ethiopia
- Incumbent
- Assumed office 5 November 2018
- Prime Minister: Abiy Ahmed
- Preceded by: Kassahun Gofe

Personal details
- Born: 1982 (age 43–44) Addis Ababa, Ethiopia
- Education: Addis Ababa University; University of British Columbia; University for Peace; University of Innsbruck
- Occupation: Poet; author

Billene Seyoum Woldeyes (Amharic: ቢለኔ ሥዩም ወልደየስ; born 1982) is an Ethiopian politician, poet and author who is serving as the Foreign Press Secretary for the Office of Prime Minister of Ethiopia since 5 November 2018. Billene speaks as the prime minister's foreign spokesperson in English.

== Early life ==
Billene was born in Addis Ababa, Ethiopia. She is the last born among three and has two brothers. She moved to Harare, Zimbabwe at a young age before moving to Canada and then back to Ethiopia.

In her book, Billene writes about this multinational upbringing, "I have spent half of my life outside of my birth country Ethiopia. Nevertheless, some norms of Ethiopiawinet (Ethiopianess) injected in me through socialization have sustained themselves throughout the years."

== Education ==
Upon finishing high school in Harare, Billene completed two years of college in Marketing Management at the Addis Ababa University, College of Commerce. She studied International Relations at the University of British Columbia, Vancouver from 2004 to 2008. Billene went on to obtain an MA in Gender and Peacebuilding from the University for Peace and later another MA in Peace, Security, Development and International Conflict Transformation at the University of Innsbruck, Austria.

== Career ==
Billene moved back to Addis Ababa at the end of 2010 and began her career there.

In 2010, three weeks later, she started her blog EthiopianFeminism. In 2012, she renamed the website to AfricanFeminism. AfricanFeminism is a digital African feminist platform that shares works of feminist African writers while encouraging dialogue. The purpose of the blog: "to understand similar issues on the continent and engage with other African feminists. It was also a response to the lack of Ethiopian voices on continental issues".

In 2011, Billene co-formed a spoken-word poetry collective called Zemneged-Andinet (meaning, "from a place of unity" in Amharic). Billene has stated that it consisted of "both English and Amharic writing poets who believe in words as a medium of artistic expression." The collective performed in venues in Addis Ababa.

From 2011 to 2013, Billene served as the Deputy Training Lead at the Institute of Peace and Security Studies - Africa Peace and Security Program in Addis Ababa.

In 2013, Billene was the president of Ethiopia's Association of Women in Business (AWiB).

In 2014, she published her book, Transformative Spaces: Enabling Authentic Female Leadership Through Self Transformation. The Case of AWiB.

Since 2010, she has published with multiple newsletters, including Pambazuka News, on topics that concern the rights of women and girls.

She has also served as an editor for the Association for Women's Sanctuary and Development (AWSAD)'s newsletter.

Billene has worked as a consultant on the Agricultural Growth Program-Agribusiness and Market Development (AGP-AMDe) project of ACDI-VOCA, where she worked on content development and management. The AGP-AMDe project aims to help enhance the capacity of Ethiopian small scale farmers.

In 2016, Billene was chosen to be an Acumen East African Fellow.

Billene is also the founder of a Social impact company Earuyan Solutions.

== Political career ==
Billene was one of the originators of the 50-50 gender balance concept for Ethiopian government. In an open letter addressed to Prime Minister, Abiy Ahmed, that was published by The Reporter, Billene Seyoum Weldeyes and Sewit Hailesellasie Tadesse pushed the Prime Minister to work towards gender equality and justice by recommending a few ideas that would strengthen the Prime Minister's commitment towards gender equality. Among them was a recommendation to create a 50-50 gender balance in the ministerial cabinet, Prime Minister's gender advisory group, CSO Law, the Women's rights Defenders Forum, and many more. Ahmed responded positively, appointing 10 female ministers when he formed his cabinet on the 16 October 2018.

Billene was then appointed as the Press Secretary for the Office of the Prime Minister of Ethiopia in November 2018, following the end of Government Communication Affairs Office (GCAO).

Multiple platforms have noted Billene's preference for not being addressed with the title Weizero or Weizerit (roughly translated to Mrs. or Miss.).

== Controversy ==
False information that Billene had been fired and replaced by Nigussie Tilahun surfaced around 2 January 2019. However, Billene continued to be the press secretary in charge of the English and digital media. Nigussu Tilahun did join the secretariat as press secretary, but to aid with the Amharic section.

== Works ==
=== Poetry ===
She is an author of multiple poems including Things I Imagine Telling My Daughter, Make It Happen, From Foetus to Woman and others.

Essays and Reflections

- "Modern slavery of Ethiopian women | Pambazuka News". www.pambazuka.org. Retrieved 2019-01-13.
- "Ethiopia: Violence against women on the rise | Pambazuka News". www.pambazuka.org. Retrieved 2019-01-15.

=== Book ===
- Woldeyes, Billene Seyoum (2014.)Transformative spaces : enabling authentic female leadership through self transformation - the case of AWiB. ISBN 3643905025. OCLC 900171333.
