= First Instance Court of Ethiopia =

First level division of court in Ethiopia

- የፌድራል የመጀመሪያ ደረጃ ፍርድ ቤት
- 9.036668°N 38.752889°E
- Established: 1 December 1998
- Jurisdiction: Ethiopia
- Location: John Melly St, Kirkos, Addis Ababa, Ethiopia
- Coordinates: 9.036668°N 38.752889°E
- Appeals to: Federal High Court
- Language: Amharic (working language); English

President
- Currently: Fuad Kiyar
- Since: 13 June 2019

The Federal First Instance Court (Amharic: የፌድራል የመጀመሪያ ደረጃ ፍርድ ቤት) is the first-level court division in Ethiopia. The FDRE Constitution delegates judicial jurisdiction to the First Instance Court, along with the High Court and State Courts. It is headquartered in Addis Ababa in Kirkos district, with expectations of expanding new branches in all districts of Addis Ababa.

== Proclamation ==
The criminal jurisdiction of Federal First Instance Court alongside High Court have the following duties and obligations under Federal Courts Proclamation No. 25/1996, which came to effect on 1 December 1998.

1. Under specified cases in criminal code article 4, 5 6 and 7 of Article 4 hereof:

2. Without prejudice to juridical law vested in other organs, the Federal First Instance Courts have jurisdiction in every province (awraja) or woreda courts as well as increasingly in the two chartered cities Addis Ababa and Dire Dawa.

3. Under sub-article 2(a) (b) new replacement of Article 16:

(a) Without prejudice to power vested on the Federal Judicial Administration Commission, place as well as assign and administer judges of Federal Courts:

- 4. In sub-article 3 of Article 16:
  - 3, the president of the Federal Supreme Court, where he deems it necessary, may:
    - (a) delegate part of his power or duties to the Federal High Court or Federal First Instance Court.
    - (b) In exercising power under sub-article 2(b) of this Article, solicit and obtain separate and joint views of the Presidents of the Federal Higher Court and the Federal First Instance Court, as concerns their respective court.
- 5. Under sub-article 1 and 2 new replacement of the Article 18:
  - 18, The powers and duties of the president of the Federal High Court and the Federal First Instance Court shall:
    - 1) represents the respective courts without prejudice of power and duties of the Federal Judicial Administration Commission, as well as administer judges of their respective courts, pursuant to delegation and in accordance with directives given by the President of the Federal Supreme Court.
    - 2) administering personnel of the respective courts, pursuant to delegation and in accordance with directives as under Article 16(3) hereof.

6. Article 23 hereby deleted and replaced by the following new Article 23:

- 23, Division of the Federal High Court and the Federal First Instance Court.
  - 1) With the Federal High Court, the First Instance Court has the following necessary functions:
  - 2) In both Federal High Court and First Instance Court, there shall be one judge in each division.
  - 3) However, there is provision of two and more presiding judges in sub-article 2 of this article:
    - (a) charges are brought by the special Public Prosecutor's Office pursuant to Proclamation No. 22/1992;
    - (b) civil cases heard by the Federal High Court in its appellate jurisdiction;
    - (c) any criminal cases heard by Federal Court and the Federal First Instance Court;
    - (d) Other cases specified under directives to be issued by the Federal Judicial Administration Commission.
  - 4) The President and Vice President of the First High Court and First Instance Court may preside over their respective courts where three judges sit.

== In other court system ==
The Addis Ababa City Charter established two city courts responsible to municipal jurisdiction: the First Instance and Appellate Courts. In social court system, there is fundamental error of law of decisions in the First Instance, and then put forward to Appellate Court of the city. Federal First Instance Court also functions in religious courts like Sharia law, as to Federal High Court of Sharia, accountable to the Federal Judicial Administration Commission.
