= Bethlehem Tilahun Alemu =

Ethiopian businesswoman

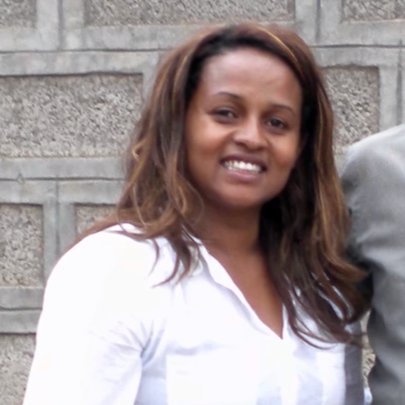
- Born: 1980 (age 45–46); Addis Ababa, Ethiopia
- Education: Unity University

Bethlehem Tilahun Alemu (born 1980) is an Ethiopian businesswoman, founder, and executive director of soleRebels, Africa's "fastest growing footwear company". Bethlehem has received honors and accolades for her business acumen, as well as her efforts to shift the discourse on Africa away from poverty to the continent's entrepreneurial spirit, social capital, and economic potential. Bethlehem launched "The Republic of Leather", designing sustainable luxury leather goods, and "Garden of Coffee" retail outlets to promote Ethiopian coffees.

== Early life ==
Bethlehem was born in the Zenebework area of Addis Ababa. Her parents worked at a local hospital. Alemu attended public primary and secondary schools, and then went on to study accounting at Unity University, graduating in 2004.

Bethlehem was the first female African entrepreneur to address the Clinton Global Initiative and was named Outstanding African Business Woman by African Business Awards in 2011.

== Business ventures ==
In early 2005, Bethlehem founded soleRebels to provide ecologically and economically sustainable jobs for her community. Seeing that many skilled artisans in her small community in Zenebework were living with chronic unemployment, she wanted to showcase their skills and offer work to those in her.

The soles of the shoes are made from recycled car tyres. Today, the company has stores all over the world, including in Ethiopia, Singapore, Switzerland and Taiwan.

Bethlehem is deeply proud of having been able to create global brands like soleRebels and Garden of Coffee.

== History ==
The company began out of a workshop on a plot of land owned by Bethlehem's grandmother in Zenebework.

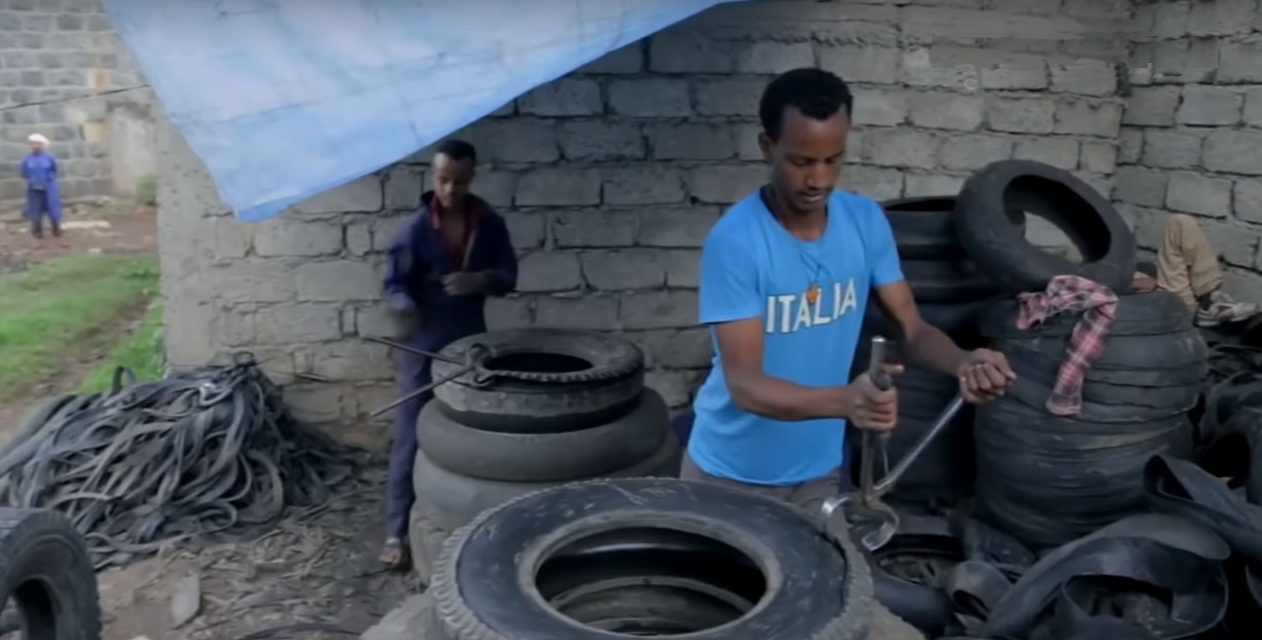
Tyres for shoes

SoleRebels has flourished, growing to 300 employees in Ethiopia, with distribution to thirty countries worldwide, selling to market kingmakers Whole Foods, Urban Outfitters and Amazon. Franchised and company-owned stores were planned to open in Austria, Switzerland, Taiwan, and the UK. Bethlehem wanted to create well-paid jobs which could create prosperity using the artisan talents and natural resources of Ethiopia. The selection of footwear as the launch product for the company came later. Bethlehem was inspired by the seleate or barabasso, the traditional recycled tire sole shoe crafted in Ethiopia, and footwear became the locus around which she chose to build the company.

In 2016 the company sold 125,000 pairs of shoes and it had created 1,200 jobs.

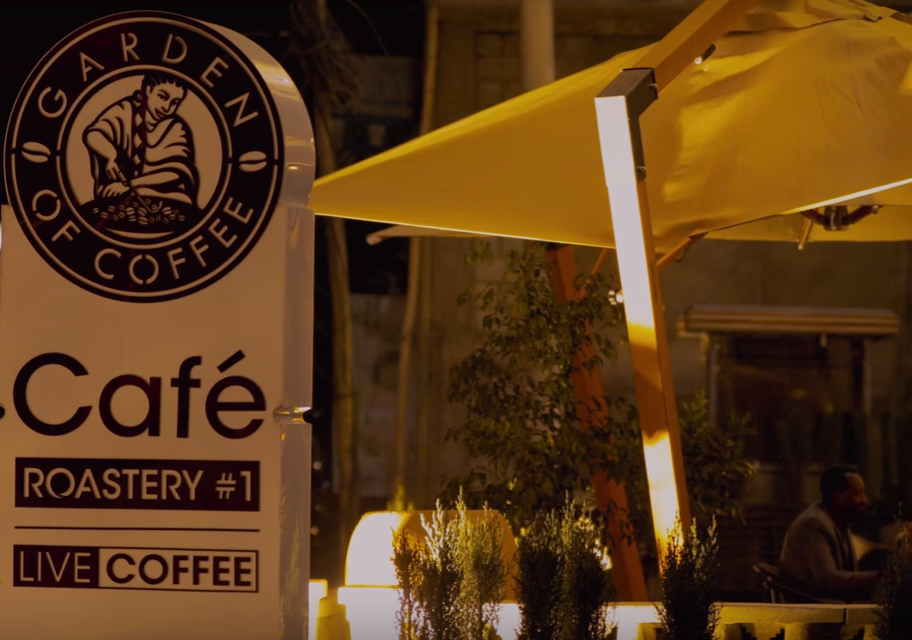
Garden Of Coffee in 2017

In 2014, Bethlehem announced a new business venture, The Republic of Leather, via a blog post on the soleRebels website. Bethlehem identified the luxury leather goods industry as being "ripe for a total re-imagining," along similar lines to what she had accomplished with soleRebels and the footwear industry. Besides espousing the same ideals of ecological and economic sustainability as soleRebels, The Republic of Leather is centered on principles of customer choice—customer choice of design, producer and receiving charity of 5% of the price they pay.

In 2017, "Garden of Coffee" was added to her companies. It begins with outlets in Addis Ababa.

== Philosophy ==
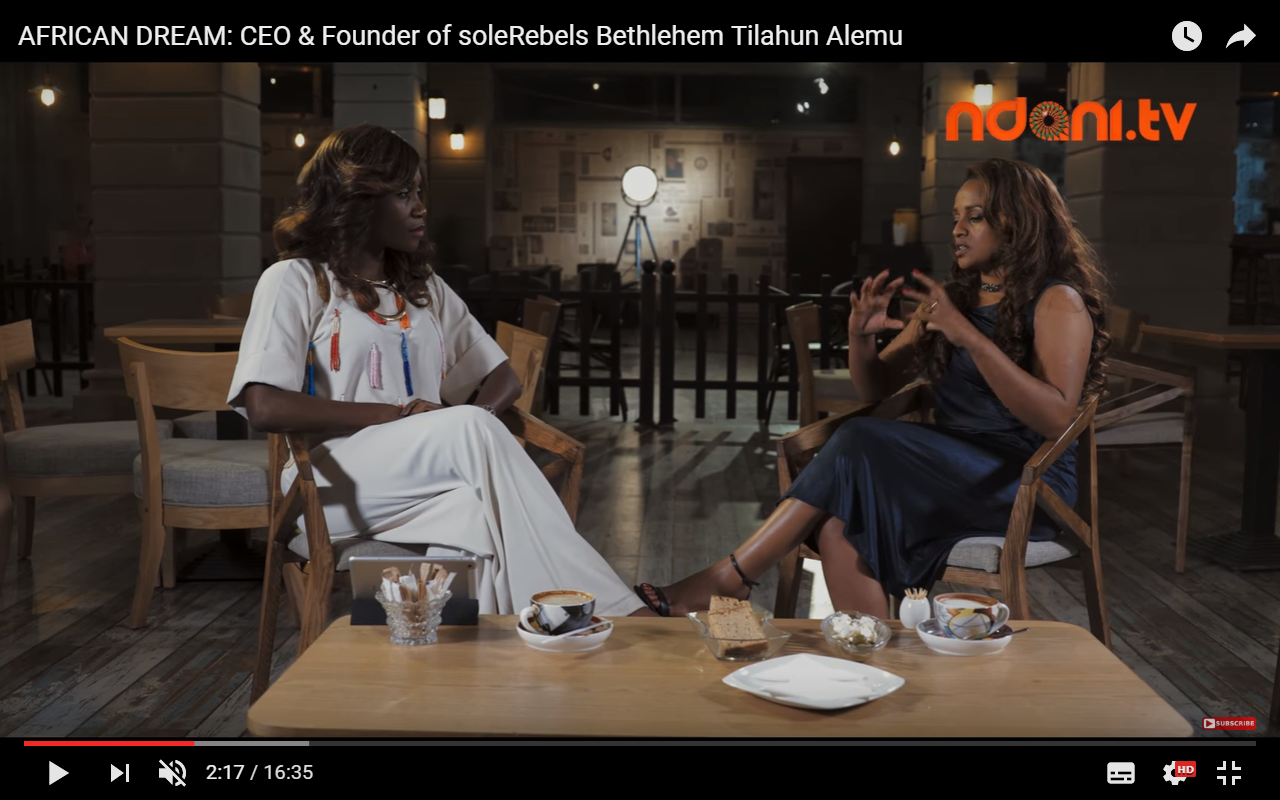
An interview on Nigerian TV

Bethlehem seeks to challenge the traditional narrative about Africa and in particular, Ethiopia, "countering the shibboleth that Africa and Africans don't know how to create their way to prosperity." Bethlehem believes Ethiopians must wrest control of their own narrative from the "people and elites with a vested interest in positioning Ethiopia as 'needing help' and specifically needing the 'help' they happen to be offering," as Bethlehem explained in an interview with The Next Woman. The global success of companies like soleRebels helps to dispel these old narratives and allows for Ethiopians to shape their own international image.

== Honors and accolades ==
- In 2011 Bethlehem was chosen by the World Economic Forum as a Young Global Leader.
- Bethlehem was listed on Forbes magazine's 20 Youngest Power Women in Africa in 2011
- In 2012 Alemu was included on Forbes '100 Most Powerful' and profiled as a "Woman to Watch."
- In 2012 Bethlehem was named by Business Insider as one of "Africa's Top 5 Female Entrepreneurs."
- In 2012 Bethlehem was chosen as NYC Venture Fellow by Mayor Bloomberg.
- In 2012 Bethlehem was chosen as one of Arise Magazine's "100 Dynamic Women," who are shaping modern Africa.
- In 2013 Bethlehem was listed as #62 in Fast Company's "100 Most Creative People in Business 2013."
- In 2013 Bethlehem was a Counsellor at that year's One Young World Summit.
- In 2013 Bethlehem was listed as one of Madame Figaro's "15 Most Powerful African Women."
- In 2013 Bethlehem was chosen to join the advisory board of the Green Industry Platform, convened by the United Nations Industrial Development Organization and the UN Environment Program.
- In 2013 Bethlehem was chosen by readers of The Guardian as one of "Africa's Top Women Achievers."
- In 2014 Bethlehem was named as one of CNN's "12 Female Entrepreneurs Who Changed the Way We Do Business."
