= Association for Women's Sanctuary and Development =

- Formation: 2003
- Type: Women's shelter
- Headquarters: Addis Ababa, Ethiopia
- Region served: Addis Ababa, Adama, Hawassa, Dessie, Debre Birhan, Weldiya and Semera
- Director: Maria Yusuf
- Website: www.awsadethiopia.org

Association for Women's Sanctuary and Development (AWSAD) is a women's shelter in Ethiopia. It is the first of its kind to be established in the country and began operations in 2003. AWSAD currently has various branches in several cities including Addis Ababa and Adama.

== History ==
AWSAD was founded by Maria Yusuf in 2003, she is currently also its director. The NGO also maintains a newsletter which Billene Seyoum served as editor.

The UN Women in collaboration with the Danish and Irish governments assisted AWSAD in launching the biggest women's shelter in the nation in 2015.

In 2019, United Nations Development Programme supported AWSAD in opening sanctuaries for victims of sexual violence in war-torn northern Ethiopia.

== Objective ==
The organization is dedicated to promoting the social and economic advancement of women while offering assistance to women and girls who experience physical and psychological harm.

Maria Yusuf, the director, asserts that there is a widespread epidemic of homelessness in the capital of Ethiopia that requires urgent attention and resolution:

"If you go around the city of Addis, you will find so many women with kids on the streets. If you ask them their problem, many will be survivors of violence. If we are not going to support these women who is going to do it? Who?"

== See also ==
- Women-only space
