= Oslo New University College =

Private college in Oslo, Norway

Coordinates: 59°55′54″N 10°44′44″E

- Oslo Nye Høyskole
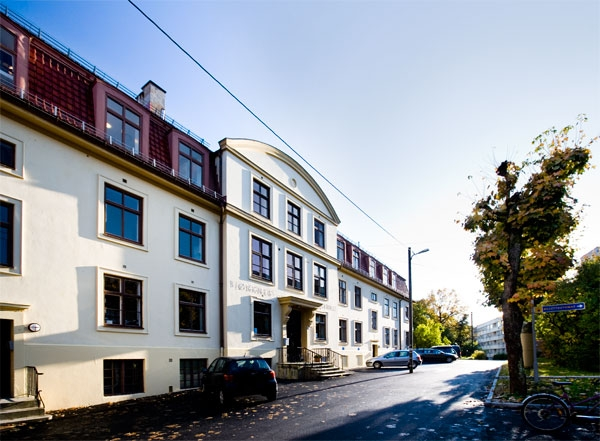
- Oslo New University College (2017)
- Type: Private regional college
- Students: 2,800
- Location: St. Hanshaugen (Oslo), Norway
- Campus: Urban / Online
- Website: oslonyehoyskole.no

Oslo New University College (Norwegian: Oslo Nye Høyskole) is a private, regional college offering courses at bachelor and masters level in health sciences, psychology, economics, digital marketing and humanities. Centrally located in Adamstuen in Oslo, Norway, the college has an enrollment of approx. 4500 students. Oslo New University Collega offer courses both on campus and online.

Oslo New University College offers bachelor’s degrees, master’s degrees, one-year programmes, individual courses and continuing education in a range of academic fields. Its programmes include:

- Psychology
- Human resources
- Business and administration
- Digital marketing
- Project management
- Medicine, dentistry and health
- Nutrition
- Intelligence studies
- Political science and international relations

== Accreditation ==
The programmes offered by Oslo New University College are accredited by NOKUT.

== Online studies ==
Oslo New University College has extensive experience in online education and offers online programmes across all its academic fields.

== Qybele ==
The digital learning platform, Qybele, is used by both online and campus-based students. The platform brings together lectures, learning resources, assignments, messages and examination information in one place.

Qybele was developed by Oslo New University College and is continuously improved based on feedback from students, administrative staff and the academic community.
