= Federal Judicial Administration Council =

Ethiopian quasi-judicial body

The Federal Judicial Administration Council (FJAC) is an Ethiopian quasi-judicial body that adjudicates and ensures separation of powers of state and federal courts in the judicial system of Ethiopia. Under Article 55(1) of FDRE Constitution, the FJAC manages federal courts and judges and non-judicial personnels working with federal courts.

== Function ==
The Federal Judicial Administration Council (FJAC) selects candidates for judges and oversees conduct rule for federal judges. Its major activity is to ensure all judicial functions are free from internal and external influence. This is to ensure the courts' complete independence and accountability. Under Article 55(1) of the FDRE Constitution Proclamation No. 1233/2021, the FJAC has powers over federal courts and federal judges appointed with all levels and non-judicial personnel working with federal courts.

Before FJAC regional states were not able to distinguish state from federal matters. They expected to reimburse costs they were not entitled to. The Federal Supreme Court allocates compensatory budget without considering the number of federal cases that can adjudicated by state courts. The Supreme Court can calculate costs incurred as the state courts delegated federal judicial power. This would cause a gap in the judicial structure, which is dependent on constitutional and legislative measures.
