= Federal Supreme Court of Ethiopia =

Highest court in Ethiopia

- የኢትዮጵያ ፌድራል ጠቅላይ ፍርድ ቤት
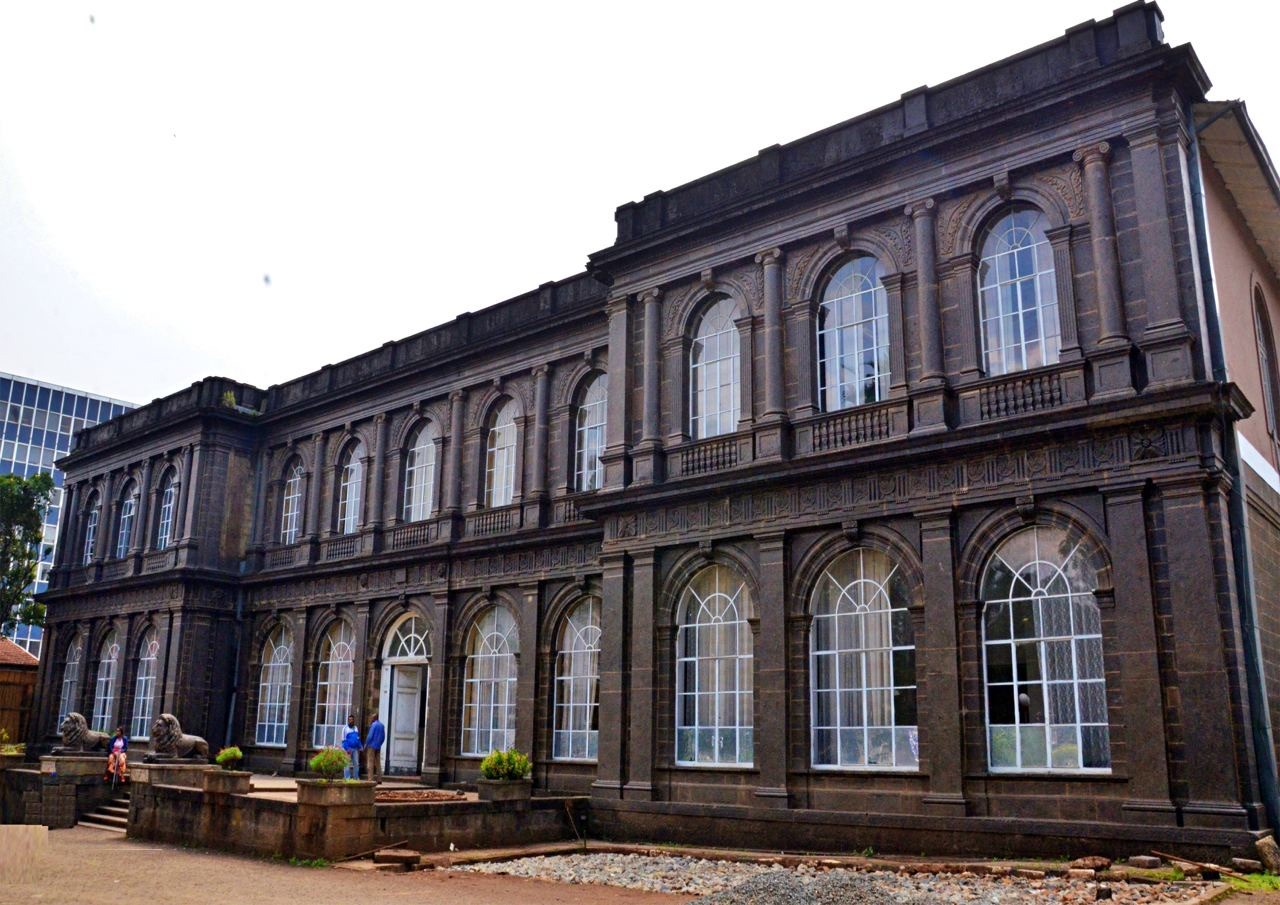
- Interactive map of Federal Supreme Court of Ethiopia
- 9.042269°N 38.761040°E
- Established: 1994
- Jurisdiction: Ethiopia
- Location: King George VI St, Lideta, Addis Ababa, Ethiopia
- Coordinates: 9.042269°N 38.761040°E
- Appeals from: High Court
- Language: Amharic (working language); English
- Website: www.fsc.gov.et

President
- Currently: Tewodros Mihret
- Since: 17 January 2023

Vice President
- Currently: Abeba Embiale
- Since: 17 January 2023

The Federal Supreme Court of Ethiopia (Amharic: የኢትዮጵያ ፌድራል ጠቅላይ ፍርድ ቤት) is the highest court in Ethiopia. It was established by the Federal Democratic Republic of Ethiopia constitution in 1994 and is currently located in Addis Ababa. Article 78 of the Constitution establishes the judiciary and at the top is the FSC. By the Constitution, the Federal Supreme Court has "the power of cassation over any final court decision containing a basic error of law". In 2018, Prime Minister Abiy Ahmed appointed Meaza Ashenafi to be the first female president of the Federal Supreme Court. Solomon Areda Waktolla was appointed as Vice President of the Federal Supreme Court. Both were resigned by the Parliament on 17 January 2023, and replaced by Tewodros Mihret and Abeba Embiale as Chief Justice and Deputy Chief Justice of the Supreme Court respectively.

== History and overview ==
After the People's Democratic Republic of Ethiopia (PDRE) was toppled, the Ethiopian Peoples' Revolutionary Democratic Front (EPRDF) that was dominated by the Tigray People's Liberation Front (TPLF) formed the federal system that exists today. Within the three year transition from the PDRE, the 1995 constitution was drafted and developed. It was officially adopted in 1994 which created the federal and state governments in Ethiopia. The constitution was able to establish judicial, executive, and legislative powers for the federal and state governments. However, the framers of the constitution (who did not trust the judiciary under the PDRE) entrusted the House of Federation (HoF) instead of the courts for solving the issues that may develop between the governmental powers.

=== Overview of FSC ===
The Federal Supreme Court of Ethiopia was created by the 1995 constitution. The constitution was able to successfully establish a dual court system. In the constitution, the Federal Supreme Court was given "supreme federal judicial authority". Over federal issues and matters, the Federal Supreme Court is given the final word. With the mandate, the regional states in Ethiopia were able to develop and create their own supreme, high, and first-instance courts. The Federal Supreme Court resolves the disputes over jurisdiction that may be among those federal and municipal courts in Dire Dawa along with Addis Ababa.

=== Council of Constitutional Inquiry ===
The ability to interpret the constitution and decide on cases that entertain these constitutional issues is given to the House of Federation instead of the courts. The Council of Constitutional Inquiry ("CCI") was created in addition to the House of Federation in order to help the HoF in interpretation and investigation of constitutional issues. The CCI has eleven members. Six of the members are legal scholars and three are from the HOF. The President of the Supreme Court acts as the chairperson of the CCI. The Vice President of the Supreme Court is on the CCI as well and acts as the deputy chairperson. The role that the CCI has on constitutional review is advisory. If the courts believe there is a case needing constitutional interpretation, they submit those cases to the HOF and CCI.

=== Jurisdiction ===
The jurisdiction that the Federal Supreme Court has is very limited and exceptional. Through the constitution, it is given the highest and final judicial power over federal issues. The FSC is the highest court of appeal in the Ethiopian federal judiciary. It has "first instance" and "appellate" jurisdiction. The abuses of the federal government and the offenses that exist, offenses where international diplomats are liable for are under the "first instance" jurisdiction.

== Membership ==
The Federal Supreme Court consists of 11 judges. The judges appointed serve until their retirement. The President and Vice President of the Federal Supreme Court of Ethiopia are appointment by the House of Peoples' Representatives after nomination by the Prime Minister. As of January 2023, the President is Tewodros Mihret. The judiciary has been criticized as operating by the incumbent party. The nomination of Meaza Ashefani by Prime Minister Abiy Ahmed has been publicized as a way to make the judiciary more independent. As of November 2018, the Vice President is Soloman Areda Waktolla. Other judges for federal courts are selected by the Federal Judicial Administrative Council (a group of 10 members chaired by the President of the FSC) and submitted to the HoPR by the Prime Minister for appointment. Article 81 of the Constitution gives the Prime Minister the ability to nominate the members of the FSCR and Article 83 allows the resolution of constitutional disputes by the HOR.

== Cassation ==
The Federal Supreme Court has the power of cassation over state matters which creates controversy among legal scholars and officials (lawyers and judges within the country). This is the only power that is reserved for the FSC by the Constitution. There is a panel of five or more federal judges that make the decision. The Federal Supreme Court cassation division reviews the final decisions on federal issues. In addition, the FSC is given the ability to review the final decisions of the State Supreme Court. The State Supreme Court is also given this cassation power however the division within the FSC goes over the final decisions of a State Supreme Court. This decision by the cassation division creates a precedent that is binding. Because the State Supreme Court is given such power, it leads to cassation over cassation. One of the reasons this remains a highly controversial issue is that the line of jurisdiction become hazy. There is no definite meaning in the Constitution that delineates the difference between a federal and state legal issue.

== See also ==
- Kemal Bedri
