= Law in Africa =

Legal systems in Africa's 56 sovereign states

Africa's fifty-six sovereign states range widely in their history and structure, and their laws are variously defined by customary law, religious law, common law, Western civil law, other legal traditions, and combinations thereof.

Prior to the colonial era in the nineteenth century, Africa's legal system was dominated by the traditional laws of the native people. The efforts to maintain the indigenous practices against the rising Continental European and Great British powers, though unsuccessful, provoked the development of existing customary laws via the establishment of ‘Native Courts’. While the colonies were governed by the imported legal system and civil codes of the metropoles, the practice of traditional laws continued under supervision, with its jurisdiction restricted to only African citizens.

Following its absolute political independence political independence in the late 1970s, post-colonial Africa continued to employ these introduced laws, with some nations preserving the colonial legislation more than others. In contemporary Africa, the African Union is involved in the development of the continent's legal matters with objectives to promote democratic institutions, encourage unity between the legal systems of the African countries, improve international relations and protect human rights.

== History of African Law ==
The law of modern Africa exists as a conglomerate of legal practices and systems, otherwise labeled as legal pluralism. This is derived from its traditional ancestry, diverse colonial legacy and post-independence.

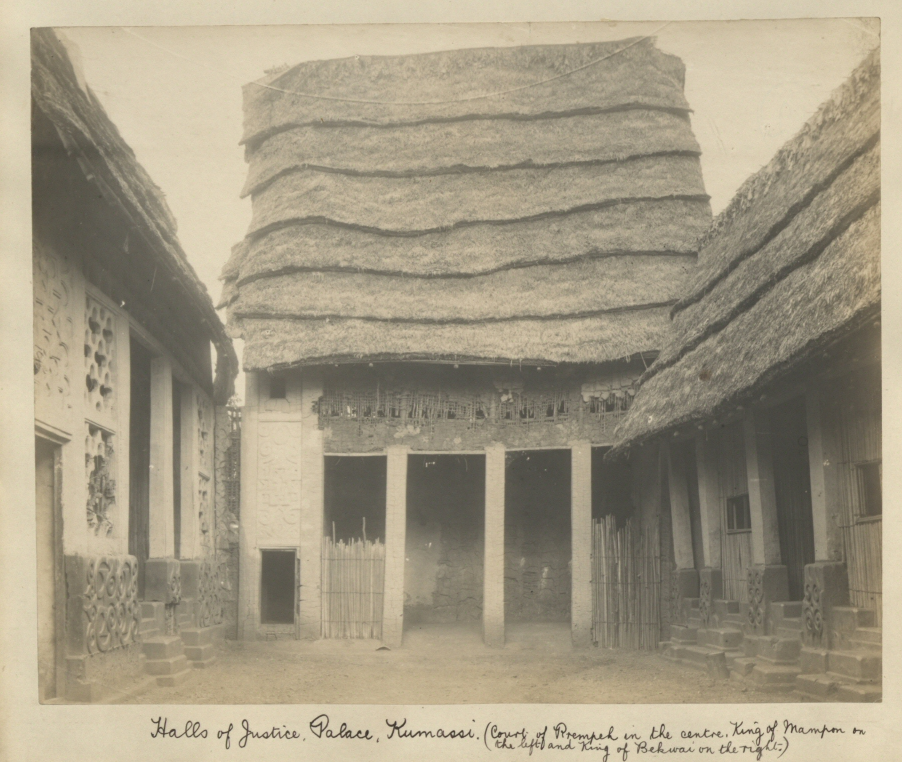
Historical Great court of the Ashanti Empire in poor condition between the late 19th and early 20th centuries.

Prior to colonisation, the indigenous laws of the African continent were implemented based on the customs and practice of ethnic populations. Formal courts were uncommon, but the natives followed these traditions as a means of settling communal matters from which the operation of such legal adjudication depended on the political development of each native circle. Despite the legislative advancements of respective communities, many indigenous laws were uncodified and exclusively managed through oral practice. Some of the oldest legal systems began first in Africa. For instance, Ancient Egyptian law used a civil code, based on the concept of Ma'at. Tradition, rhetorical speech, social equality and impartiality were key principles. Judges kept records, which was used as precedent, although the systems developed slowly.
The Malian constitution, Kouroukan Fouga, was proclaimed in 1222–1236 AD, enumerating regulations in both constitutional and civil matters. It is transmitted to this day by griots under oath.

By the early 1900s, along with the dominant colonial powers of France and Great Britain, Belgium, Germany, Portugal and Italy had gained political control over numerous African nations. Upon colonisation, the British and European empires prioritised the establishment of the common law and civilian law respectively in their own colonies. In response to these foreign politics, the African authorities promptly developed their indigenous practices and customs into a formal legal system introduced as customary law, administered by the newly established Native Courts. As the imported doctrines and codes took precedence in their associated metropoles, these efforts were largely unsuccessful. However, the British policy enabled the customary laws to operate within local communities under the governance of colonial legislation executed by judges and magistrates; with its jurisdiction restricted to only African citizens.

The decolonisation of Africa began with the events of World War I which observed a rise in resistance against foreign authorities. Germany was one of the first European continental powers to lose its control over Southwest Africa, followed by the retreat of the Italian, Belgium, Portugal, and Spanish forces by 1976. The liberation of Indian and Asian colonies further inspired the struggle for independence. Ghana was one of the first British colonies to be granted independence in 1957, with Southern Rhodesia not being freed until 1980. Comparatively, French colonies first granted independence to Tunisia and Morocco in 1956 and finally retreated from the continent after liberating Djibouti more than 20 years later in 1977.

After achieving absolute independence, the African nations were obliged to reconcile the different legal practices, into a unified form that would be suitable for the state and its people. The means of achieving this differed between nations, as Nigeria and Kenya for example, were inclined to further adopt the British legislation following independence. As they were familiar with the foreign institutions, rather than constructing a legal system of their own, lawyers were sent to the United Kingdom to further study the common laws. However, the application of these various sources of law proved to be unsuccessful as they did not cater to the African populace as initially presumed. Comparatively, the primary sources of South Africa law were Roman-Dutch and English Common law, imports of Dutch settlements and British colonialism, which is sometimes termed Anglo-Dutch law.

Hence, pluralistic systems were devised by nations that combined the customary law, inherited penal codes and religious laws depending on the ancestral history, colonial legacy and dominant theology specific to their geography.

== Types of Legal Systems ==
=== Customary Law ===
African customary law is derived from the traditional customs and practices of the various indigenous groups of Africa. Due to the diversity of traditional practices originating from many tribal populations, African customary law is not a uniform set of customs of any given country, rather there are variations between regional areas depending on the ethnic origin.

The establishment of the Native Courts and the formal introduction of customary law was a revolutionary development in Africa; however, the official codification of such unwritten laws occurred after decolonisation. For many years post-independence, the customary law governed personal matters and communal issues such as disputes on land possession and appointing a successive chief.

As the philosophies of customary legislation promote the integration of reconciliation, social justice and restoration of tribal groups, there is rising support for customary law and its capacity to better accommodate for the values of African citizens and their social experience. With the adoption of statutory features, customary law is now becoming better reflected into the formal legal systems of the African states, induced by the need to conserve traditional customs that have been repressed by colonial experiences and the rising advocacy for cultural rights. Subsequently, the mechanisms of customary law are becoming more widely implemented outside of small communities for civil and criminal matters through its traditional justice system.

However, the employment of customary law differs greatly between nations and this is based on conditions for human rights and conflicts with the western laws employed. For example, Kenya has abolished its customary criminal laws, retaining only offenses surrounding marriage relations, due to inconsistencies with the British common law system. Despite this, Kenya has been proficient in the codification of laws from different tribes and local communities, though not to integrate them into their current legal system, but rather enable the possibility of translating cultural customs into a more contemporary form.

Alternatively, a polycentric legal system, called Xeer developed exclusively in the Horn of Africa more than a millennium ago and is still widely used by the Somali people. Under this system, elders serve as judges and help mediate cases using precedents. Xeer is a good example of how customary law can work in lieu of civil law and is a good approximation of what is thought of as natural law. Several scholars have noted that even though Xeer may be centuries old, it has the potential to serve as the legal system of a modern, well-functioning economy. The Xeer also shows how influential a system of laws can be with regard to the development of a culture. According to one report, the Somali nation did not begin with the common use of the Somali language by the Somali clans, but rather with the collective observance of Xeer.

=== Western Law ===
The basis of western law in Africa is characterised by the English common law and continental European civil law. Following colonisation, many foreign governments retained the pre-existing native laws by which Africa's dual legal system was produced. As the imported laws took precedence, over time, even local courts in the English metropoles employed tax prosecutions and British disciplines surrounding work and labour contracting.

The African common and civil law remains relatively similar to what has been left behind by the colonising powers, though the employment of such laws varies between nations. Currently, the formal courts greatly contribute to how the rule of civil or common law is maintained in each nation.

Derived from Roman traditions, the European systems of justice were characterised by the objective to expand an empire and regulate the citizens via the inquisitorial system. In court, this system requires the judge to actively participate in settling legal matters by gathering evidence and hosting witness testimonies to make an informed conclusion of the truth
Comparatively, the introduction of common law from British colonisers employed the notion of protecting individual rights from the state through an adversarial system of justice. Formal debates take place in the presence of a jury and judge, but unlike the inquisitorial system, the courts established under common law only require the judge to oversee the opposing positions on the case and make an informed decision on the evidence presented to them in court.

A comparative study by Sandra Joireman in 2001 between the two western legal systems in Africa, found that the British common law systems are more effective in providing their rule of law than the European civil law practices. Joireman explains that this difference can be attributed to the differences in economic status between African states, as the gross national product per capita is a strong indicator of a nation's ability to train its judiciary and by consequence, establish its legal institutions. Additionally, a better colonial experience under British rule and greater native knowledge on their policies have also been identified as plausible explanations for this difference.

The absence of such juridical security prompted the establishment of the organisation for the Harmonization of African Business Laws (OHADA), following a treaty signed between francophone African countries in October 1993. Its objective surrounds the need for a “modern harmonized legal framework in the area of business law in order to promote investment and develop economic growth”. The organisation's strategy is currently involved in studying the common features between the different legal systems in African and how to overcome barriers to education in poor populations.

=== Religious Law ===
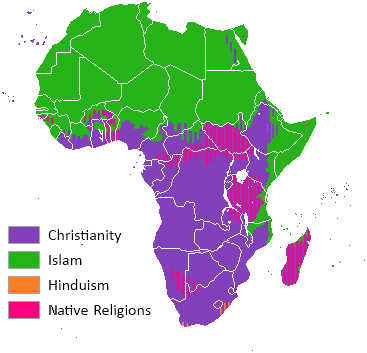
Map of Africa that shows the distribution of the major religions across the continent in 2008

Islam, Christianity and African traditional religions are the dominant faiths in Africa with Judaism, Hinduism and Buddhism being exclusive to regions and their populations.
In many tribal societies, religion is perceived as a product of Western colonialism, responsible for the diminution of traditional religious practices. Hence, foreign religions are condemned in native circles and proscribed from the customary laws and institutions that they follow.

During British and European colonisation, Christian laws were introduced by missionaries, until eventually, courts began introducing Christian marriage principles. While the imported constitution was employed in association to Christian belief, most African nations today separate the church and state to best accommodate for the freedom of religion. However, in many circumstances, such as community service, the state and church often collaborate due to common interests.

Islamic law is prevalent in numerous African nations in the form of Sharia Law which follows the teachings of the Quran. The relationship between Islamic law and the formal national legal system, largely depends on the state. In the past, the integration of Islamic Law and national law were deeply rooted, by which the Sharia court appeals were taken to High Courts. Over time, legal reform reduced the involvement of religion in legal matters. In northern Nigeria, a Muslim country, the Islamic criminal laws were abolished in 1960, but some common Islamic offences such as drinking alcohol and unlawful sexual intercourse adultery were retained in the revised system. This was followed by legal reform in Kenya, Tanzania, Ghana, and Uganda where legal matters of marriage, divorce and inheritance were no longer regulated by Islamic practice.

== Law by Countries ==
- Law of Algeria
- Law of Angola
- Law of Benin
- Law of Botswana
- Law of Burkina Faso
- Law of Burundi
- Law of Cameroon
- Law of Canary Islands
- Law of Cape Verde
- Law of Central African Republic
- Law of Ceuta
- Law of Chad
- Law of Comoros
- Law of the Republic of the Congo
- Law of the Democratic Republic of the Congo
- Law of Djibouti
- Law of Egypt
- Law of Equatorial Guinea
- Law of Eritrea
- Law of Eswatini
- Law of Ethiopia
- Law of Gabon
- Law of the Gambia
- Law of Ghana
- Law of Guinea
- Law of Guinea-Bissau
- Law of Ivory Coast
- Law of Kenya
- Law of Lesotho
- Law of Liberia
- Law of Libya
- Law of Madagascar
- Law of Madera
- Law of Malawi
- Law of Mali
- Law of Mauritania
- Law of Mauritius
- Law of Mayotte
- Law of Melilla
- Law of Morocco
- Law of Mozambique
- Law of Namibia
- Law of Niger
- Law of Nigeria
- Law of Republic of Congo
- Law of Réunion
- Law of Rwanda
- Law of Saint Helena
- Law of São Tomé and Príncipe
- Law of Senegal
- Law of Seychelles
- Law of Sierra Leone
- Law of Somalia
- Law of South Africa
- Law of Sudan
- Law of Tanzania
- Law of Togo
- Law of Tunisia
- Law of Uganda
- Law of Western Sahara
- Law of Zambia
- Law of Zimbabwe

== International law ==
The African Union (AU) is a pan-African organisation formally established in July 2002. The Union was further developed from its predecessor, The Organisation of African Unity and modelled using the framework of the European Union. The primary objective of the AU was to encourage political cooperation between the African states and promote intercontinental economic progression. In order to achieve these goals, the Constitutive Act of the African Union and Protocol on Amendments to the Constitutive Act, were designed as strategic frameworks with the following objectives:

- Achieve greater unity and solidarity between African countries and their people
- Defend the sovereignty, territorial integrity and independence of its Member States;
- Accelerate the political and socio-economic integration of the continent;
- Promote and defend African common positions on issues of interest to the continent and its peoples;
- Encourage international cooperation
- Promote peace, security, and stability on the continent;
- Promote democratic principles and institutions, popular participation and good governance;
- Promote and protect human and peoples’ rights in accordance with the African Charter on Human and Peoples’ Rights and other relevant human rights instruments;
- Establish the necessary conditions which enable the continent to play its rightful role in the global economy and in international negotiations;
- Promote sustainable development at the economic, social and cultural levels as well as the integration of African economies;
- Promote cooperation in all fields of human activity to raise the living standards of African peoples;
- Coordinate and harmonise the policies between the existing and future Regional Economic Communities for the gradual attainment of the objectives of the Union;
- Advance the development of the continent by promoting research in all fields, in particular in science and technology
- Work with relevant international partners in the eradication of preventable diseases and the promotion of good health on the continent.
- Ensure the effective participation of women in decision-making, particularly in the political, economic and socio-cultural areas;
- Develop and promote common policies on trade, defence and foreign relations to ensure the defence of the Continent and the strengthening of its negotiating positions;
- Invite and encourage the full participation of the African Diaspora as an important part of our Continent, in the building of the African Union.

Now, the continental body comprises 55 member states of Africa that collaborate to achieve these goals.

== See also ==
- Journal of Legal Pluralism
- Legal history
- Legal systems of the world
