= S v Francis =

Criminal case in South Africa

S v Francis is an important case in South African criminal law. It deals with that subdivision of the principle of legality known as the ius acceptum rule in statutory crimes: the rule stipulating that a court may convict an accused of a crime only if the type of act which he committed is recognised by the law—in this instance the statutory law as a crime.

== Facts ==
The accused, who had been an inmate of a rehabilitation centre, was charged with having absconded from the centre: that is, of having run away from the centre without the permission of the superintendent of the centre. The State charged the accused with contravening a certain regulation, promulgated in terms of an Act of 1971 which dealt with rehabilitation centres. This regulation made it clear that the act which the accused had allegedly committed constituted a crime. In 1992, however, the 1971 Act, as well as the regulations promulgated in terms of it, was repealed and replaced by a new Act, which dealt with the same topic. The 1992 Act contained no provisions creating crimes: that is, no provision stating clearly that a certain act or failure to comply with a certain provision in the Act or any regulation constituted a crime.

The accused's alleged absconding from the rehabilitation centre took place in 1993. At that time the 1971 Act was no longer in force; it had been replaced by the 1992 Act. The question the court had to decide was whether there existed any crime under which the accused could be charged.

== Judgment ==
Ackermann J found it to be very significant that, considering the provisions of the earlier 1971 Act in this regard, the 1992 Act made no mention of any criminal jurisdiction of the magistrate's court. At first glance this was a strong indication that the legislature wished to remove from the criminal sphere the maintenance of discipline in the treatment centres and registered treatment centres, and to leave these matters exclusively in the hands of the superintendent of these centres (or another person who had been appointed for this purpose by the management of the centre).

The principle of legality was also of importance here. Ackermann J agreed with Snyman: In criminal law this principle "fulfils," as Snyman put it, "the important task of preventing the arbitrary punishment of people by state officials, and of ensuring that the determination of criminal liability and the passing of sentence correspond with clear and existing rules of law." In this respect Snyman distinguished between a legal norm, a criminal norm and a criminal sanction, and illustrated the differences as follows:

A statutory prohibition may be stated in one of the following three ways:

(a) you may not travel on a train without a ticket;

(b) you may not travel on a train without a ticket and anybody contravening this provision shall be guilty of a criminal offence;

(c) you may not travel on a train without a ticket and anybody contravening this provision shall be guilty of an offence and punishable with imprisonment for a maximum period of three months or a maximum fine of R600, or both such imprisonment and fine.

Provision (a) contains a simple prohibition that constitutes a legal norm, but not a norm in which a crime is created. Although non-fulfilment of the regulation may well lead to administrative action (such as putting the passenger off at the next stop) it does not contain a criminal norm. A court will not, without strong and convincing indications to the contrary, hold that such a regulation has created a crime. Provision (b) does contain a criminal norm, because of the words "shall be guilty of an offence". However, it does not contain a criminal sanction because there is no mention of the punishment that should be imposed. Provision (c) contains both a criminal norm and criminal sanction. The criminal sanction is contained in the words "and be punishable with imprisonment for a maximum period of three months or a maximum fine of R600, or both such imprisonment and fine". If a statutory provision creates a criminal norm only, but remains silent on the criminal sanction, as in provision (b) above, the punishment is simply at the court's discretion, that is, the court itself can decide what punishment to impose. In the unlikely event of a statutory provision containing a criminal sanction, but not a criminal norm, in all probability the court will decide that the legislature undoubtedly intended to create a crime, and will assume that a crime was indeed created."

As Snyman then pointed out, however, South African courts had not always strictly observed these principles. In R v Forlee, the accused was charged with contravening a statutory provision which forbade the purchase of opium. The prohibition was taken over from an earlier Act in which the purchase of opium was expressly declared a crime. In the new Act, which replaced the previous one, the criminal sanction (the provisions declaring the purchase to be a crime) was omitted. the Court remarked as follows:

If this omission were intentional, then the Legislature considered either that the common law provided a penalty or that no penalty should be imposed at all. The latter conclusion is negatived by the whole tenor of those statutes [... T]he reasonable assumption is that the Legislature, whilst intending the prohibition to be absolute and effective, overlooked the absence of any expressed penalty [...]. It is clear that no law of this kind can be effective without a penalty; and the argument that the Courts must therefore be held to have the power to inflict a penalty, wherever the Legislature has intended to create an offence, is of considerable weight.

The court concluded: "We have come to the conclusion that the same principle applies in Roman-Dutch law, and that as the act in question was expressly an offence, it is punishable under our law." The court relied among other things on a rule which it formulated as follows: "The doing of an act which is expressly forbidden by the Legislature upon grounds of public policy constitutes an indictable offence, even though no penalty be attached."

The principle laid down in Forlee had been followed in the Appellate Division in R v Langley and R v Baraitser, but had been strongly criticised by De Wet and Swanepoel, and by Rabie and Strauss. Ackermann J quoted Snyman to the following effect:

If the Legislature inadvertently omits the criminal norm, then the Legislature itself should correct the error. It should not be left to the court to speculate on what the Legislature wished to do and then be left to the court itself to create a criminal norm. In any event the principle quoted is formulated too broadly: ordinary legal norms can also be created by means of express prohibitions, and can be based "upon grounds of public policy", but this still does not transform such legal norms into criminal norms.

In Ackermann J's opinion, "there is merit in this criticism." For the purposes of this judgment, however, "I find it unnecessary to take this matter further for the following reason: even if one assumes that the principles laid down in Forlee are applicable in this Division, they are not applicable to the facts in the present case."

From the passage in Forlee quoted above, it appeared to Ackermann J that the consideration "that no law of this kind can be effective without a penalty" weighed heavily with the court. The position in the present case was completely different. The purpose of the regulation with which the court was here dealing was to maintain good order and discipline in the treatment centres concerned. There was no indication that this purpose could not be achieved in full by making use of the procedure set out in section 43(1) of the 1992 Act: that is, by the applicable centre's taking the necessary steps against the patient through an internal investigation, and imposing the punishment prescribed by regulation.

Accordingly, Ackermann J could not see that the public interest required the transgression to be treated as an offence which could be tried and punished in the ordinary courts of the country. Apart from this, the legislature had expressly omitted from the 1992 Act those provisions of the 1971 Act which dealt with the prosecution and punishment in a magistrate's court of an inmate of a rehabilitation centre who transgresses.

These considerations, taken cumulatively, led to the conclusion that the 1992 Act excluded the possibility of an inmate of a rehabilitation centre being criminally prosecuted in the ordinary courts of the country. The relevant section in the 1992 Act contained only a legal norm, not a criminal one. As Snyman wrote subsequently, "In enacting the 1992 Act, the Legislature in all probability intended non-compliance with the legal norm to lead only to certain administrative measures being taken by the superintendent of the institute, and not to a criminal charge against and a conviction of the transgressor of the norm."

The result of all this was that the accused Joseph Francis and Wally Singh should not have been charged or convicted in any magistrate's court of contravening Regulation 84(j). Accordingly, their convictions were set aside.

Farlam J concurred in the judgment of Ackermann J.

== Principle of legality ==
Snyman, much cited in Ackermann J's decision, subsequently noted of this decision that the court had "clearly recognised the importance of the principle of legality in criminal law." Although the court did not expressly refuse to follow the principle enunciated in Forlee's case, it was "nevertheless significant," thought Snyman, that the court was "quite sympathetic toward the criticism levelled at that case," including Snyman's own criticism.

== See also ==
- Criminal law in South Africa
- Legality
