= Nation state =

Political term for a state that is based around a nation

A nation state, or nation-state, is a political entity in which the state (a centralized political organization ruling over a population within a territory) and the nation (a community based on a common identity) are congruent.

A nation, sometimes used in the sense of a common ethnicity, may include a diaspora or refugees who live outside the nation-state; some dispersed nations (such as the Roma nation, for example) do not have a state where that ethnicity predominates. In a more general sense, a nation-state is simply a large, politically sovereign country or administrative territory.

Historians and scholars of nationalism studies are divided over whether nations long predated modern nation-states and the ideology of nationalism, or whether modern states and nationalism largely produced the nations we recognize today. However, they generally agree that the nineteenth century, following the age of revolutions, was a decisive period for the rise and consolidation of nation-states.

== Complexity ==
The relationship between a nation (in the ethnic sense) and a state can be complex. The presence of a state can encourage ethnogenesis, and a group with a pre-existing ethnic identity can influence the drawing of territorial boundaries or argue for political legitimacy. This definition of a "nation-state" is not universally accepted. "All attempts to develop terminological consensus around 'nation' failed", concludes academic Valery Tishkov. Walker Connor discusses the impressions surrounding the characters of "nation", "(sovereign) state", "nation-state", and "nationalism". Connor, who gave the term "ethnonationalism" wide currency, also discusses the tendency to confuse nation and state and the treatment of all states as if nation states.

A nation-state may or may not be contrasted with:

- An empire, a political unit made up of several territories and peoples, typically established through conquest and marked by a dominant center and subordinate peripheries.
- A multinational state, where no one ethnic or cultural group dominates (such a state may also be considered a multicultural state - depending on the degree of cultural assimilation of its various groups).
- A city-state, which is both smaller than a "nation" in the sense of a "large sovereign country" and which may or may not be dominated by all or part of a single "nation" in the sense of a common ethnicity or culture.
- A confederation, a league of sovereign states, which might or might not include nation-states.
- A federated state, which may or may not be a nation-state, and which is only partially self-governing within a larger federation (for example, the state boundaries of Bosnia and Herzegovina are drawn along ethnic lines, but those of the United States are not).

== History ==
=== Origins ===
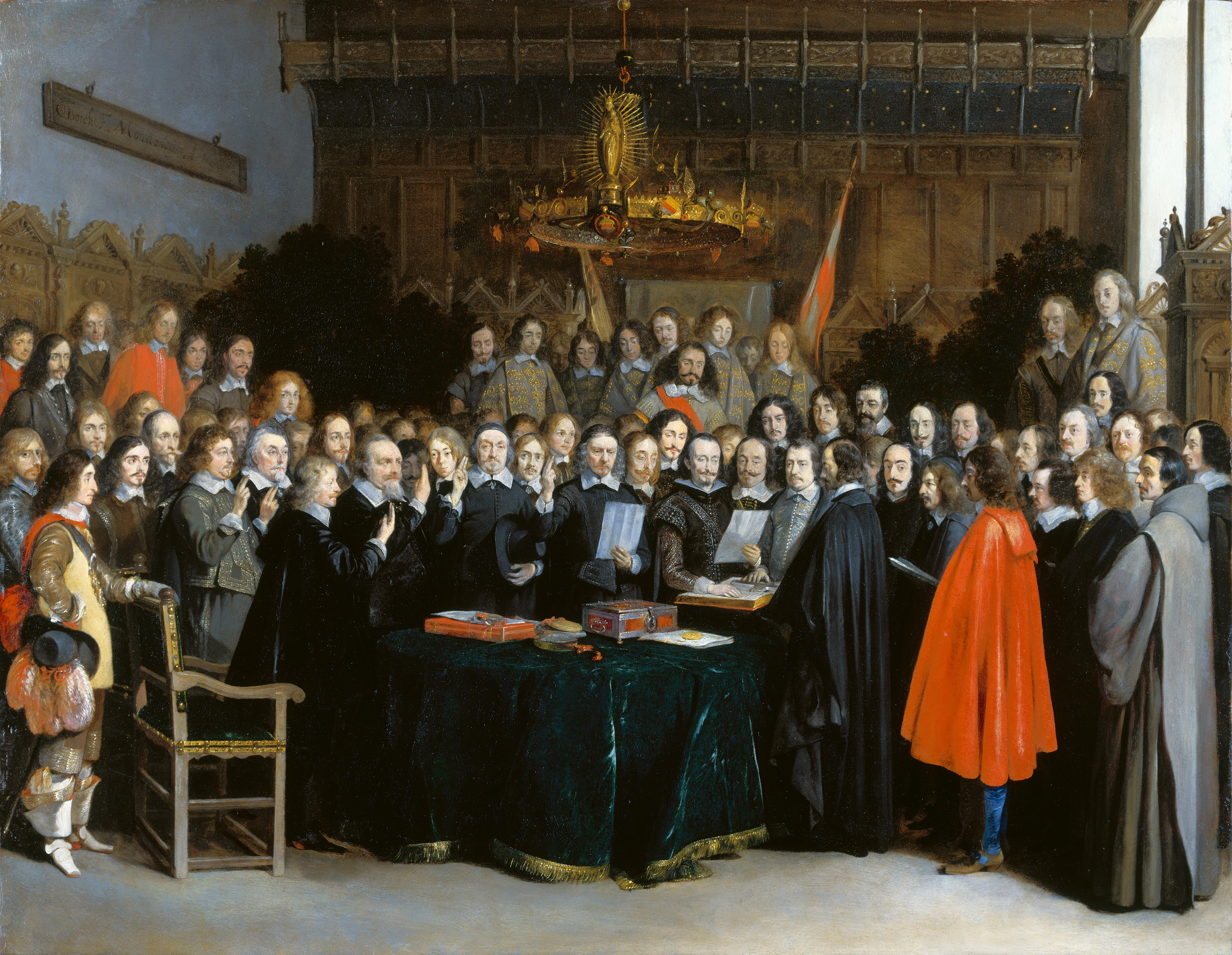
Painting of "The Ratification of the Treaty of Münster"; this and other negotiations resulted in the 1648 Peace of Westphalia

The origins and early history of nation-states are disputed. A major theoretical question is: "Which came first, the nation or the nation-state?" Scholars such as Steven Weber, David Woodward, Michel Foucault and Jeremy Black have advanced the hypothesis that the nation-state did not arise out of political ingenuity or an unknown undetermined source, nor was it a political invention; rather, it is an inadvertent by-product of 15th-century intellectual discoveries in political economy, capitalism, mercantilism, political geography, and geography combined with cartography and advances in map-making technologies. It was with these intellectual discoveries and technological advances that the nation-state arose.

For others (often known as "primordialists"), the nation existed first. Then nationalist movements arose for sovereignty, and the nation-state was created to meet that demand. Some "modernization theories" of nationalism see it as a product of government policies to unify and modernize an already existing state. Most theories see the nation-state as a 19th-century European phenomenon facilitated by developments such as state-mandated education, mass literacy, and mass media. However, historians also note the early emergence of a relatively unified state and identity in Portugal and the Dutch Republic, and some date the emergence of nations even earlier. Adrian Hastings, for instance, argued that Ancient Israel as depicted in the Hebrew Bible "gave the world the model of nationhood, and even nation-statehood"; however, after the fall of Jerusalem, the Jews lost this status for nearly two millennia, while still preserving their national identity until "the more inevitable rise of Zionism", in modern times, which sought to establish a nation-state.

Eric Hobsbawm argues that the establishment of a French nation was not the result of French nationalism, which would not emerge until the end of the 19th century, but rather the policies implemented by pre-existing French states. Many of these reforms were implemented since the French Revolution, at which time only half of the French people spoke some French – with only a quarter of those speaking the version of it found in literature and places of learning. As the number of Italian speakers in Italy was even lower at the time of Italian unification, similar arguments have been made regarding the modern Italian nation, with both the French and the Italian states promoting the replacement of various regional dialects and languages with standardized dialects. The introduction of conscription and the Third Republic's 1880s laws on public instruction facilitated the creation of a national identity under this theory.

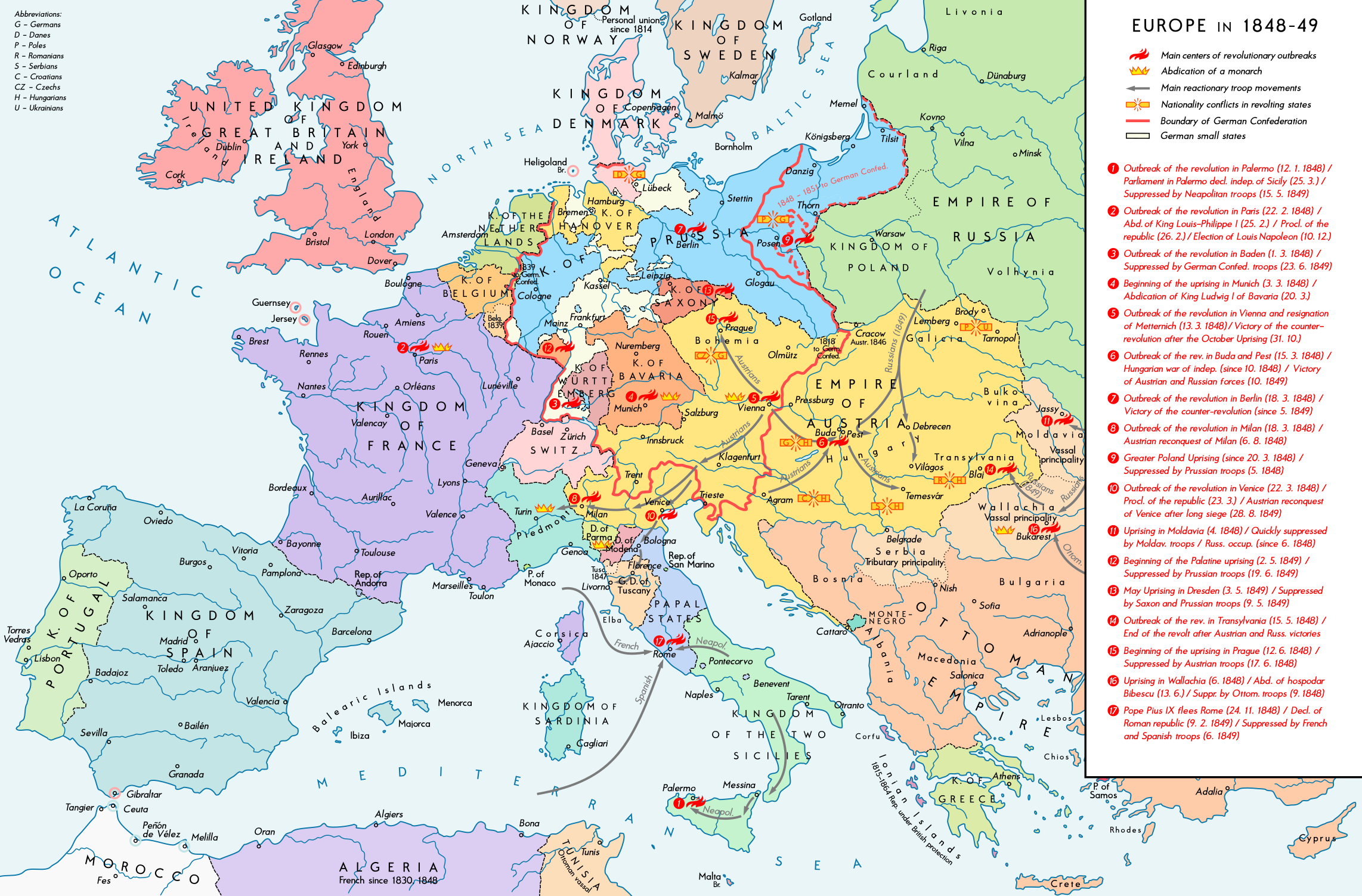
The Revolutions of 1848 were democratic and liberal, intending to remove the old monarchical structures and to create independent nation-states in Europe.

Some nation-states, such as Germany and Italy, came into existence at least partly as a result of political campaigns by nationalists during the 19th century. In both cases the territory was previously divided among other states, some very small. At first, the sense of common identity was a cultural movement, such as in the Völkisch movement in German-speaking states, which rapidly acquired a political significance. In these cases the nationalist sentiment and the nationalist movement precede the unification of the German and Italian nation-states.

Historians Hans Kohn, Liah Greenfeld, Philip White, and others have classified nations such as Germany or Italy, where they believe cultural unification preceded state unification, as ethnic nations or ethnic nationalities. However, "state-driven" national unifications, such as in France, England, or China, are more likely to flourish in multiethnic societies, producing a traditional national heritage of civic nations or territory-based nationalities.

The idea of a nation-state was and is associated with the rise of the modern system of states, often called the "Westphalian system", following the Treaty of Westphalia (1648). The balance of power, which characterized that system, depended for its effectiveness upon clearly defined, centrally controlled, independent entities, whether empires or nation states, which recognize each other's sovereignty and territory. The Westphalian system did not create the nation-state, but the nation-state meets the criteria for its component states (by assuming that there is no disputed territory). Before the Westphalian system, the closest geopolitical system was the "Chanyuan system" established in East Asia in 1005 through the Treaty of Chanyuan, which, like the Westphalian peace treaties, designated national borders between the independent regimes of China's Song dynasty and the semi-nomadic Liao dynasty. This system was copied and developed in East Asia in the following centuries until the establishment of the pan-Eurasian Mongol Empire in the 13th century.

The nation-state received a philosophical underpinning in the era of Romanticism, at first as the "natural" expression of the individual peoples (romantic nationalism: see Johann Gottlieb Fichte's conception of the Volk, later opposed by Ernest Renan). The increasing emphasis during the 19th century on the ethnic and racial origins of the nation led to a redefinition of the nation-state in these terms. Racism, which in Boulainvilliers's theories was inherently antipatriotic and antinationalist, joined itself with colonialist imperialism and "continental imperialism", most notably in pan-Germanic and pan-Slavic movements.

The relationship between racism and ethnic nationalism reached its height in the 20th century through fascism and Nazism. The specific combination of "nation" ("people") and "state" expressed in such terms as the völkischer Staat and implemented in laws such as the 1935 Nuremberg laws made fascist states such as early Nazi Germany qualitatively different from non-fascist nation-states. Minorities were not considered part of the people (Volk) and were consequently denied to have an authentic or legitimate role in such a state. In Germany, neither Jews nor the Roma were considered part of the people, and both were specifically targeted for persecution. German nationality law defined "German" based on German ancestry, excluding all non-Germans from the people.

In recent years, a nation-state's claim to absolute sovereignty within its borders has been criticized. A global political system based on international agreements and supra-national blocs characterized the post-war era. Non-state actors, such as international corporations and non-governmental organizations, are widely seen as eroding the economic and political power of nation-states.

According to Andreas Wimmer and Yuval Feinstein, nation-states tended to emerge when power shifts allowed nationalists to overthrow existing regimes or absorb existing administrative units. Xue Li and Alexander Hicks link the frequency of nation-state creation to processes of diffusion that emanate from international organizations.

=== Before the nation-state ===
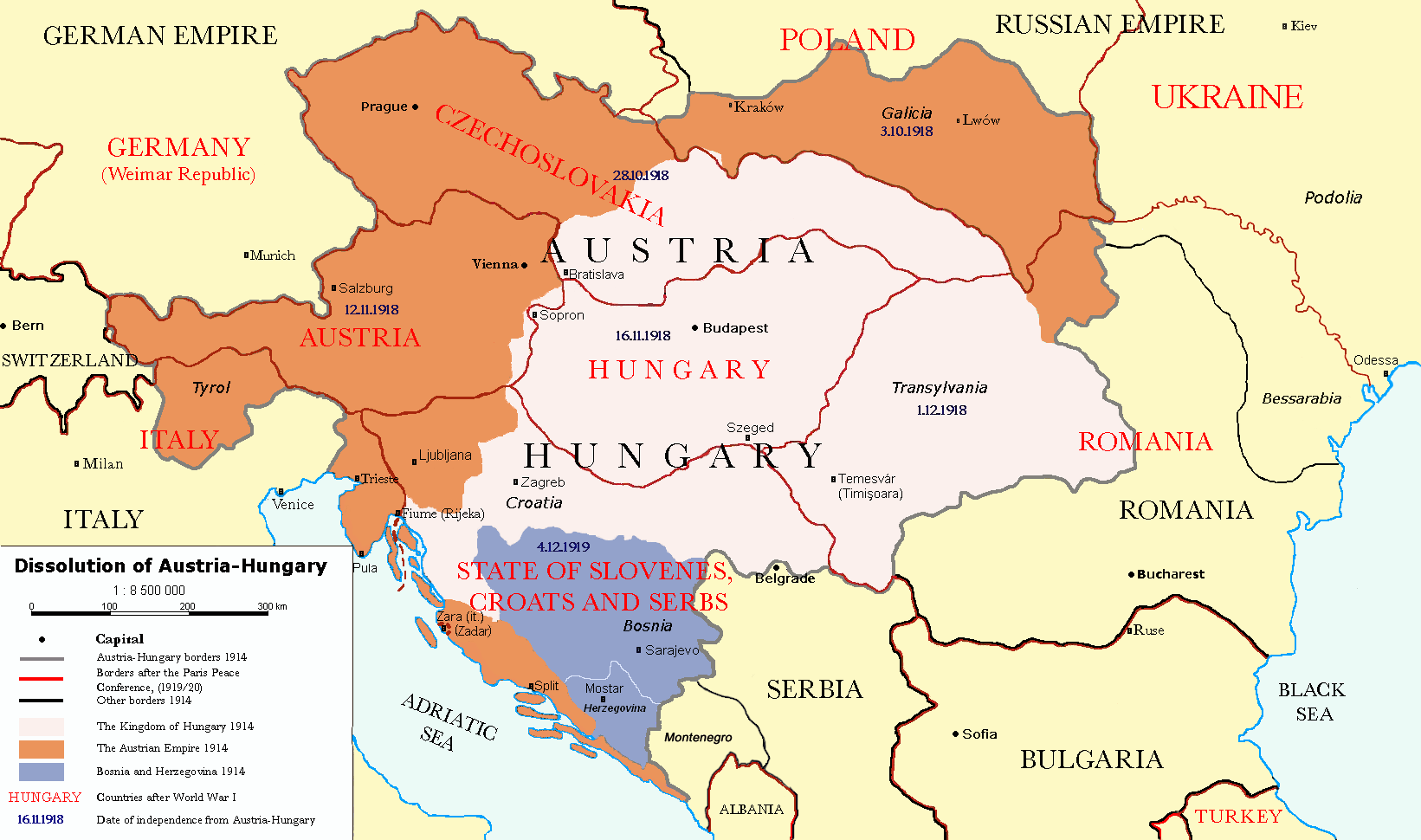
Dissolution of the multiethnic Austro-Hungarian Empire (1918)

In Europe, during the 18th century, the classic non-national states were the multiethnic empires, the Austrian Empire, the Kingdom of France (and its empire), the Kingdom of Hungary, the Russian Empire, the Portuguese Empire, the Spanish Empire, the Ottoman Empire, the British Empire, the Dutch Empire and smaller nations at what would now be called sub-state level. The multi-ethnic empire was a monarchy, usually absolute, ruled by a king, emperor or sultan. (Note: The Dutch Empire of the time was a monarchy in all but name, ruled (mostly) by a hereditary stadtholder.) The population belonged to many ethnic groups, and they spoke many languages. The empire was dominated by one ethnic group, and their language was usually the language of public administration. The ruling dynasty was usually, but not always, from that group.

This type of state is not specifically European: such empires existed in Asia, Africa and the Americas. Chinese dynasties, such as the Tang dynasty, the Yuan dynasty, and the Qing dynasty, were all multiethnic regimes governed by a ruling ethnic group. In the three examples, their ruling ethnic groups were the Han-Chinese, Mongols, and the Manchus. In the Muslim world, immediately after Muhammad died in 632, Caliphates were established. Caliphates were Islamic states under the leadership of a political-religious successor to the Islamic prophet Muhammad. These polities developed into multi-ethnic trans-national empires. The Ottoman sultan, Selim I (1512–1520) reclaimed the title of caliph, which had been in dispute and asserted by a diversity of rulers and "shadow caliphs" in the centuries of the Abbasid-Mamluk Caliphate since the Mongols' sacking of Baghdad and the killing of the last Abbasid Caliph in Baghdad, Iraq 1258. The Ottoman Caliphate as an office of the Ottoman Empire was abolished under Mustafa Kemal Atatürk in 1924 as part of Atatürk's Reforms.

The Holy Roman Empire was a limited elective monarchy composed of hundreds of state-like entities.

Some of the smaller European states were not so ethnically diverse but were also dynastic states ruled by a royal house. Their territory could expand by royal intermarriage or merge with another state when the dynasty merged. In some parts of Europe, notably Germany, minimal territorial units existed. They were recognized by their neighbours as independent and had their government and laws. Some were ruled by princes or other hereditary rulers; some were governed by bishops or abbots. Because they were so small, however, they had no separate language or culture: the inhabitants shared the language of the surrounding region.

In some cases, these states were overthrown by nationalist uprisings in the 19th century. Liberal ideas of free trade played a role in German unification, which was preceded by a customs union, the Zollverein. However, the Austro-Prussian War and the German alliances in the Franco-Prussian War were decisive in the unification. The Austro-Hungarian Empire and the Ottoman Empire broke up after the First World War, but the Russian Empire was replaced by the Soviet Union in most of its multinational territory after the Russian Civil War.

A few of the smaller states survived: the independent principalities of Liechtenstein, Andorra, Monaco, and the Republic of San Marino. (Vatican City is a special case. All of the larger Papal States save the Vatican itself were occupied and absorbed by Italy by 1870. The resulting Roman Question was resolved with the rise of the modern state under the 1929 Lateran treaties between Italy and the Holy See.)

== Characteristics ==
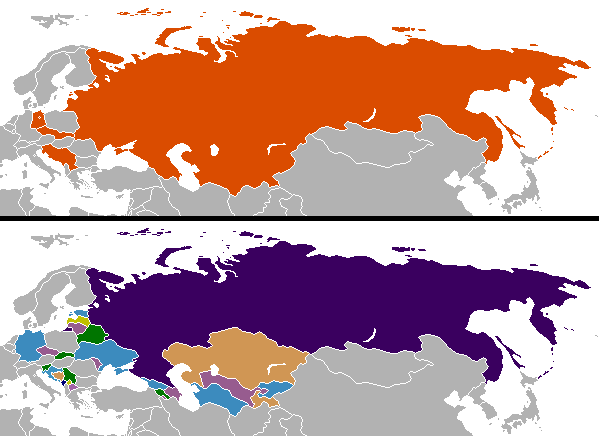
Changes in national boundaries after the dissolutions of the Soviet Union and Czechoslovakia, the breakup of Yugoslavia and the reunification of Germany

"Legitimate states that govern effectively and dynamic industrial economies are widely regarded today [2004] as the defining characteristics of a modern nation-state."

Nation-states have their characteristics differing from pre-national states. For a start, they have a different attitude to their territory compared to dynastic monarchies: it is semisacred and nontransferable. No nation would swap territory with other states simply, for example, because the king's daughter married. They have a different type of border, in principle, defined only by the national group's settlement area. However, many nation-states also sought natural borders (rivers, mountain ranges). They are constantly changing in population size and power because of the limited restrictions of their borders.

The most noticeable characteristic is the degree to which nation-states use the state as an instrument of national unity in economic, social and cultural life.

The nation-state promoted economic unity by abolishing internal customs and tolls. In Germany, that process, the creation of the Zollverein, preceded formal national unity. Nation states typically have a policy to create and maintain national transportation infrastructure, facilitating trade and travel. In 19th-century Europe, the expansion of the rail transport networks was at first largely a matter for private railway companies but gradually came under the control of the national governments. The French rail network, with its main lines radiating from Paris to all corners of France, is often seen as a reflection of the centralised French nation-state, which directed its construction. Nation states continue to build, for instance, specifically national motorway networks. Specifically, transnational infrastructure programmes, such as the Trans-European Networks, are a recent innovation.

The nation-states typically had a more centralised and uniform public administration than their imperial predecessors: they were smaller, and the population was less diverse. (The internal diversity of the Ottoman Empire, for instance, was very great.) After the 19th-century triumph of the nation-state in Europe, regional identity was subordinate to national identity in regions such as Alsace-Lorraine, Catalonia, Brittany and Corsica. In many cases, the regional administration was also subordinated to the central (national) government. This process was partially reversed from the 1970s onward, with the introduction of various forms of regional autonomy, in formerly centralised states such as Spain or Italy.

The most apparent impact of the nation-state, as compared to its non-national predecessors, is creating a uniform national culture through state policy. The model of the nation-state implies that its population constitutes a nation, united by a common descent, a common language and many forms of shared culture. When implied unity was absent, the nation-state often tried to create it. It promoted a uniform national language through language policy. The creation of national systems of compulsory primary education and a relatively uniform curriculum in secondary schools was the most effective instrument in the spread of the national languages. The schools also taught national history, often in a propagandistic and mythologised version, and (especially during conflicts) some nation-states still teach this kind of history.

Language and cultural policy was sometimes hostile, aimed at suppressing non-national elements. Language prohibitions were sometimes used to accelerate the adoption of national languages and the decline of minority languages (see examples: Anglicisation, Bulgarization, Croatization, Czechization, Dutchification, Francisation, Germanisation, Hellenization, Hispanicization, Italianization, Lithuanization, Magyarisation, Polonisation, Russification, Serbization, Slovakisation, Swedification, Turkification).

In some cases, these policies triggered bitter conflicts and further ethnic separatism. But where it worked, the cultural uniformity and homogeneity of the population increased. Conversely, the cultural divergence at the border became sharper: in theory, a uniform French identity extends from the Atlantic coast to the Rhine, and on the other bank of the Rhine, a uniform German identity begins. Both sides have divergent language policy and educational systems to enforce that model.

== In practice ==
Map of territorial changes in Europe after World War I (as of 1923)

The notion of a unifying "national identity" also extends to countries that host multiple ethnic or language groups, such as India. For example, Switzerland is constitutionally a confederation of cantons and has four official languages. Still, it also has a "Swiss" national identity, a national history and a classic national hero, Wilhelm Tell.

Innumerable conflicts have arisen where political boundaries did not correspond with ethnic or cultural boundaries.

After World War II in the Josip Broz Tito era, nationalism was appealed to for uniting South Slav peoples. Later in the 20th century, after the break-up of the Soviet Union, leaders appealed to ancient ethnic feuds or tensions that ignited conflict between the Serbs, Croats, and Slovenes, as well as Bosniaks, Montenegrins and Macedonians, eventually breaking up the long collaboration of peoples. Ethnic cleansing was carried out in the Balkans, destroying the formerly socialist republic and producing the civil wars in Croatia and Bosnia and Herzegovina in 1992–95, resulting in mass population displacements and segregation that radically altered what was once a highly diverse and intermixed ethnic makeup of the region. These conflicts were mainly about creating a new political framework of states, each of which would be ethnically and politically homogeneous. Serbs, Croats and Bosniaks insisted they were ethnically distinct, although many communities had a long history of intermarriage.

Belgium is a classic example of a state that is not a nation-state. The state was formed by secession from the United Kingdom of the Netherlands in 1830, whose neutrality and integrity was protected by the Treaty of London 1839; thus, it served as a buffer state after the Napoleonic Wars between the European powers France, Prussia (after 1871 the German Empire) and the United Kingdom until World War I, when the Germans breached its neutrality. Currently, Belgium is divided between the Flemings in the north, the French-speaking population in the south, and the German-speaking population in the east. The Flemish population in the north speaks Dutch, the Walloon population in the south speaks either French or, in the east of Liège Province, German. The Brussels population speaks French or Dutch.

The Flemish identity is also cultural, and there is a strong separatist movement espoused by the political parties, the right-wing Vlaams Belang and the New Flemish Alliance. The Francophone Walloon identity of Belgium is linguistically distinct and regionalist. There is also unitary Belgian nationalism, several versions of a Greater Netherlands ideal, and a German-speaking community of Belgium annexed from Germany in 1920 and re-annexed by Germany in 1940–1944. However, unlike Flemish Nationalism and Walloon Regionalism, the Greater Netherlands ideal is electorally marginal and does not form a part of any political party represented in the Chamber of Representatives official platform.

Ethnolinguistic map of mainland China and Taiwan

China covers a large geographic area and uses the concept of "Zhonghua minzu" or Chinese nationality, in the sense of ethnic groups. Still, it also officially recognizes the majority Han ethnic group which accounts for over 90% of the population, and no fewer than 55 ethnic national minorities.

According to Philip G. Roeder, Moldova is an example of a Soviet-era "segment-state" (Moldavian SSR), where the "nation-state project of the segment-state trumped the nation-state project of prior statehood. In Moldova, despite strong agitation from university faculty and students for reunification with Romania, the nation-state project forged within the Moldavian SSR trumped the project for a return to the interwar nation-state project of Greater Romania." See Controversy over linguistic and ethnic identity in Moldova for further details.

== Specific cases ==
=== Israel ===
Established in May 1948 as a homeland for the Jewish people, the State of Israel's Basic Laws defines itself as a center of Jewish cultural and national identity, while maintaining citizenship and legal rights for people of all religious and ethnic backgrounds. The Basic Law: Israel as the Nation-State of the Jewish People (2018) explicitly specifies the nature of the State of Israel as the nation-state of the Jewish people. According to the Israel Central Bureau of Statistics, 75.7% of Israel's population are Jews. Arabs, who make up 20.4% of the population, are the largest ethnic minority in Israel. Israel also has very small communities of Armenians, Circassians, Assyrians, Samaritans. There are also some non-Jewish spouses of Israeli Jews. However, these communities are very small, and usually number only in the hundreds or thousands.

=== Kingdom of the Netherlands ===
The Kingdom of the Netherlands presents an unusual example in which one kingdom represents four distinct countries. The four countries of the Kingdom of the Netherlands are:

- Netherlands (including the provinces in continental Europe and the special municipalities of Bonaire, Sint Eustatius and Saba)
- Aruba
- Curaçao
- Sint Maarten

Each is expressly designated as a land in Dutch law by the Charter for the Kingdom of the Netherlands. Unlike the German Länder and the Austrian Bundesländer, landen is consistently translated as "countries" by the Dutch government.

=== Spain ===
Iberian monarchies and kingdoms in 1400

While historical monarchies often brought together different kingdoms/territories/ethnic groups under the same crown, in modern nation states political elites seek a uniformity of the population, leading to state nationalism. In the case of the Christian territories of the future Spain, neighboring Al-Andalus, there was an early perception of ethnicity, faith and shared territory in the Middle Ages (13th–14th centuries), as documented by the Chronicle of Muntaner in the proposal of the Castilian king to the other Christian kings of the peninsula: "if these four Kings of Spain whom he named, who are of one flesh and blood, held together, little need they fear all the other powers of the world". After the dynastic union of the Catholic Monarchs in the 15th century, the Spanish Monarchy ruled over different kingdoms, each with its own cultural, linguistic and political particularities, and the kings had to swear by the Laws of each territory before the respective Parliaments. Forming the Spanish Empire, at this time the Hispanic Monarchy had its maximum territorial expansion.

After the War of the Spanish Succession, rooted in the political position of the Count-Duke of Olivares and the absolutism of Philip V, the assimilation of the Crown of Aragon by the Castilian Crown through the Decrees of Nueva Planta was the first step in the creation of the Spanish nation-state. As in other contemporary European states, political union was the first step in the creation of the Spanish nation-state, in this case not on a uniform ethnic basis, but through the imposition of the political and cultural characteristics of the dominant ethnic group, in this case the Castilians, over those of other ethnic groups, who became national minorities to be assimilated. In fact, since the political unification of 1714, Spanish assimilation policies towards Catalan-speaking territories (Catalonia, Valencia, the Balearic Islands, part of Aragon) and other national minorities, as Basques and Galicians, have been a historical constant.

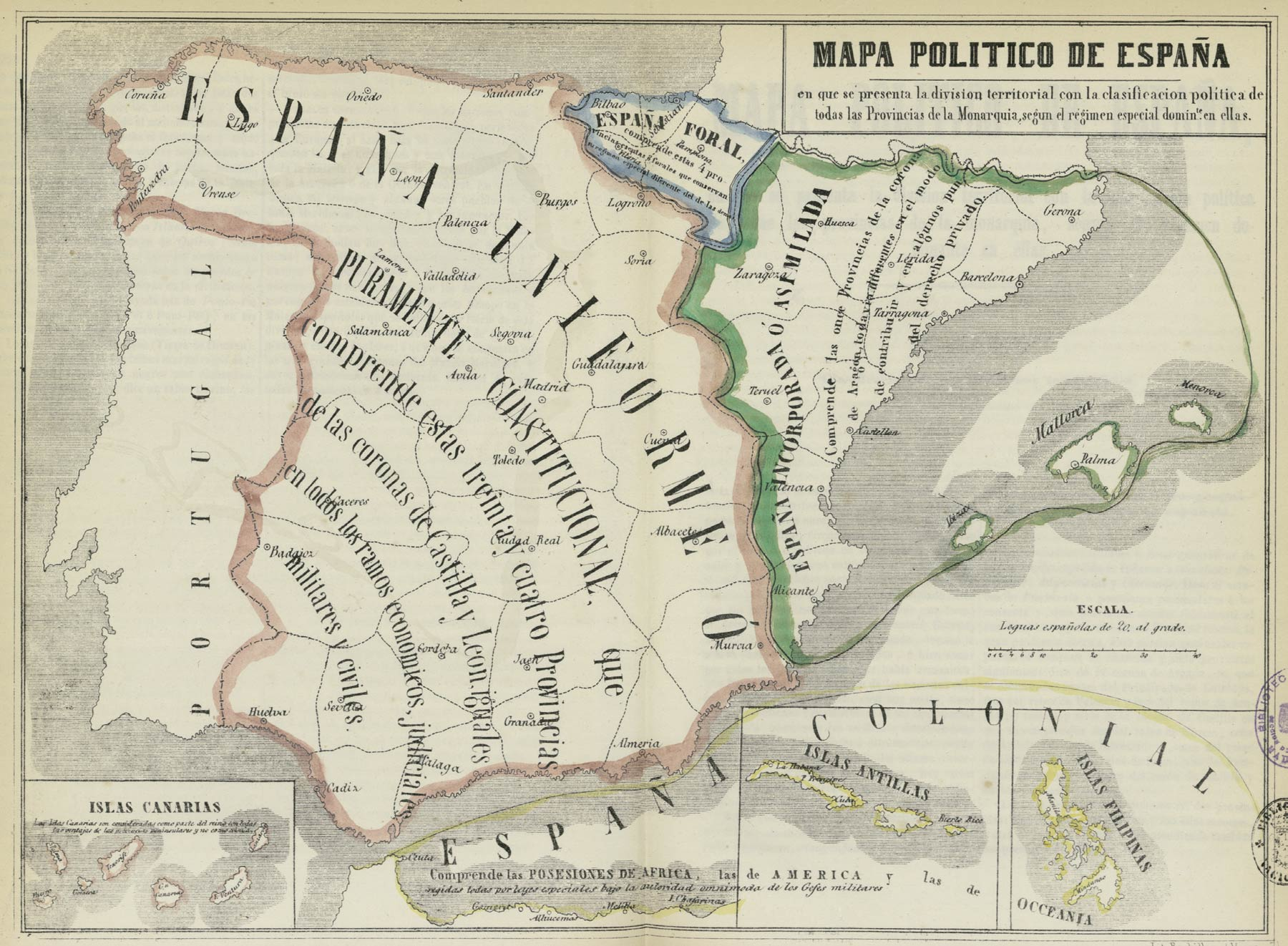
School map of Spain from 1850. On it, the State is divided into four parts: – "Fully constitutional Spain", which includes Castile and the Galician-speaking territories. – "Annexed or assimilated Spain": the territories of the Crown of Aragon, the more significant part of which, except Aragon proper, are Catalan-speaking-, "Foral Spain", which includes Basque-speaking territories, – and "Colonial Spain", with the last overseas colonial territories.

The process of assimilation began with secret instructions to the corregidores of the Catalan territory: they "will take the utmost care to introduce the Castilian language, for which purpose he will give the most temperate and disguised measures so that the effect is achieved, without the care being noticed." From there, actions in the service of assimilation, discreet or aggressive, were continued, and reached to the last detail, such as, in 1799, the Royal Certificate forbidding anyone to "represent, sing and dance pieces that were not in Spanish." These nationalist policies, sometimes very aggressive, and still in force, have been, and still are, the seed of repeated territorial conflicts within the State.

Although official Spanish history describes a "natural" decline of the Catalan language and increasing replacement by Spanish between the 16th and 19th centuries, especially among the upper classes, a survey of language usage in 1807, commissioned by Napoleon, indicates that except in the royal courts, Spanish is absent from everyday life. It is indicated that Catalan "is taught in schools, printed and spoken, not only among the lower class, but also among people of first quality, also in social gatherings, as in visits and congresses", indicating that it is spoken everywhere "except in the royal courts". He also indicates that Catalan is also spoken "in the Kingdom of Valencia, in the islands of Mallorca, Menorca, Ibiza, Sardinia, Corsica and much of Sicily, in the Vall of Aran and Cerdaña".

The nationalization process accelerated in the 19th century, in parallel to the origin of Spanish nationalism, the social, political and ideological movement that tried to shape a Spanish national identity based on the Castilian model, in conflict with the other historical nations of the State. Politicians of the time were aware that despite the aggressive policies pursued up to that time, the uniform and monocultural "Spanish nation" did not exist, as indicated in 1835 by Antonio Alcalà Galiano, when in the Cortes del Estatuto Real he defended the effort

"To make the Spanish nation a nation that neither is nor has been until now."

In 1906, the Catalanist party Solidaritat Catalana was founded to try to mitigate the economically and culturally oppressive treatment of Spain towards the Catalans. One of the responses of Spanish nationalism came from the military state with statements such as that of the publication La Correspondencia militar: "The Catalan problem is not solved, well, by freedom, but by restriction; not by palliatives and pacts, but by iron and fire". Another came from important Spanish intellectuals, such as Pio Baroja and Blasco Ibáñez, calling the Catalans "Jews", considered a serious insult at that time when racism was gaining strength. Building the nation (as in France, it was the state that created the nation, and not the opposite process) is an ideal that the Spanish elites constantly reiterated, and, one hundred years later than Alcalá Galiano, for example, we can also find it in the mouth of the fascist José Pemartín, who admired the German and Italian modeling policies:

"There is an intimate and decisive dualism, both in Italian fascism and in German National Socialism. On the one hand, the Hegelian doctrine of the absolutism of the state is felt. The State originates in the Nation, educates and shapes the mentality of the individual; is, in Mussolini's words, the soul of the soul»

And will be found again two hundred years later, from the socialist Josep Borrell:

The modern history of Spain is an unfortunate history that meant that we did not consolidate a modern State. Independenceists think that the nation makes the State. I think the opposite. The State makes the nation. A strong State, which imposes its language, culture, education.

The turn of the 20th century, and the first half of that century, have seen the most ethnic violence, coinciding with a racism that even came to identify states with races; in the case of Spain, with a supposed Spanish race sublimated in Castilian, of which national minorities were degenerate forms, and the first of those that needed to be exterminated. There were even public proposals for the repression of whole Catalonia, and even the extermination of Catalans, such as that of Juan Pujol, Head of Press and Propaganda of the Junta de Defensa Nacional during the Spanish Civil War, in La Voz de España, or that of Queipo de Llano, in a radio address in 1936, among others.

The influence of Spanish nationalism could be found in a pogrom in Argentina, during the Tragic Week, in 1919. It was called to attack Jews and Catalans indiscriminately, possibly because the influence of Spanish nationalism, which at the time described Catalans as a Semitic ethnicity.

Also, one can find discourses on the alienation of Catalan speakers, such as, for example, an article entitled «Cataluña bilingüe», by Menéndez Pidal, in which he defends the Romanones decree against the Catalan language, published in El Imparcial, on 15 December 1902:

«... There they will see that the Courts of the Catalan-Aragonese Confederation never had Catalan as their official language; that the kings of Aragon, even those of the Catalan dynasty, used Catalan only in Catalonia, and used Spanish not only in the Cortes of Aragon, but also in foreign relations, the same with Castile or Navarre as with the infidel kings of Granada, from Africa or Asia, because even in the most important days of Catalonia, Spanish prevailed as the language of the Aragonese kingdom and Catalan was reserved for the peculiar affairs of the Catalan county..."

or the article "Los Catalanes. A las Cortes Constituyentes », appeared in several newspapers, among others: El Dia de Alicante, June 23, 1931, El Porvenir Castellano and El Noticiero de Soria, July 2, 1931, in the Heraldo de Almeria on June 4, 1931, sent by the "Pro-Justice Committee", with a post office box in Madrid:

"The Catalanists have recently declared that they are not Spanish, nor do they want to be, nor can they be. They have also been saying for a long time that they are an oppressed, enslaved, exploited people. It is imperative to do them justice... That they return to Phenicia or that they go wherever they want to admit them. When the Catalan tribes saw Spain and settled in the Spanish territory that is now occupied by the provinces of Barcelona, Gerona, Lérida and Tarragona, how little they imagined that the case of the captivity of the tribes of Israel in Egypt would be repeated there! !... Let us respect his most holy will. They are eternally inadaptable... Their cowardice and selfishness leaves them no room for fraternity... So, we propose to the Constituent Cortes the expulsion of the Catalanists... You are free! The Republic opens wide the doors of Spain, your prison. go away Get out of here. Go back to Phenicia, or go wherever you want, how big is the world."

The main scapegoat of Spanish nationalism is the non-Spanish languages, which over the last three hundred years have been tried to be replaced by Spanish with hundreds of laws and regulations, but also with acts of great violence, such as during the civil war. For example, the statements of Queipo de Llano can be found in the article entitled "Against Catalonia, the Israel of the Modern World", published in the Diario Palentino on November 26, 1936, where it is dropped that in America Catalans are considered a race of Jews, because they use the same procedures that the Hebrews perform in all the nations of the Globe. And considering the Catalans as Hebrews and considering his anti-Semitism "Our struggle is not a civil war, but a war for Western civilization against the Jewish world," it is not surprising that Queipo de Llano expressed his anti-Catalan intentions: "When the war is over, Pompeu Fabra and his works will be dragged along the Ramblas" (it was not talk to talk, the house of Pompeu Fabra, the standardizer of Catalan language, was raided and his huge personal library burned in the middle of the street. Pompeu Fabra was able to escape into exile). Another example of fascist aggression towards the Catalan language is pointed out by Paul Preston in "The Spanish Holocaust", given that during the civil war it practically led to an ethnic conflict:

"In the days following the occupation of Lleida (...), the republican prisoners identified as Catalans were executed without trial. Anyone who heard them speak Catalan was very likely to be arrested. The arbitrary brutality of the anti-Catalan repression reached such a point that Franco himself had to issue an order ordering that mistakes that could later be regretted be avoided ". "There are examples of the murder of peasants for no other apparent reason than that of speaking Catalan"

After a possible attempt at ethnic cleansing, the biopolitical imposition of Spanish during the Franco dictatorship, to the point of being considered an attempt at cultural genocide, democracy consolidated an apparent asymmetric regime of bilingualism of sorts, wherein the Spanish government has employed a system of laws that favored Spanish over Catalan, which becomes the weaker of the two languages, and therefore, in the absence of other states where it is spoken, is doomed to extinction in the medium or short term. In the same vein, its use in the Spanish Congress is prevented, and it is prevented from achieving official status Europe, unlike less spoken languages such as Gaelic. In other institutional areas, such as justice, Plataforma per la Llengua has denounced Catalanophobia. The association Soberania i Justícia have also denounced it in an act in the European Parliament. It also takes the form of linguistic secessionism, originally advocated by the Spanish extreme right and which has finally been adopted by the Spanish government itself and state bodies.

In November 2005, Omnium Cultural organized a meeting of Catalan and Madrid intellectuals in the Círculo de bellas artes in Madrid to show support for ongoing reform of Catalan Statute of Autonomy, which sought to resolve territorial tensions, and among other things better protect the Catalan language. On the Catalan side, a flight was made with one hundred representatives of the cultural, civic, intellectual, artistic and sporting world of Catalonia, but on the Spanish side, except Santiago Carrillo, a politician from the Second Republic, did not attend any more. The subsequent failure of the statutory reform with respect to its objectives opened the door to the growth of Catalan sovereignty.

Apart from language discrimination by public officials, e.g. in the hospitals, the prohibition until September 2023 (47 years after Franco's death) of using the Catalan language in state institutions such as Court, despite being the former Crown of Aragon, with three Catalan-speaking territories, one of the co-founders of the current Spanish state, is nothing more than the continuation of the foreignization of Catalan-speaking people from the first third of the 20th century, in full swing of state racism and fascism. It also can be pointed the linguistic secessionism, originally advocated by the Spanish far right and which has finally been adopted by the Spanish government itself and state bodies. By fragmenting Catalan language into as many languages as territories, it becomes inoperative, economically suffocated, and becomes a political toy in the hands of territorial politicians.

Susceptible to be classified as an ethnic democracy, the Spanish State currently only recognizes the Romani as a national minority, excluding Catalans (and, of course, Valencians and Balearic), Basques and Galicians. However, it is evident to any external observer that there are social diversities within the Spanish State that qualify as manifestations of national minorities, such as, for example, the existence of the main three linguistic minorities in their ancestral territories.

=== United Kingdom ===
Home Nations of the United Kingdom

The United Kingdom is an unusual example of a nation state due to its "countries within a country". The United Kingdom is formed by the union of England, Scotland, Wales and Northern Ireland, but it is a unitary state formed initially by the merger of two independent kingdoms, the Kingdom of England (which already included Wales) and the Kingdom of Scotland, but the Treaty of Union (1707) that set out the agreed terms has ensured the continuation of distinct features of each state, including separate legal systems and separate national churches.

In 2003, the British Government described the United Kingdom as "countries within a country". While the Office for National Statistics and others describe the United Kingdom as a "nation state", others, including a then Prime Minister, describe it as a "multinational state", and the term Home Nations is used to describe the four national teams that represent the four nations of the United Kingdom (England, Northern Ireland, Scotland, Wales). Some refer to it as a "Union State".

== Minorities ==
The most obvious deviation from the ideal of "one nation, one state" is the presence of minorities, especially ethnic minorities, which are clearly not members of the majority nation. An ethnic nationalist definition of a nation is necessarily exclusive: ethnic nations typically do not have open membership. In most cases, there is a clear idea that surrounding nations are different, and that includes members of those nations who live on the "wrong side" of the border. Historical examples of groups who have been specifically singled out as outsiders are the Roma and Jews in Europe.

Negative responses to minorities within the nation state have ranged from cultural assimilation enforced by the state, to expulsion, persecution, violence, and extermination. The assimilation policies are usually enforced by the state, but violence against minorities is not always state-initiated: it can occur in the form of mob violence such as lynching or pogroms. Nation states are responsible for some of the worst historical examples of violence against minorities not considered part of the nation.

However, many nation states accept specific minorities as being part of the nation, and the term national minority is often used in this sense. The Sorbs in Germany are an example: for centuries they have lived in German-speaking states, surrounded by a much larger ethnic German population, and they have no other historical territory. They are now generally considered to be part of the German nation and are accepted as such by the Federal Republic of Germany, which constitutionally guarantees their cultural rights. Of the thousands of ethnic and cultural minorities in nation states across the world, only a few have this level of acceptance and protection.

Multiculturalism is an official policy in some states, establishing the ideal of coexisting existence among multiple and separate ethnic, cultural, and linguistic groups. Other states prefer the interculturalism (or "melting pot" approach) alternative to multiculturalism, citing problems with latter as promoting self-segregation tendencies among minority groups, challenging national cohesion, polarizing society in groups that can't relate to one another, generating problems in regard to minorities and immigrants' fluency in the national language of use and integration with the rest of society (generating hate and persecution against them from the "otherness" they would generate in such a case according to its adherents), without minorities having to give up certain parts of their culture before being absorbed into a now changed majority culture by their contribution. Many nations have laws protecting minority rights.

When national boundaries that do not match ethnic boundaries are drawn, such as in the Balkans and Central Asia, ethnic tension, massacres and even genocide, sometimes has occurred historically (see Bosnian genocide and 2010 South Kyrgyzstan ethnic clashes).

== Irredentism ==
The Greater German Reich under Nazi Germany in 1943

In principle, the border of a nation state would extend far enough to include all the members of the nation, and all of the national homeland. Again, in practice, some of them always live on the 'wrong side' of the border. Part of the national homeland may be there too, and it may be governed by the 'wrong' nation. The response to the non-inclusion of territory and population may take the form of irredentism: demands to annex unredeemed territory and incorporate it into the nation state.

Irredentist claims are usually based on the fact that an identifiable part of the national group lives across the border. However, they can include claims to territory where no members of that nation live at present, because they lived there in the past, the national language is spoken in that region, the national culture has influenced it, geographical unity with the existing territory, or a wide variety of other reasons. Past grievances are usually involved and can cause revanchism.

It is sometimes difficult to distinguish irredentism from pan-nationalism, since both claim that all members of an ethnic and cultural nation belong in one specific state. Pan-nationalism is less likely to specify the nation ethnically. For instance, variants of Pan-Germanism have different ideas about what constituted Greater Germany, including the confusing term Grossdeutschland, which, in fact, implied the inclusion of huge Slavic minorities from the Austro-Hungarian Empire.

Typically, irredentist demands are at first made by members of non-state nationalist movements. When they are adopted by a state, they typically result in tensions, and actual attempts at annexation are always considered a casus belli, a cause for war. In many cases, such claims result in long-term hostile relations between neighbouring states. Irredentist movements typically circulate maps of the claimed national territory, the greater nation state. That territory, which is often much larger than the existing state, plays a central role in their propaganda.

Irredentism should not be confused with claims to overseas colonies, which are not generally considered part of the national homeland. Some French overseas colonies would be an exception: French rule in Algeria unsuccessfully treated the colony as a département of France.

== Future ==
It has been speculated by both proponents of globalization and various science fiction writers that the concept of a nation state may disappear with the ever-increasing interconnectedness of the world. Such ideas are sometimes expressed around concepts of a world government. Another possibility is a move into communal anarchy or zero world government, in which nation states no longer exist.

=== Clash of civilizations ===
The theory of the clash of civilizations lies in direct contrast to cosmopolitan theories about an ever more connected world that no longer requires nation states. According to political scientist Samuel P. Huntington, people's cultural and religious identities will be the primary source of conflict in the post–Cold War world.

The theory was originally formulated in a 1992 lecture at the American Enterprise Institute, which was then developed in a 1993 Foreign Affairs article titled "The Clash of Civilizations?", in response to Francis Fukuyama's 1992 book, The End of History and the Last Man. Huntington later expanded his thesis in a 1996 book The Clash of Civilizations and the Remaking of World Order.

Huntington began his thinking by surveying the diverse theories about the nature of global politics in the post–Cold War period. Some theorists and writers argued that human rights, liberal democracy and capitalist free market economics had become the only remaining ideological alternative for nations in the post–Cold War world. Specifically, Francis Fukuyama, in The End of History and the Last Man, argued that the world had reached a Hegelian "end of history".

Huntington believed that while the age of ideology had ended, the world had reverted only to a normal state of affairs characterized by cultural conflict. In his thesis, he argued that the primary axis of conflict in the future will be along cultural and religious lines.

As an extension, he posits that the concept of different civilizations, as the highest rank of cultural identity, will become increasingly useful in analyzing the potential for conflict.

In the 1993 Foreign Affairs article, Huntington writes:

It is my hypothesis that the fundamental source of conflict in this new world will not be primarily ideological or primarily economic. The great divisions among humankind and the dominating source of conflict will be cultural. Nation states will remain the most powerful actors in world affairs, but the principal conflicts of global politics will occur between nations and groups of different civilizations. The clash of civilizations will dominate global politics. The fault lines between civilizations will be the battle lines of the future.

Sandra Joireman suggests that Huntington may be characterised as a neo-primordialist, as, while he sees people as strongly tied to their ethnicity, he does not believe that these ties have always existed.

== Historiography ==
Historians often look to the past to find the origins of a particular nation state. Indeed, they often put so much emphasis on the importance of the nation state in modern times, that they distort the history of earlier periods in order to emphasize the question of origins. Lansing and English argue that much of the medieval history of Europe was structured to follow the historical winners—especially the nation states that emerged around Paris and London. Important developments that did not directly lead to a nation state get neglected, they argue:

one effect of this approach has been to privilege historical winners, aspects of medieval Europe that became important in later centuries, above all the nation state.... Arguably the liveliest cultural innovation in the 13th century was the Mediterranean, centered on Frederick II's polyglot court and administration in Palermo...Sicily and the Italian South in later centuries suffered a long slide into overtaxed poverty and marginality. Textbook narratives, therefore, focus not on medieval Palermo, with its Muslim and Jewish bureaucracies and Arabic-speaking monarch, but on the historical winners, Paris and London.

== See also ==
- Balkanization
- Caliphate
- City-state
- Civilization state
- Ethnocracy
- Islamic state
- Monoethnicity
- Nation
- Nationalism
- National personification
- State nationalism
- Titular nation
- Westphalian sovereignty
