= R v Forlee =

In R v Forlee, the accused was charged with contravening a statutory provision that forbade the purchase of opium. The prohibition was taken over from an earlier Act, in which the purchase of opium was expressly declared a crime. In the new Act, which replaced the previous one, the criminal sanction (the provisions declaring the purchase to be a crime) was omitted. The court remarked as follows:

If this omission were intentional, then the Legislature considered either that the common law provided a penalty or that no penalty should be imposed at all. The latter conclusion is negatived by the whole tenor of those statutes [... T]he reasonable assumption is that the Legislature, whilst intending the prohibition to be absolute and effective, overlooked the absence of any expressed penalty [...]. It is clear that no law of this kind can be effective without a penalty; and the argument that the Courts must therefore be held to have the power to inflict a penalty, wherever the Legislature has intended to create an offence, is of considerable weight.

The court concluded: "We have come to the conclusion that the same principle applies in Roman-Dutch law, and that as the act in question was expressly an offence, it is punishable under our law." The court relied among other things on a rule which it formulated as follows: "The doing of an act which is expressly forbidden by the Legislature upon grounds of public policy constitutes an indictable offence, even though no penalty be attached."

The principle laid down in Forlee was followed in the Appellate Division in R v Langley and R v Baraitser, but was strongly criticised by academics including De Wet and Swanepoel, and Rabie and Strauss. In the view of CR Snyman,

If the Legislature inadvertently omits the criminal norm, then the Legislature itself should correct the error. It should not be left to the court to speculate on what the Legislature wished to do and then be left to the court itself to create a criminal norm. In any event the principle quoted is formulated too broadly: ordinary legal norms can also be created by means of express prohibitions, and can be based "upon grounds of public policy", but this still does not transform such legal norms into criminal norms.

In Ackermann J's opinion, in the later case of S v Francis, "there is merit in this criticism." For the purposes of that judgment, however, "I find it unnecessary to take this matter further for the following reason: even if one assumes that the principles laid down in Forlee are applicable in this Division, they are not applicable to the facts in the present case."

== See also ==
- South African criminal law
