= Law of Timor-Leste =

The law of Timor-Leste is based on the laws of Indonesia that was applied de facto as of October 25, 1999, as was determined by the United Nations; however, legislation passed by the Timor-Leste parliament supersedes Indonesian law. While laws were originally published only in English, the government began enacting law solely in Portuguese in 2002. For this reason, East Timorese laws are now written in English, Portuguese, and Indonesian. The law of Timor-Leste is enforced by the National Police, established in 2002. One of the most important events in the history of the law of Timor-Leste was the creation of the Special Panels of the Dili District Court, which attempted to deal with crimes such as murder, rape, and torture which took place in 1999. The panels sat from 2000 to 2006.

== See also ==
- East Timor Law Journal
