= Law of Namibia =

Namibia has a 'hybrid' or 'mixed' legal system, formed by the interweaving of a number of distinct legal traditions: a civil law system inherited from the Dutch, a common law system inherited from the British, and a customary law system inherited from before the colonisation of the continent. These traditions have had a complex interrelationship, with the English influence most apparent in procedural aspects of the legal system and methods of adjudication, and the Roman-Dutch influence most visible in its substantive private law. As a general rule, Namibia follows English law in both criminal and civil procedure, company law, constitutional law and the law of evidence; while Roman-Dutch civil law is followed in the contract law, law of delict, law of persons, law of things, family law, etc.

Namibian law, especially its civil law and common law elements, also forms the basis of the laws of Botswana, Eswatini, Lesotho, and Zimbabwe, which were introduced during the process of colonisation. Basutoland (Lesotho) received the law of the Cape Colony in 1884, and Bechuanaland (Botswana) and Southern Rhodesia (Zimbabwe) received it in 1891. Swaziland received the law of the Transvaal Colony in 1904, and South-West Africa (Namibia) received the law of the Cape Province in 1920, after its conquest by South Africa.

== Court system ==
The judiciary of Namibia consists of a three-tiered set of courts, the Lower courts, the High Court, and the Supreme Court. Parallel to this structure there are traditional courts dealing with minor matters and applying customary law.

== Specific fields of law ==
- Namibian property law

== See also ==
- Constitution of Namibia
