= Roman-Dutch law =

Dutch legal system derived from Roman law

Roman-Dutch law (Dutch: Rooms-Hollands recht, Afrikaans: Romeins-Hollandse reg) is an uncodified, scholarship-driven, and judge-made legal system based on Roman law as applied in the Netherlands in the 17th and 18th centuries. As such, it is a variety of the European continental civil law or ius commune. While Roman-Dutch law was superseded by Napoleonic codal law in the Netherlands proper as early as the beginning of the 19th century, the legal practices and principles of the Roman-Dutch system are still applied actively and passively by the courts in countries that were part of the Dutch colonial empire, or countries which are influenced by former Dutch colonies: Guyana, South Africa (and its neighbours Botswana, Lesotho, Namibia, Eswatini (formerly Swaziland), and Zimbabwe), Sri Lanka, Indonesia, Suriname, and the formerly Indonesian-occupied East Timor. It also heavily influenced Scots law. It also had some minor impact on the laws of the American state of New York, especially in introducing the office of Prosecutor (schout-fiscaal).

== History ==
Roman law was progressively abandoned during the early Middle Ages. The Theodosian Code and excerpts of latter-day imperial enactments (constitutiones) were well known in the successor Germanic states and vital to maintaining the commonplace principle of folk-right which applied pre-existing Roman law to Roman provincials and Germanic law to Germans. The Breviary of Alaric and the Lex Gundobada Romana are two of the several hybrid Romano-Germanic law codes that incorporated much Roman legal material. However, because the fall of the Western Roman Empire preceded the drafting of the Justinianic Code, early Byzantine law was never influential in Western Europe. Also, much of this early law was superseded by later feudal law. Only canon law successfully retained any substantial amount of Roman law to be influential.

Interest in the doctrines of Byzantine lawyers came when—around the year a.d. 1070—a copy of the Digest of Emperor Justinian I found its way into northern Italy. Scholars in the emerging University of Bologna, who previously had access to only a limited portion of the Justinianic code, sparked an intellectual rediscovery of Roman law through the teaching of law based on Byzantine law texts. Courts gradually applied Byzantine law—as taught in Bologna (and soon elsewhere)—first as law in subsidium to be applied when there was no local statute or custom in point, and later because judicial officers (judges, magistrates, assessors) felt that its refined legal concepts were more apt to solve complex cases than the customary laws of western and central Europe. This process, referred to as reception, took place in the Holy Roman Empire and the Mediterranean in the 13th-14th centuries, but was much slower to come to northern Europe (e.g., Saxony, Northern France, the Low Countries, Scandinavia).

In the 15th century, reception in complexu reached the Netherlands while it was associated with the Holy Roman Empire. While Italian lawyers (mos italicus) were the first to contribute to the new Byzantine-based jurisprudence, in the 16th century, French humanistic doctrinal scholars (mos gallicus) were most influential. In the 17th and 18th century, it was the Dutch who had the greatest influence. Members of the Hollandse Elegante School (“Hollandic elegant school”; 1500–1800) included Hugo Grotius, Johannes Voet, Ulrich Huber, Gerard Noodt, J. and F. van de Sande, and many others. These scholars managed to merge Roman law with legal concepts taken from traditional Dutch feudal customary law, especially from the province of Holland. The resulting mixture was predominantly Roman, but it contained some features which were characteristically Dutch: this hybrid is known as Roman-Dutch law. The Dutch applied their legal system in their colonial empire. In so doing, the distinctly Dutch branch of civil law (or ius commune) came to be applied in far-flung places, e.g., the Dutch East Indies, Dutch West Indies, Cape Colony, and Dutch Ceylon.

In the Netherlands, Roman-Dutch law abruptly ended when, in 1809, Napoleon's Dutch puppet state—the Kingdom of Holland—adopted the French Napoleonic Code, a different system but nonetheless a branch of civil law. Yet, the English respected the existing Roman Dutch law in at that time Dutch colonies that became English, such as Guyana, Ceylon and the Cape Colony. As a result, Roman-Dutch law has managed to survive, usually in a hybrid form mixed with English law, otherwise known as “Anglo-Dutch law”.

== Today ==
The influence nevertheless exists in the former Dutch-ruled areas in South America and heavily influenced former Dutch colonies like South Africa, Guyana and to a lesser extent Sri Lanka. The Roman Dutch law was not preserved in Dutch colonies which were not taken over by the English. Suriname adopted the Suriname Civil Code (Surinaams Burgerlijk Wetboek) in 1869. The Suriname Civil Code is the same as the Old Dutch Civil Code (Oud Burgerlijk Wetboek) of 1838. Suriname achieved its independence from the Netherlands in 1975. It has a democratically-elected President and Parliament, and an independent judiciary. Its legal system is based on the Suriname Civil Code and its official language is Dutch. On the other hand, in Guyana, the Roman-Dutch legal principles are still influential in the landlaw, for example the terms movable and immovable objects as opposed to personal and real property. This despite the enforcement of Civil Law of Guyana Ordinance in 1917 that favors the English style Common law system.

== Law reform in former Dutch colonies ==
The Netherlands participated in international seminars and training programmes organised by international partner organisations, ranging from a two-day seminar to a two-week programme for different legal professionals around the world. Programmes have been developed for Suriname, Aruba, Sint Maarten and Indonesia.

== See also ==
- Law of Indonesia
- Law of Namibia
- Scots law
- Law of South Africa
- Law of Sri Lanka
- Law of Timor-Leste
