= East Timor Law Journal =

East Timor Law Journal was a forum for the publication of legal opinions and critiques of law and legal policy in East Timor and facilitating legal research and information, seeking to promote the rule of law and democracy in East Timor by disseminating knowledge of the law of East Timor in English. This was hoped to increase scrutiny by the international legal and human rights agencies of compliance with fundamental rights, liberties, and freedoms, and the principles of international justice.

East Timor Law Journal provided English translations of the laws of East Timor, published analyses and commentaries on the legal system, East Timor legal and other research resources, directories and reports on legal developments. The complete body of the laws enacted by the United Nations Transitional Administration in East Timor (UNTAET) and all available English translations of the laws enacted by the National Parliament and by the Government (both Decree Laws and Decrees) as well as the Resolutions of the United Nations General Assembly and the Security Council pertaining to East Timor are available on East Timor Law Journal. A comprehensive directory of East Timor-related internet sites is also included.

The Journal is currently defunct, having published no papers since 2011.
