= Namibian property law =

Article 16(1) of the Constitution of Namibia protects the right of all persons to acquire, own and dispose of all forms of immovable and movable property, but grants the Parliament of Namibia the authority to regulate or prohibit the right of non-citizens to acquire property. Article 16(2) allows the government to expropriate property in the public interest so long as compensation is paid.

The Affirmative Repositioning political movement wants to ban foreign nationals from owning land.
