= Sandra Joireman =

American political scientist

Sandra Fullerton Joireman is the Weinstein Chair of Global Studies and a professor of Political Science at the University of Richmond. Her work focuses on property rights, post-conflict return migration, and customary law.

== Early life and education ==
Joireman graduated from Clinton High School in Clinton, Iowa in 1985. She has an A.B. from Washington University in St. Louis (1989), and then received her M.A. (1992) and Ph.D. (1995) from the University of California Los Angeles. Following her Ph.D. she worked in the United Kingdom, Uganda, Ethiopia, and Kosovo. After briefly teaching at St. Bonaventure University, in 2001 Joireman joined Wheaton College (Illinois) where she was promoted to full professor in 2009. In 2013 she moved to the University of Richmond where she is the Weinstein Chair of Global Studies.

== Research ==
Joireman is known for her work on land tenure and forced displacement. Her 2012 book, Where There is No Government: Enforcing Property Rights in Common Law Africa, focused on how property law was enforced and who did enforce it in Ghana, Kenya, and Uganda. In 2000 she published on property rights in Ethiopia and Eritrea. In 2017, Joireman was awarded the Sanjaya Lall prize for her paper in Oxford Development Studies that examined the ability of displaced adults to reclaim family property lost during humanitarian crises when they were children. Joireman's 2022 book, Peace, Preference and Property: Return Migration After Violent Conflict, examined factors influencing return migration after violent conflict, highlighting the key variables of time, political change, property restitution, and ethnicity. The book discussed the challenges of intergenerational return migration and property restitution and addressed case studies such as Kosovo, Liberia, and Uganda.
