= Dire Dawa =

Autonomous city in eastern Ethiopia

Dire Dawa: Dirree Dhawaa (Oromo); ድሬዳዋ (Amharic); Diridhaba (Somali)
- Chartered city
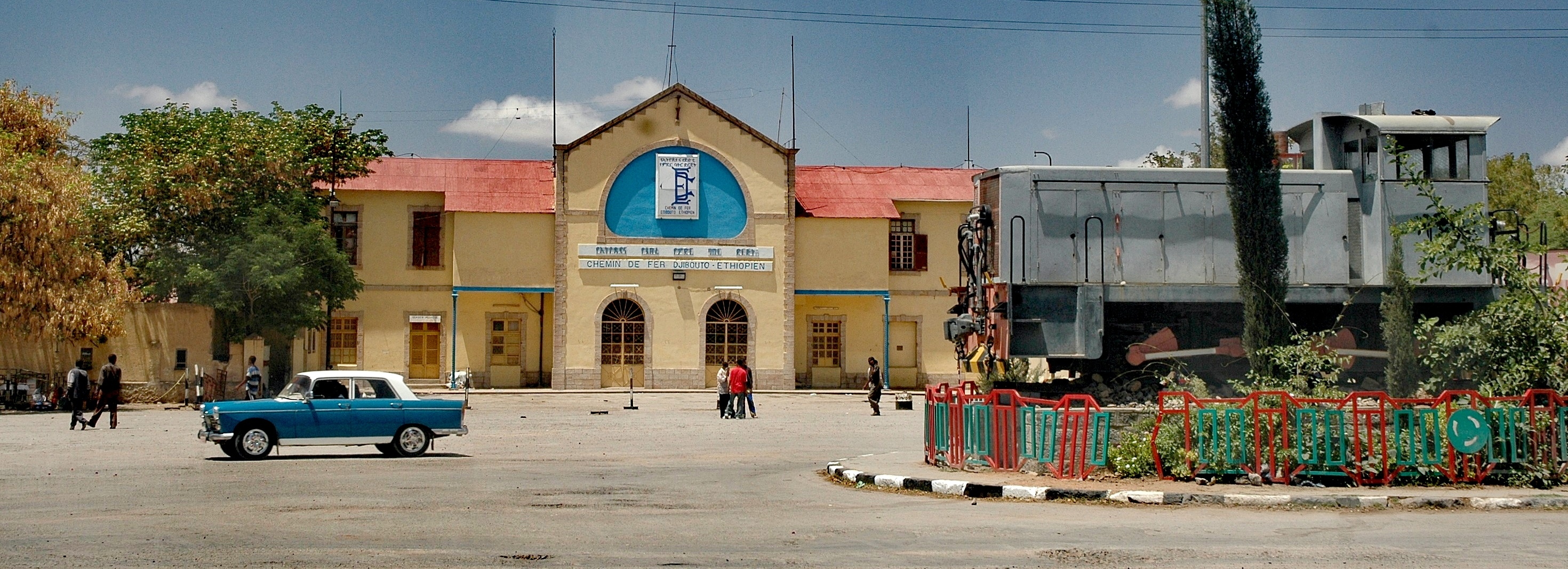
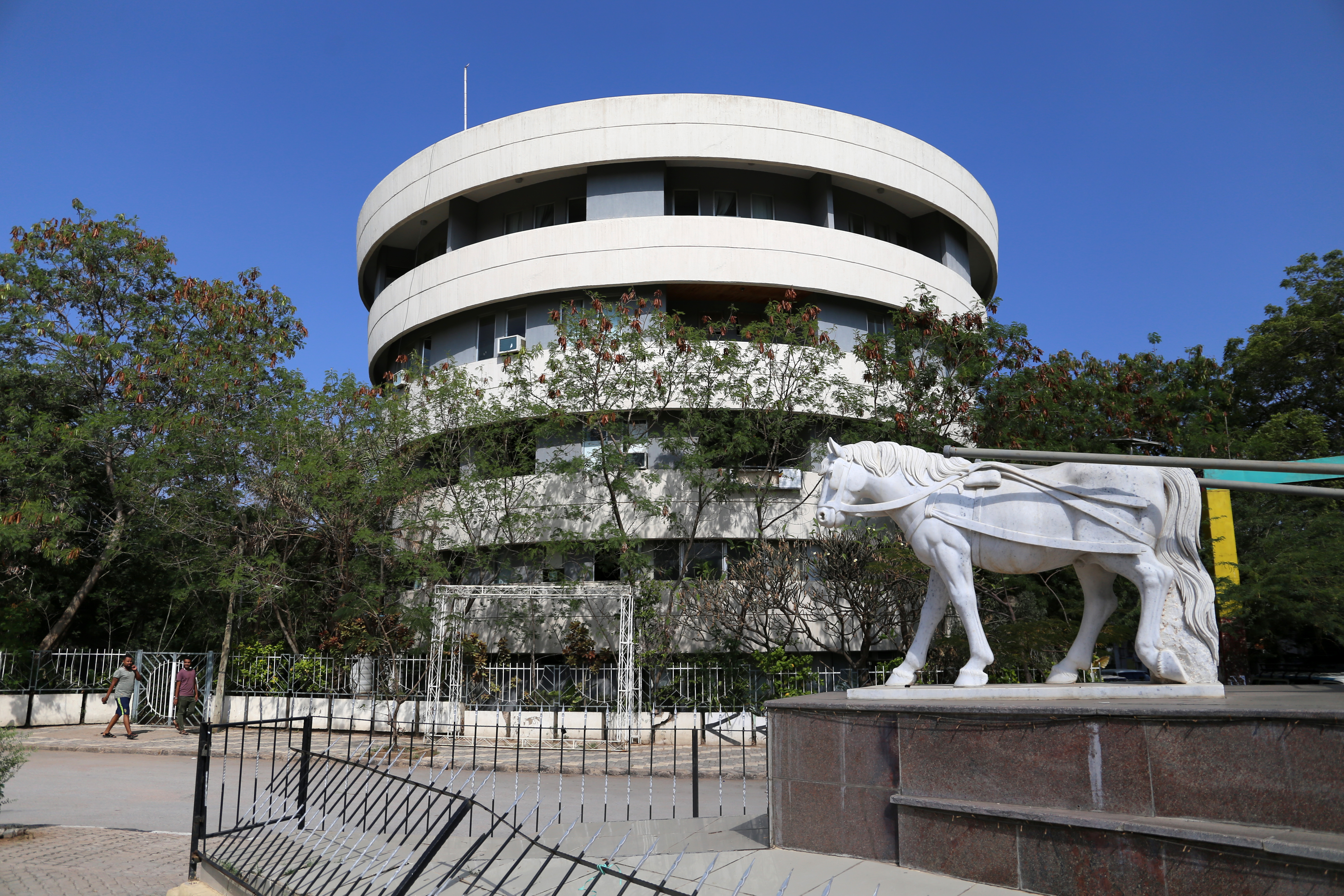
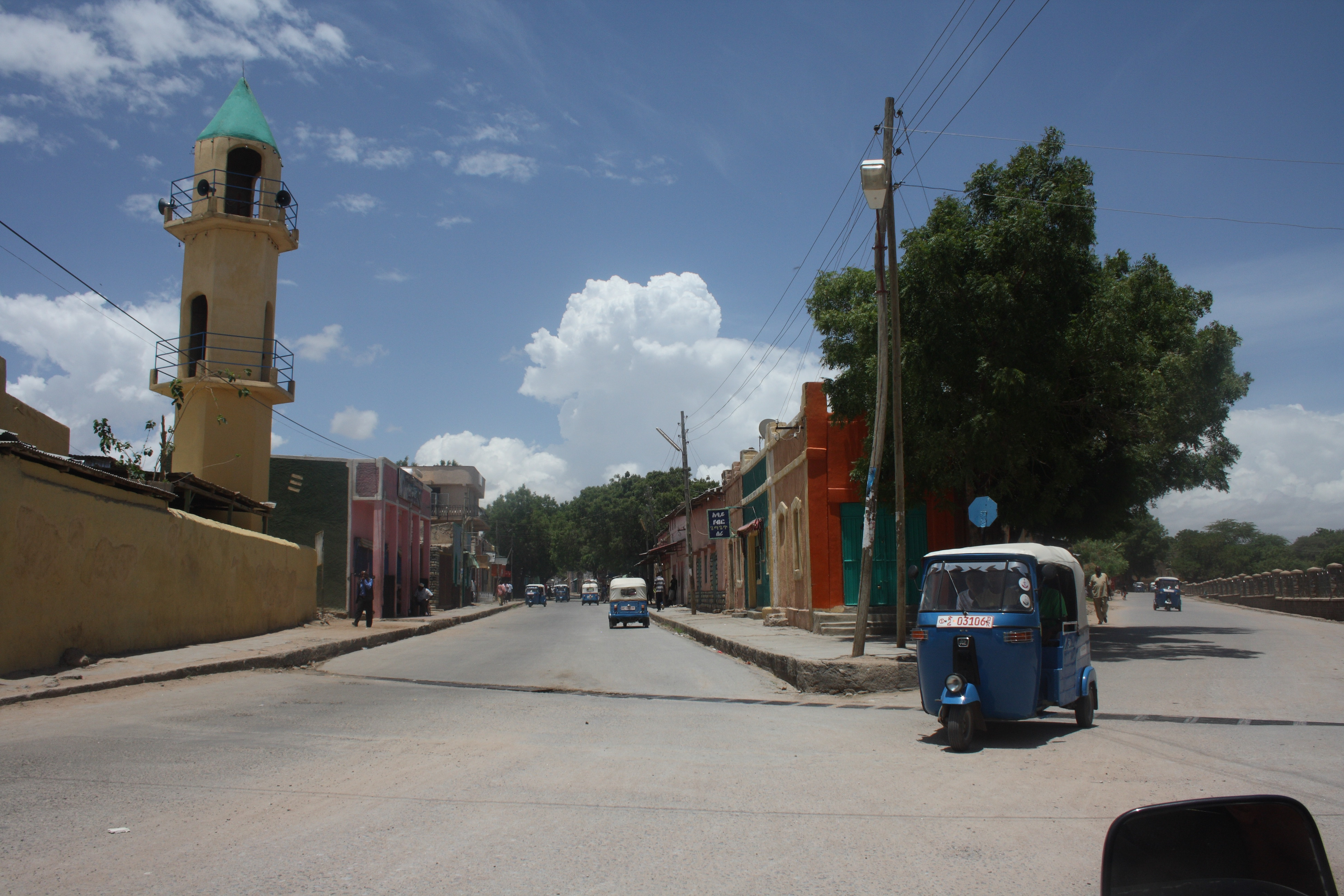
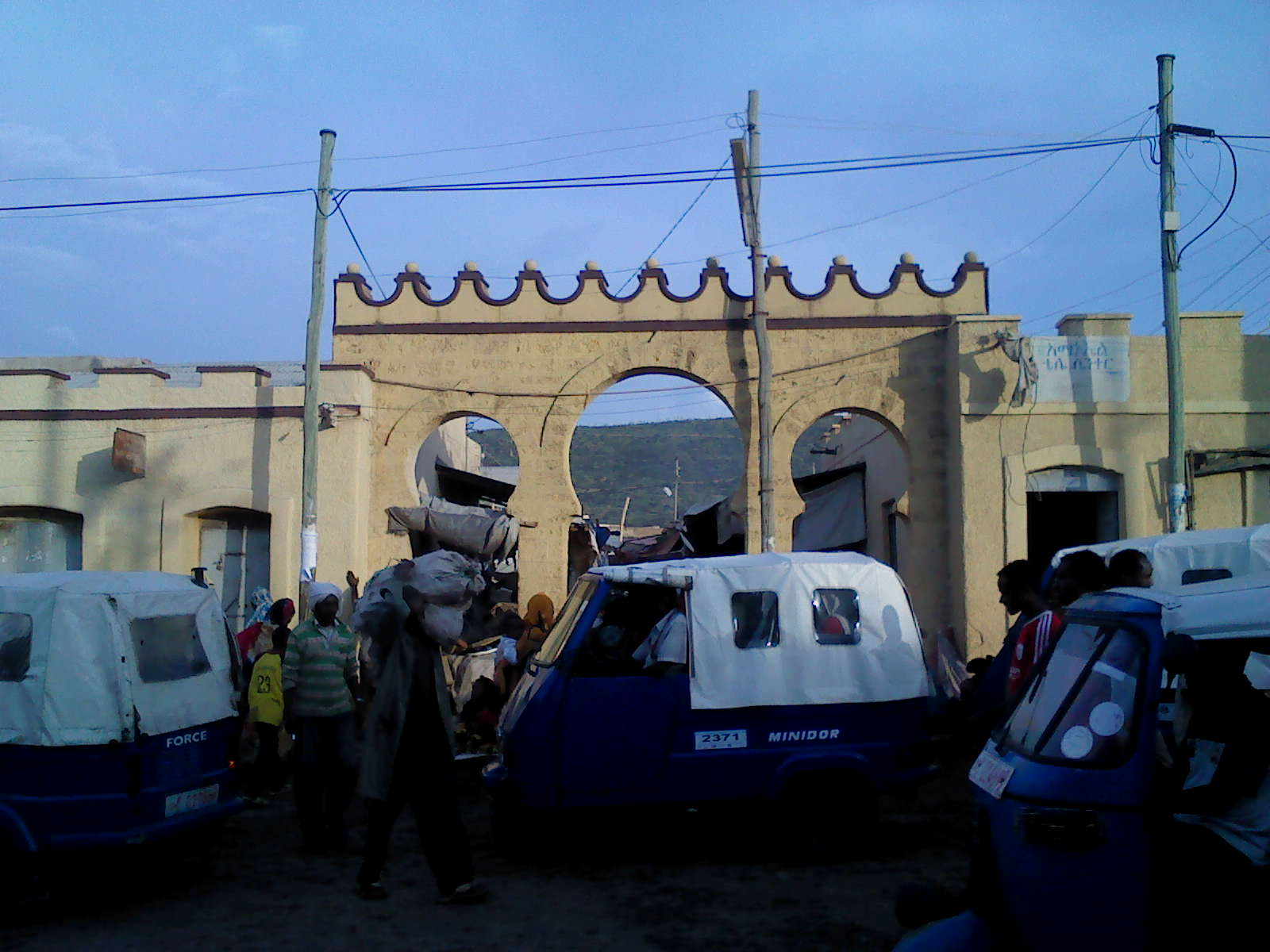
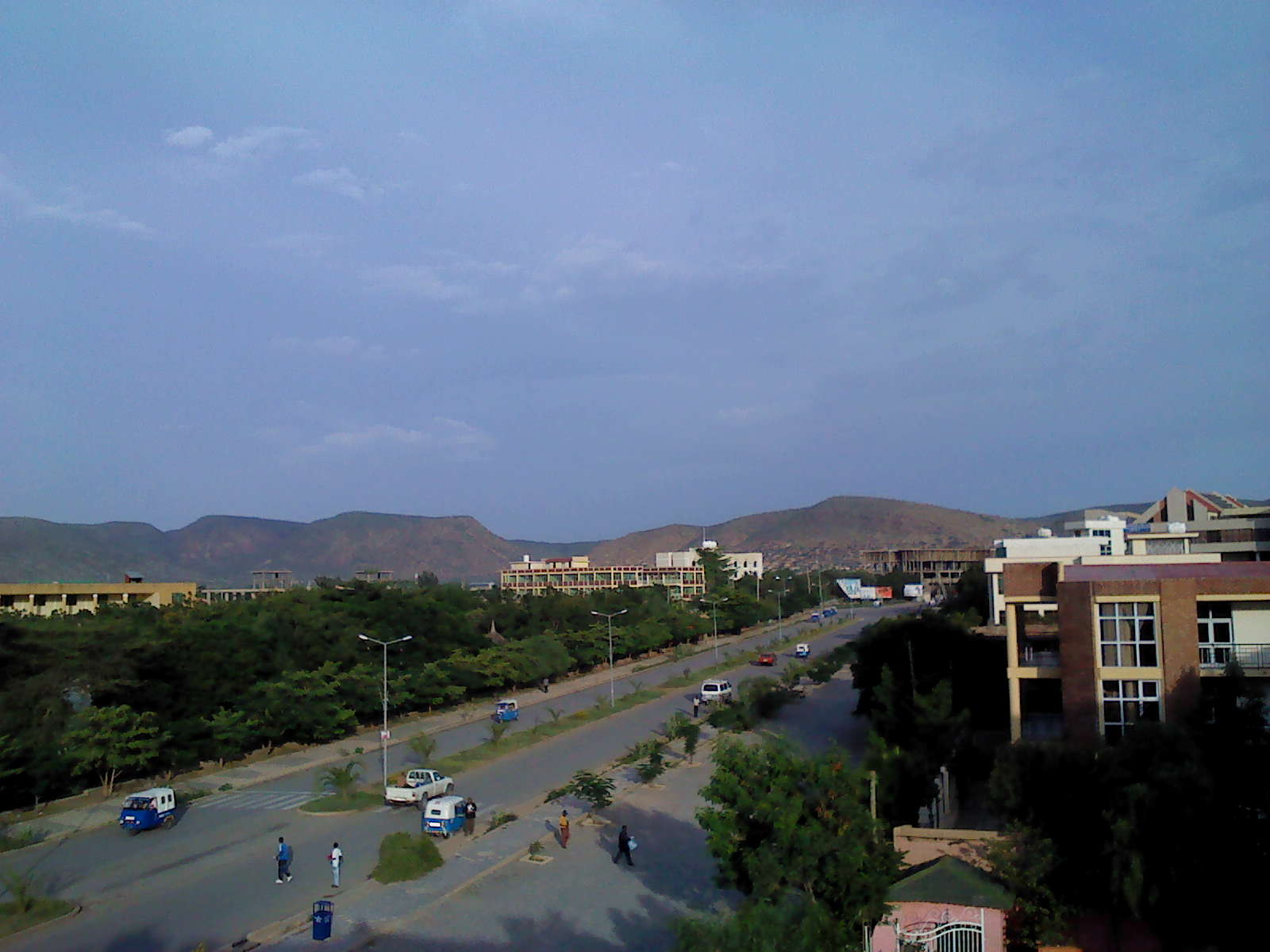
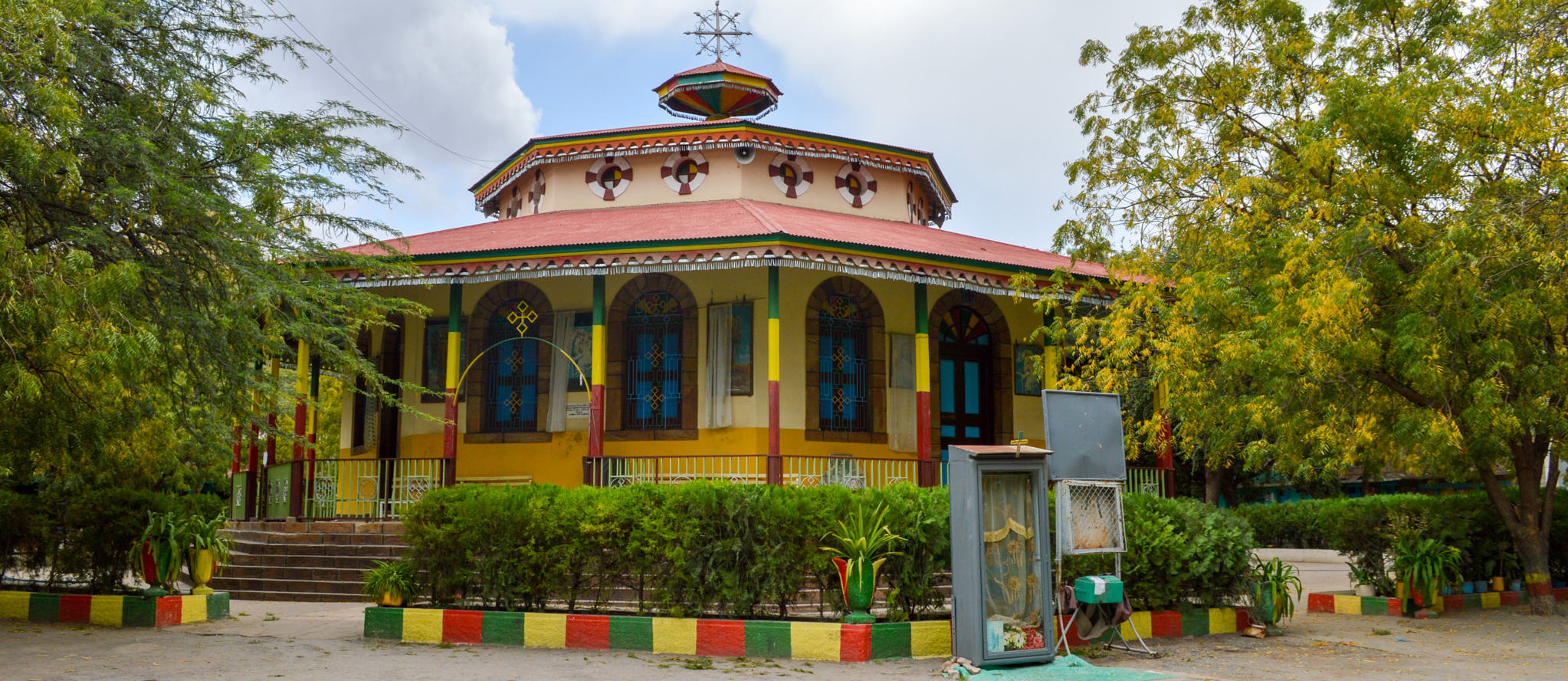
- From top: Dire Dawa Train Station; Dire Dawa Downtown; Street view of Dire Dawa; Kafira Market; Skyline view in afternoon; Bete Mikael Church

- Flag Seal

- Location within Ethiopia Location within the Horn of Africa Location within Africa
- Coordinates: 9°36′N 41°52′E
- Country: Ethiopia
- Founded: 24 December 1902

Government
  - Type: Chartered city
  - Mayor: Kedir Juhar

Area
  - Chartered city: 1,213 km^{2} (468 sq mi)
- Elevation: 1,276 m (4,186 ft)

Population (2025)
  - Chartered city: 600,000
  - Density: 490/km^{2} (1,300/sq mi)
  - Urban: 277,000
- Time zone: UTC+3 (EAT)
- Area code: (+251) 25
- HDI (2019): 0.570 medium · 2nd of 11
- Website: www.dire-dawa.gov.et

Dire Dawa (Oromo: Dirree Dhawaa, lit. 'Place of Remedy'; Somali: Diridhaba, meaning "where the Dir hit his spear into the ground" or "The true Dir", Amharic: ድሬዳዋ, Harari: ዲርሬዳዋ, lit. "Plain of Medicine") is a city in eastern Ethiopia near the Oromia Region and Oromo border and one of two chartered cities in Ethiopia (the other being Addis Ababa, the capital). Dire Dawa alongside present-day Sitti Zone were a part of the Dire Dawa autonomous region of the Somali Region stipulated in the 1987 Ethiopian Constitution until 1993 when it was split by the federal government into a separately administered chartered city.

It is divided administratively into two woredas, the city proper and the non-urban woredas of Gurgura.

Dire Dawa lies in the eastern part of the nation, on the Dechatu River, at the foot of a ring of cliffs. The western outskirts of the city lie on the Gorro River, a tributary of the Dechatu River. It is located at the latitude and longitude of 9°36′N 41°52′E. The city is an industrial centre, home to several markets and the Dire Dawa Airport.

The projected population for 2015 was 440,000 for the entire chartered city and 277,000 for the city proper, making the latter the second largest city in Ethiopia.

== History ==
=== Origins ===
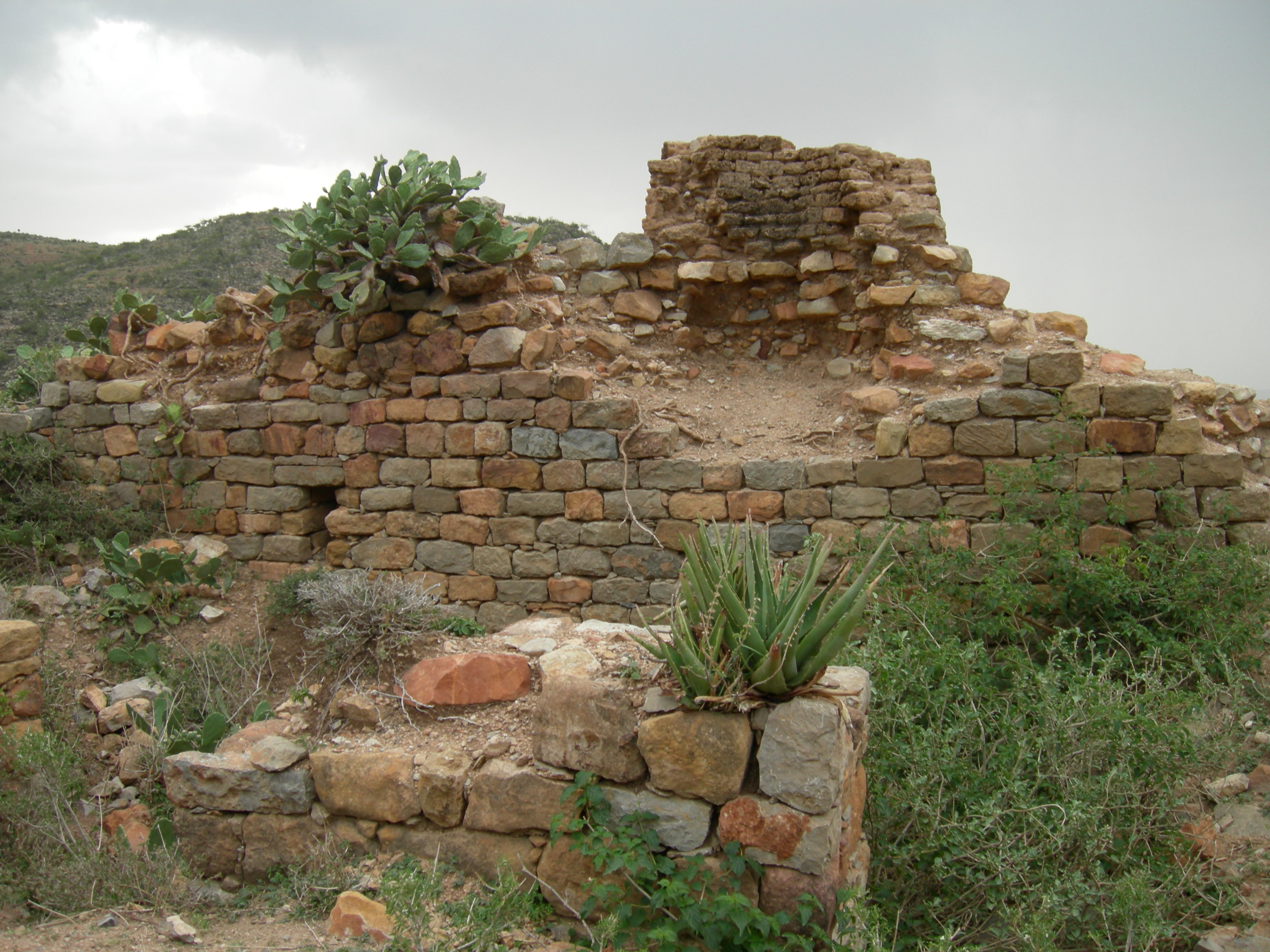
Ruins of the thirteenth-century Harla town of Hubat near Dire Dawa

The region was already inhabited in Mesolithic times, as revealed by rock paintings and Middle Stone Age artifacts in the cave of Porc-Épic and Laga-Oda only a few kilometers from Dire Dawa. The area surrounding Dire Dawa is believed to have been a settlement of the extinct Harla people.

Historically, the area used to be part of Adal Sultanate during the medieval times. During the 17th century onwards, the region was considered the domain of the Emirate of Harar until Menelik's conquest of the kingdom in 1887 and consequently became incorporated into modern Ethiopia from thereon.

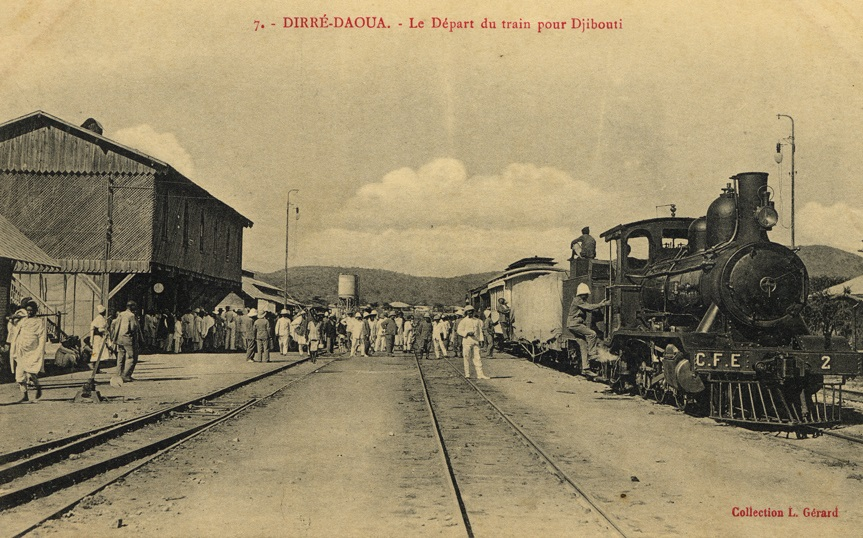
Train departing from Dire Dawa c. 1912

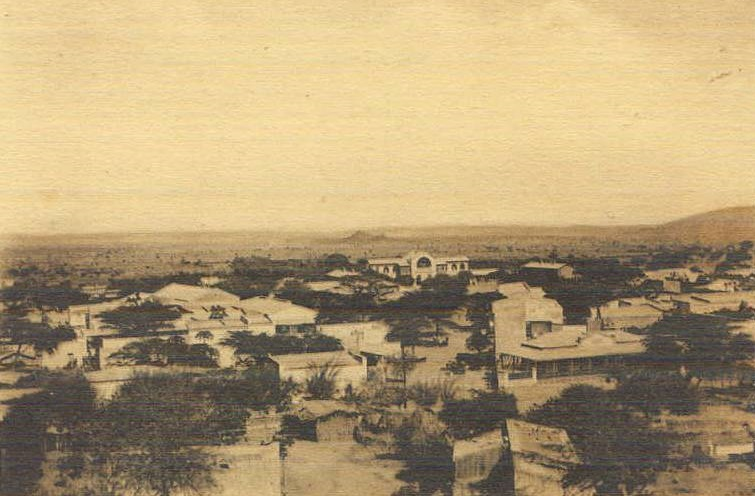
Panorama of Dire Dawa c. 1915

=== Foundation (1902–1936) ===
The present-day town of Dire Dawa (327 km by rail from Djibouti), however, is of very recent origin. It owes its foundation to a technical problem: when it became impossible to lay the Addis Ababa-Djibouti Railway via Harar because of the steep access to the town, Emperor Menelik II accepted (in a letter dated 5 November 1896) that the first part of the line might finish at a village at the foot of the mountains, which should be named Addis Harar ("New Harrar"). The railway reached this location on 24 December 1902, a date which may be considered the day of Dire Dawa's foundation. The new name, however, did not win recognition.

For financial and diplomatic reasons the railway was not continued until 1909 and the final inauguration of the whole line from Djibouti to Addis Ababa-again delayed by the revolution of 1916-only took place on 7 June 1917. During all this time, Dire Dawa was practically the town profited much and became a "boom city", attracting most of the trade which formerly passed through Harar. By 1902 the Ethiopian government, anticipating the future economic importance of Dire Dawa, had already transferred the customs station for trade with the Red Sea from Gildessa to Dire Dawa.

Dire Dawa developed into two settlements separated by the Dechatu River, which was dry for most of the year and became a torrent only when it rained. The north-western part of the town was planned and constructed very regularly, mostly by the engineers of the railway company. At first, this part of the town mostly housed the employees of the railway company, but it later attracted, besides the French, also Greeks, Armenians, other Europeans and Arabs, who opened shops and hotels and founded some industry as well. In 1909 the French Capuchin Mission settled in Dire Dawa. At that time Dire Dawa looked like a French town. The other part of the town, southeast of the river, concentrated around the market and was inhabited mainly by Somali and a few Arab traders.

In September 1916 the fleeing troops of Lij Iyasu took hold of the town. Though Lij Iyasu's governor there, the Syrian Hasib al-Idlibi, assured their security, 400 Europeans left the town and the rail traffic had to be suspended. After the battle of Maeso, the governmental troops from Addis Ababa re-established a regular administration.

During the 1920s, the south-eastern part of the town also started to develop. Its inhabitants were mostly Gurgura and Oromo, the other Ethiopians playing only a minor role. The population here grew to 3,000, while that of the whole town numbered 20,000. Between the two World Wars, two hospitals were established in Dire Dawa, one by the railway company and another in 1934 by the government. Education on a primary level was provided by a government school, a Catholic mission school and several schools for the different foreign communities in the town (Greek, Italian, Indian).

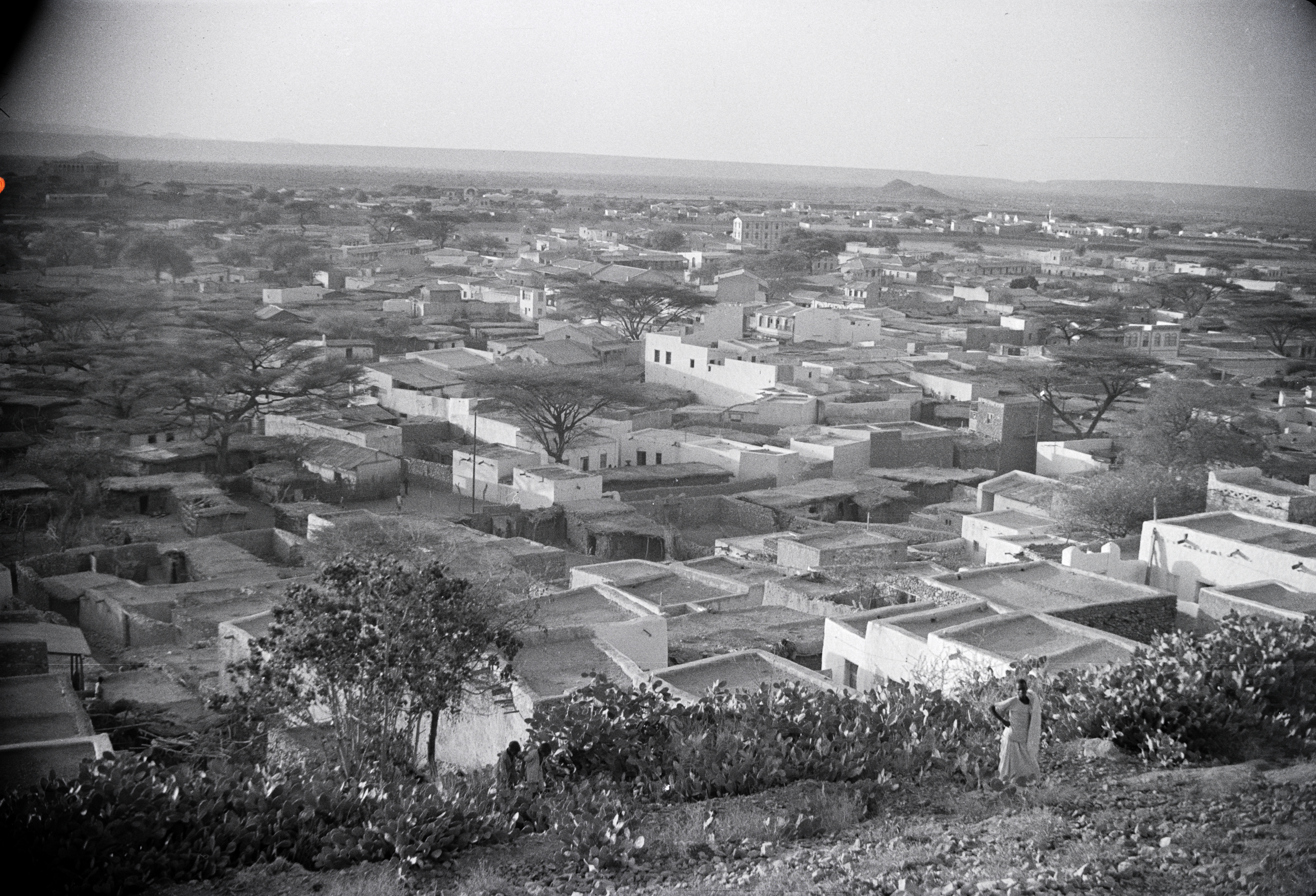
Dire Dawa 1934

Dire Dawa's first governor was Ato Mersha Nahusenay. Formerly the governor of the strategic village of Gildessa and its environs, Mersha was instrumental in the construction of the first railway and establishment of the railway city. The imperial railway company (Cie) played a key role in the early development of the city, particularly Gezira (aka Kezira), under the authority of the Ethiopian government. The original failed company was reorganized as the joint-government Franco-Ethiopian Railway in 1908 and, after a period of financial negotiation and recapitalization, construction began anew, linking the city with the Ethiopian capital Addis Ababa in 1917. The Dire Dawa-Harar road was improved in 1928, shortening the travel time to only a few hours. In 1931, the Bank of Ethiopia opened its first branch in the city and, a generation later, the writer C.F. Rey described the city as the most "advanced" urban center in the area, with good roads, electric lights, and piped water.

=== Italian occupation (1936–1941) ===
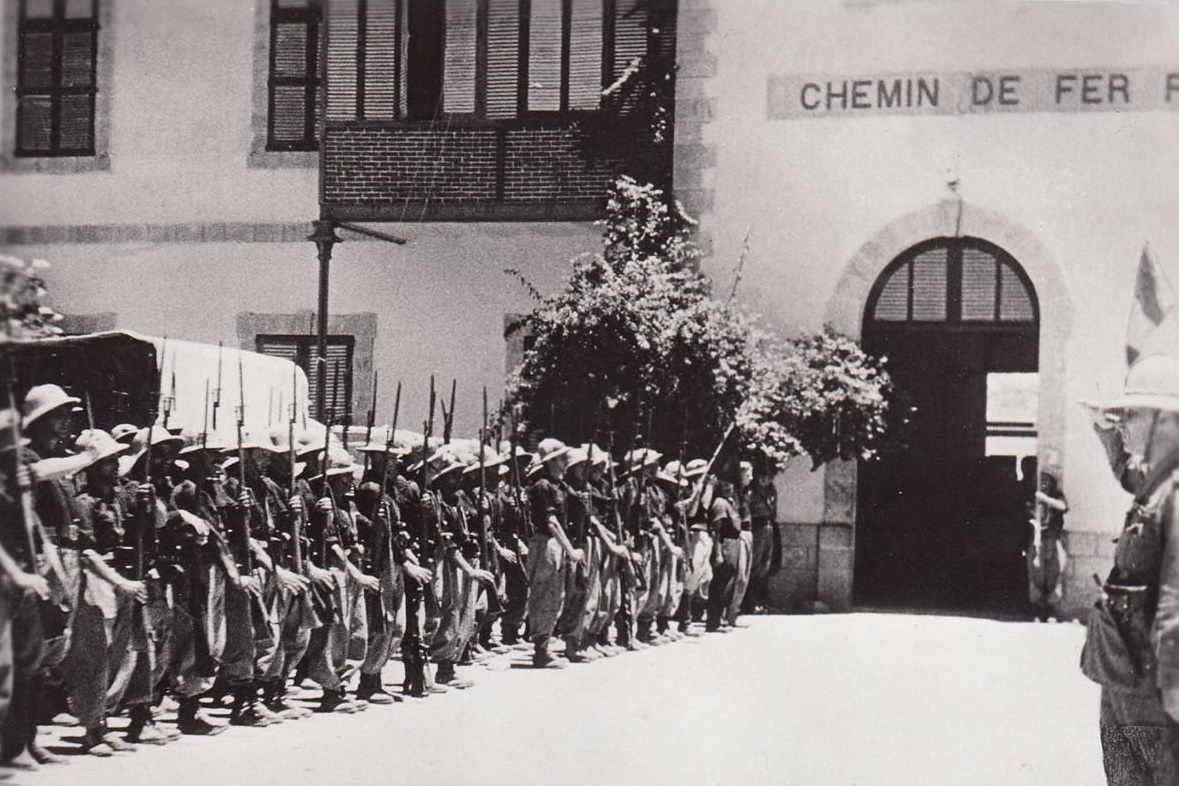
Italian troops taking possession of the Dire Dawa railway station in 1936

On 9 May 1936 Dire Dawa was occupied by Italian troops coming from Harar, after Somali troops from Djibouti had prevented looting during the period of interregnum. Badoglio and Graziani celebrated their meeting on the railway station of Dire Dawa. The Italians constructed several new buildings in Dire Dawa, especially for the administration and the Fascist party. They also improved the roads and enlarged the airport so that their military planes could take off from there to bomb the patriot forces in the Gara Mulleta. As for other towns, the Italians conceived a "piano regolatore" for the construction of an Italian town in Dire Dawa. However, their occupation ended before they could complete these plans.

During the Italian invasion, Mussolini ordered that Addis Ababa and Dire Dawa be spared air attacks (which included the use of chemical weapons such as mustard gas) and other destruction as a response to the demands of the United States and certain European countries for the safety of their citizens. The Italian army entered the country from the colonies of Eritrea in the north and Somalia in the southeast. Following all major engagements of the war, Dire Dawa was the location of the meeting of the two Italian forces. General Graziani's units, advancing from Harar, reached the city's barbed-wire fence on 6 May 1936, the day after the occupation of Addis Ababa and Emperor Haile Selassie's flight along the railroad to Djibouti and Palestine. They were met by two French armed cars: the railway remained under French administration and they had remained to protect French interests. The next day, the first train under Italian control left Addis Ababa: it brought Italy's 46th Infantry Regiment and finally closed the pincers of the two Italian invasion forces. The occupation of the town was more or less a formality, although the antifascist resistance called the Arbegnoch "Patriots" continued to operate throughout the conflict. It was officially known by its Italian spelling Dire Daua during the occupation.

=== Late Imperial (1941–1974) ===
In June 1940 the British started to bomb the town and on 29 March 1941 Dire Dawa was occupied by the Allied forces from Harar. The town remained under British Military Administration, being the headquarters for the British Reserved Area, till it was handed over to the Ethiopian government in 1947. In the following decades the town greatly expanded and the population grew to 160,000. The infrastructure was ameliorated and several industrial plants were established.

Following the restoration of the empire in 1941, Dire Dawa was among the early provincial towns to have its own football league. Around 1947, their team—the Taffari—participated in the Ethiopian Championship series. That same year, the Railroad Workers Syndicate of Dire Dawa, a labor union, was formed for welfare purposes. Although its leadership cooperated with the government, its attempt to strike in 1949 was brutally suppressed by imperial troops; at the time, all strikes were seen as forms of insurrection or treason. In 1955, a public address system was installed in the central square to receive and rebroadcast state radio transmissions.

=== Derg administration (1974–1991) ===
The Ethiopian Revolution affected the city in many ways. Starting March 1974, there was some worker unrest; six people were wounded when police opened fire on demonstrating railwaymen and students on 17 April. Many Europeans, Yemeni Arabs, and Indians left Dire Dawa; the Greek and Armenian churches were eventually closed due to dwindling membership. On 3 February 1975, the Derg announced that the Cotton Company of Ethiopia was among 14 textile enterprises to be fully nationalized. The cement factory was also later nationalized. In August 1976, the entire leadership of the local branch of the teachers' union was sacked for alleged anti-revolutionary activities. Ten new officials were appointed pending fresh elections.

During the Ogaden War, Dire Dawa was attacked during the Battle of Dire Dawa by Somali troops in the summer of 1977. Opposing them were the Second Militia Division, the 201st Battalion, the 781st Battalion of the Seventy-eighth Brigade, the Fourth Mechanized Company, and one platoon of the Eightieth Tank Battalion, with only two tanks. On August 17 the Somalis moved in from the Harewa side to the northeast of the city by night. Despite losing three tanks to landmines en route, they launched a ground and air assault the following day. Initially caught off guard, the Ethiopians had anticipated the attack on Jijiga instead. The battle was fierce, but it was ultimately the Ethiopian air force that shattered the Somali resolve by destroying sixteen of their tanks. By day's end, the attackers had exhausted their strength and retreated, leaving behind a trail of abandoned equipment, including tanks, armored cars, rocket launchers, artillery pieces, as well as hundreds of rifles and machine guns, all proudly displayed by the Ethiopian forces. According to Gebru Tareke, the success of the Ethiopian Army in holding Dire Dawa (17–18 August 1977) against the Somali Army was decisive in winning the Ogaden War.

In May 1979, 250 Oromos who were detained in the prisons of Dire Dawa were executed by the Derg regime.

=== Federal Democratic Republic (1991–present) ===
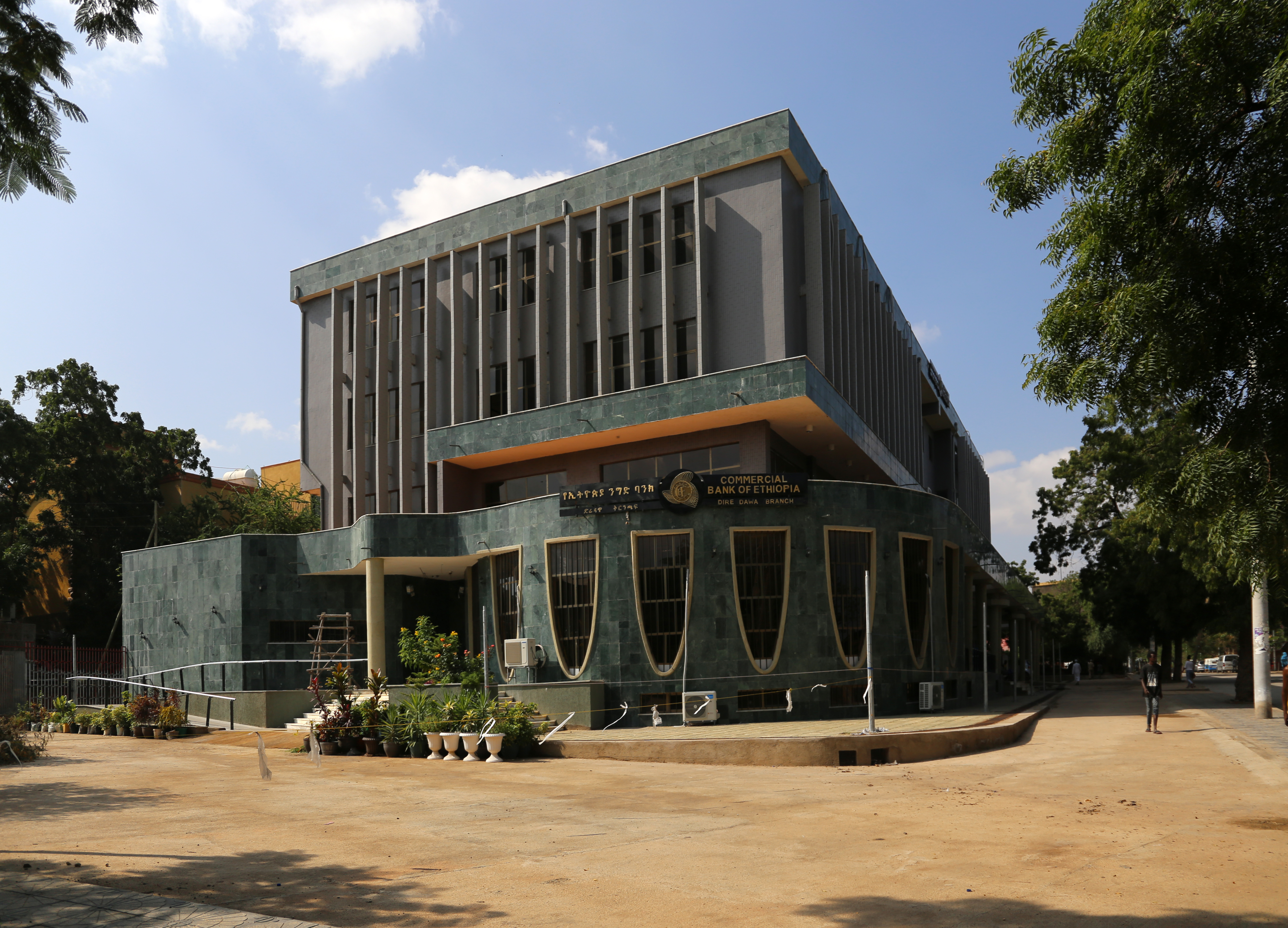
Commercial Bank of Ethiopia building

Dire Dawa was occupied by the EPRDF on 31 May 1991 and there were reports of about 100 people killed resisting the EPRDF. Both the Issa and Gurgura Liberation Front and the Oromo Liberation Front claimed the city. As a result, there were numerous clashes between the two groups from 1991 until 1993. When the Somali Regional State was being established in 1993, it wanted Dire Dawa to be its capital. It was also alternatively proposed the city should fall under the Harari Regional State. This was opposed by the Oromia Region, of which Dire Dawa was part of at the time, so the federal government placed the city under its own jurisdiction to avoid territorial conflict between the two regions.

On 24 June 2002, a small explosive was detonated at the headquarters of the Ethiopian Railway Commission in Dire Dawa. The Oromo Liberation Front afterwards claimed responsibility for this attack in retaliation "for the continuing harassment of Oromo students, merchants, and farmers by the Ethiopian government." Although blamed for other isolated incidents, this was the latest bombing inside Ethiopia for which the OLF claimed responsibility.

Dire Dawa moved out of federal administration to become a chartered city in 2004 after the federal parliament approved the city charter in proclamation 416/2004.

The city was flooded in August 2006 when both the Dechatu River and the Gorro River overflowed their banks. About 200 people were reported dead, thousands were displaced and there was extensive damage to homes and markets especially along the Dechatu River. Floods are fairly common during the June–September rainy season; over 200 people in the region had been killed by flooding in 2005 that did millions of dollars in damage.

An overturned truck, heading from Dengego to Dire Dawa, killed 41 people 4 March 2009. The truck was carrying an unknown number of day laborers when the accident happened, and 38 were immediately killed and as many as 50 were injured. Dead and injured were taken to Dil-chora Hospital in Dire Dawa. The cause was not immediately known.

Currently, there are plans to revitalize the city. A historic and popular part of the city is to be demolished and replaced by a financial center, malls, mixed-use buildings, hotels, recreational facilities, and hospitals. As part of the plan, historical buildings will be renovated, and a new space will be allotted for building new homes and businesses for those displaced by the move. New roads, parks, and an industrial zone will also be built, and major railway project is expected to greatly increase business activity in the city.

== Climate ==
Dire Dawa has a borderline tropical savanna climate (Köppen Aw/As) just above a hot semi-arid climate (BSh). The mean annual temperature of Dire Dawa is about 25.9 °C or 78.6 °F. The average maximum temperature of Dire Dawa is 32.8 °C or 91.0 °F, while its average minimum temperature is about 19.0 °C or 66.2 °F. The region has two rain seasons; that is, a small rain season from March to April, and a more pronounced rain season that extends from July to August. The aggregate average annual rainfall that the region gets from these two seasons is about 670 millimetres or 26 inches.

Climate data for Dire Dawa (1991-2020, extremes 1952–present)
| Month | Jan | Feb | Mar | Apr | May | Jun | Jul | Aug | Sep | Oct | Nov | Dec | Year |
|---|---|---|---|---|---|---|---|---|---|---|---|---|---|
| Record high °C (°F) | 38.0 (100.4) | 42.0 (107.6) | 42.0 (107.6) | 37.8 (100.0) | 39.9 (103.8) | 39.5 (103.1) | 38.2 (100.8) | 37.3 (99.1) | 37.4 (99.3) | 38.4 (101.1) | 36.4 (97.5) | 36.0 (96.8) | 42.0 (107.6) |
| Mean daily maximum °C (°F) | 29.3 (84.7) | 31.1 (88.0) | 32.8 (91.0) | 33.4 (92.1) | 34.5 (94.1) | 35.6 (96.1) | 33.9 (93.0) | 32.7 (90.9) | 32.2 (90.0) | 33.0 (91.4) | 31.0 (87.8) | 29.4 (84.9) | 32.6 (90.7) |
| Daily mean °C (°F) | 22.2 (72.0) | 23.7 (74.7) | 26.0 (78.8) | 26.8 (80.2) | 28.7 (83.7) | 29.2 (84.6) | 27.5 (81.5) | 26.7 (80.1) | 27.1 (80.8) | 25.9 (78.6) | 23.8 (74.8) | 21.9 (71.4) | 25.8 (78.4) |
| Mean daily minimum °C (°F) | 14.7 (58.5) | 16.4 (61.5) | 18.9 (66.0) | 20.7 (69.3) | 21.8 (71.2) | 22.6 (72.7) | 21.1 (70.0) | 20.6 (69.1) | 20.9 (69.6) | 18.8 (65.8) | 16.2 (61.2) | 14.6 (58.3) | 19.0 (66.2) |
| Record low °C (°F) | 3.0 (37.4) | 6.0 (42.8) | 7.2 (45.0) | 5.0 (41.0) | 10.3 (50.5) | 11.8 (53.2) | 7.3 (45.1) | 6.5 (43.7) | 8.5 (47.3) | 6.0 (42.8) | 7.6 (45.7) | 1.0 (33.8) | 1.0 (33.8) |
| Average rainfall mm (inches) | 15 (0.6) | 27 (1.1) | 74 (2.9) | 113 (4.4) | 78 (3.1) | 42 (1.7) | 115 (4.5) | 158 (6.2) | 105 (4.1) | 36 (1.4) | 16 (0.6) | 13 (0.5) | 792 (31.1) |
| Average rainy days (≥ 0.1 mm) | 2 | 3 | 7 | 10 | 6 | 5 | 11 | 14 | 10 | 3 | 2 | 1 | 74 |
| Average relative humidity (%) | 55 | 56 | 55 | 55 | 47 | 44 | 50 | 53 | 52 | 45 | 49 | 51 | 51 |
| Average dew point °C (°F) | 11 (52) | 12 (54) | 12 (54) | 15 (59) | 15 (59) | 14 (57) | 15 (59) | 16 (61) | 15 (59) | 12 (54) | 12 (54) | 11 (52) | 13 (56) |
| Mean monthly sunshine hours | 294.5 | 265.6 | 257.3 | 246.0 | 244.9 | 204.0 | 220.1 | 244.9 | 234.0 | 248.0 | 282.0 | 300.7 | 3,042 |
| Mean daily sunshine hours | 9.5 | 9.4 | 8.3 | 8.2 | 7.9 | 6.8 | 7.1 | 7.9 | 7.8 | 8.0 | 9.4 | 9.7 | 8.3 |
Source 1: Météo Climat
Source 2: Deutscher Wetterdienst (humidity 1957-1982 and sun 1994-2012), World Meteorological Organisation (rainfall 1981–2010), Time and Date (dewpoints, 2005-2015)

== Demographics ==
Ethnic groups of Dire Dawa (2007)
1. Oromo (46.0%)
2. Somali (24.0%)
3. Amhara (20.0%)
4. Gurage (4.50%)
5. Other (5.50%)
Religion in Dire Dawa (2007)
1. Muslim (70.9%)
2. Orthodox (25.6%)
3. P'ent'ay (2.80%)
4. Catholic (0.40%)
5. Traditional faiths (0.10%)
6. Other (0.20%)

The projected population for 1 July 2015 was 440,000 for the entire chartered city and 277,000 for the city proper, making the latter the seventh largest city in Ethiopia.

Based on the 2007 Census conducted by the Central Statistical Agency of Ethiopia (CSA), Dire Dawa had a population of 341,834, of whom 171,461 were men and 170,461 women. 233,224 or 68.23% of the population were urban inhabitants. For all of Dire Dawa, 76,815 households were counted living in 72,937 housing units, which resulted in an average of 4.5 persons per household, with urban households having 4.2 people per household on average, and rural households 4.9 people. Ethnic groups in the region include the Oromo (157,991, 46%), Somali (83,114, 24%), Amhara (68,887, 20%), Gurage (15,554, 4.5%), among other groups (5.5%). The religion with the most believers in Dire Dawa is Islam with 70.9%, 25.6% are Ethiopian Orthodox, 2.8% Protestant, and 0.4% Catholic.

Traditionally the Nole Oromo clan used the area as grazing land, and farming in the Laga Harre district. They live alongside the Gurgura clan which share both Oromo and Somali identities, speaking the Oromo language and tracing their genealogy to the Dir, a Somali clan family. The Issa subclan of the Dir make up a significant number of urban and rural Dire Dawa, whereas the Gadabuursi subclan of the Dir mainly reside within the urban town and also in the rural areas surrounding the chartered city state.

I.M. Lewis (1998) states:

"Including the land round Harar and Dire Dawa inhabited by the Somalis of the 'Iise and Gadabuursi clans."

A map of the regions and zones of Ethiopia

According to the CSA, as of 2004, 90.76% of the population had safe drinking water: 69.61% of rural and 99.48% of urban inhabitants having access. Values for other reported common indicators of the standard of living for Dire Dawa as of 2005 include the following: 11.4% of the inhabitants fall into the lowest wealth quintile; adult literacy for men is 76.6% and for women 53%; and the civic infant mortality rate is 71 infant deaths per 1,000 live births, which is less than the nationwide average of 77; at least half of these deaths occurred in the infants' first month of life.

== Transportation ==
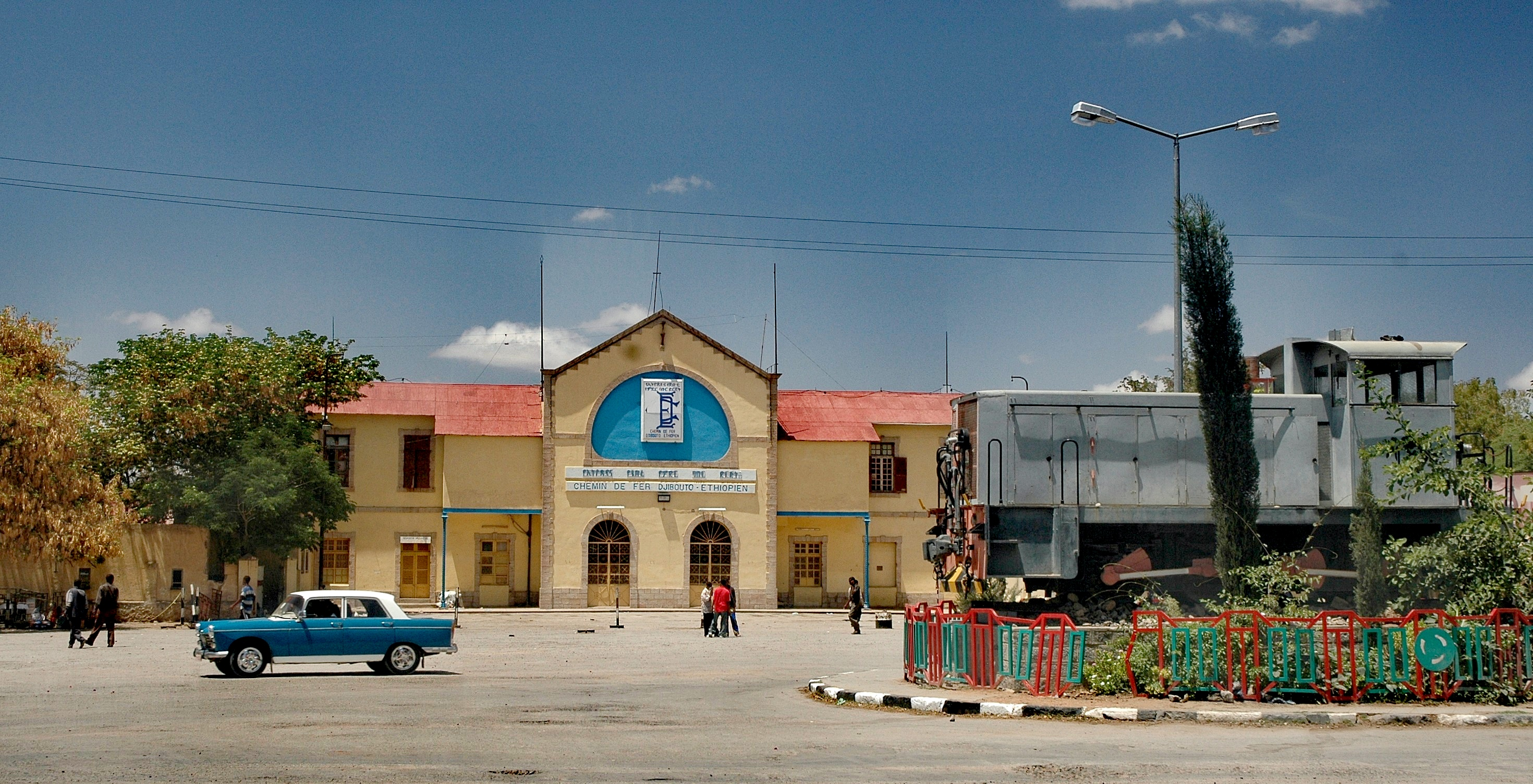
Dire Dawa Railway Station

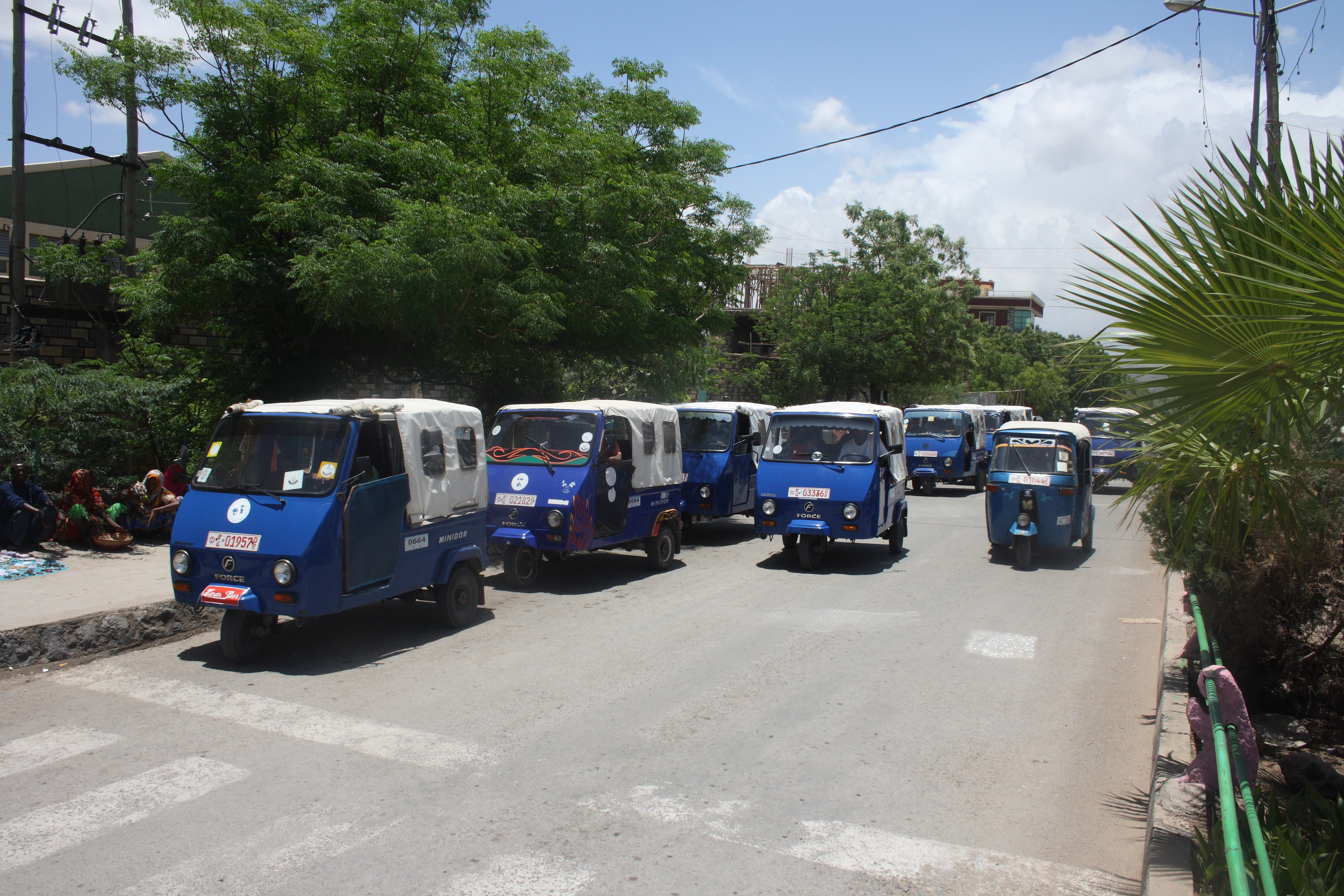
Taxicab stand in Dire Dawa

Dire Dawa is served by a station on the Addis Ababa–Djibouti Railway, which is located 10 km northwest of the city centre close to the town of Melka Jebdu. In addition, the city is served by the Ethio-Djibouti Railways with its western terminus located in the city centre. The Dire Dawa Airport offers flights to and from the city. Additionally, the Selam Bus Line Share Company provides inter-city bus service. The taxicabs are often called Bajaj in Dire Dawa.

== Education ==
The Dire Dawa University was founded in 2006.

== Places of worship ==
Among the places of worship, there are predominantly Muslim mosques. There are also Christian churches and temples : Ethiopian Orthodox Tewahedo Church, Ethiopian Evangelical Church Mekane Yesus (Lutheran World Federation), Ethiopian Kale Heywet Church, Ethiopian Catholic Archeparchy of Addis Abeba (Catholic Church), Ethiopian Full Gospel Believers' Church.

== Government ==
The Dire Dawa City Administration is governed by the Mayor. The lowest administrative unit is woreda where the woreda administrator is a representative of the executive power, elected by council.

== In literature ==
Dire Dawa was the inspiration for the fictional town "Debra Dowa", capital of the fictional East African nation "Azania" in the "outrageously un-politically correct tale" Black Mischief by the English author, Evelyn Waugh.

== Chairmen of the Administrative Council ==
- Abebe Eshete: 1981 – 1991
- Habtamu Assefa Wakjira: 1991 – 1993
- Ismail Aw Aden: 1993 – 1995
- Solomon Hailu: 1995 – 2003
- Fisseha Zerihun: 2003 – 2006
- Abdulaziz Mohammed: 7 August 2006 – 2008
- Adem Farah: June 2008 – 2010
- Asad Ziad: June 2010 – 2015
- Ibrahim Uthman: June 2015 – 2021
- Kedir Juhar: 29 September 2021 –present

== Notable people ==
- Ali Birra
- Ato Hussein Ismail
- Luciano Violante
- Ismail Omar Guelleh
- Abdul Majid Hussein
- Samia Zekaria

== See also ==
- Railway stations in Ethiopia
- Cement in Africa
