= Dire Dawa City Administration =

Municipal government of Dire Dawa in Ethiopia

Dire Dawa City Administration የድሬዳዋ ከተማ አስተዳደር
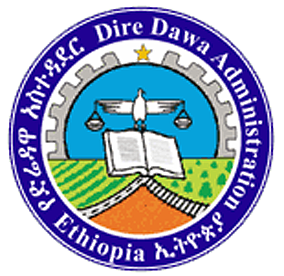
- Formation: 2004
- State: Chartered city
- Country: Ethiopia
- Website: direbofed.gov.et

Legislative branch
- Mayor: Kedir Juhar

The Dire Dawa City Administration (Amharic: የድሬዳዋ ከተማ አስተዳደር) is a municipal government of Dire Dawa city, an autonomous city in eastern Ethiopia. It is typically administered by a mayor whereas the lowest administrative unit is woreda. The woreda administrator is the highest representative of the executive power on one hand and on the other, by an elected council.

The administration was formed as current federal structure with Proclamation No. 416/2004 in 2004.

== Administration ==
=== Local authorities/administration ===
The Dire Dawa City Administration is governed by a mayor. Like Addis Ababa, Dire Dawa's lowest administrative level is woreda, which is run by woreda administrator. The administrator is representative of the executive power on one hand and on the other, by an elected council.

=== Civil status and documentation ===
The Civil Status Documentation is managed by the desk for vital events (birth, marriage, death) registration in the woreda of residence. A birth certification and registration takes place here. When identity card concerned, the same desk provides residence identity cards. The two documents are necessary steps to obtain national passport issued by the Immigration Nationality and Vital Events Agency in Dire Dawa branch. The passport costs 600 ETB, while the identity card costs approximately 50 ETB.

=== Judicial system ===
In Dire Dawa, the judicial system composed of First Instance Court, Highest Court and Supreme Court. Sharia law also used to impose arbitrary despite imposing Sharia retained to personal and civil cases.

=== Law enforcement ===
Dire Dawa's law enforcement the primarily task of the Eastern Command Post of the Ethiopian National Defense Force. Residents can report to local police which is the first respondent to resolve security issues.
