= Dire Dawa Train Station =

Historic railway station connecting Addis Ababa and Dire Dawa in Ethiopia

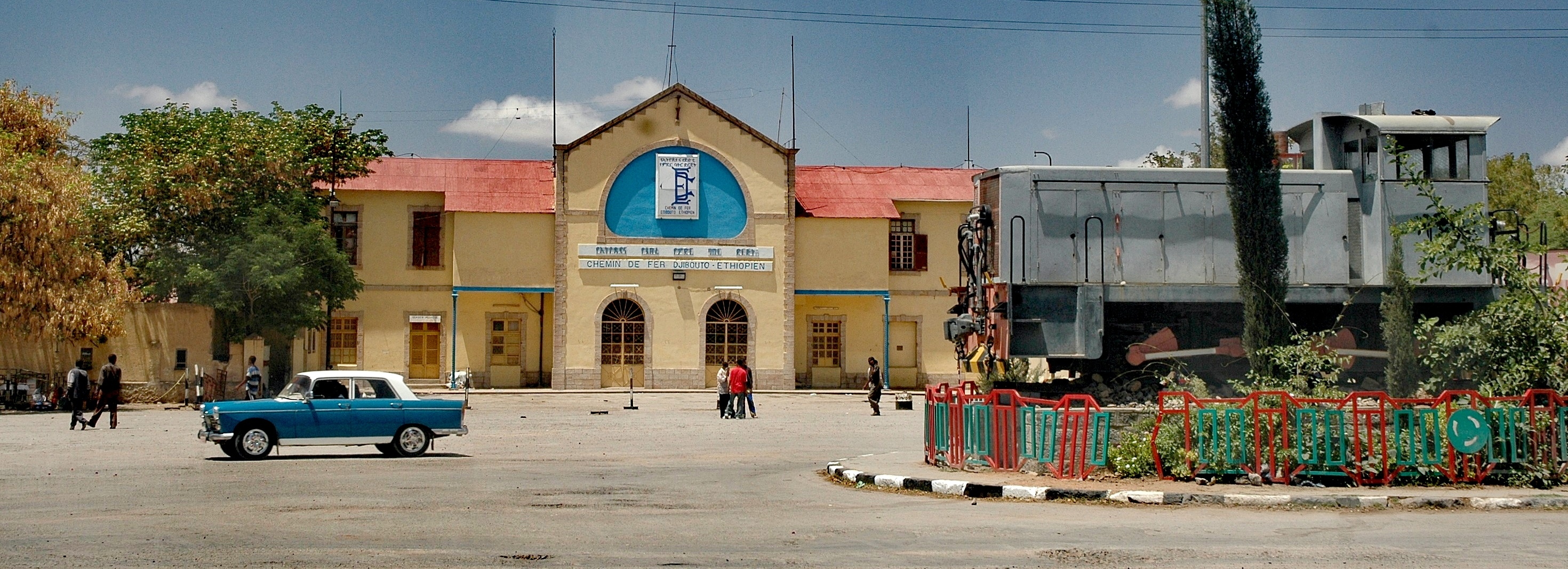

General information
- Location: Dire Dawa; Ethiopia
- Coordinates: 9.629°N 41.772°E
- System: Railway station
- Owner: Ethio-Djibouti Railway Standard Gauges Share Company
- Operator: Ethio-Djibouti Railway Standard Gauges Share Company

History
- Opened: 1897
- Closed: 1970s
Location

The Dire Dawa Train Station was a historic railway station connecting Addis Ababa and the city of Dire Dawa in Ethiopia. It was built by the French in 1897 as part of Ethio-Djibouti Railways.

Since the 1970s, the railway began to fall into disrepair and it was fully abandoned in the early 2000s.

== History ==
The Dire Dawa Train Station was built between 1897 by the order of Emperor Menelik II as complement of Ethio-Djibouti Railways. The line was reached after the founding of Dire Dawa in 1902 and Addis Ababa in 1917. By 1910, the station was completed. However, the railroad unable to reach in Harar due to elevation which makes Dire Dawa suitable for construction. In 1970s, the railway began to decline due to the raise of road transport and greater access to the sea via Eritrea, eventually the line between Addis Ababa-Dire Dawa was fully abandoned in early 2000s.
