= Ethiopian Teachers' Association =

Trade union in Ethiopia

ETA
- Ethiopian Teachers' Association
- የኢትዮጵያ መምህራን ማህበር
- Founded: 1949
- Headquarters: Addis Ababa, Ethiopia
- Location: Ethiopia
- Members: 450,000
- Key people: Yohannes Benti Chekorso (President); Yohnnes Benti, Shimelis Abebe, Tilahun Tarekegn, Destaye Tadesse, Tarekegn Haile are members of ETA executive committee
- Affiliations: EI
- Website: www.ethiopianteachersassociation.org

The Ethiopian Teachers' Association (ETA; Amharic: የኢትዮጵያ መምህራን ማህበር, romanized: ye’ītiyop’iya memihirani mahiberi) is a trade union in Ethiopia. It is affiliated with Education International.

== Background ==
The ETA formed in February 1949 by 32 teachers from Minilik Senior Secondary School, located in Addis Abba, the capital of Ethiopia. The ETA was initially named Teachers' Union but in 1965 the association quickly began to be known nationwide and as a result became known as Ethiopian Teachers’ Association (ETA). The ETA has support from UNESCO, UNICEF, Education International, International Organization for Development of Freedom of Education (Switzerland), World Teachers’ Organization (Belgium), ILO, United Nation Human Rights Commission, African Education Association for Development, and Teachers’ Associations of Sweden, Switzerland, Germany and the UK. “The Ethiopian Teachers’ Association unifies all teachers and education personnel in Ethiopia."

== History ==
The ICFTU reports ongoing difficulties and harassment of trade union members by government security forces, and specifically notes the ETA. Dr. Taye Woldesemayat, president of the ETA, was sentenced to 15 years' imprisonment in 1996, but was released from prison in May 2002 after 6 years. In 2005, security forces occupied the ETA headquarters in Addis Ababa for two weeks, taking vital documents and equipment, and detained six members. Since then, ETA members have been under persistent attack, with more than 20 teachers dismissed for allegedly supporting opposition political parties.

Another act of government harassment started in 1993, when the Ethiopian government created a splinter group with close ties to itself, known as the "New ETA", and began to redirect the ETA’s union dues to it. The original group fought this act in court, twice succeeding in getting the High Court to overturn the government's act in 2006, although these judgments were never enforced. However in a ruling announced 21 June 2007, the Federal High Court ruled against the original ETA, and ordered the ETA to hand over property, other assets, and its name; the Federal Supreme Court of Ethiopia denied an appeal 7 February 2008, effectively ending the legal struggle.

However, harassment of current and former members by the government reportedly continues. Tilahun Ayalew, chairman of the Dangila chapter of the ETA and coordinator of the program "Education for All", was detained by police from December 2007 to March 2008. He reported that he was imprisoned and tortured at Bahir Dar for three to four days before being transferred to a police station in Addis Ababa, where police again tortured him. The Federal First Instance Court then released him on a habeas corpus petition, citing the lack of formal charges. However, shortly after seeing his family upon release, Tilahun disappeared and his whereabouts remained unknown at the end of 2008. Another victim was Anteneh Getnet, chairman of the original ETA in Addis Ababa and an ETA coordinator, who was arrested in 2006 on charges of being a member of the Ethiopian Patriotic Front an outlawed, allegedly armed group operating in the Amhara Region. The Federal High Court denied his release, but the Federal Supreme Court released him on bail. After a few additional trial appearances, he disappeared in March, and his whereabouts remained unknown at year's end. Anteneh was first detained in 2006 for over two months on charges of instigating violence in the 2005 elections, and alleged that he was tortured during that incarceration.
