= Mayor of Dire Dawa =

Head of an executive branch in Ethiopia

Mayor of Dire Dawa, Somali
- የድሬዳዋ ከንቲባ
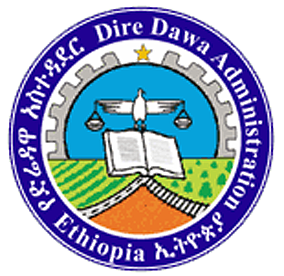
- Incumbent; Kadir Juhar since 29 September 2021
- Style: His/Her Honor
- Inaugural holder: Abebe Eshete
- Formation: 1981

The Mayor of Dire Dawa (Amharic: የድሬዳዋ ከንቲባ) is head of the executive branch of Dire Dawa's municipal government. Kedir Juhar currently serves as the mayor of Dire Dawa since 29 September 2021. The Dire Dawa mayorship was inaugurated in 1981 with the position that has five years office terms.

The mayor has official title called "Chairman" and "Chief Administrator"

== List of mayors ==
- Abebe Eshete: 1981 – 1991
- Habtamu Assefa Wakjira: 1991 – 1993
- Ismail Aw Aden: 1993 – 1995
- Solomon Hailu: 1995 – 2003
- Fisseha Zerihun: 2003 – 2006
- Abdulaziz Mohammed: 7 August 2006 - 2008
- Adem Farah: June 2008 – 2010
- Asad Ziad: June 2010 – 2015
- Ibrahim Osman: June 2015 – 2021
- Kedir Juhar: 29 September 2021 –present
