= Graziani =

Graziani is an Italian surname. Notable people with the surname include:

- Achille Graziani (1839–1918), Italian archaeologist
- Ariel Graziani (born 1971), South American footballer
- Augusto Graziani (1933–2014), Italian economist
- Domenico Graziani (1944–2026), Italian Roman Catholic archbishop
- Ercole Graziani the Younger (1688–1765), Italian painter
- Francesco Graziani (1828–1901), Italian baritone
- Francesco Graziani (born 1952), Italian footballer
- Gaspar Graziani (died 1620), Voivode (Prince) of Moldavia
- Girolamo Graziani (1604–1675), Italian poet
- Giulio Cesare Graziani (1915–1998), Italian aviator
- Ivan Graziani (1945–1997), Italian singer-songwriter
- Izhak Graziani (1924–2003), Bulgarian-born Israeli conductor
- Lodovico Graziani (1820–1885), Italian operatic tenor
- Luis Arias Graziani (1926–2020), Peruvian air force officer and politician
- Rodolfo Graziani (1882–1955), high-ranking Italian military officer and political figure during the 1930s and 1940s
- Sergio Graziani (1930-2018), Italian actor and voice actor
- Tony Graziani (born 1973), American football player
